= List of municipalities of the province of Lodi =

The following is a list of the 60 municipalities (comuni) of the Province of Lodi in the region of Lombardy in Italy.

== List ==
Municipality	Population (2026)	Area (km^{2})	Density
Abbadia Cerreto	280	6.20	45.2
Bertonico	1,081	20.83	51.9
Boffalora d'Adda	1,737	8.13	213.7
Borghetto Lodigiano	4,430	23.64	187.4
Borgo San Giovanni	2,444	7.50	325.9
Brembio	2,807	17.08	164.3
Casaletto Lodigiano	3,019	9.75	309.6
Casalmaiocco	3,218	4.71	683.2
Casalpusterlengo	16,069	25.61	627.5
Caselle Landi	1,431	26.01	55.0
Caselle Lurani	3,071	7.68	399.9
Castelgerundo	1,454	19.87	73.2
Castelnuovo Bocca d'Adda	1,544	20.33	75.9
Castiglione d'Adda	4,524	12.98	348.5
Castiraga Vidardo	3,048	5.04	604.8
Cavenago d'Adda	2,128	16.10	132.2
Cervignano d'Adda	2,247	4.07	552.1
Codogno	15,652	20.87	750.0
Comazzo	2,379	12.80	185.9
Cornegliano Laudense	2,861	5.70	501.9
Corno Giovine	1,144	9.94	115.1
Cornovecchio	199	6.53	30.5
Corte Palasio	1,522	15.68	97.1
Crespiatica	2,208	7.03	314.1
Fombio	2,266	7.40	306.2
Galgagnano	1,308	6.01	217.6
Graffignana	2,602	10.92	238.3
Guardamiglio	2,730	10.44	261.5
Livraga	2,534	12.37	204.9
Lodi	45,643	41.38	1,103.0
Lodi Vecchio	7,717	16.45	469.1
Maccastorna	67	5.75	11.7
Mairago	1,375	11.25	122.2
Maleo	3,055	19.83	154.1
Marudo	1,757	4.20	418.3
Massalengo	4,456	8.48	525.5
Meleti	456	7.39	61.7
Merlino	1,655	10.73	154.2
Montanaso Lombardo	2,256	9.52	237.0
Mulazzano	5,829	15.58	374.1
Orio Litta	2,076	9.78	212.3
Ospedaletto Lodigiano	2,008	8.50	236.2
Ossago Lodigiano	1,422	11.53	123.3
Pieve Fissiraga	1,753	12.27	142.9
Salerano sul Lambro	2,690	4.38	614.2
San Fiorano	1,893	8.97	211.0
San Martino in Strada	3,776	13.15	287.1
San Rocco al Porto	3,452	30.57	112.9
Sant'Angelo Lodigiano	13,577	20.05	677.2
Santo Stefano Lodigiano	1,852	10.53	175.9
Secugnago	2,001	6.75	296.4
Senna Lodigiana	1,813	27.02	67.1
Somaglia	3,864	20.82	185.6
Sordio	3,444	2.82	1,221.3
Tavazzano con Villavesco	6,098	16.07	379.5
Terranova dei Passerini	952	11.26	84.5
Turano Lodigiano	1,576	16.38	96.2
Valera Fratta	1,698	8.01	212.0
Villanova del Sillaro	1,899	13.50	140.7
Zelo Buon Persico	7,434	18.88	393.8

== See also ==
- List of municipalities of Lombardy
- List of municipalities of Italy
