= Fornoni =

Fornoni is an Italian surname. Notable people with the surname include:

- Giacomo Fornoni (1939–2016), Italian cyclist
- Massimo Fornoni (born 1989), Italian footballer

== See also ==
- Foroni
