= Lino Osvaldo Felissari =

Italian politician (born 1951)

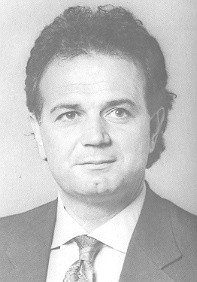

President of the Province of Lodi
- In office 27 June 2004 – 8 June 2009
- Preceded by: Lorenzo Guerini
- Succeeded by: Pietro Foroni

Member of the Chamber of Deputies
- In office 2 July 1987 – 14 April 1994

Mayor of Lodi Vecchio
- Incumbent
- Assumed office 26 May 2019
- Preceded by: Alberto Vitale
- In office 24 April 1995 – 14 June 2004
- Preceded by: Francesco Zoppetti
- Succeeded by: Giovanni Carlo Cordoni
- In office 24 September 1975 – 18 September 1985
- Preceded by: Vittorio Fregoni
- Succeeded by: Francesco Zoppetti

Personal details
- Born: 14 February 1951 (age 75) Peschiera Borromeo, Province of Milan, Italy
- Party: PCI (until 1991); PDS (1991–1998); DS (1998–2007); PD (since 2007)
- Occupation: Employee

Lino Osvaldo Felissari (born 14 February 1951) is an Italian politician of the Democratic Party. He has served multiple terms as mayor of Lodi Vecchio, and was president of the Province of Lodi from 2004 to 2009. He was also a member of the Chamber of Deputies from 1987 to 1994. He was elected to the Chamber of Deputies in the 1987 general election for the Italian Communist Party, and was re-elected in 1992 as a member of the Democratic Party of the Left.
