= Scuola "Enrico Mattei" =

Italian international school

Coordinates: 33.5909°N 7.6303°W

- École italienne Enrico Mattei مدرسة إنريكو ماتي

Information
- Established: 1920

Scuola "Enrico Mattei" (French: École italienne Enrico Mattei, Arabic: مدرسة إنريكو ماتي) is a private Italian international school in Morocco which is headquartered in Casablanca. The main campus in Casablanca includes preschool, primary school, lower secondary school, and upper secondary school. There is also a branch school in Tangier. The school takes its name from Enrico Mattei, an Italian public administrator.

== History ==
The school opened in 1920. In 1995, the Casablanca campus had 50 students. By 2010 the student count grew to 340, with 85% of the students being Moroccans. A branch campus in Tangier was scheduled to open in September of that year.
