= Borgo San Giovanni =

- Comune
- Comune di Borgo San Giovanni
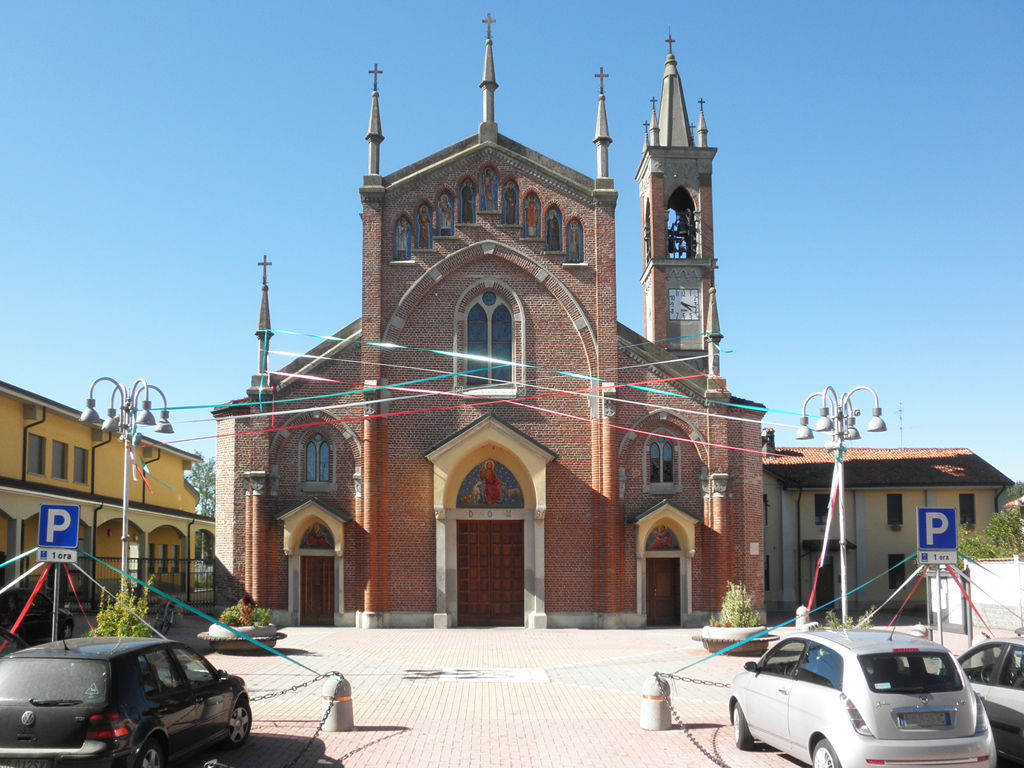
- The parish church, Borgo San Giovanni

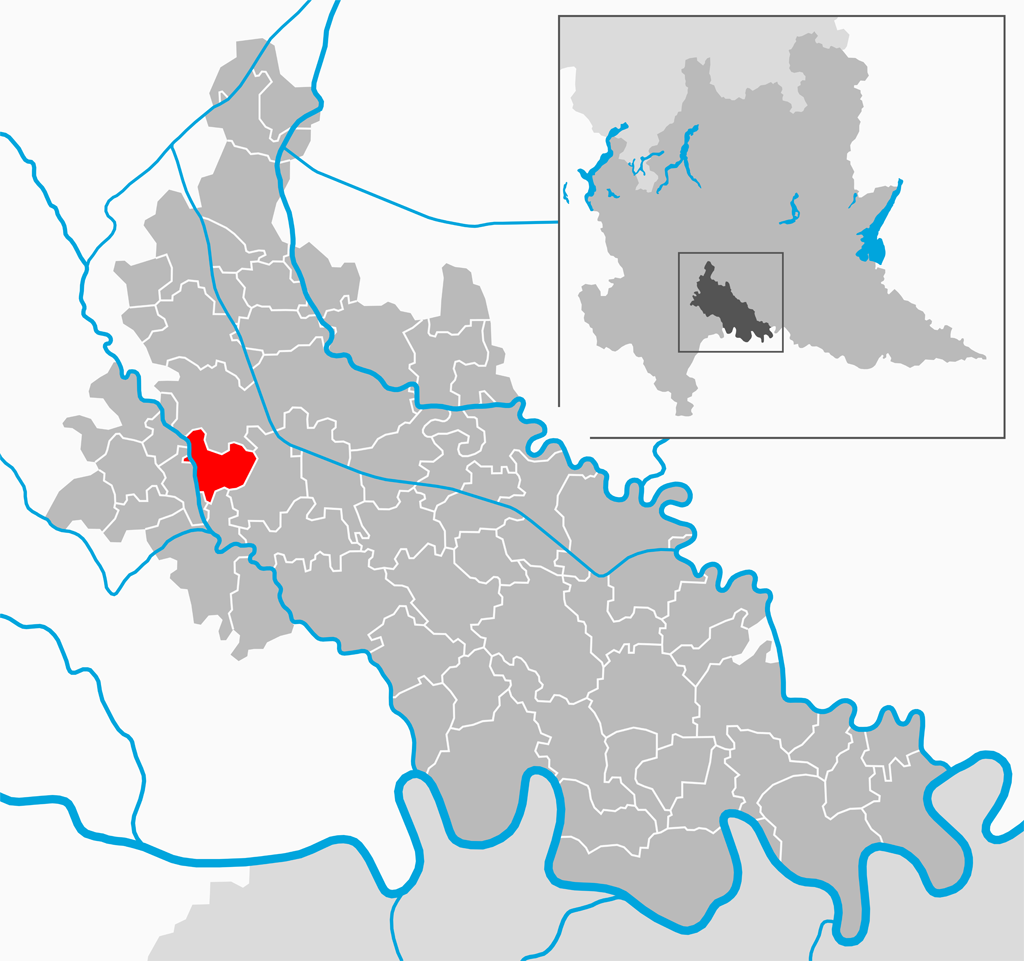

- Location within Italy Location within Lombardy
- Coordinates: 45°16′N 9°26′E
- Country: Italy
- Region: Lombardy
- Province: Lodi (LO)
- Frazioni: Cà dell'Acqua, Guazzina

Government
  - Mayor: Nicola Buonsante

Area
  - Total: 7.7 km^{2} (3.0 sq mi)
- Elevation: 77 m (253 ft)

Population (30 April 2017)
  - Total: 2,401
  - Density: 310/km^{2} (810/sq mi)
- Demonym: Cazzimini
- Time zone: UTC+1 (CET)
  - Summer (DST): UTC+2 (CEST)
- Postal code: 26851
- Dialing code: 0371
- Website: Official website

Borgo San Giovanni is a comune (municipality) in the Province of Lodi in the Italian region of Lombardy, located about 30 kilometres (19 mi) southeast of Milan and about 8 kilometres (5 mi) southwest of Lodi.

Borgo San Giovanni borders the following municipalities: Lodi Vecchio, Salerano sul Lambro, Pieve Fissiraga, Castiraga Vidardo, and Sant'Angelo Lodigiano.
