= Cavacurta =

- Frazione
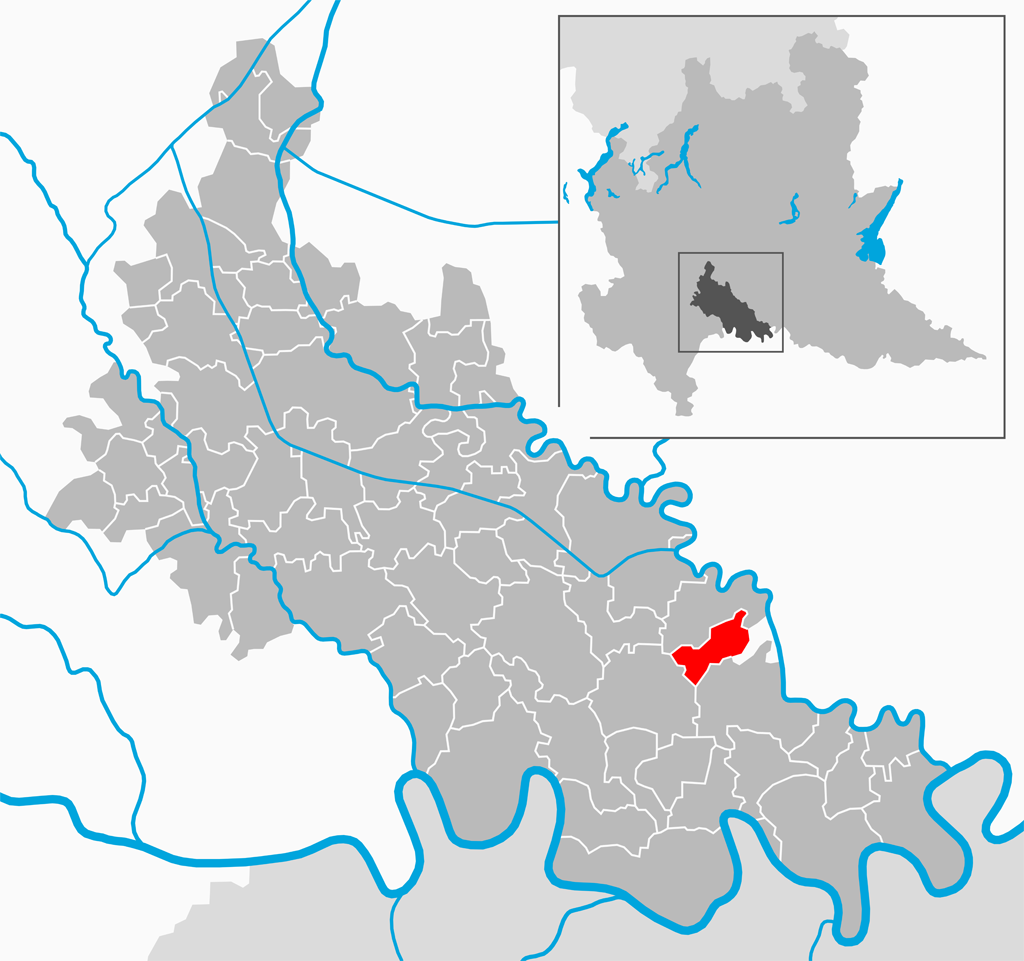

- Location of Cavacurta in Italy
- Coordinates: 45°12′N 9°43′E
- Country: Italy
- Region: Lombardy
- Province: Lodi (LO)
- Comune: Castelgerundo

Area
  - Total: 7.1 km^{2} (2.7 sq mi)
- Elevation: 60 m (200 ft)

Population (30 June 2017)
  - Total: 848
  - Density: 120/km^{2} (310/sq mi)
- Time zone: UTC+1 (CET)
  - Summer (DST): UTC+2 (CEST)
- Postal code: 26844
- Dialing code: 0377

Cavacurta is a frazione of Castelgerundo in the Province of Lodi in the Italian region Lombardy, located about 50 kilometres (31 mi) southeast of Milan and about 20 kilometres (12 mi) southeast of Lodi.

From 1 January 2018 the comune was unified with Camairago and the new municipality took the name of Castelgerundo.
