= Mauro Soldati =

Italian politician (born 1976)

President of the Province of Lodi
- In office 30 September 2014 – 5 October 2017
- Preceded by: Pietro Foroni
- Succeeded by: Francesco Passerini

Personal details
- Born: 12 March 1976 (age 50) Pavia, Lombardy, Italy
- Party: Democratic Party

Mauro Soldati (born 12 March 1976) is an Italian politician of the Democratic Party who served as president of the Province of Lodi from 2014 to 2017.

== Political career ==
Soldati served as provincial assessor for education, youth, sport and tourism from 2004 to 2009. He subsequently became provincial secretary of the Democratic Party.

In the 2014 provincial election, the first following the Delrio Law, Soldati was the candidate of the centre-left coalition supported by the Democratic Party and Left Ecology Freedom. He defeated Mauro Salvalaglio, the centre-right candidate supported by Forza Italia, New Centre-Right and Lega Nord, with 52,936 weighted votes (59.73%).

Soldati resigned as president in October 2017 in order to stand as a candidate in the 2018 Italian general election. He was succeeded on an interim basis by vice-president Giuseppe Russo. He subsequently stood for election to the Chamber of Deputies but was not elected.
