= Camairago =

- Frazione
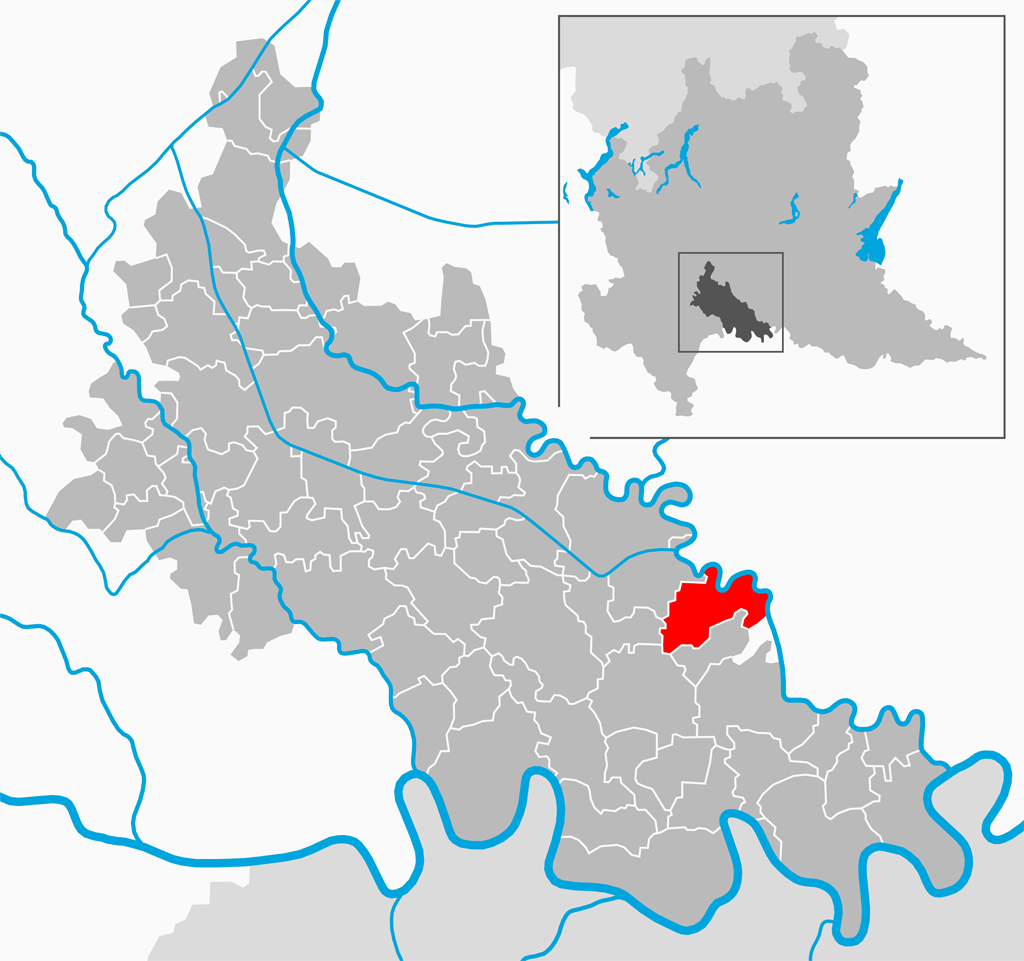

- Location of Camairago in Italy
- Coordinates: 45°12′N 9°43′E
- Country: Italy
- Region: Lombardy
- Province: Province of Lodi (LO)
- Comune: Castelgerundo

Area
  - Total: 12.9 km^{2} (5.0 sq mi)
- Elevation: 53 m (174 ft)

Population (30 April 2017)
  - Total: 656
  - Density: 50.9/km^{2} (132/sq mi)
- Demonym: Camairaghesi
- Time zone: UTC+1 (CET)
  - Summer (DST): UTC+2 (CEST)
- Postal code: 26823
- Dialing code: 0377

Camairago is a frazione of Castelgerundo in the Province of Lodi in the Italian region Lombardy, located about 50 kilometres (31 mi) southeast of Milan and about 20 kilometres (12 mi) southeast of Lodi.

From 1 January 2018 the comune was unified with Cavacurta and the new municipality took the name of Castelgerundo.
