= Francesco Passerini =

Italian politician (born 1984)

President of the Province of Lodi
- In office 6 February 2018 – 27 March 2022
- Preceded by: Mauro Soldati
- Succeeded by: Fabrizio Santantonio

Mayor of Codogno
- Incumbent
- Assumed office 7 June 2016
- Preceded by: Vincenzo Ceretti

Personal details
- Born: 14 June 1984 (age 42) Codogno, Lombardy, Italy
- Party: Lega

Francesco Passerini (born 14 June 1984) is an Italian politician who has served as mayor of Codogno since 2016. He was president of the Province of Lodi from 2018 to 2022.

== Political career ==
Passerini was elected mayor of Codogno in the 2016 municipal elections, as the candidate of Lega Nord, Forza Italia and two civic lists, receiving 52.73% of the vote.

In February 2018, Passerini was elected president of the Province of Lodi as a candidate of the Lega, supported by a centre-right coalition including Forza Italia and Brothers of Italy. In October 2018, the centre-right list supporting Passerini won eight of the ten seats in the provincial council.

Passerini sought re-election as president in 2022, but received the 46% of the vote and was defeated by Fabrizio Santantonio of the centre-left coalition.
