= San Zenone al Lambro =

- Comune
- Comune di San Zenone al Lambro
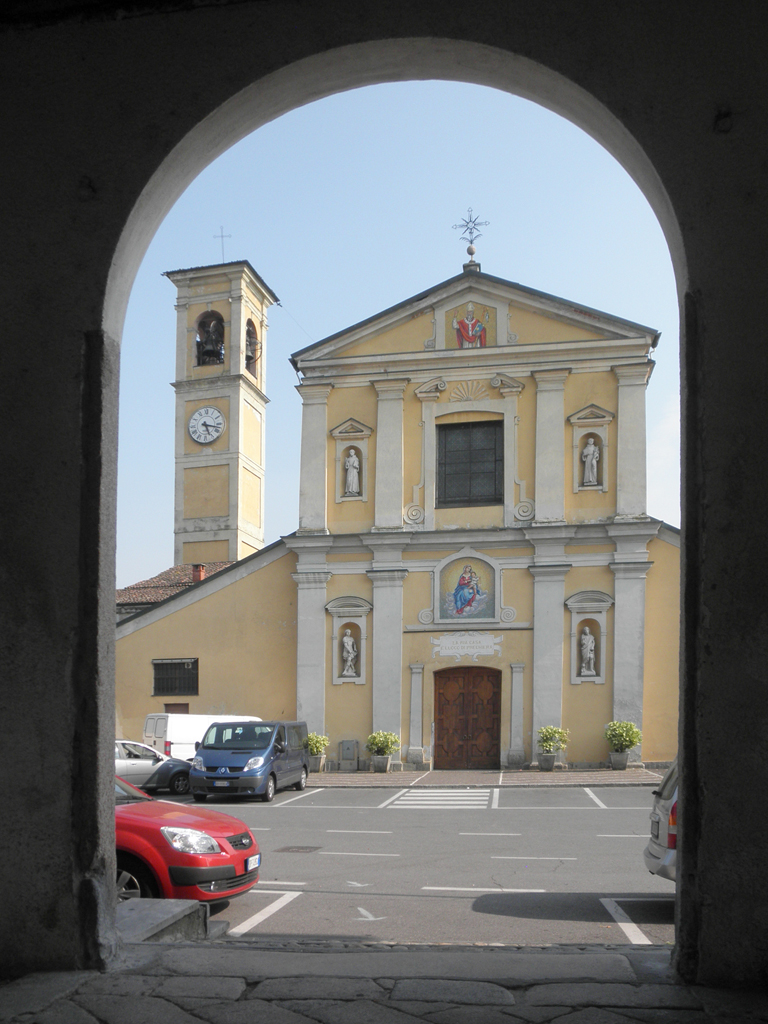

- Coat of arms

- Location within Italy Location within Lombardy
- Coordinates: 45°19′N 9°21′E
- Country: Italy
- Region: Lombardy
- Metropolitan city: Milan (MI)

Government
  - Mayor: Arianna Tronconi

Area
  - Total: 7.24 km^{2} (2.80 sq mi)
- Elevation: 83 m (272 ft)

Population (31 August 2016)
  - Total: 4,498
  - Density: 621/km^{2} (1,610/sq mi)
- Demonym: Sanzenonesi
- Time zone: UTC+1 (CET)
  - Summer (DST): UTC+2 (CEST)
- Postal code: 20070
- Dialing code: 02
- Website: Official website

San Zenone al Lambro (Milanese: San Zenon [ˌsãː dzeˈnũː], locally San Zanon [ˌsãː dzaˈnũː]) is a comune (municipality) in the Metropolitan City of Milan in the Italian region Lombardy, located about 20 kilometres (12 mi) southeast of Milan.

San Zenone al Lambro borders the following municipalities: Vizzolo Predabissi, Tavazzano con Villavesco, Cerro al Lambro, Sordio, Lodi Vecchio, Casaletto Lodigiano and Salerano sul Lambro. It is served by San Zenone al Lambro railway station.
