= Mario Beccaria =

Italian politician (1920–2003)

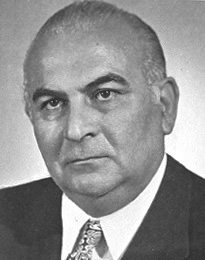

Mayor of Sant'Angelo Lodigiano
- In office 1960–1964
- Preceded by: Gino Pasetti
- Succeeded by: Giancarlo Manzoni

Italian Chamber of Deputies
- In office 5 June 1968 – 24 May 1972

Italian Chamber of Deputies
- In office 25 May 1972 – 4 July 1976

Personal details
- Born: 18 June 1920 Sant'Angelo Lodigiano, Italy
- Died: 22 November 2003 (aged 83)
- Party: DC
- Profession: Politician

Mario Beccaria (18 June 1920 – 22 November 2003) was an Italian politician of the Christian Democracy. He served as the mayor of Sant'Angelo Lodigiano from 1960 to 1964 and was a member of the Italian Chamber of Deputies.

He was a lover of music: in the 50s he was part of the Association Amundis, who helped lodigian singers and musicians.

In Sant'Angelo Lodigiano it has been dedicated a street to him.
