= Marudo =

Marudo Marüd (Lombard)
- Comune
- Comune di Marudo
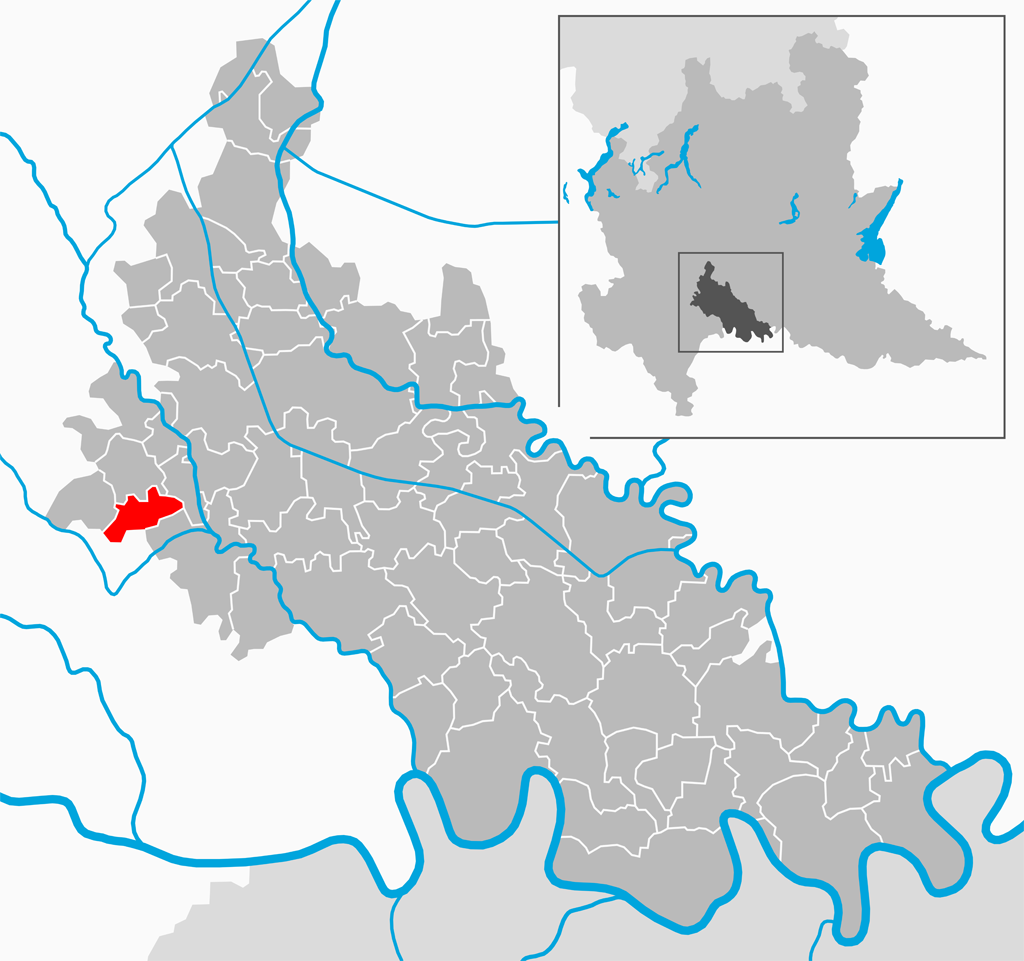

- Location within Italy Location within Lombardy
- Coordinates: 45°19′N 9°20′E
- Country: Italy
- Region: Lombardy
- Province: Lodi (LO)

Government
  - Mayor: Claudio Bariselli

Area
  - Total: 4.2 km^{2} (1.6 sq mi)
- Elevation: 77 m (253 ft)

Population (31 December 2016)
  - Total: 1,707
  - Density: 410/km^{2} (1,100/sq mi)
- Demonym: Marudesi
- Time zone: UTC+1 (CET)
  - Summer (DST): UTC+2 (CEST)
- Postal code: 26866
- Dialing code: 0371
- Website: Official website

Marudo (Lodigiano: Marüd) is a comune (municipality) in the Province of Lodi in the Italian region Lombardy, located about 20 kilometres (12 mi) southeast of Milan and about 13 kilometres (8 mi) west of Lodi.

Marudo borders the following municipalities: Caselle Lurani, Castiraga Vidardo, Valera Fratta, Sant'Angelo Lodigiano, Villanterio.
