= Tavazzano con Villavesco =

Tavazzano con Villavesco Tavasàn cun Vilavésch (Lombard)
- Comune
- Comune di Tavazzano con Villavesco
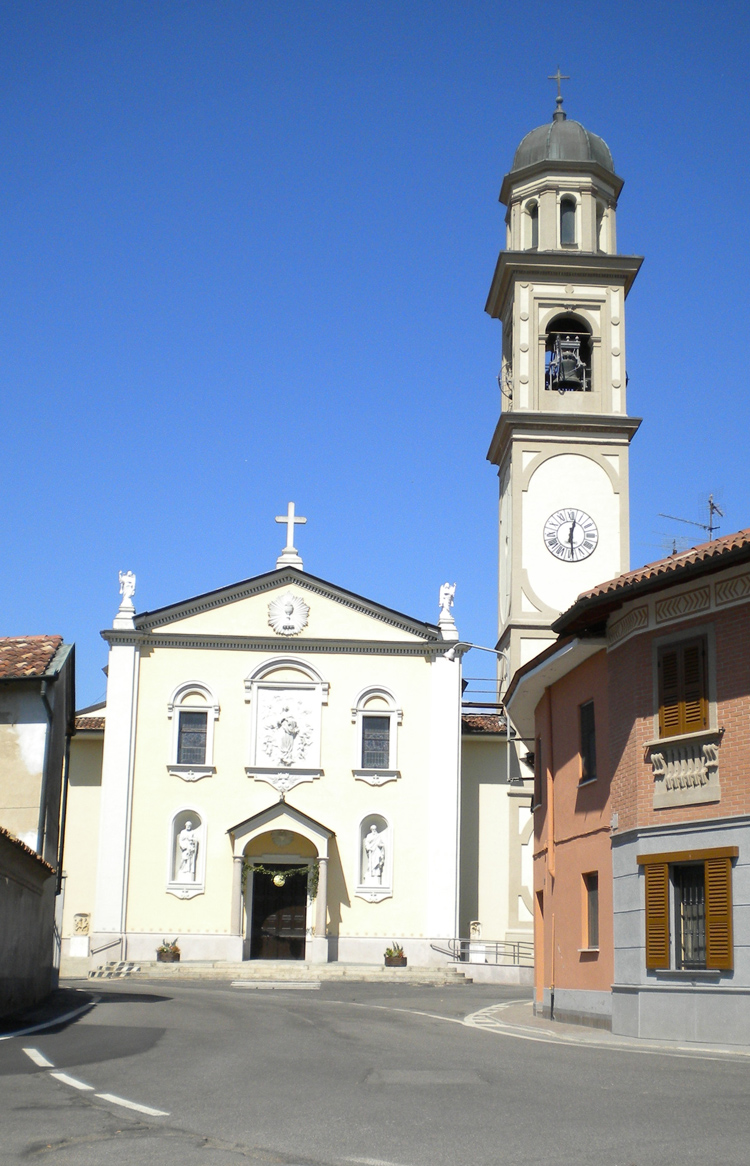
- Church

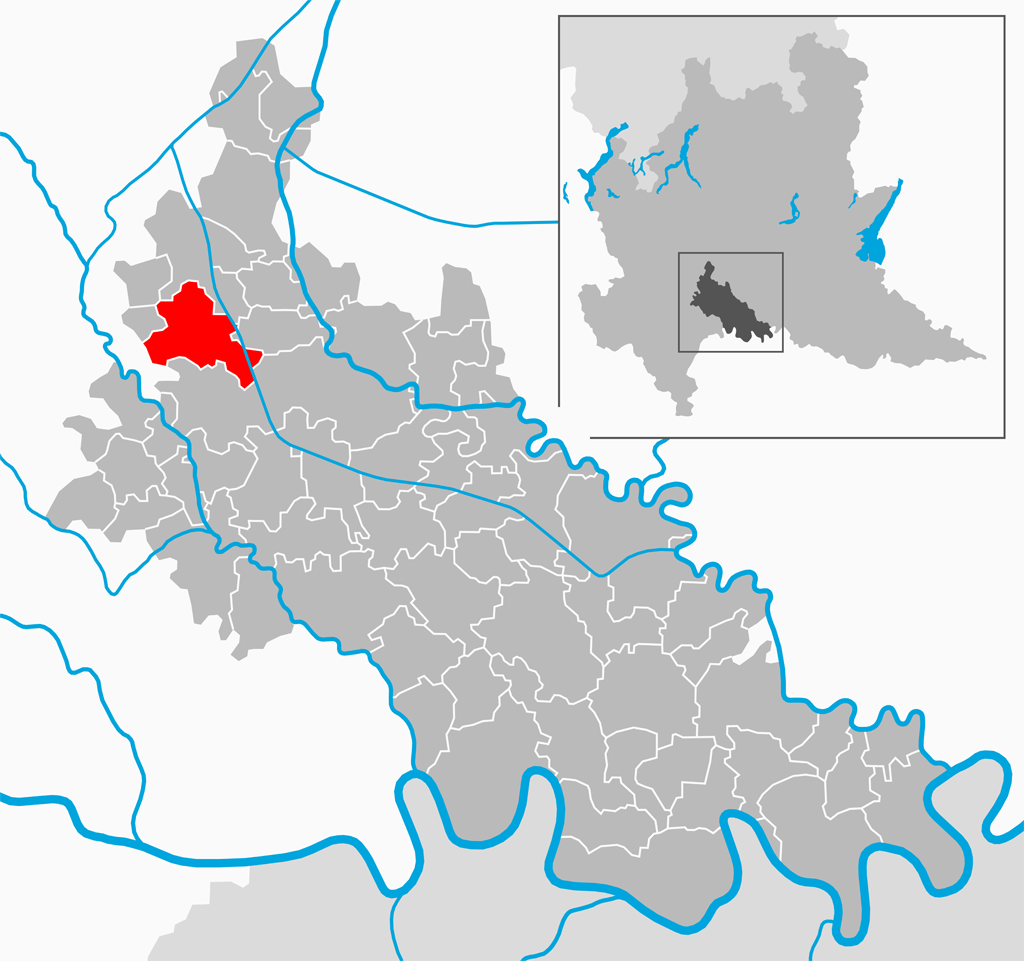

- Location within Italy Location within Lombardy
- Coordinates: 45°14′N 9°30′E
- Country: Italy
- Region: Lombardy
- Province: Lodi (LO)

Government
  - Mayor: Giuseppe Russo

Area
  - Total: 16.2 km^{2} (6.3 sq mi)
- Elevation: 82 m (269 ft)

Population (31 January 2015)
  - Total: 6,177
  - Density: 381/km^{2} (988/sq mi)
- Demonym: Tavazzanesi or Villaveschini
- Time zone: UTC+1 (CET)
  - Summer (DST): UTC+2 (CEST)
- Postal code: 26838
- Dialing code: 0371
- Website: Official website

Tavazzano con Villavesco (Lodigiano: Tavasàn cun Vilavésch) is a comune (municipality) in the Province of Lodi in the Italian region Lombardy, located about 35 kilometres (22 mi) southeast of Milan and about 9 kilometres (5.6 mi) northwest of Lodi.

Tavazzano con Villavesco borders the following municipalities: Mulazzano, Casalmaiocco, Lodi, Montanaso Lombardo, Sordio, San Zenone al Lambro and Lodi Vecchio. It is served by Tavazzano railway station.
