= Salerano sul Lambro =

- Comune
- Comune di Salerano sul Lambro
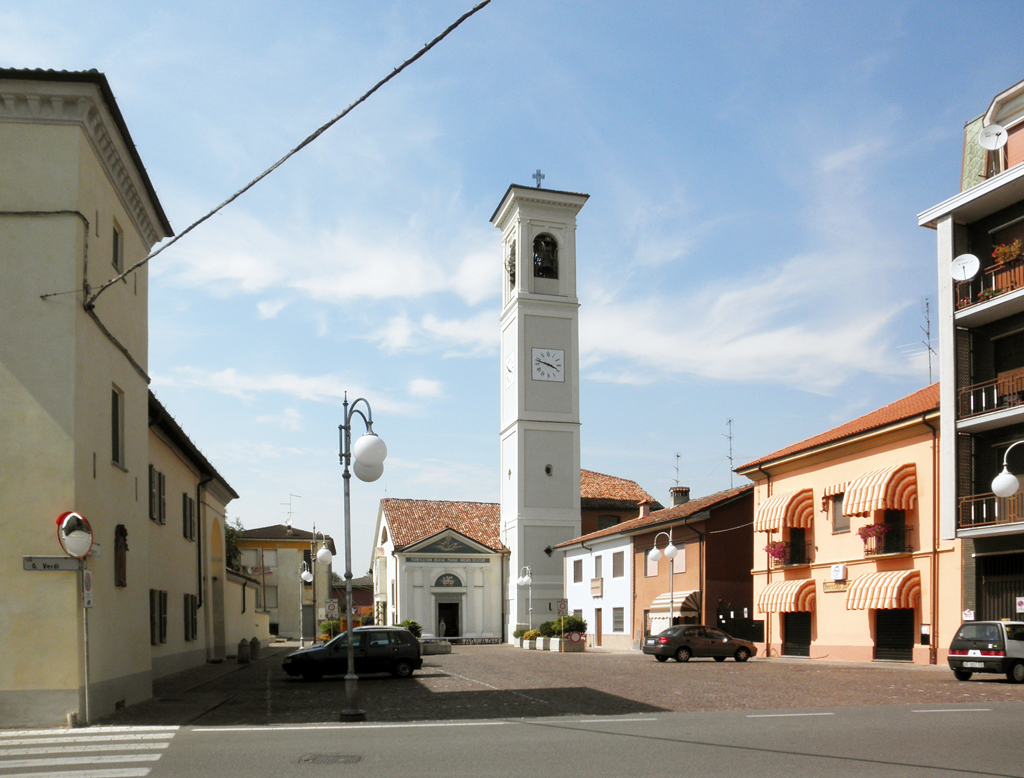

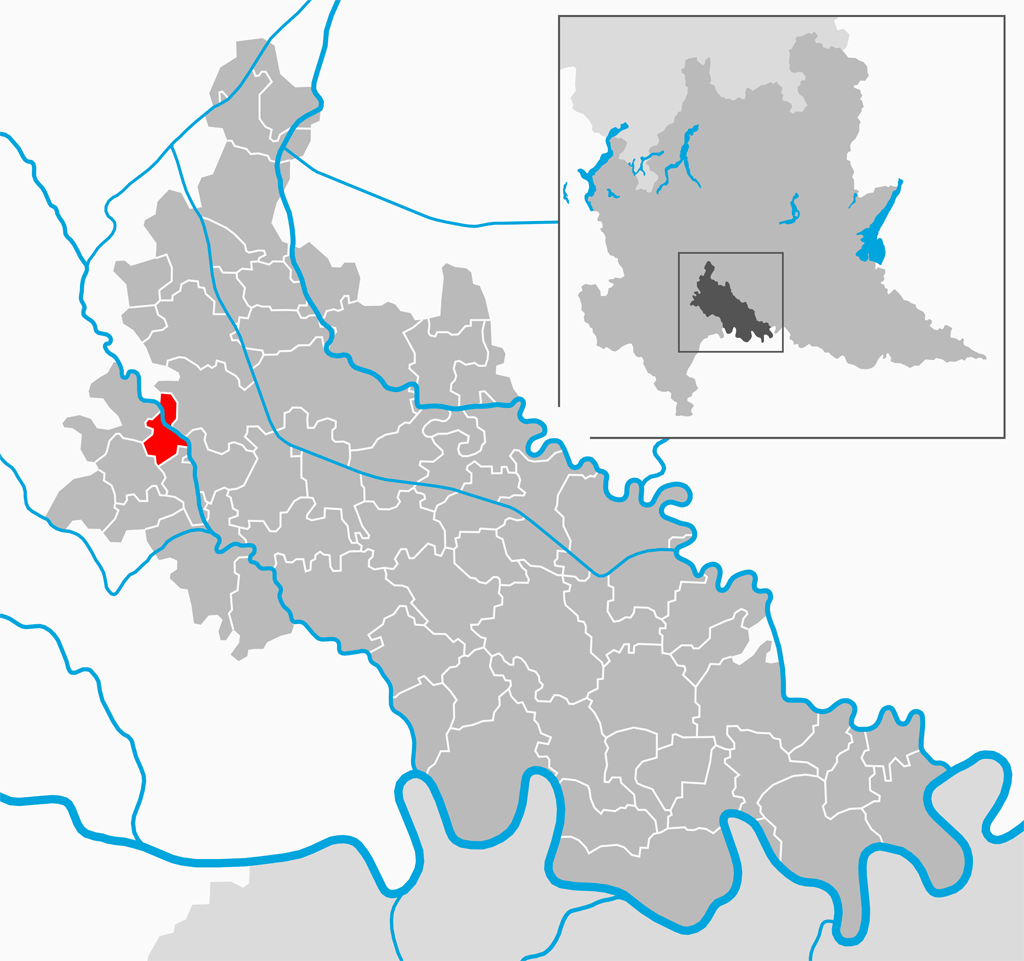

- Location within Italy Location within Lombardy
- Coordinates: 45°17′N 9°23′E
- Country: Italy
- Region: Lombardy
- Province: Lodi (LO)

Government
  - Mayor: Stefania Marcolin

Area
  - Total: 4.3 km^{2} (1.7 sq mi)
- Elevation: 77 m (253 ft)

Population (30 November 2012)
  - Total: 2,695
  - Density: 630/km^{2} (1,600/sq mi)
- Demonym: Saleranini
- Time zone: UTC+1 (CET)
  - Summer (DST): UTC+2 (CEST)
- Postal code: 26857
- Dialing code: 0371
- Website: Official website

Salerano sul Lambro (Lodigiano: Salaràn) is a comune (municipality) in the Province of Lodi in the Italian region Lombardy, located about 25 kilometres (16 mi) southeast of Milan and about 10 kilometres (6 mi) southwest of Lodi.

Salerano sul Lambro borders the following municipalities: San Zenone al Lambro, Lodi Vecchio, Casaletto Lodigiano, Borgo San Giovanni, Caselle Lurani, Castiraga Vidardo.
