= Irnerio Bertuzzi =

Italian military aviator

- Born: 9 October 1919; Rimini
- Died: 27 October 1962 (aged 43); Bascapè, province of Pavia
- Burial place: Rimini
- Military career
- Allegiance: Kingdom of Italy; Italian Social Republic
- Branch: Regia Aeronautica; Aeronautica Nazionale Repubblicana
- Service years: 1940–1945
- Rank: Tenente (First Lieutenant)
- Unit: 2ª squadriglia Torpedo Bombers
- Conflicts: World War II
- Awards: Silver Medal of Military Valor;Bronze Medal of Military Valor
- Other work: Alitalia pilot; Enrico Mattei's personal pilot

Irnerio Bertuzzi (9 October 1919 – 27 October 1962) was an Italian military aviator of World War II who also served as personal pilot to Enrico Mattei, head of the Italian petroleum company Eni. He died aged 43 when the aircraft he was flying was sabotaged to crash.

== Military career ==
During World War II he flew Savoia-Marchetti SM.79 aircraft in the Aerosiluranti (torpedo bomber) squadrons of Regia Aeronautica with the rank of Tenente. After 8 September 1943, he chose to fight for the Italian Social Republic as a member of the Gruppo Aerosiluranti Buscaglia-Faggioni. Commander of the 2nd Squadron of Aeronautica Nazionale Repubblicana, he led several torpedo bombing raids against the Allied fleet at Anzio and Gibraltar, often by night, since Bertuzzi was exceptionally skilled in instrument flight.

Bertuzzi was awarded two Silver Medals and one Bronze Medal of Military Valor during the war.

== Flying for Mattei ==
In the years following World War II, after a long period flying with Alitalia and a stint with Douglas DC-6s in South America, he was hired by Eni in 1958 to lead the company's aircraft fleet. The chairman, Enrico Mattei, trusted him implicitly despite being a decorated ex-partisan and Bertuzzi an ex-fascist.

Bertuzzi was at the controls of Mattei's Morane-Saulnier MS.760 Paris executive jet (I–SNAP) when it crashed in the countryside surrounding Bascapè in the province of Pavia, on 27 October 1962. Besides Bertuzzi and Mattei, American Time–Life journalist William McHale was also killed in the crash. Shortly before takeoff on the fateful flight, he had announced to Mattei his intention to quit his job to take the lead in a new society called Alis.

Four months after the crash, the first enquiry was dismissed, attributing the liability of the disaster to the pilot's physical and psychological status and to technical malfunctions. In 2003, however, the inquiry of the Pavia Deputy Public Prosecutor Vincenzo Calia ascertained that the crash was caused by the explosion of ca. 100 gr. of Composition B planted behind the instrument panel and directly on the landing gear lowering mechanism.

At the time of his death, Bertuzzi had logged 11,236 flying hours, of which 625 were on the MS.760 aircraft.

== Honours and awards ==
Silver Medal of Military Valor (twice)
Bronze Medal of Military Valor

== Bibliography ==
- Martino Aichner, Giorgio Evangelisti, Storia degli Aerosiluranti italiani e del Gruppo Buscaglia, Longanesi, 1969.
