= Fabrizio Santantonio =

Italian politician (born 1965)

President of the Province of Lodi
- Incumbent
- Assumed office 27 March 2022
- Preceded by: Francesco Passerini

Mayor of Maccastorna
- Incumbent
- Assumed office 26 May 2014
- Preceded by: Piero Giovanetti

Member of the Regional Council of Lombardy
- In office 23 April 2010 – 17 March 2013

Personal details
- Born: 16 July 1965 (age 61) Lodi, Province of Milan, Italy
- Education: Catholic University of the Sacred Heart

Fabrizio Santantonio (born 16 July 1965) is an Italian politician serving as president of the Province of Lodi since 2022. He has served as mayor of Maccastorna since 2014.

In the early 1990s, Santantonio served as a councillor in Massalengo and Lodi for Christian Democracy. From 1999 to 2009, he served as assessor for agriculture of the Province of Lodi. In the 2010 Lombard regional election, he was elected to the Regional Council of Lombardy for the Democratic Party.

In the 2022 provincial election, Santantonio, supported by the centre-left coalition and the civic lists, was elected president of the Province of Lodi, defeating incumbent Francesco Passerini, the centre-right candidate. Santantonio received 46,148 weighted votes (54%), compared with 39,297 (46%) for Passerini. He was re-confirmed for a second term, receiving 59.46% of the weighted vote against 40.54% for centre-right candidate Elia Delmiglio.
