= List of presidents of the Province of Lodi =

President of the Province of Lodi
- Presidente della Provincia di Lodi
- Incumbent; Fabrizio Santantonio since 27 March 2022
- Term length: 4 years
- Inaugural holder: Lorenzo Guerini
- Formation: 1995

The president of the Province of Lodi is the head of the provincial government in Lodi, Lombardy, Italy. The president oversees the administration of the province, coordinates the activities of the municipalities, and represents the province in regional and national matters.

Since March 2022, the office has been held by Fabrizio Santantonio, a centre-left independent.

== History ==
The Province of Lodi was established in 1992, after being separated from the Province of Milan. In its initial phase, the new province was administered by a government-appointed extraordinary commissioner, pending the organisation of its institutional bodies. Following the 1995 elections, Lorenzo Guerini took office as the first president of the province, marking the beginning of the province's ordinary democratic administration. In accordance with the reform of local authorities introduced in 1993, the president was directly elected by the citizens for a five-year term and was responsible for appointing and dismissing the members of the Provincial Executive.

Following the 2014 Delrio Law, the president is elected by an assembly composed of the mayors and municipal councillors of the municipalities within the province. The president serves a four-year term and acts as the legal representative of the province, presiding over the Provincial Council and the Provincial Assembly of Mayors.

== List ==
No.	Portrait	Name	Term		Party	Election
No.	Portrait	Name	Start	End	Party	Election
1		Lorenzo Guerini	8 May 1995	28 June 1999	Italian People's Party; The Daisy	1995
1		Lorenzo Guerini	28 June 1999	28 June 2004	Italian People's Party; The Daisy	1999
2		Lino Osvaldo Felissari	28 June 2004	8 June 2009	Democrats of the Left; Democratic Party	2004
3		Pietro Foroni	8 June 2009	6 May 2013	Lega Nord	2009
–		Cristiano Devecchi (acting)	6 May 2013	30 September 2014	Lega Nord	2009
4		Mauro Soldati	30 September 2014	5 October 2017	Democratic Party	2014
–		Giuseppe Russo (acting)	5 October 2017	6 February 2018	Democratic Party	2014
5		Francesco Passerini	6 February 2018	27 March 2022	Lega Nord	2018
6		Fabrizio Santantonio	27 March 2022	13 April 2026	Independent (centre-left)	2022
6		Fabrizio Santantonio	13 April 2026	Incumbent	Independent (centre-left)	2026
