= Fondazione Eni Enrico Mattei =

Italian research center and think tank

- Named after: Enrico Mattei
- Established: June 7, 1989
- Purpose: Environment, sustainable development and global governance
- Location: Milan, Venice, Viggiano, Italy
- Leader: Alessandro Lanza
- Website: www.feem.it/en/

Fondazione Eni Enrico Mattei (FEEM) is a nonprofit, nonpartisan research center and think tank based in Milan with offices in Venice and Viggiano. FEEM is considered a leading international research center for the study of energy and environmental issues, focusing globally on the environment, sustainable development and governance. The Foundation's mission is the research-based improvement of the quality of public and private sector decision-making.

== History ==
Fondazione Eni Enrico Mattei was organized by members of the Ente Nazionale Idrocarburi (ENI) and others, beginning in 1982. The first board meeting occurred in 1987, setting down the principles for its activities. Named to honor Enrico Mattei, FEEM was formally recognized on June 7, 1989 by the President of the Italian Republic Francesco Cossiga.

== Leadership ==
As of 21 September 2020, Alessandro Lanza was appointed as the Executive Director of Fondazione Eni Enrico Mattei by the FEEM Board of Directors, succeeding Paolo Carnevale. The chair of FEEM's board of directors is Lucia Calvosa.

== Work ==
Fondazione Eni Enrico Mattei carries out research and provides objective analysis on a range of issues relating to the environment, energy and the global economy, including mitigation and adaptation to climate change. FEEM works with an international and interdisciplinary network of researchers in innovative programs, providing and promoting training in specialized research fields, disseminating the results of their studies through various communication channels and informing policy makers through participation in various institutional forums.

In 2009 FEEM and the Giorgio Cini Foundation co-founded the International Center for Climate Governance, renamed the Initiative on Climate Change policy and Governance (ICCG) as of 2017. ICCG is based in Venice on the island of San Giorgio Maggiore. It serves as an international disseminator of research on climate change policy and governance. In 2012, ICCG released the first in a series of international rankings of think tanks engaged in research on climate change science, economics, and policy.

Among other activities, in April 2019 FEEM worked with the Sustainable Development Solutions Network (SDSN) to bring together a worldwide group of experts on decarbonization technologies, resulting in the report The Roadmap to 2050: A Manual for Countries to Decarbonize by Mid-Century.
