= Foroni =

Foroni is a surname. Notable people with the surname include:

- Antonietta Foroni-Conti (1822-187?), Italian operatic soprano
- Domenico Foroni (1796-1853), Italian composer, conductor, and music educator; father of Jacopo Foroni and Antonietta Foroni-Conti
- Jacopo Foroni (1825-1858), Italian composer and conductor; son of Domenico Foroni
- Pietro Foroni, provincial president of Lega Nord for Lodi (Lombardy)
