= Bascapè =

- Comune
- Comune di Bascapè
- Location within Italy Location within Lombardy
- Coordinates: 45°18′N 9°19′E
- Country: Italy
- Region: Lombardy
- Province: Pavia (PV)

Government
  - Mayor: Emanuela Curti

Area
  - Total: 13.34 km^{2} (5.15 sq mi)
- Elevation: 89 m (292 ft)

Population (30 April 2017)
  - Total: 1,788
  - Density: 134.0/km^{2} (347.1/sq mi)
- Demonym: Bascaprini
- Time zone: UTC+1 (CET)
  - Summer (DST): UTC+2 (CEST)
- Postal code: 27010
- Dialing code: 0382
- Website: Official website

Bascapè is a comune (municipality) in the Province of Pavia in the Italian region Lombardy, located about 20 kilometres (12 mi) southeast of Milan and about 20 kilometres (12 mi) northeast of Pavia.

Bascapè borders the following municipalities: Carpiano, Casaletto Lodigiano, Caselle Lurani, Cerro al Lambro, Landriano, Torrevecchia Pia, and Valera Fratta.

== History ==
On October 27, 1962, Enrico Mattei, on a flight from Catania, Sicily to Milan's Linate Airport, died when his jet airplane, a Morane-Saulnier MS.760 Paris, crashed in the countryside near Bascapè. Pilot Irnerio Bertuzzi and the American journalist William McHale were also killed with Mattei. Subsequent inquiries officially declared that it was an accident; it is widely believed, however, that Mattei was murdered by sabotage of the airplane.
