= Pietro Foroni =

Italian politician (born 1975)

Regional assessor for Territory and Civil Protection of Lombardy
- In office 5 April 2018 – 10 March 2023
- President: Attilio Fontana

Member of the Regional Council of Lombardy
- In office 27 March 2013 – 5 April 2018

President of the Province of Lodi
- In office 8 June 2009 – 6 May 2013
- Preceded by: Lino Osvaldo Felissari
- Succeeded by: Mauro Soldati

Mayor of Maleo
- In office 14 June 2004 – 2 May 2013
- Preceded by: Mario Grazioli
- Succeeded by: Giuseppe Maggi

Personal details
- Born: 23 July 1975 (age 51) Codogno, Lombardy, Italy
- Party: Lega Nord; Lega
- Education: University of Pavia
- Occupation: Lawyer

Pietro Foroni (born 23 July 1975) is an Italian politician of the Lega. He served as president of the Province of Lodi from 2009 to 2013 and as mayor of Maleo from 2004 to 2013. From 2018 to 2023, he served as regional assessor for territory and civil protection in the government of Lombardy.

== Life and career ==
Foroni graduated in law from the University of Pavia in 2000 and has worked as a lawyer.

Foroni was elected mayor of Maleo in 2004 as a candidate of the Lega Nord. In June 2009, he was elected president of the Province of Lodi, succeeding Lino Osvaldo Felissari. He served until May 2013, when he resigned from both offices.

In the 2013 Lombardy regional election, Foroni was elected to the Regional Council of Lombardy on the Lega list. Re-elected in 2018, he was appointed regional assessor for territory and civil protection in Attilio Fontana's first regional government. He held the position until February 2023.
