= Cerro al Lambro =

- Comune
- Comune di Cerro al Lambro
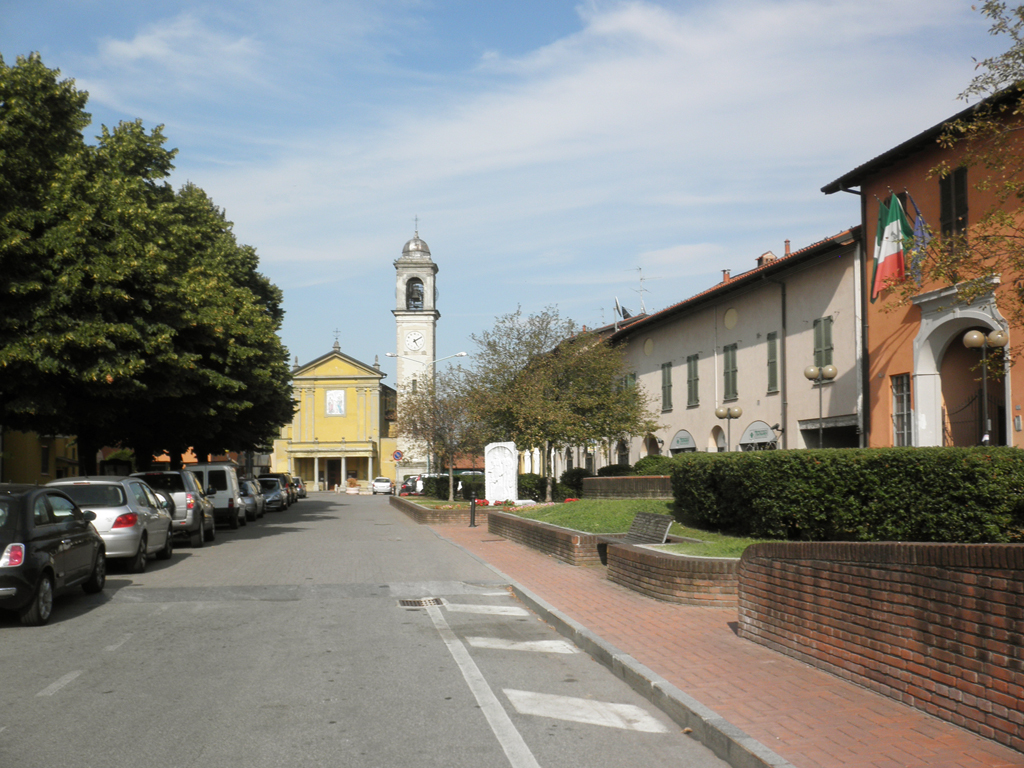

- Location within Italy Location within Lombardy
- Coordinates: 45°19′51″N 9°20′29″E
- Country: Italy
- Region: Lombardy
- Metropolitan city: Milan (MI)

Government
  - Mayor: Gianluca Di Cesare

Area
  - Total: 10.15 km^{2} (3.92 sq mi)
- Elevation: 84 m (276 ft)

Population (31 March 2018)
  - Total: 5,124
  - Density: 504.8/km^{2} (1,307/sq mi)
- Demonym: Cerresi
- Time zone: UTC+1 (CET)
  - Summer (DST): UTC+2 (CEST)
- Postal code: 20077
- Dialing code: 02
- Website: Official website

Cerro al Lambro (Milanese: Cerr [ˈtʃɛr]) is a comune (municipality) in the Metropolitan City of Milan in the Italian region Lombardy, located about 20 kilometres (12 mi) southeast of Milan.

Cerro al Lambro borders the following municipalities: Vizzolo Predabissi (MI), Carpiano (MI), Melegnano (MI), San Zenone al Lambro (MI), Bascapè (PV) and Casaletto Lodigiano (LO).
