= Marcello Boldrini =

Italian statistician (1890–1969)

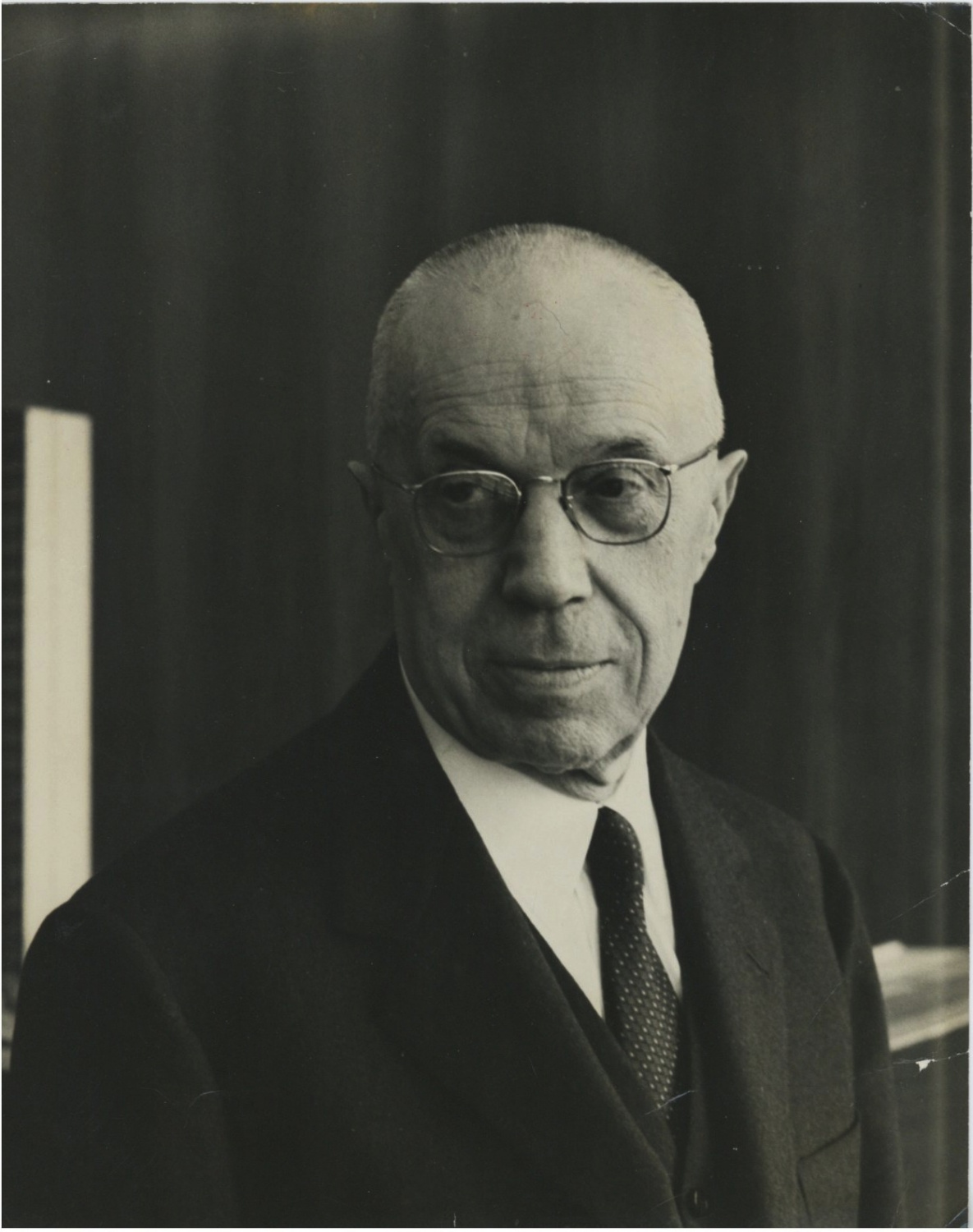
Marcello Boldrini

Marcello Boldrini (9 February 1890, in Matelica – 5 March 1969, in Milan) was an Italian statistician.

== Biography ==
Beginning in 1922, he taught courses in statistics, biometry, and demography at Bocconi University of Milan, and then at the University of Rome as Emeritus Professor. He was also a member of several academies and institutes in Italy and abroad, serving for several years as president of the International Statistical Institute. His scientific research was on both methodological and applied statistics, particularly on demography, anthropometry, and economics. As a statistician, he has been particularly interested in the foundations of the method, and he proposed a view of statistics as an empirical history of all the positive sciences. To deepen this research he founded a statistical Laboratory at the Catholic University of Milan. The results are widely discussed in the volumes, Statistica: Teoria e metodi (first edition, 1942), and Teoria della Statistica (1963), which have been studied by thousands of students. For Boldrini, Statistics is a formal science like mathematics and logic, but it is different from them as a scientific inquiry method in the inductive and deductive phases of research.

Beyond academic commitment, he also had several management positions in the state oil industry: he was first named president of Agip (1948–1953), was then vice-president of ENI (1953–1962), before succeeding Enrico Mattei as president in 1962, remaining in the post until 1967.

== Academic Positions ==
Professor of Statistics and Demography at the Universities of Messina, Padua, Milan and Rome. Dean of Political Sciences, Milan Catholic University (1043-1945).

== Honours, memberships ==
Member of the Pontifical Academy, Accademia dei Lincei, Honoris Causa at the University of Rio de Janeiro. Professor emeritus at Rome University.

== Selected works ==
=== English ===
- Scientific Truth and Statistical Method, translated by Ruth Kendall, Griffin (1972) ISBN 0-8526-4197-4

=== Italian ===
- Biometrica, CEDAM (1927);
- Demografia, A. Giuffrè (1943);
- Statistica in Compendio, A. Giuffrè (1957)
- Teoria della Statistica, A. Giuffrè (1963).
- Statistica, Teoria e Metodi, A. Giuffrè (5th ed. 1968)
