= Carpiano =

Carpiano Carpian (Lombard)
- Comune
- Comune di Carpiano
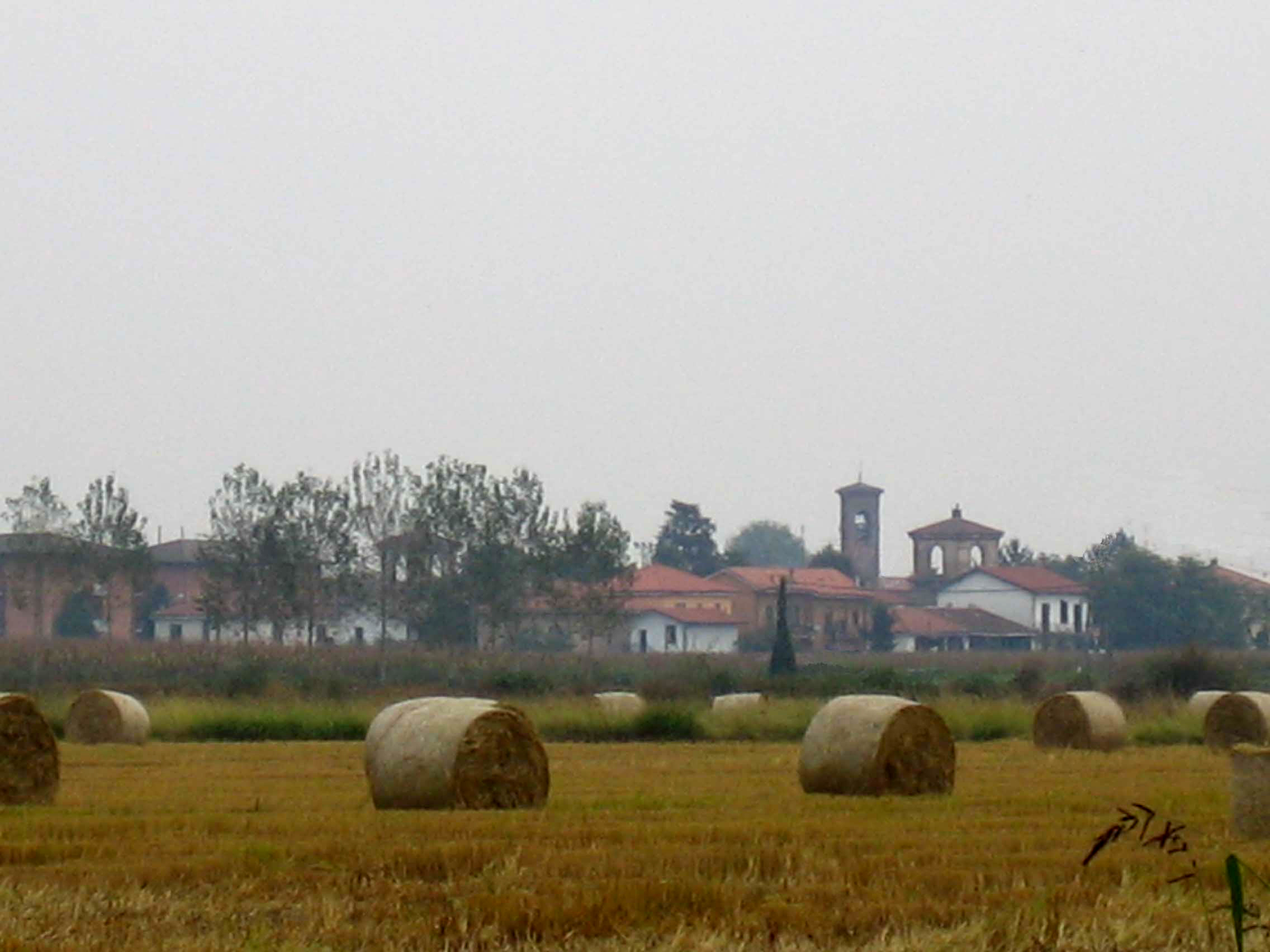

- Coat of arms

- Location within Italy Location within Lombardy
- Coordinates: 45°20′N 9°16′E
- Country: Italy
- Region: Lombardy
- Metropolitan city: Milan (MI)
- Frazioni: Draghetto, Francolino, Ortigherio

Government
  - Mayor: Loris Carmagnani

Area
  - Total: 17.2 km^{2} (6.6 sq mi)
- Elevation: 91 m (299 ft)

Population (30 November 2025)
  - Total: 4,108
  - Density: 239/km^{2} (619/sq mi)
- Demonym: Carpianesi
- Time zone: UTC+1 (CET)
  - Summer (DST): UTC+2 (CEST)
- Postal code: 20074
- Dialing code: 02
- Patron saint: St. Martin
- Saint day: 11 November
- Website: Official website

Carpiano (Milanese: Carpian [karˈpjãː]) is a comune (municipality) in the Metropolitan City of Milan in the Italian region Lombardy, located about 15 kilometres (9 mi) southeast of Milan.

Carpiano borders the following municipalities: San Giuliano Milanese, Locate di Triulzi, Melegnano, Cerro al Lambro, Siziano, Landriano and Bascapè.
