= Castiraga Vidardo =

- Comune
- Comune di Castiraga Vidardo
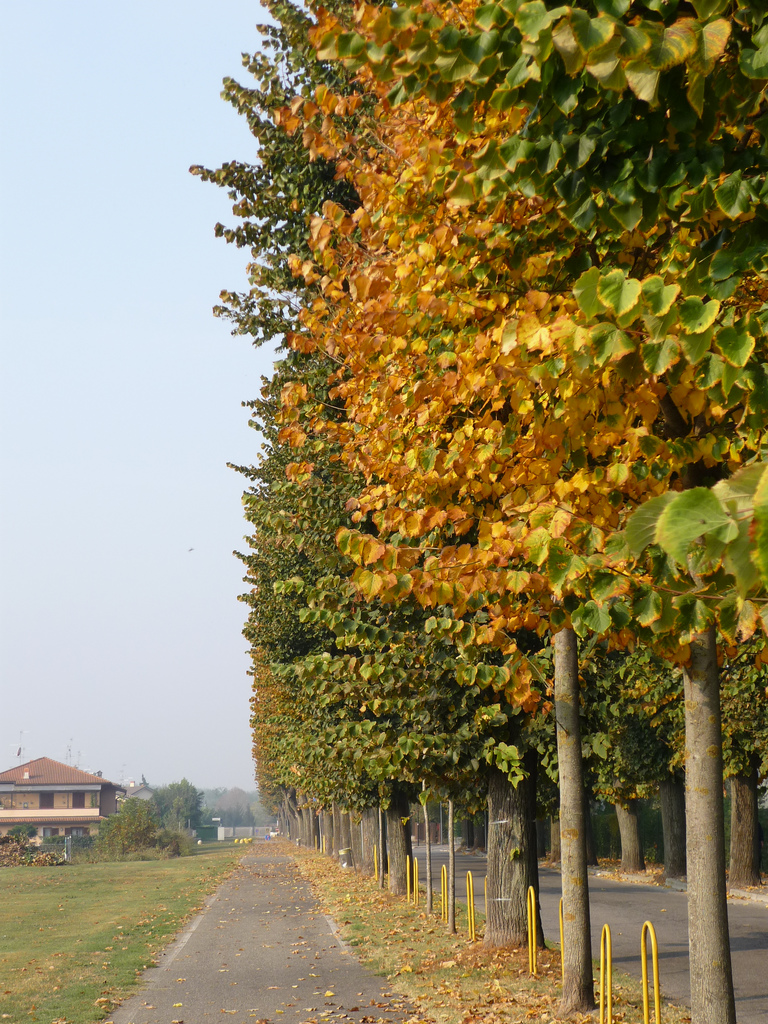

- Location within Italy Location within Lombardy
- Coordinates: 45°16′N 9°26′E
- Country: Italy
- Region: Lombardy
- Province: Lodi (LO)

Government
  - Mayor: Emma Perfetti

Area
  - Total: 5.3 km^{2} (2.0 sq mi)
- Elevation: 74 m (243 ft)

Population (30 June 2017)
  - Total: 2,818
  - Density: 530/km^{2} (1,400/sq mi)
- Demonym: Vidardesi
- Time zone: UTC+1 (CET)
  - Summer (DST): UTC+2 (CEST)
- Postal code: 26866
- Dialing code: 0371
- Website: Official website

Castiraga Vidardo (Lodigiano: Vidàrd) is a comune (municipality) in the Province of Lodi in the Italian region Lombardy, located about 30 kilometres (19 mi) southeast of Milan and about 8 kilometres (5 mi) southwest of Lodi.

Castiraga Vidardo borders the following municipalities: Salerano sul Lambro, Borgo San Giovanni, Caselle Lurani, Marudo, Sant'Angelo Lodigiano.

The double name of this village comes from the two biggest frazioni, Castiraga da Reggio and Vidardo, previously part of the commune of Marudo.
