= Casaletto Lodigiano =

- Comune
- Comune di Casaletto Lodigiano
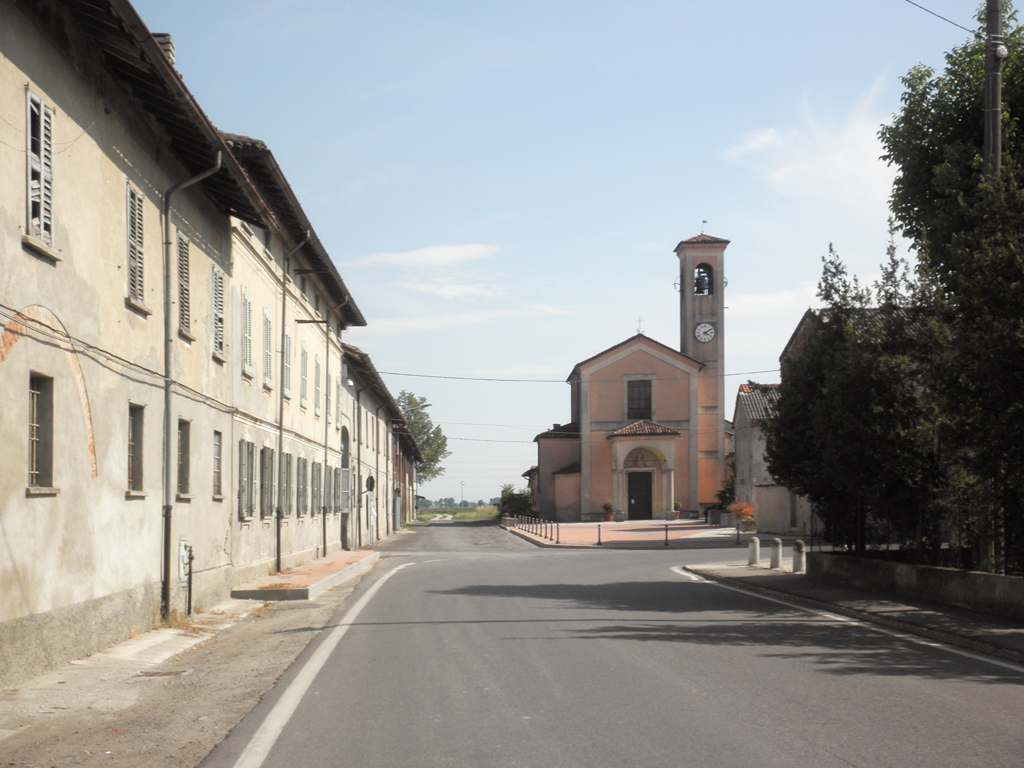
- View

- Location within Italy Location within Lombardy
- Coordinates: 45°19′N 9°20′E
- Country: Italy
- Region: Lombardy
- Province: Lodi (LO)
- Frazioni: Gugnano, Mairano

Government
  - Mayor: Nathalie Sitzia

Area
  - Total: 9.75 km^{2} (3.76 sq mi)
- Elevation: 80 m (260 ft)

Population (31 May 2017)
  - Total: 2,913
  - Density: 299/km^{2} (774/sq mi)
- Demonym: Casalettesi
- Time zone: UTC+1 (CET)
  - Summer (DST): UTC+2 (CEST)
- Postal code: 26852
- Dialing code: 0371
- Website: Official website

Casaletto Lodigiano (Lodigiano: Casalètt) is a comune (municipality) in the Province of Lodi in the Italian region Lombardy, located about 20 kilometres (12 mi) southeast of Milan and about 13 kilometres (8 mi) west of Lodi.

Casaletto Lodigiano borders the following municipalities: Cerro al Lambro, San Zenone al Lambro, Bascapè, Salerano sul Lambro, Caselle Lurani.
