= Castelgerundo =

- Comune
- Comune di Castelgerundo
- Location within Italy Location within Lombardy
- Coordinates: 45.201635°N 9.741096°E
- Country: Italy
- Region: Lombardy
- Province: Lodi (LO)
- Frazioni: Bosco Valentino, Camairago, Cavacurta, Mulazzana

Government
  - Mayor: Daniele Saltarelli

Area
  - Total: 19.87 km^{2} (7.67 sq mi)

Population (January 2018)
  - Total: 1,489
  - Density: 74.94/km^{2} (194.1/sq mi)
- Time zone: UTC+1 (CET)
  - Summer (DST): UTC+2 (CEST)
- Postal code: 26823 Camairago; 26844 Cavacurta
- Dialing code: 0377
- Website: Official website

Castelgerundo is a new comune (municipality) in the Province of Lodi in the Italian region Lombardy, located about 55 kilometres (34 mi) southeast of Milan and about 25 kilometres (16 mi) southeast of Lodi.

Casrelgerundo borders the following municipalities: Formigara, Castiglione d'Adda, Maleo, Terranova dei Passerini, Pizzighettone, Cavacurta, Codogno.

The new municipality, from 1 January 2018, was made from the union of Cavacurta and Camairago. The municipality contains also the frazione (subdivision) Bosco Valentino e Mulazzana.

== History ==
The process for union of the municipalities of Camairago and Cavacurta started in 2016. On 22 October 2017 a referendum was held which gave positive results.

The following 28 November the union of the two municipalities was approved by the Regional Council of Lombardy.
