= Valera Fratta =

Valera Fratta Valéra
- Comune
- Comune di Valera Fratta
- Coat of arms

- Location within Italy Location within Lombardy
- Coordinates: 45°17′N 9°18′E
- Country: Italy
- Region: Lombardy
- Province: Lodi (LO)

Government
  - Mayor: Giorgio Bozzini

Area
  - Total: 8.2 km^{2} (3.2 sq mi)
- Elevation: 78 m (256 ft)

Population (30 November 2012)
  - Total: 1,685
  - Density: 210/km^{2} (530/sq mi)
- Demonym: Valeriani
- Time zone: UTC+1 (CET)
  - Summer (DST): UTC+2 (CEST)
- Postal code: 26859
- Dialing code: 0371
- Website: Official website

Valera Fratta (Lodigiano: Valéra) is a comune (municipality) in the Province of Lodi in the Italian region Lombardy, located about 25 kilometres (16 mi) southeast of Milan and about 15 kilometres (9 mi) west of Lodi.

Valera Fratta borders the following municipalities: Bascapè, Torrevecchia Pia, Caselle Lurani, Marzano, Marudo, Villanterio, Torre d'Arese.
