= Enrico Mattei =

20th-century Italian politician and businessman

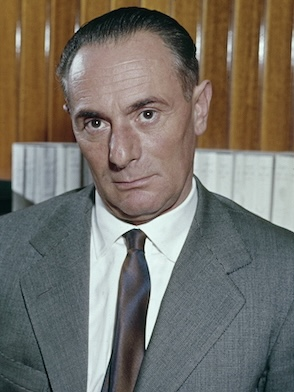

Chairman of Eni
- In office 10 February 1953 – 27 October 1962
- Preceded by: Office established
- Succeeded by: Marcello Boldrini

Member of the Chamber of Deputies
- In office 8 May 1948 – 24 June 1953
- Constituency: Milan

Personal details
- Born: 29 April 1906 Acqualagna, Italy
- Died: 27 October 1962 (aged 56) Bascapè, Italy
- Cause of death: Aircrash
- Party: Christian Democracy
- Occupation: Public administrator
- Known for: Development of oil industry in Italy

Enrico Mattei (Italian pronunciation: [enˈriːko matˈtɛi]; 29 April 1906 – 27 October 1962) was an Italian public administrator. After World War II, he was given the task of dismantling the Italian petroleum agency Agip, a state enterprise established by Fascist Italy. Instead, Mattei enlarged and reorganized it into the National Fuel Trust (Italian: Ente Nazionale Idrocarburi, ENI). Under his direction, ENI negotiated important oil concessions in the Middle East as well as a significant trade agreement with the Soviet Union, which helped break the oligopoly of the "Seven Sisters" that dominated the mid-20th-century oil industry. He also introduced the principle whereby the country that owned exploited oil reserves received 75% of the profits.

Mattei, who became a powerful figure in Italy, was a member of Christian Democracy and of the Italian Parliament from 1948 to 1953. Mattei made ENI a powerful company, so much so that Italians called it "the state within the state". He died in a plane crash in 1962, likely caused by a bomb in the plane, although it has never been established which group might have been responsible for his death. The unsolved death of Mattei was the subject of an award-winning film The Mattei Affair by Francesco Rosi in 1972, with Mattei portrayed by Gian Maria Volonté. Along with Vittorio Valletta of Fiat S.p.A., he is regarded among the best Italian managers of the 20th century.

== Early life ==
Enrico Mattei was born in Acqualagna, in the province of Pesaro and Urbino, Marche, as the second of five children of Antonio Mattei (a carabiniere – a member of the Italian national gendarmerie) and Angela Galvani. In 1923, he became an apprentice in the tannery industry in Matelica. His career was rapid; from factory hand, he quickly moved on to become a chemical assistant and then to laboratory chief at the age of 21. After his military service, he became the tannery owner's chief assistant. However, the economic crisis at the end of the 1920s made business go from bad to worse until the tannery closed.

Mattei moved to Milan where he worked as a sales representative for foreign companies in tanning dyes and solvents. In 1931, he became a member of the National Fascist Party (Italian: Partito Nazionale Fascista) created by Benito Mussolini but was not active in politics. Subsequently, he set up a factory producing oil-based emulsifiers for the tanning and textile industries with his brother and sister. In 1934, he founded Industria Chimica Lombarda and two years later, in 1936, he married Greta Paulas, in Vienna. After acquiring an accountancy qualification, he enrolled at Università Cattolica del Sacro Cuore in Milan.

In May 1943, he met the Christian Democracy leader Giuseppe Spataro, who introduced him into anti-Fascist circles in Milan against the Italian fascist regime of Mussolini. After 25 July 1943, when Mussolini was forced to resign, Mattei joined a partisan group of the Italian resistance movement in the mountains around Matelica, supplying them with weapons. He was able to join the resistance, despite suspicion over his former membership of the Fascist party. His role was rather marginal, concentrating mainly on administering and organising activities. After a number of roundups, he escaped to Milan.

Impressed by his organisational and military skills, Christian Democrats put him in command of their partisan forces. On 26 October 1944, he was captured in Milan, along with others, at the Christian Democrats' secret headquarters in Milan. Detained at the military barracks in Como, he was able to escape on 3 December 1944, taking advantage of a confusion caused by a short circuit which he himself may have engineered. Mattei participated in the North Italian military command of the National Liberation Committee (Italian: Comitato di Liberazione Nazionale – CLN) on behalf of the Christian Democrats. He was decorated by the United States with the Silver Star.

== Agip and ENI ==
In 1945, the National Liberation Committee appointed him to the leadership of Agip (Azienda Generale Italiana Petrolio – General Italian Oil Company), the national oil company created by the Fascists, with instructions to close it as soon as possible. Mattei instead worked hard to restructure the company and transform it into one of the nation's most important economic assets.

In 1949 Mattei made an astonishing public announcement: the soil of the Po Valley in Northern Italy was rich in oil and methane, and Italy would solve all its energy needs using its own resources. Through the Italian press, he then encouraged the idea that the nation (still suffering from the consequences of World War II) would soon become rich. Agip's financial value immediately grew in the stock exchanges, and the company (owned by the state but operating as a private company) became at once solid and important. The reality was a little different; in the territory of Cortemaggiore, in the Valley of Po, a certain amount of methane had been found together with a small quantity of oil.

Mattei's strategy was to use natural gas to support the development of a national industry in Northern Italy, sustaining the postwar boom known as the Italian economic miracle. The gas was not a mere substitute for imported oil but rather a cheaper and more functional substitute for imported coal which the growing industrial activities relied on. High profits from natural gas sales were ploughed back into exploration, production, the expansion of pipelines, and the acquisition of new customers.

Agip obtained an exclusive concession for gas and oil exploration within the national territory, and was able to retain the profits. Political views were divided; the leftists supported him, and the conservatives (together with the industrialists) opposed him. At this time, Mattei is alleged to have widely used the unofficial financial resources of Agip for extensive bribery, especially of politicians and journalists. He used to say of political parties: "I use them like I would use a taxi: I sit in, I pay for the trip, I get out." Agip gained control of hundreds of companies in all economic fields in the country. Mattei paid great attention to the press, and Agip soon took possession of several newspapers and two agencies.

In 1953, a law created the ENI, Ente Nazionale Idrocarburi, into which Agip was merged. Mattei was initially its president, then also the administrator and the general director. In practice, ENI was Mattei and Mattei was ENI.

== International influence ==
When it became apparent that the domestic resource base would not be sufficient to meet Italy's growing energy demand, Mattei recognized the need to secure foreign supplies. Driven by his ambition to make ENI a player on par with the Exxons and Totals of the world, Mattei expanded abroad and turned his attention to the international oil markets. He used to tell very often a parable of a little cat: "One day a kitten, with innocent audacity, approached a pack of dogs around a bowl full of soup to claim his share of food, only to be sent away with a powerful swipe of a paw, leaving it dazed on the ground. We were that kitten for many years, but now we are a solid entity which can look towards the future."

This kind of fable made Mattei extremely popular in the economically poor Italy of the time, and he gained the popular support that was needed to gain political support. To break the oligopoly of the "Seven Sisters", a term he coined to refer to the dominant oil companies of the mid-20th century, Mattei initiated agreements with the poorest countries of the Middle East and countries of the former Eastern Bloc as well. Mattei visited Moscow in 1959, where he brokered an oil import deal with the Soviet Union in the middle of the Cold War over intense protests from NATO and the United States. He also publicly supported independence movements against colonial powers, which allowed ENI to take advantage of postcolonial bitterness in places like Algeria. To opponents who charged that he was helping Communists and making Italy dependent on a capricious flow from the Soviet Union, Mattei answered that he bought from the cheapest sources.

Mattei forged agreements with Tunisia and Morocco, to which he offered a 50–50 partnership for extracting their oil, very different from the sort of concessions normally offered by the major oil companies. To Iran and Egypt, he additionally offered that the risk involved in prospecting was entirely ENI's: if there was no petrol, the countries would not have to pay one cent. In 1957, with ENI already competing with giants like Esso or Shell, rumour has it that Mattei was secretly financing the independence movement against colonialist France in the Algerian War.

In 1960, after concluding the agreement with the Soviet Union and while negotiating with China, Mattei publicly declared that the American monopoly was over. The reaction was initially mild, and he was invited to take part in the partition of the prospecting map in the Sahara. Mattei made the independence of Algeria a condition of his acceptance, and no agreement would be subscribed until that event. As a consequence of his stance, Mattei was considered to have become a target of the French far-right terrorist organization Organisation armée secrète (OAS), opposed to Algeria's independence, which began sending him explicit threats.

== Death ==
On a 27 October 1962 flight from Catania, Sicily, to the Milan Linate Airport, Mattei's jetplane, a Morane-Saulnier MS.760 Paris, crashed in the surroundings of the small village of Bascapè in Lombardy. The cause of the accident has been a mystery. There are strong indications that the crash was caused by a bomb hidden in the aeroplane. All three men on board were killed: Mattei, his pilot Irnerio Bertuzzi, and the American Time–Life journalist William McHale. The inquiries officially declared that it was an accident. The Italian Minister of Defense, Giulio Andreotti, was responsible for the accident investigation.

During his controversial tenure at ENI, Mattei had made many enemies. The U.S. National Security Council described him as an irritation and an obstacle in a classified report from 1958. The French could not forgive him for doing business with the pro-independence movement in Algeria. Responsibility for his death has been attributed to the CIA, to the French OAS, and to the Sicilian Mafia.

According to a 2001 TV documentary by Bernhard Pletschinger and Claus Bredenbrock, evidence was immediately destroyed at the crash site. Flight instruments were put into acid. On 25 October 1995, the Italian public service broadcaster RAI reported the exhumation of the human remains of Mattei and Bertuzzi. Metal debris deformed by an explosion was found in the bones. There is speculation that the fuse of an explosive device was triggered by the mechanism of the landing gear. In 1994, the investigations were reopened. In 1997, a metal indicator and a ring were further analyzed by Donato Firrao of the Polytechnic University of Turin and explosion tracks were found. Based on this evidence, the episode was reclassified by the judge as a homicide but with one or more perpetrators unknown.

Not trusting the Armed Forces Information Service (Servizio informazioni forze armate, SIFAR), Italy's secret service, even though it was full of his loyal supporters, Mattei constituted a sort of personal security guard made of former partisans, ENI staff by whom he felt protected.

=== Theories about his death ===
According to Phillipe Thyraud de Vosjoli, a former agent of the French secret service SDECE, SDECE agents were responsible for the 1962 plane crash which took the life of Mattei. Mattei was on the verge of engineering an Italian takeover of French oil interests in Algeria. A French agent code-named Laurent sabotaged Mattei's aircraft.

When preparing the film The Mattei Affair in 1970, Francesco Rosi asked the journalist Mauro De Mauro to investigate the last days of Mattei in Sicily. De Mauro soon obtained an audio-tape of his last speech and spent days studying it. De Mauro disappeared eight days after he retrieved the tape on 16 September 1970 without leaving a trace. His body was never found. It has been suggested that he was killed on the orders of Stefano Bontade, a boss in the Sicilian mafia, for his investigation. All the Carabinieri and police investigators who searched for De Mauro, and consequently investigated his presumed kidnapping, were later killed. Among them, the general Carlo Alberto Dalla Chiesa and Boris Giuliano were both killed by the Mafia.

Tommaso Buscetta, an important Mafia turncoat (pentito), declared that the Sicilian Mafia had been involved in the murder of Mattei. According to Buscetta, Mattei was killed at the request of Angelo Bruno of the American Mafia because his policies had damaged important American interests in the Middle East. Gaetano Iannì, another pentito, declared that a special agreement had been achieved between the Sicilian Mafia and some foreigners for the elimination of Mattei, which was organized by Giuseppe Di Cristina. These statements triggered new inquiries, including the exhumation of Mattei's corpse.

Admiral Fulvio Martini, later chief of SISMI (Italy's military secret service), declared that Mattei's plane had been shot down. In 1986, former Italian Prime Minister Amintore Fanfani described the accident as a shooting, perhaps the first act of terrorism in Italy.

== Legacy ==
Mattei is a controversial figure in Italian 20th-century history. Mattei made ENI a powerful company, so much so that Italians dub it "the state within the state". Some describe him as a sort of paladin, a nationalist, while others point to his hunger for power, and his cold calculating nature.

Mattei coined the term "Seven Sisters" (sette sorelle) to refer to the dominant oil companies of the mid-20th century. In 2000, the Trans-Mediterranean Pipeline, a natural gas pipeline from Algeria via Tunisia to Sicily and thence to mainland Italy, was named after Mattei. ENI named a research institute after Mattei. The Fondazione Eni Enrico Mattei (FEEM) is a nonprofit, nonpartisan research institution devoted to the study of sustainable development and global governance. FEEM's mission is to improve the quality of decision-making in public and private spheres.
