= Senna Lodigiana =

- Comune
- Comune di Senna Lodigiana
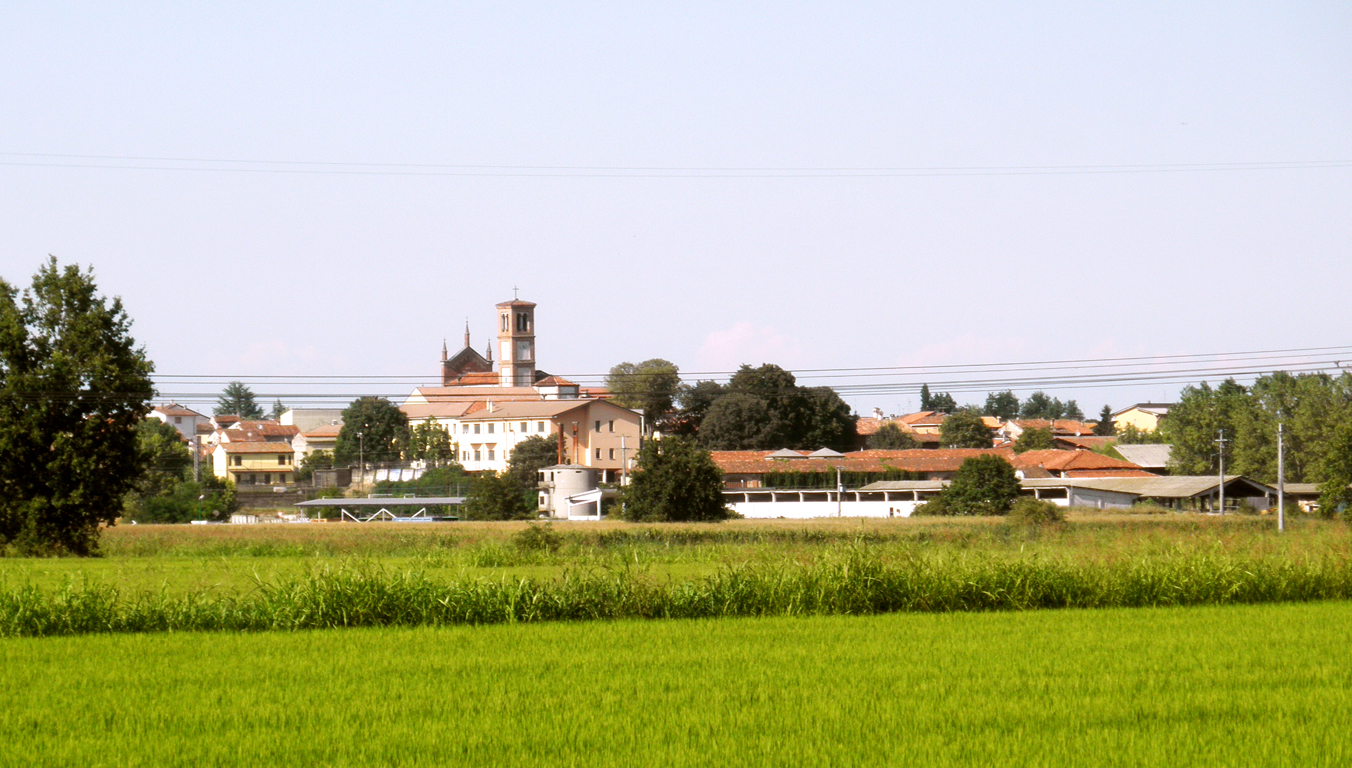

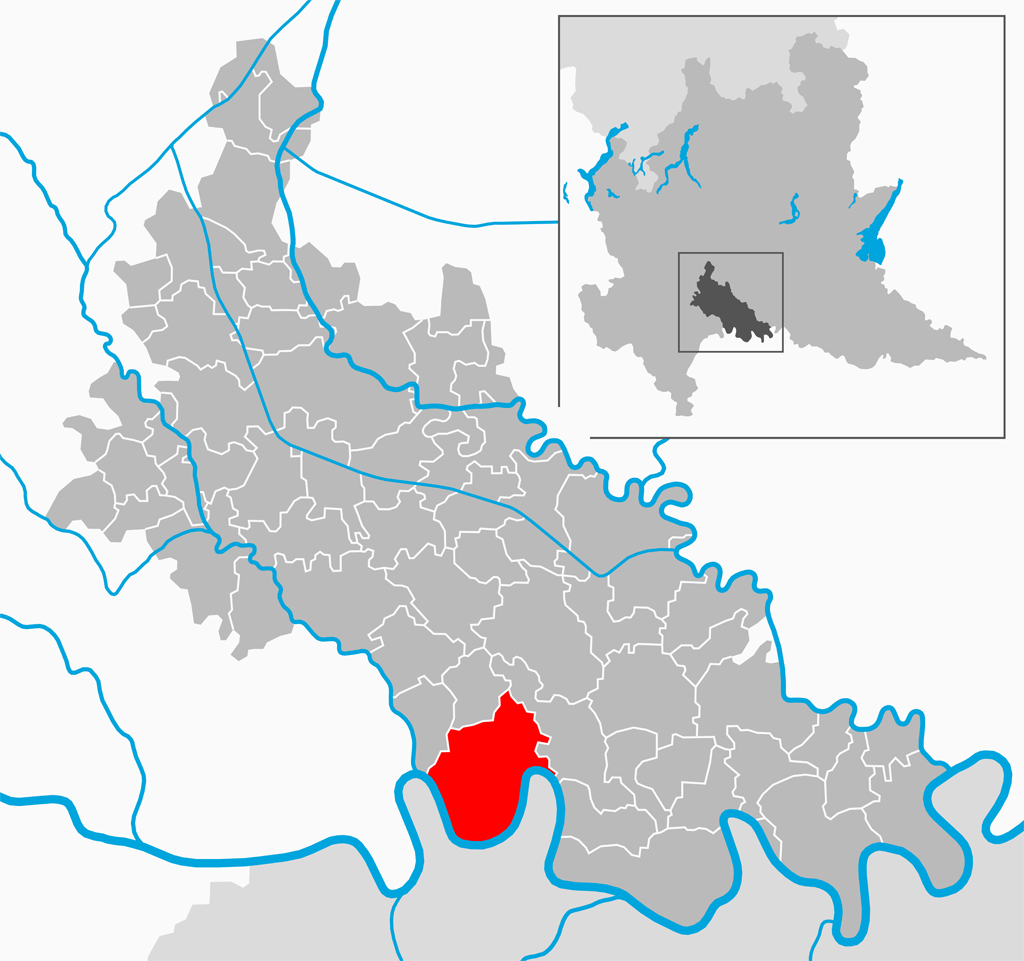

- Location within Italy Location within Lombardy
- Coordinates: 45°8′N 9°35′E
- Country: Italy
- Region: Lombardy
- Province: Lodi (LO)
- Frazioni: Corte Sant'Andrea

Government
  - Mayor: Francesco Antonio Premoli

Area
  - Total: 26.9 km^{2} (10.4 sq mi)

Population (Dec. 2004)
  - Total: 2,073
  - Density: 77.1/km^{2} (200/sq mi)
- Time zone: UTC+1 (CET)
  - Summer (DST): UTC+2 (CEST)
- Postal code: 26856
- Dialing code: 0377
- Website: Official website

Senna Lodigiana (Lodigiano: Sèna) is a comune (municipality) in the Province of Lodi in the Italian region Lombardy, located about 50 kilometres (31 mi) southeast of Milan and about 20 kilometres (12 mi) southeast of Lodi.

Passum Padi, the place where Via Francigena cross the Po River, is included in the communal territory.
