= Caselle Lurani =

- Comune
- Comune di Caselle Lurani
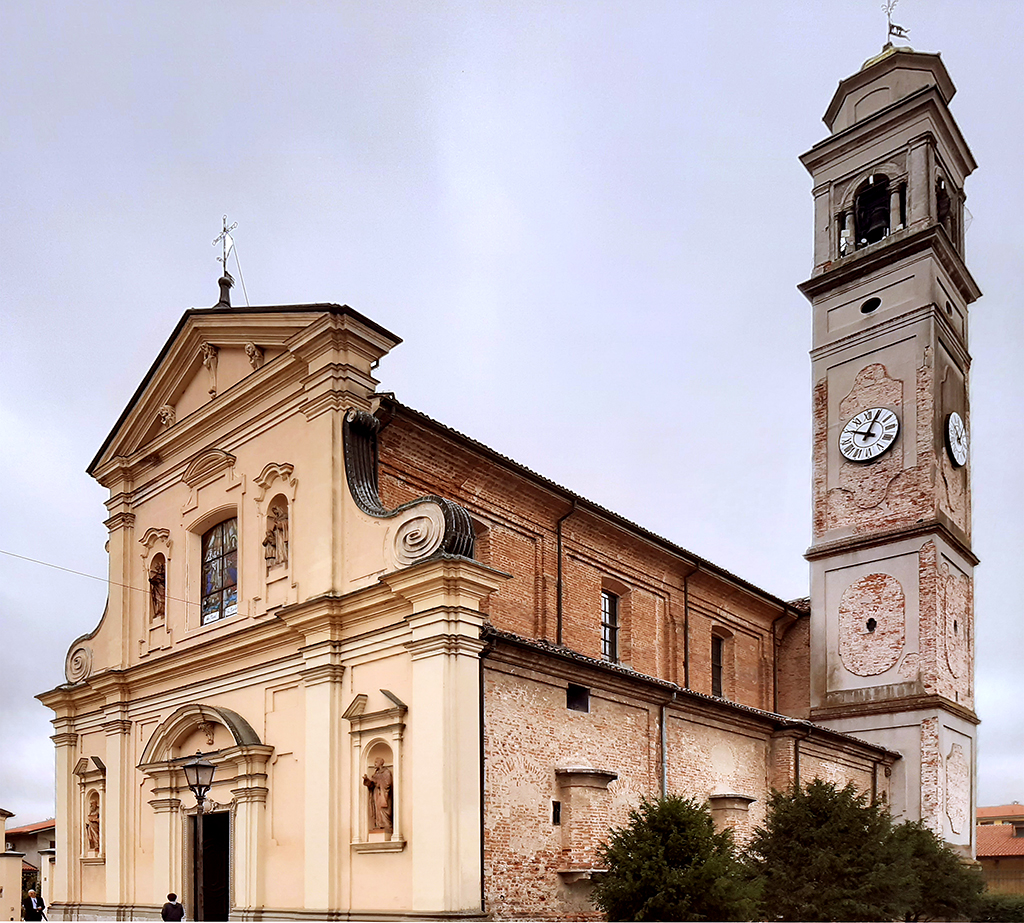

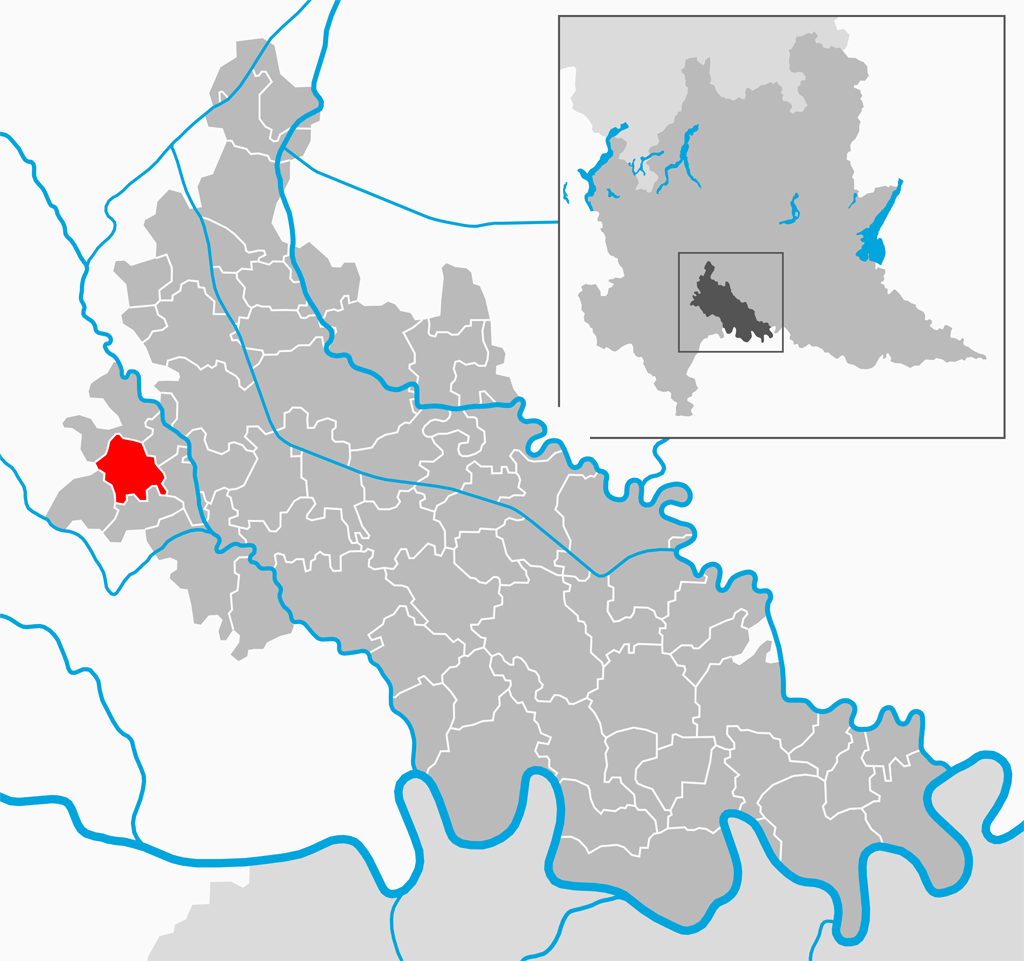

- Location within Italy Location within Lombardy
- Coordinates: 45°19′N 9°20′E
- Country: Italy
- Region: Lombardy
- Province: Lodi (LO)
- Frazioni: Calvenzano, Cusanina..

Government
  - Mayor: Davide Vighi

Area
  - Total: 7.6 km^{2} (2.9 sq mi)
- Elevation: 80 m (260 ft)

Population (31 May 2017)
  - Total: 3,000
  - Density: 390/km^{2} (1,000/sq mi)
- Demonym: Casellesi
- Time zone: UTC+1 (CET)
  - Summer (DST): UTC+2 (CEST)
- Postal code: 26853
- Dialing code: 0371
- Website: Official website

Caselle Lurani (Lodigiano: Le Casèle) is a comune (municipality) in the Province of Lodi in the Italian region Lombardy, located about 20 kilometres (12 mi) southeast of Milan and about 13 kilometres (8.1 mi) west of Lodi.

Caselle Lurani borders the following municipalities: Bascapè, Casaletto Lodigiano, Salerano sul Lambro, Castiraga Vidardo, Valera Fratta, Marudo.
