= Sant'Angelo Lodigiano =

- Comune
- Città di Sant'Angelo Lodigiano
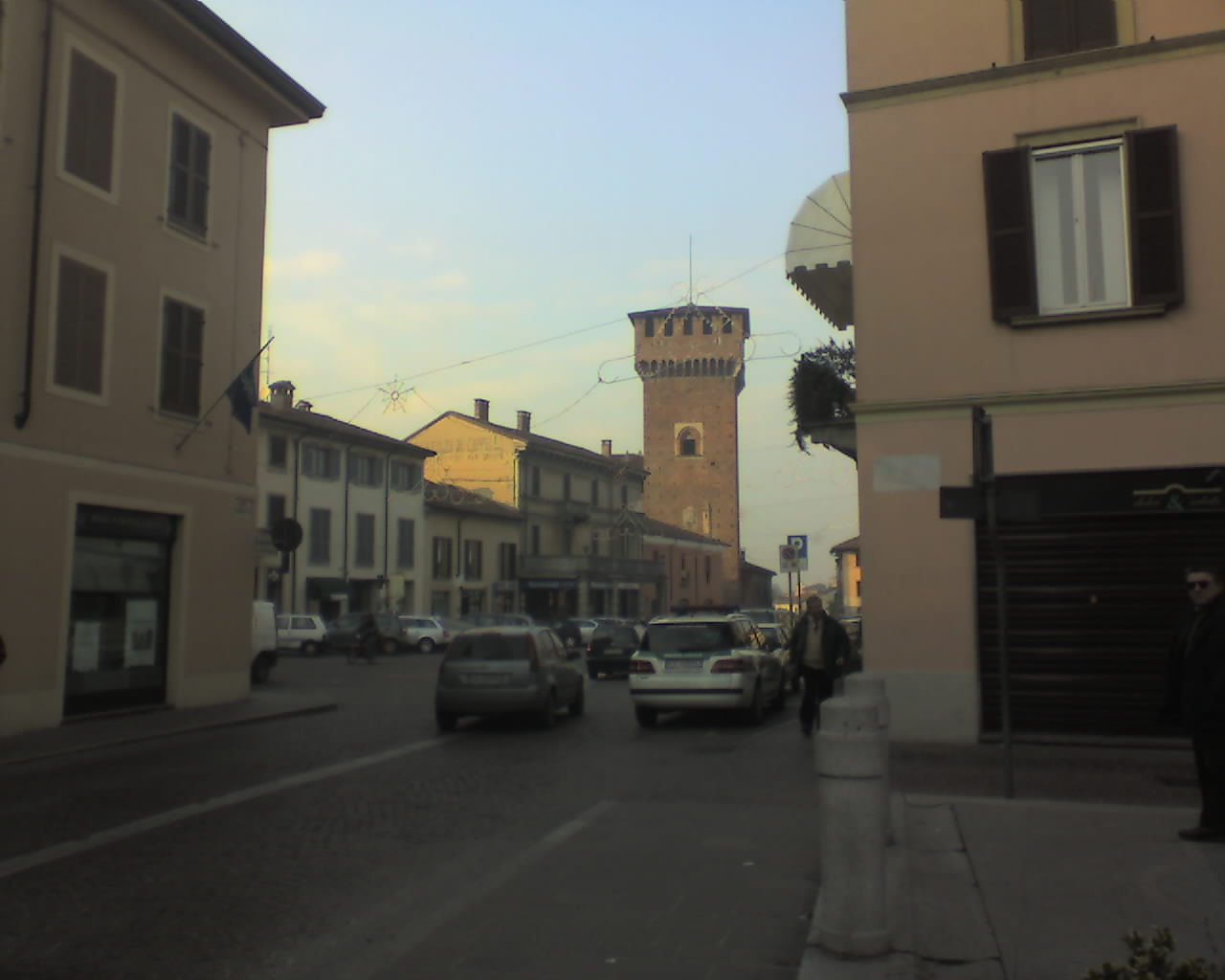

- Coat of arms

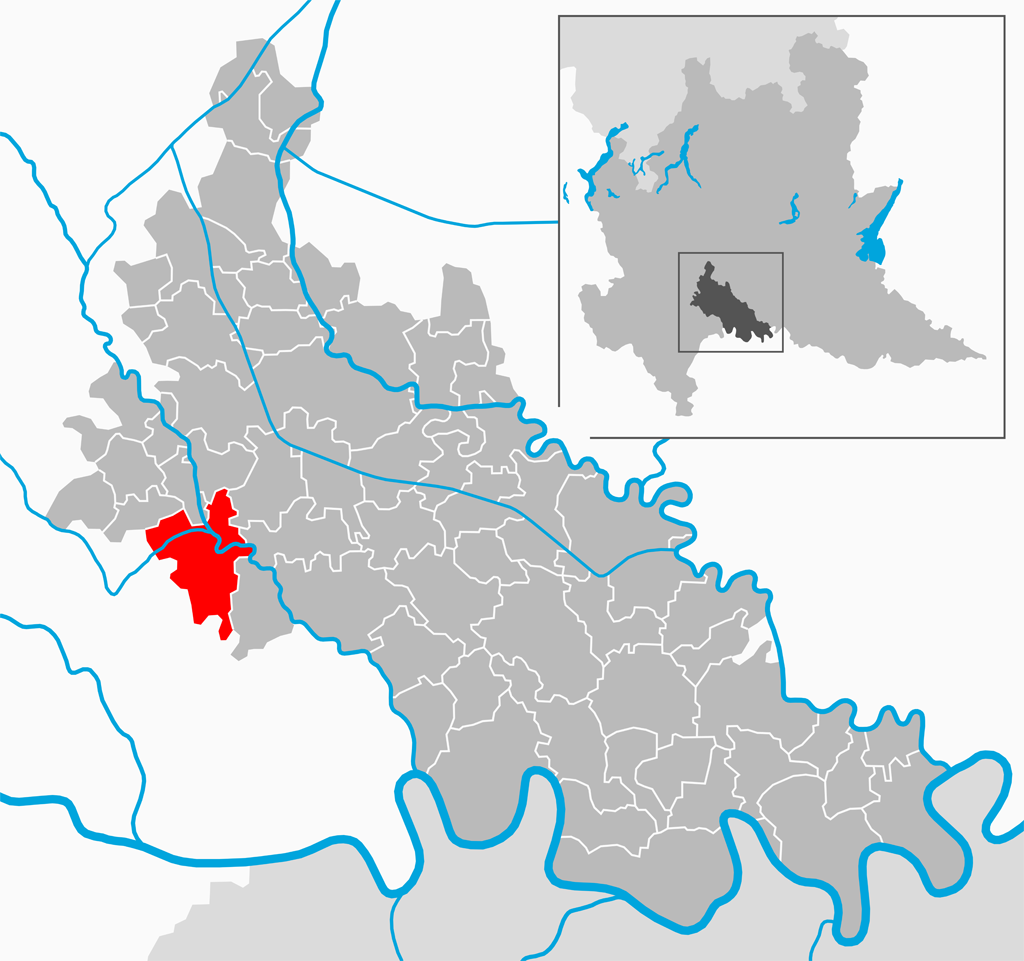

- Location within Italy Location within Lombardy
- Coordinates: 45°14′N 9°24′E
- Country: Italy
- Region: Lombardy
- Province: Lodi (LO)
- Frazioni: Cascina Belfiorito e Belfuggito, Domodossola, Galeotta, Pedrinetta, Ranera

Government
  - Mayor: Maurizio Ettore Enrico Villa

Area
  - Total: 20.0 km^{2} (7.7 sq mi)
- Elevation: 73 m (240 ft)

Population (30 September 2015)
  - Total: 13,202
  - Density: 660/km^{2} (1,710/sq mi)
- Demonym: Santangiolini or Barasini
- Time zone: UTC+1 (CET)
  - Summer (DST): UTC+2 (CEST)
- Postal code: 26866
- Dialing code: 0371
- Patron saint: St. Anthony Abbot and S.ta Francesca Saverio Cabrini
- Saint day: 17 January and 15 July
- Website: Official website

Sant'Angelo Lodigiano (locally Sant'Angel) is a comune (municipality) in the Province of Lodi in the Italian region Lombardy, located about 30 kilometres (19 mi) southeast of Milan and about 12 kilometres (7 mi) southwest of Lodi.

== People ==
- Giovanni Battista Sommariva (1762–1826), lawyer, politician, and art collector
- Saint Francesca Cabrini (1850–1917), Catholic teacher and missionary
- Mario Beccaria (1920–2003), mayor from 1960 to 1964, politician of Christian Democracy, and member of the Italian Chamber of Deputies from 1968 to 1976
- Danilo Gallinari (born 1988), NBA player
- Alessandro Matri (born 1984), football player
- Sandro Tonali (born 2000), football player
