= Lodi Vecchio =

Lodi Vecchio Lod Vég (Lombard)
- Comune
- Città di Lodi Vecchio
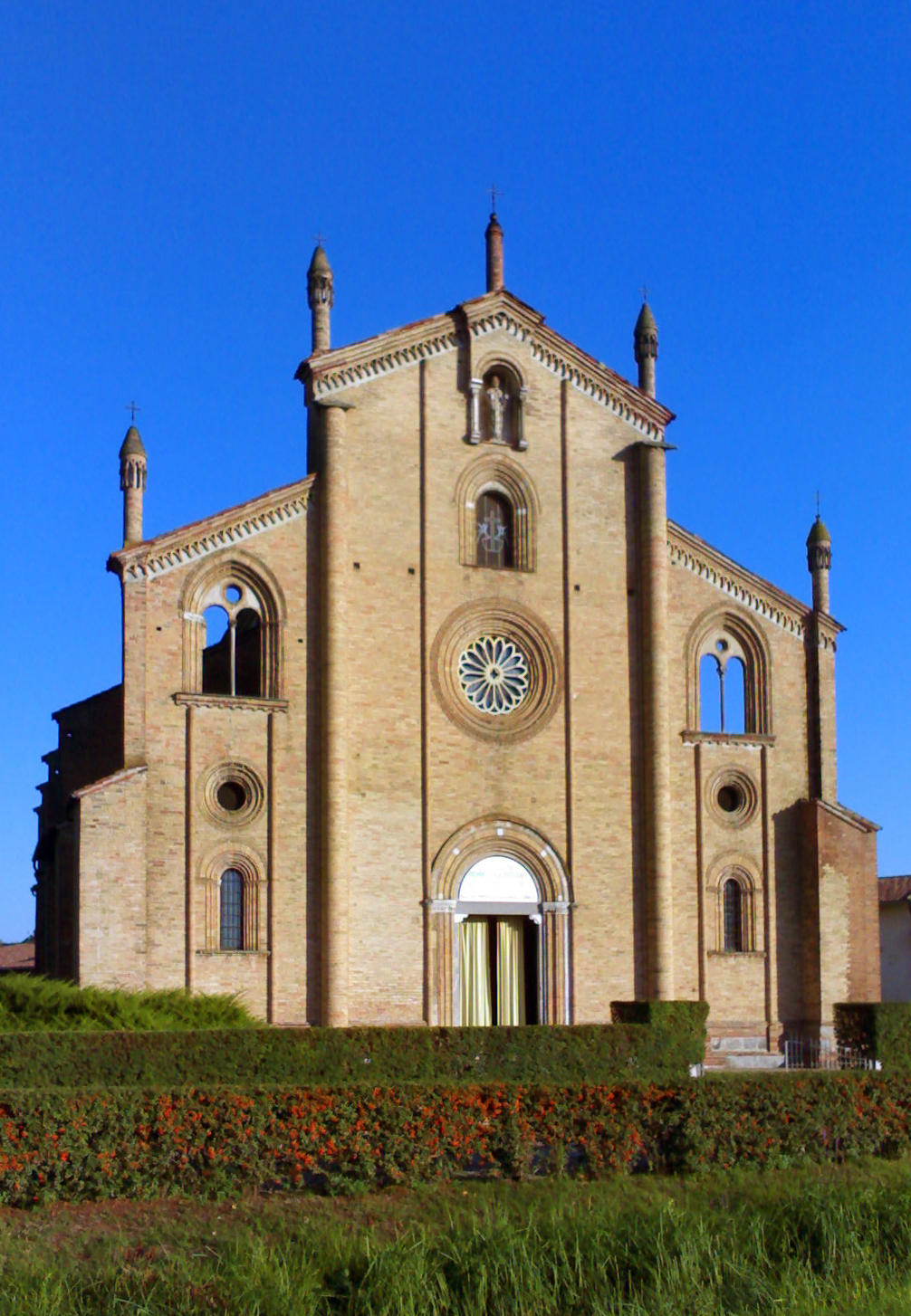
- Church of San Bassiano.

- Flag Coat of arms

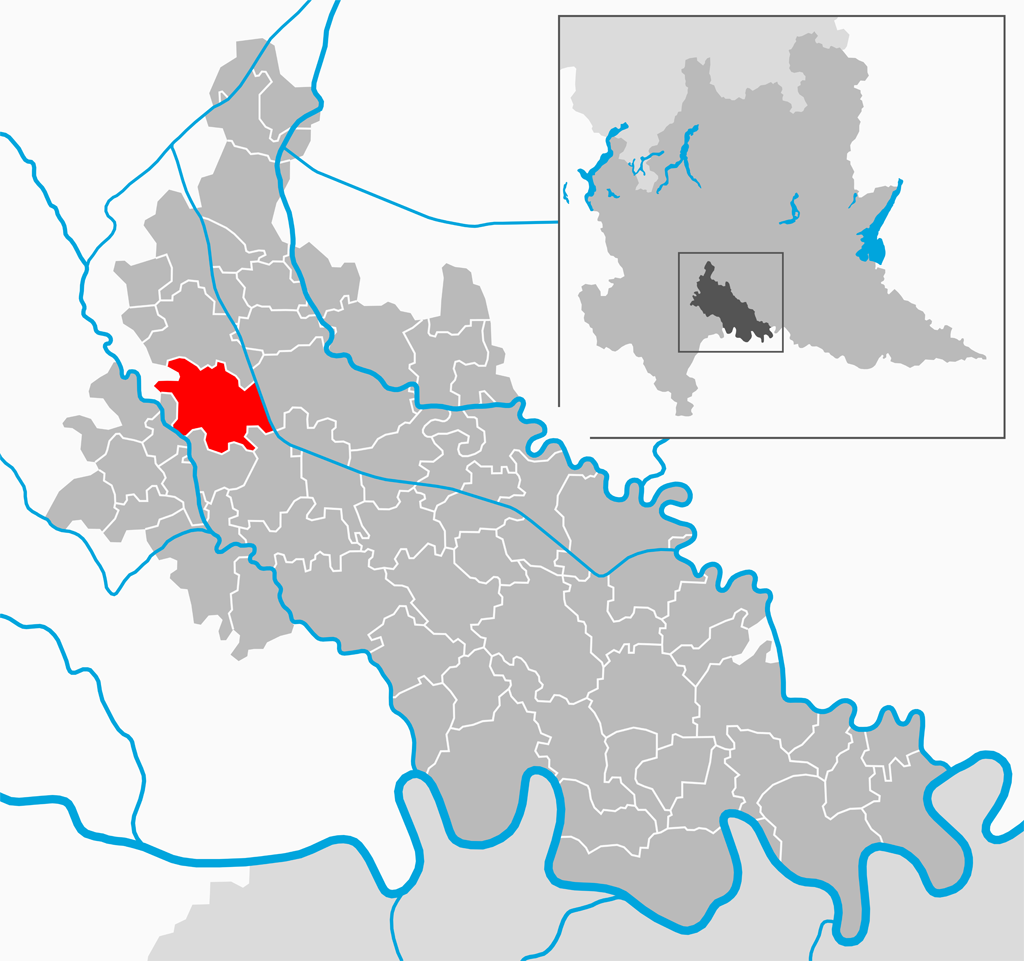

- Location within Italy Location within Lombardy
- Coordinates: 45°18′N 9°24′E
- Country: Italy
- Region: Lombardy
- Province: Lodi (LO)

Government
  - Mayor: Lino Osvaldo Felissari

Area
  - Total: 16.0 km^{2} (6.2 sq mi)
- Elevation: 82 m (269 ft)

Population (31 November 2016)
  - Total: 7,533
  - Density: 471/km^{2} (1,220/sq mi)
- Demonym: Ludevegini
- Time zone: UTC+1 (CET)
  - Summer (DST): UTC+2 (CEST)
- Postal code: 26855
- Dialing code: 0371
- Website: Official website

Lodi Vecchio (Ludesan: Lod Vég) is a comune (municipality) in the Province of Lodi in the Italian region Lombardy, which is located about 25 kilometres (16 mi) southeast of Milan and about 8 kilometres (5 mi) west of Lodi. It received the honorary title of city with a presidential decree on January 22, 2006.

== History ==
As testified by its name (meaning "Old Lodi" in Italian), it occupies the site of the ancient Lodi, which originated as a Celtic/Roman town on the Via Aemilia, known as Laus Pompeia. In the mid-4th century it became a bishopric seat.

In the 11th century it fought successfully against the more powerful Milan, until the latter's troops besieged and destroyed it in 1111. In 1158 the town was rebuilt by emperor Frederick I Barbarossa a few kilometers afar, originating the modern Lodi.

== People ==
- John of Lodi
