= Province of Lodi =

Province of Italy, located in the Lombardy region

Coordinates: 45°19′N 9°30′E

Province of Lodi Provincia di Lodi (Italian) Pruincia de Lod (Western Lombard)
- Province
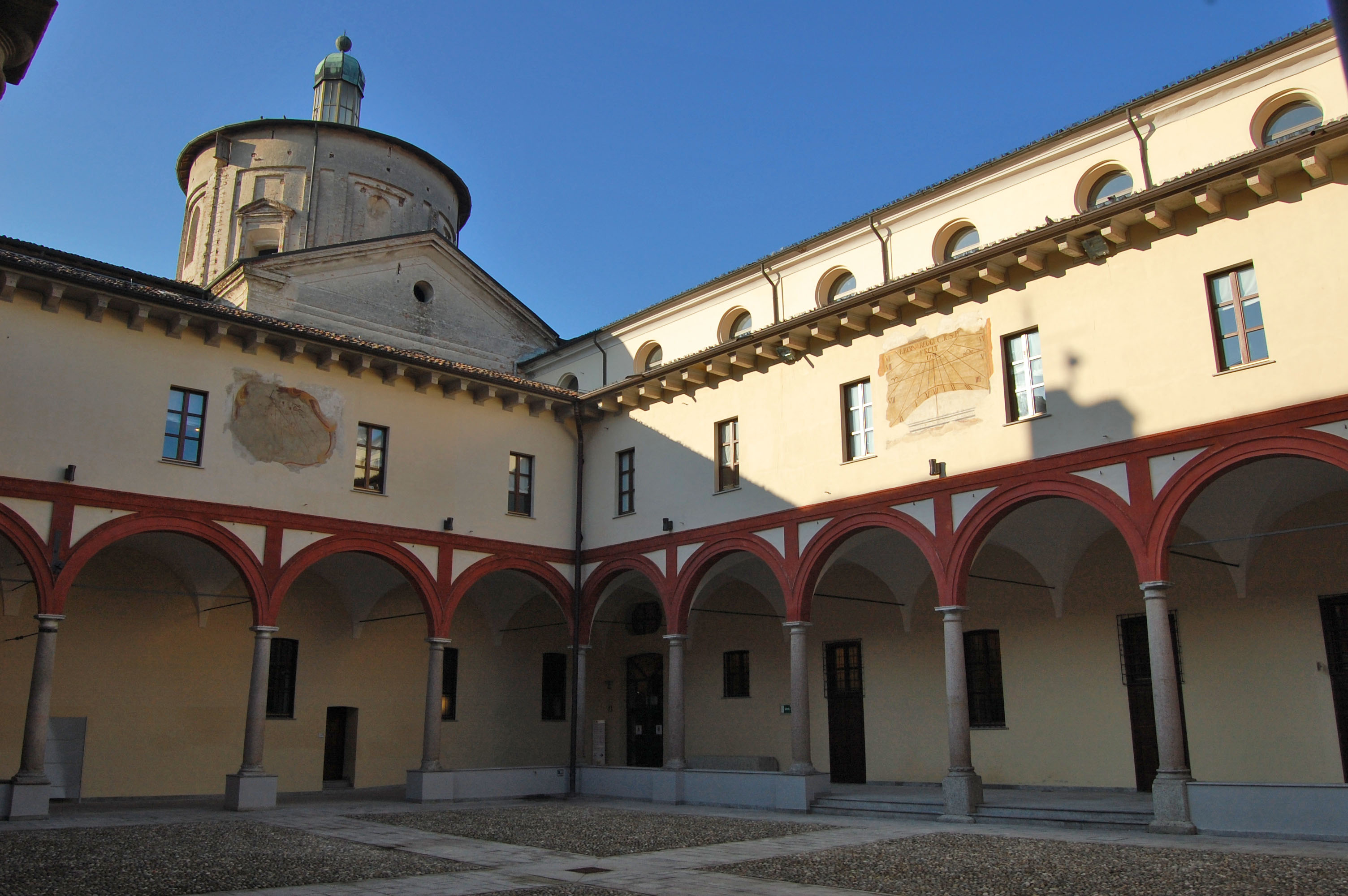
- Palazzo San Cristoforo, the seat of the province

- Flag Coat of arms

- Location of the province of Lodi in Italy
- Country: Italy
- Region: Lombardy
- Established: 6 March 1992
- Capital(s): Lodi
- Municipalities: 60

Government
  - President: Fabrizio Santantonio

Area
  - Total: 782.99 km^{2} (302.31 sq mi)

Population (2026)
  - Total: 231,481
  - Density: 295.64/km^{2} (765.70/sq mi)

GDP
  - Total: €5.679 billion (2015)
  - Per capita: €24,746 (2015)
- Time zone: UTC+1 (CET)
  - Summer (DST): UTC+2 (CEST)
- Postal code: 26900
- Telephone prefix: 0371
- Vehicle registration: LO
- ISTAT code: 098

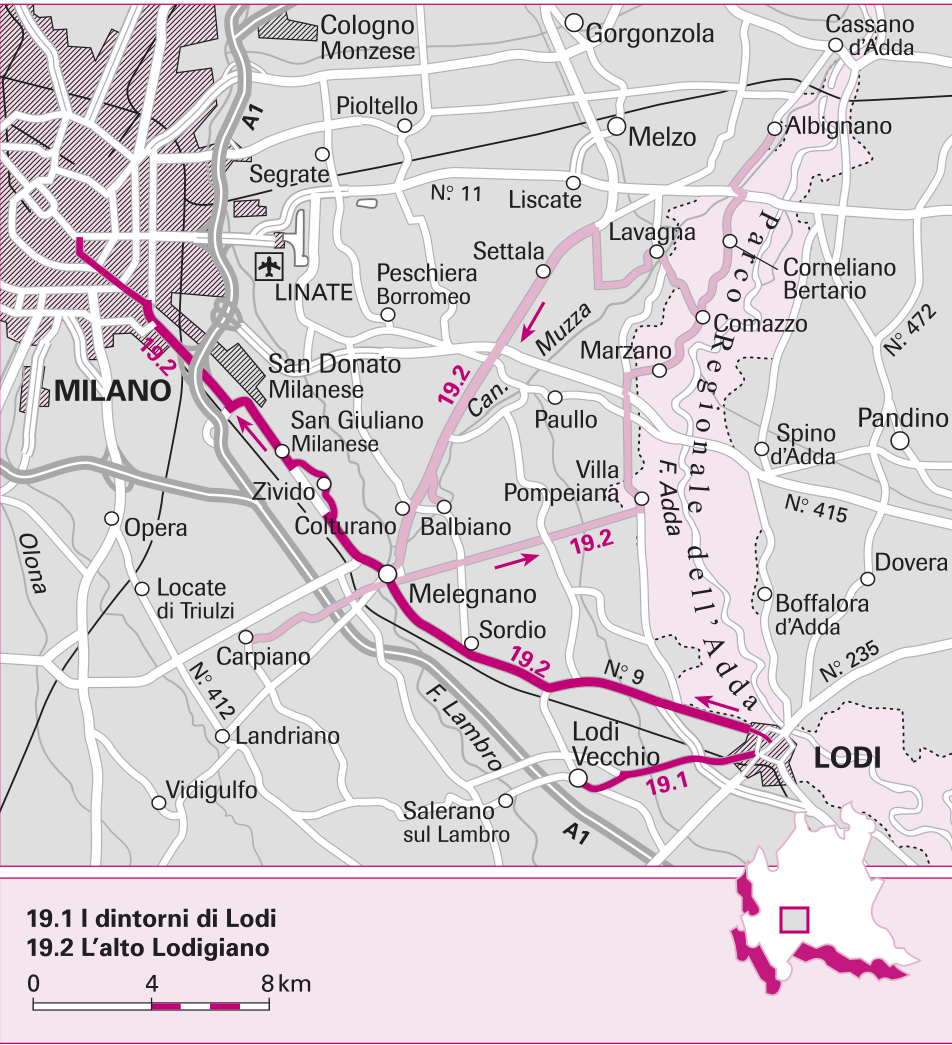
The surroundings of Lodi and the upper province

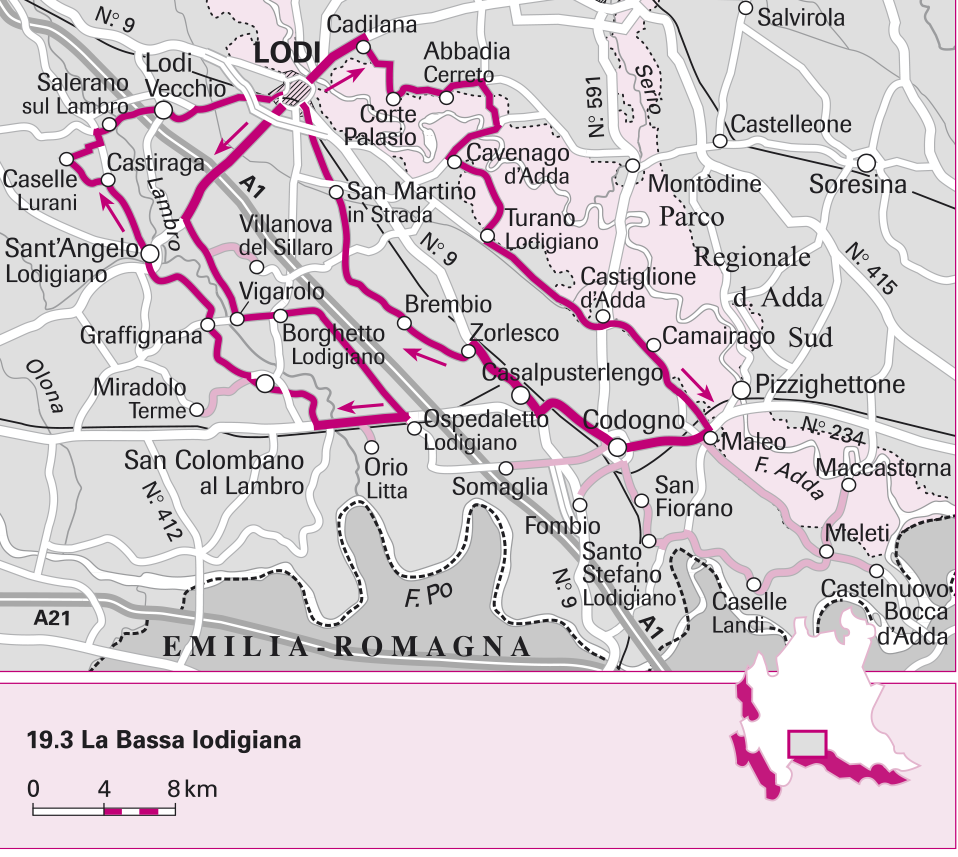
The lower province

The province of Lodi (Italian: provincia di Lodi; Ludesan: pruincia de Lod) is a province in the region of Lombardy in Italy. Its capital is the city of Lodi.

It has a population of 231,481 in an area of 782.99 square kilometres (302.31 sq mi) across its 60 municipalities.

The provincial president is Fabrizio Santantonio.

== History ==
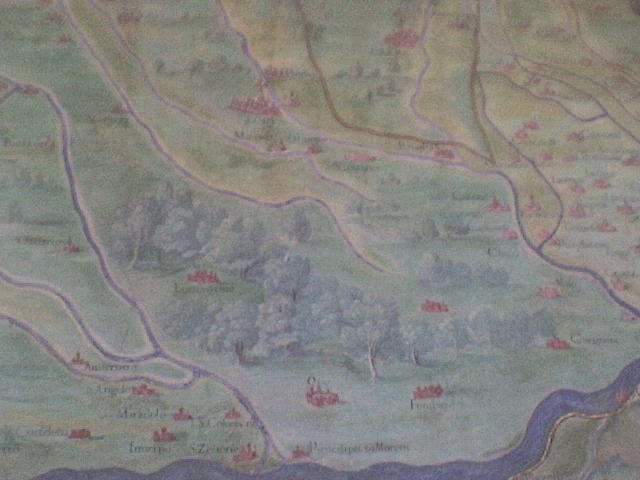
The province of Lodi in the Middle Ages

The city of Lodi was first settled during the fifth century BC by Celtic tribes, before being occupied by the Romans in 222 BC; by 89 BC it was called Laus Pompeia, the central city of the Lodi Vecchio. The history of the province in the Lombard and Frankish period is poorly documented, but the city of Lodi controlled the important trading route from Milan southwards to Cremona, Piacenza and the lower stretches of the River Lambro.

In 1025, the German emperor, Conrad II, granted certain rights to the Archbishop of Milan which caused land ownership to change and tensions in the region to flare. Allied with the Holy Roman Emperor but independent, Laus Pomperia fought against the Milanesi in the twelfth century, and the city was destroyed in 1111 and again in 1158, which marked the end of the city on the old location. A request made of Frederick I, Holy Roman Emperor, to rebuild the city near the Adda River was granted. The city, however, joined his opponents, the Lombard League, in 1167. Its citizens fought against Frederick at the Battle of Legnano in 1176. Still, it continued to have problems with Milan (also a member of the Lombard League) until the city was conquered in 1335 by lord of Milan Azzone Visconti.

It remained peaceful until it was invaded in the 1490s. The first significant Italian victory by Napoleon took place in the province on 10 May 1796, where the 5,000 men-strong forces of Napoleon defeated Austrian forces of 10,000 men. It fell under Austrian rule until the Austrians left the city in 1859 and it was ruled by the French forces, led by Marshal Patrice de MacMahon, Duke of Magenta, from 10 June 1859. It later became a part of the Kingdom of Italy and became a component of the province of Milan.

== Geography ==
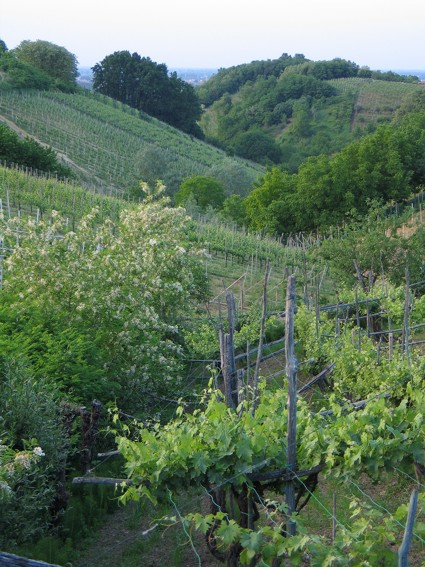
Hills around San Colombano al Lambro

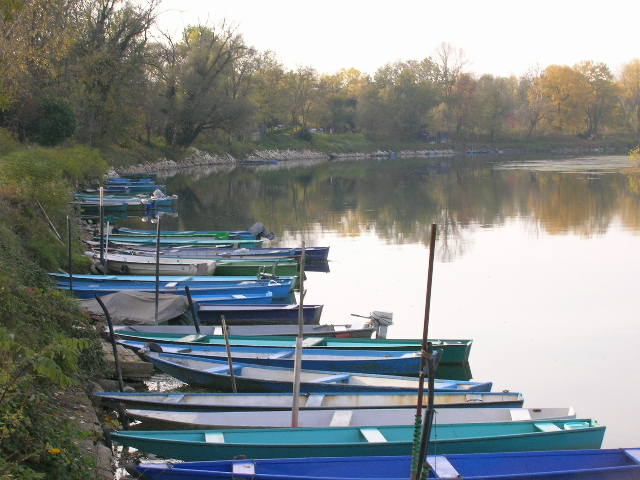
Adda river near Lodi

The province of Lodi is one of twelve provinces in the region of Lombardy in northwestern Italy. It is about 780 square kilometres (300 mi^{2}) in area and is delineated by rivers; the right bank of the Adda nearly surrounds it, and a further part of the boundary is formed by the left bank of the Lambro and of the Po. The province is bounded on the east by the Province of Cremona, the Metropolitan City of Milan to the north and by the Province of Pavia to the west. The land is mostly gently sloping or flat and the soil is alluvial loam. It is used to grow fodder crops, which are mown up to eight times a year, rice, wheat, maize, sugarbeet and vegetables.

== Government ==
=== Municipalities ===
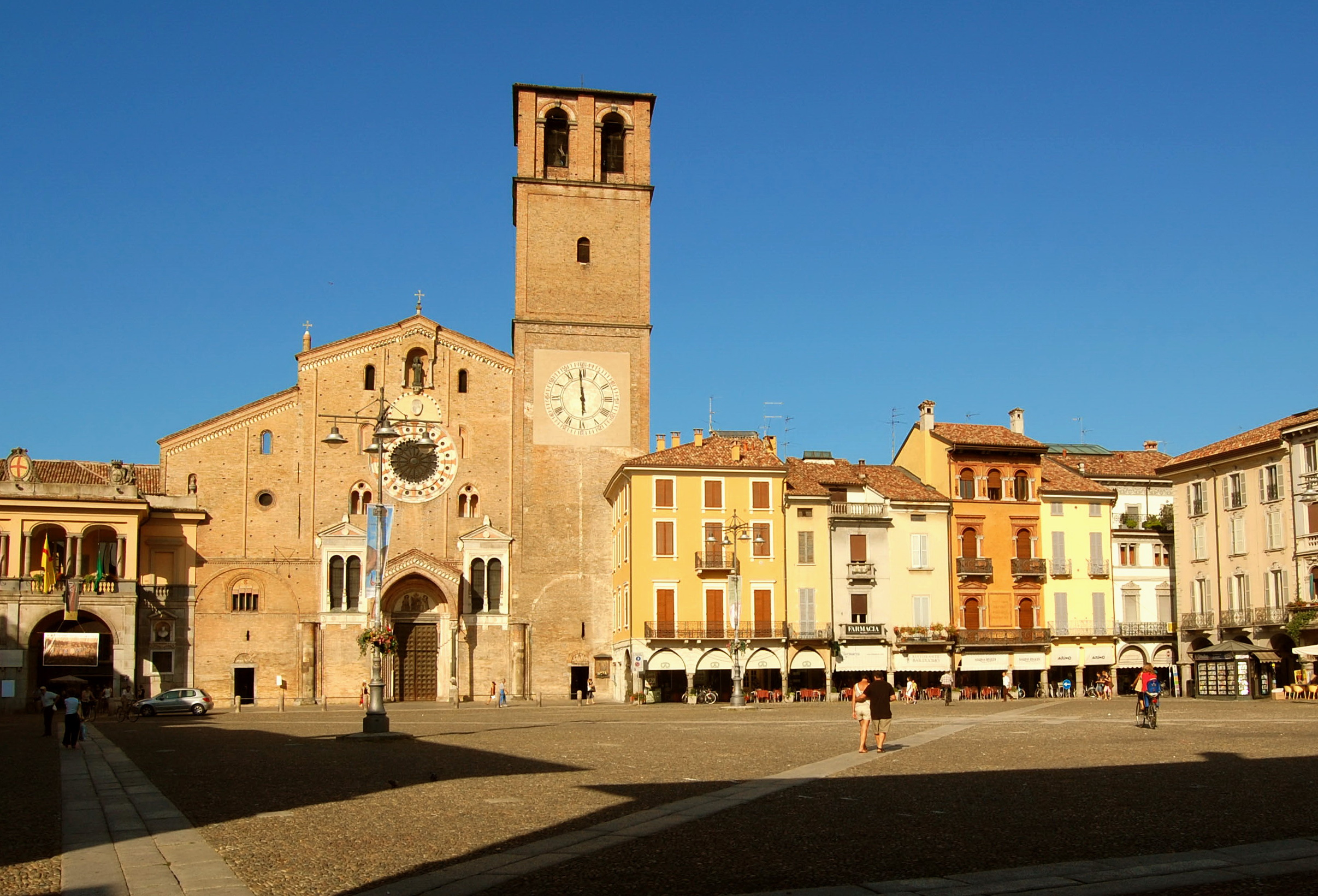
Lodi

The province has 60 municipalities:

- Abbadia Cerreto
- Bertonico
- Boffalora d'Adda
- Borghetto Lodigiano
- Borgo San Giovanni
- Brembio
- Casaletto Lodigiano
- Casalmaiocco
- Casalpusterlengo
- Caselle Landi
- Caselle Lurani
- Castelgerundo
- Castelnuovo Bocca d'Adda
- Castiglione d'Adda
- Castiraga Vidardo
- Cavenago d'Adda
- Cervignano d'Adda
- Codogno
- Comazzo
- Cornegliano Laudense
- Corno Giovine
- Cornovecchio
- Corte Palasio
- Crespiatica
- Fombio
- Galgagnano
- Graffignana
- Guardamiglio
- Livraga
- Lodi
- Lodi Vecchio
- Maccastorna
- Mairago
- Maleo
- Marudo
- Massalengo
- Meleti
- Merlino
- Montanaso Lombardo
- Mulazzano
- Orio Litta
- Ospedaletto Lodigiano
- Ossago Lodigiano
- Pieve Fissiraga
- Salerano sul Lambro
- San Fiorano
- San Martino in Strada
- San Rocco al Porto
- Sant'Angelo Lodigiano
- Santo Stefano Lodigiano
- Secugnago
- Senna Lodigiana
- Somaglia
- Sordio
- Tavazzano con Villavesco
- Terranova dei Passerini
- Turano Lodigiano
- Valera Fratta
- Villanova del Sillaro
- Zelo Buon Persico

== Demographics ==
As of 2026, the population is 231,481, of which 50.0% are male, and 50.0% are female. Minors make up 15.4% of the population, and seniors make up 23.4%.

Historical population

Year	Pop.	±%
1861	159,025	—
1871	163,469	+2.8%
1881	163,605	+0.1%
1901	167,415	+2.3%
1911	165,570	−1.1%
1921	168,667	+1.9%
1931	167,420	−0.7%
1936	166,497	−0.6%

Year	Pop.	±%
1951	180,436	+8.4%
1961	172,912	−4.2%
1971	175,844	+1.7%
1981	179,102	+1.9%
1991	184,025	+2.7%
2001	197,672	+7.4%
2011	223,755	+13.2%
2021	227,327	+1.6%

Source: ISTAT

=== Immigration ===
As of 2025, immigrants make up 15.1% of the population. The 5 largest foreign countries of birth are Romania, Egypt, Albania, Morocco, and India.

== Transport ==
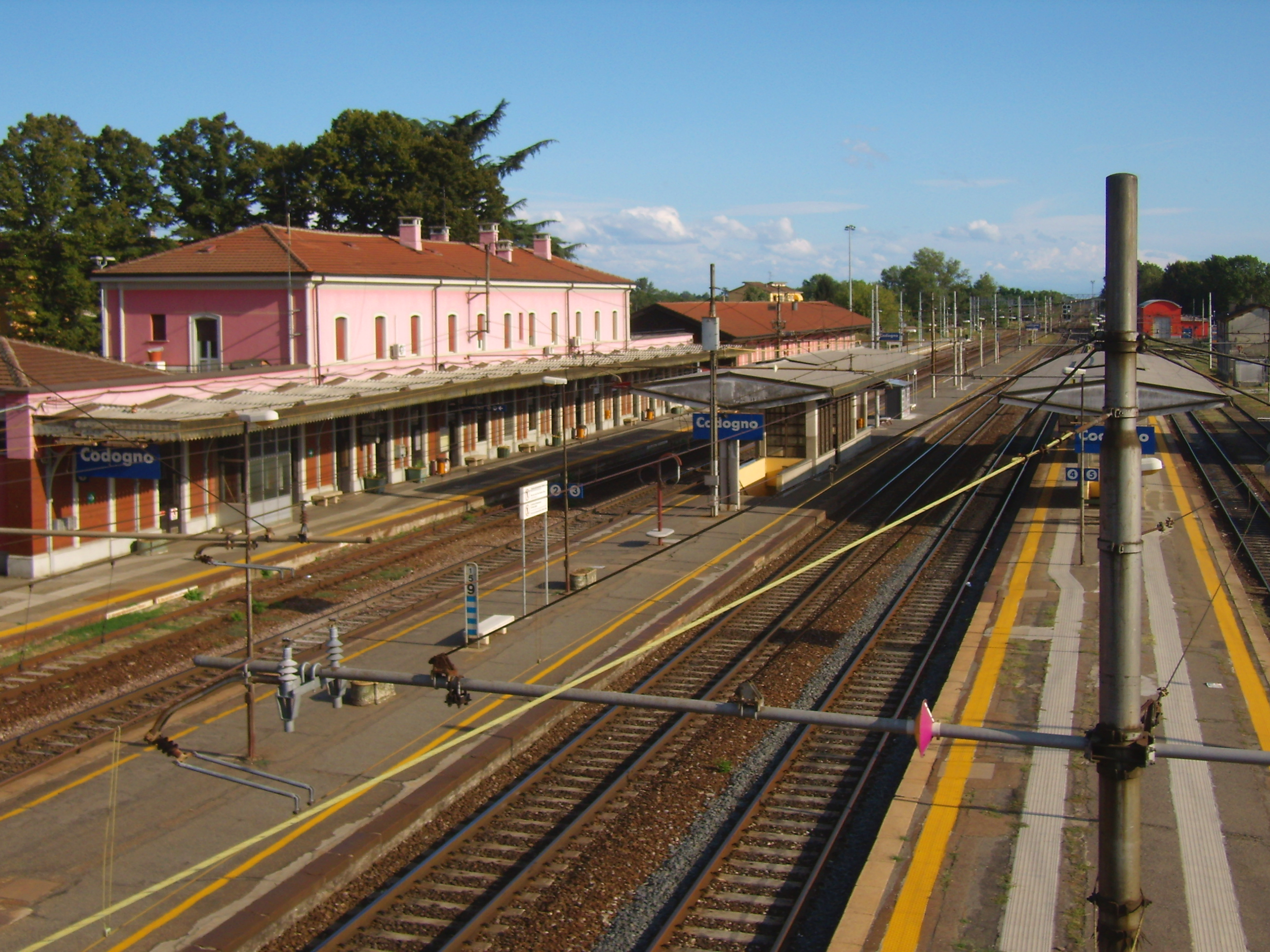
Codogno railway station

=== Motorways ===
- Autostrada A1: Milan-Naples
- Autostrada A58: Milan external east ring road

=== Railway lines ===
- Milan–Bologna high-speed railway
- Milan–Bologna railway
