= Trecchi Castle (Maleo) =

Coordinates: 45°10′0″N 9°46′0″E

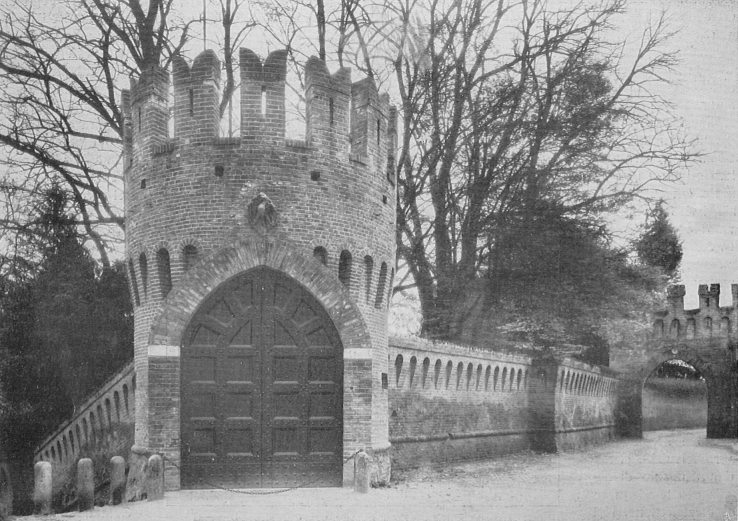
Trecchi Castle

Trecchi Castle is a 15th-century fortress located in Maleo, Province of Lodi, Lombardy, Italy.

The construction of the building is attributed to architect Pellegrino Tibaldi. The castle was transformed into a country villa over time.

== History ==
- 1532-1560: construction with moat and flanking towers.
- 1567: Bernardino Campi designed the painted decoration of the vault of the octagonal chapel of the hall of Olympus, the Apollo chamber, and the hall of Poseidon.
- 1645: The castle became the property of the Marquis of Giovan Battista Trecchi, and remained in the possession of the family of Cremona until the 1970s, when it was sold.
