= Fombio =

Fombio Fùmbi (Lombard)
- Comune
- Comune di Fombio
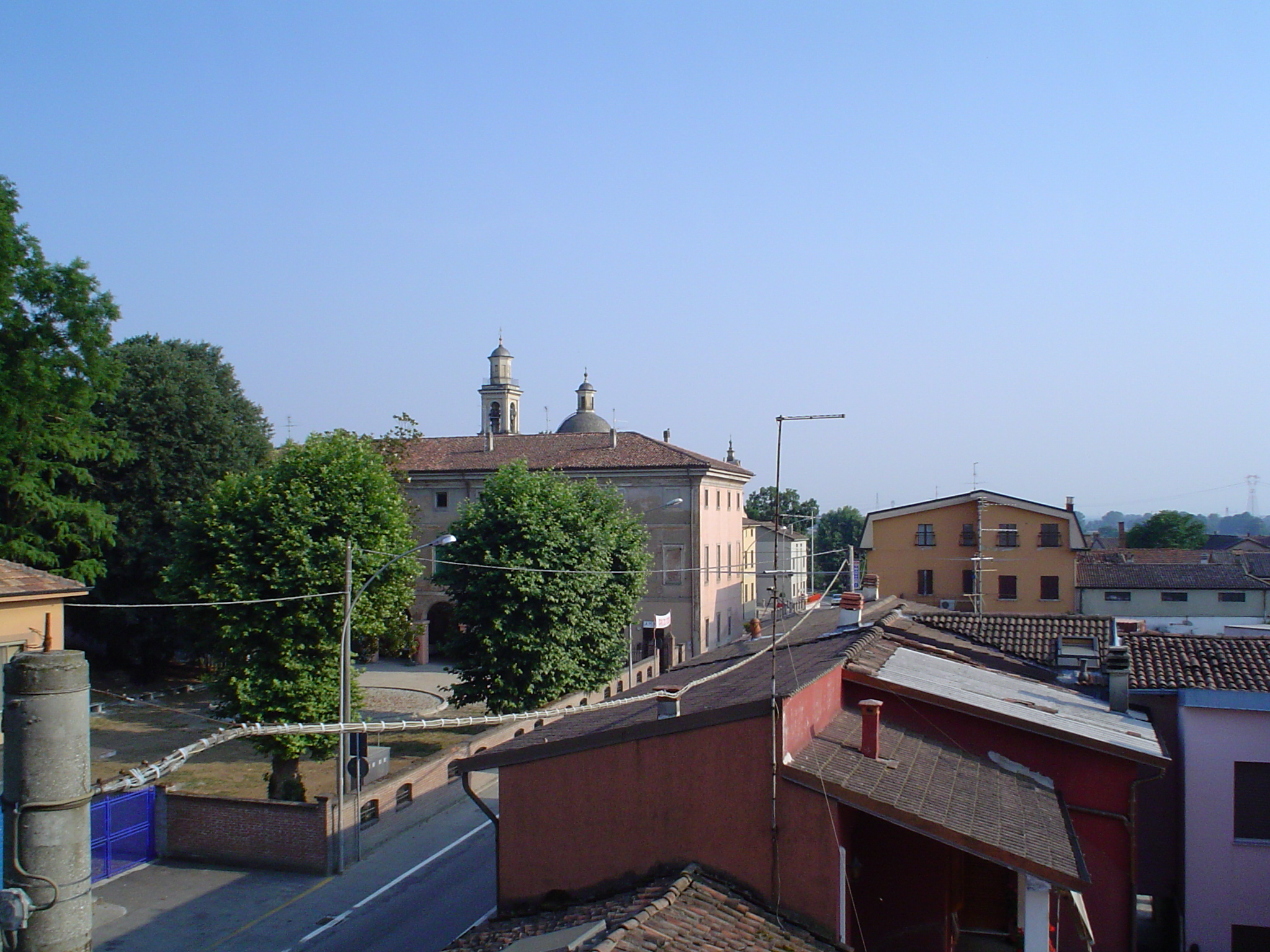

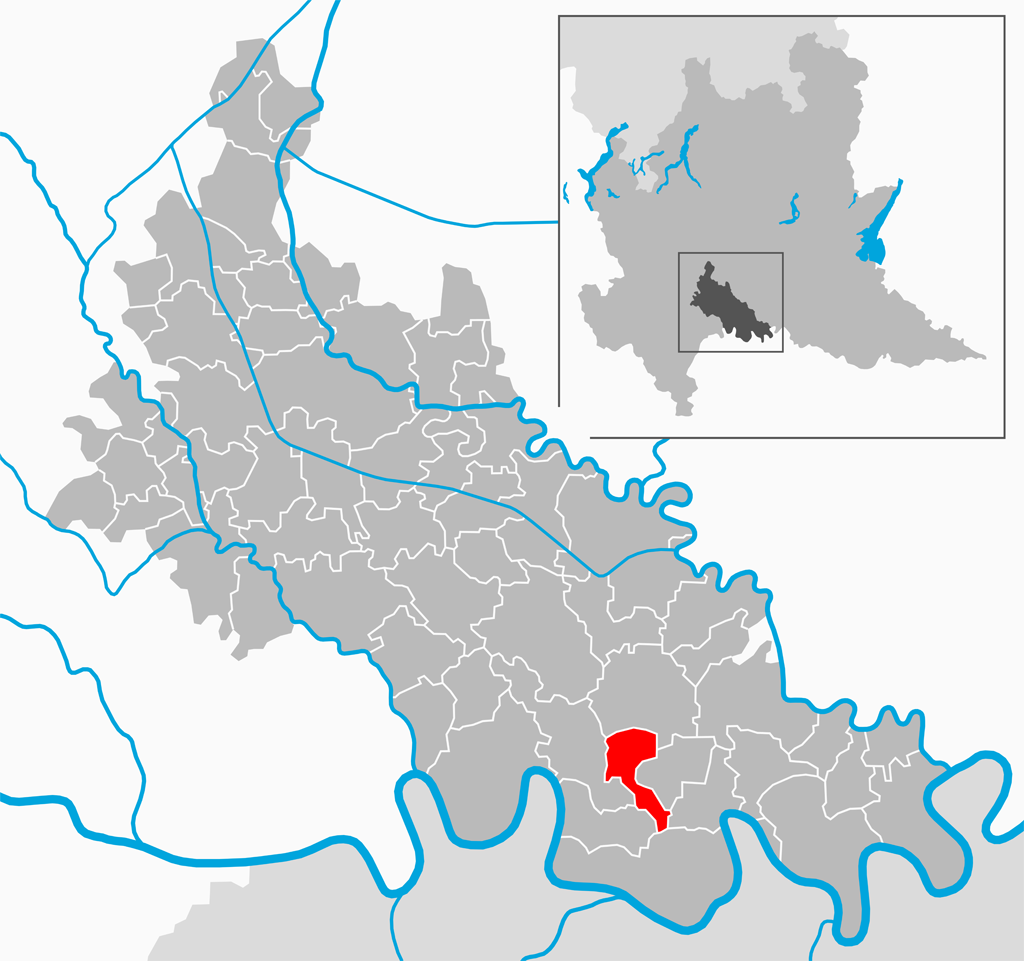

- Location within Italy Location within Lombardy
- Coordinates: 45°9′N 9°42′E
- Country: Italy
- Region: Lombardy
- Province: Lodi (LO)
- Frazioni: Retegno

Government
  - Mayor: Franco Stefanoni

Area
  - Total: 7.4 km^{2} (2.9 sq mi)
- Elevation: 56 m (184 ft)

Population (31 August 2017)
  - Total: 2,342
  - Density: 320/km^{2} (820/sq mi)
- Demonym: Fombiesi
- Time zone: UTC+1 (CET)
  - Summer (DST): UTC+2 (CEST)
- Postal code: 26861
- Dialing code: 0377
- Website: Official website

Fombio (Lodigiano: Fùmbi) is a comune (municipality) in the Province of Lodi in the Italian region Lombardy, located about 50 kilometres (31 mi) southeast of Milan and about 25 kilometres (16 mi) southeast of Lodi.

It was the site of the Battle of Fombio in 1796.

Fombio borders the following municipalities: Codogno, Somaglia, San Fiorano, Santo Stefano Lodigiano, Guardamiglio, San Rocco al Porto.

== See also ==
- Retegno
