= Pino Pagani =

Italian radio host and journalist (1937–2023)

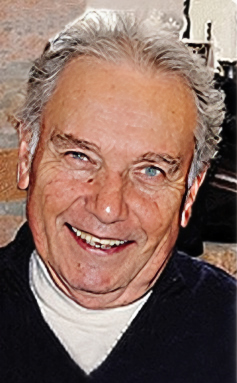
- Born: Giuseppe Pagani; 31 March 1937; Codogno, Italy
- Died: 8 December 2023 (aged 86); Codogno, Italy
- Occupations: Radio host, author, and journalist
- Partner: Santa Tronconi (d. 2014)
- Children: Samuel, Alessandro
- Awards: Tirinnanzi Prize, Legnano; Antica credenza di Sant'Ambrogio Prize, Milan

Pino Pagani (31 March 1937 – 8 December 2023) was an Italian radio host and journalist. As a radio host, he was most well known for hosting the Radio Codogno program Radio Zona Rossa (Red Zone Radio) in 2020, at the time of COVID-19, to keep residents informed and provide them with ongoing support. He is also known as a dialect poet.

== Early life ==
He was born in 1937 in Codogno, in Fratelli Cairoli Square, in the “Medri Courtyard”. He worked at the Duco-Montecatini company in Avigliana. He later worked in the Felisi textile in Codogno, before occupying an administrative position at the civil hospital of Codogno.

== Career ==
He was also active in social, labor syndicates and sports circles. Notably, he served as a football judge with the Lodi branch of Associazione Italiana Arbitri, as president of an ACLI club, and as a regional representative for that organization. Furthermore, he represented the "Amici di Fratel Emanuel" association, which supports the San Biagio school in Statte (Puglia) and educational projects in Savoigne, located about 30 kilometres (19 mi) from Saint-Louis, Senegal.

Pino Pagani had a prominent role in the cultural life of the province of Lodi and wrote for several newspapers, including Corriere della Sera, Libertà, Il Cittadino, Giornale di Brescia, and Il Popolo Codognese.

He also worked as a broadcaster for RadioLodi, Telemontepenice, Telelibertà, and—most notably Radio Codogno.

He died of cancer in 2023;; and was buried in Monumental Cemetery of Codogno.

== Awards and honours ==
- Tirinnanzi Prize, Legnano, silver medal.
- Antica credenza di Sant'Ambrogio Prize, 17th ediction, 2014, Milan, for prose and in the same competition, section poetry, 2nd prize.

== Bibliography ==
- AA VV, Codogno: un paese, la sua storia, la sua anima, Milan, Telesio Editore
- Pino Pagani; Brevi di cronaca lunga cento anni - 1908 A.C. Codogno (associazione calcio) - Codogno. Un secolo di storia; Ed. MG Artigrafiche s.a.s.; Corno Giovine (LO); pp. 35 e 90; magg 2008
- Pino Pagani, Miòt e chisöl, as trèva via gnènt, Il Cittadino, 23 November 2011
- Pino Pagani; I bàgul dl donn in dla stala, Il Cittadino, 14 December 2011
- Pino Pagani; Melga catàda, batüda e mìsa nal granè, Il Cittadino, 29 August 2012
- Pino Pagani, El magnan, laurèri ‘d quèi antìch, Il Cittadino, 21 May 2014
- Pino Pagani and Chiara Rocca, Quella "Madre dei Poveri" chiamata Giulietta - novantanove appunti per una riflessione, dagli scritti della Venerabile Giulia di Barolo nata Colbert, Corno Giovine (LO), MG Artigrafiche s.a.s., 2016
- Pino Pagani, È mort Doru Riboldi, el re d'la raspadüra, Il Cittadino, 28 February 2018
- Pino Pagani, Riva al temp di pum cudògn e pum granìn, Il Cittadino, 12 October 2023

== Gallery ==
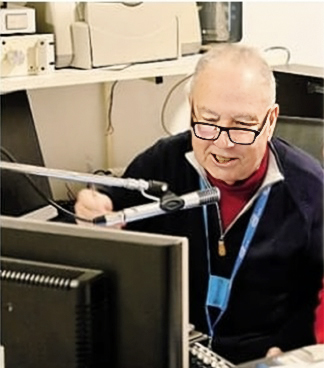
Pino Pagani during Radio Red Zone program, (2020).
