= Mario Vellani Marchi =

Italian painter (1895–1979)

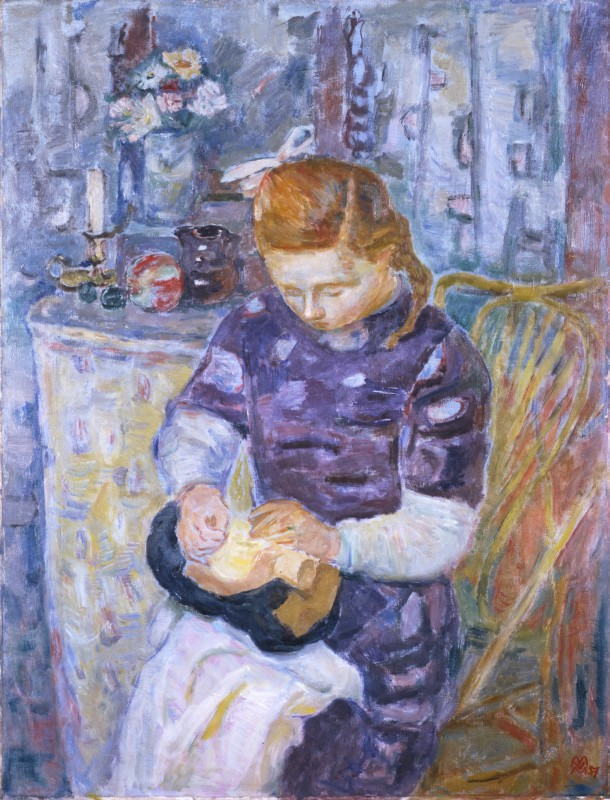
La Rossina merlettaia (Fondazione Cariplo)

Mario Vellani Marchi (1895–1979) was an Italian painter and scenic designer.

== Biography ==
Vellani Marchi was born in Modena. He attended the Modena Academy of Fine Arts in the early years of the second decade of the 20th century and specialised in engraving. He made his debut at the Venice Biennale with the 14th Esposizione Internazionale d'Arte of the city of Venice in 1924. He came into contact with the second generation of the Burano School through a stay on the island in the same year, and landscapes set there constitute a constant feature of his production.

After 1920, he spent some time in Burano painting landscapes, along with Giuseppe Novello, Francesco Arata, and Bernardino Palazzi. The newspaper Corriere della Sera sent him to Africa in 1934 with Orio Vergani. In scenic design, he painted sets for Il Campiello and I Quattro Rusteghi for the Scala theatre of Milan.

Having moved to Milan in 1925, he associated with the Novecento Italiano group and took part in their second show in 1929. It was in this period that his compositions attained greater structural definition. One of the founders of the Cenacolo di Via Bagutta, he also established his reputation as a painter in the 1930s. A solo show of his work was held in Milan at the Galleria Pesaro in 1932. He divided his time between Burano and Milan after World War II. He died in Milan in 1979.

== Other projects ==
Media related to Mario Vellani Marchi at Wikimedia Commons
