= Monumental Cemetery of Codogno =

Cemetery in Codogno, Italy

Cimitero Monumentale di Codogno Monumental Cemetery of Codogno
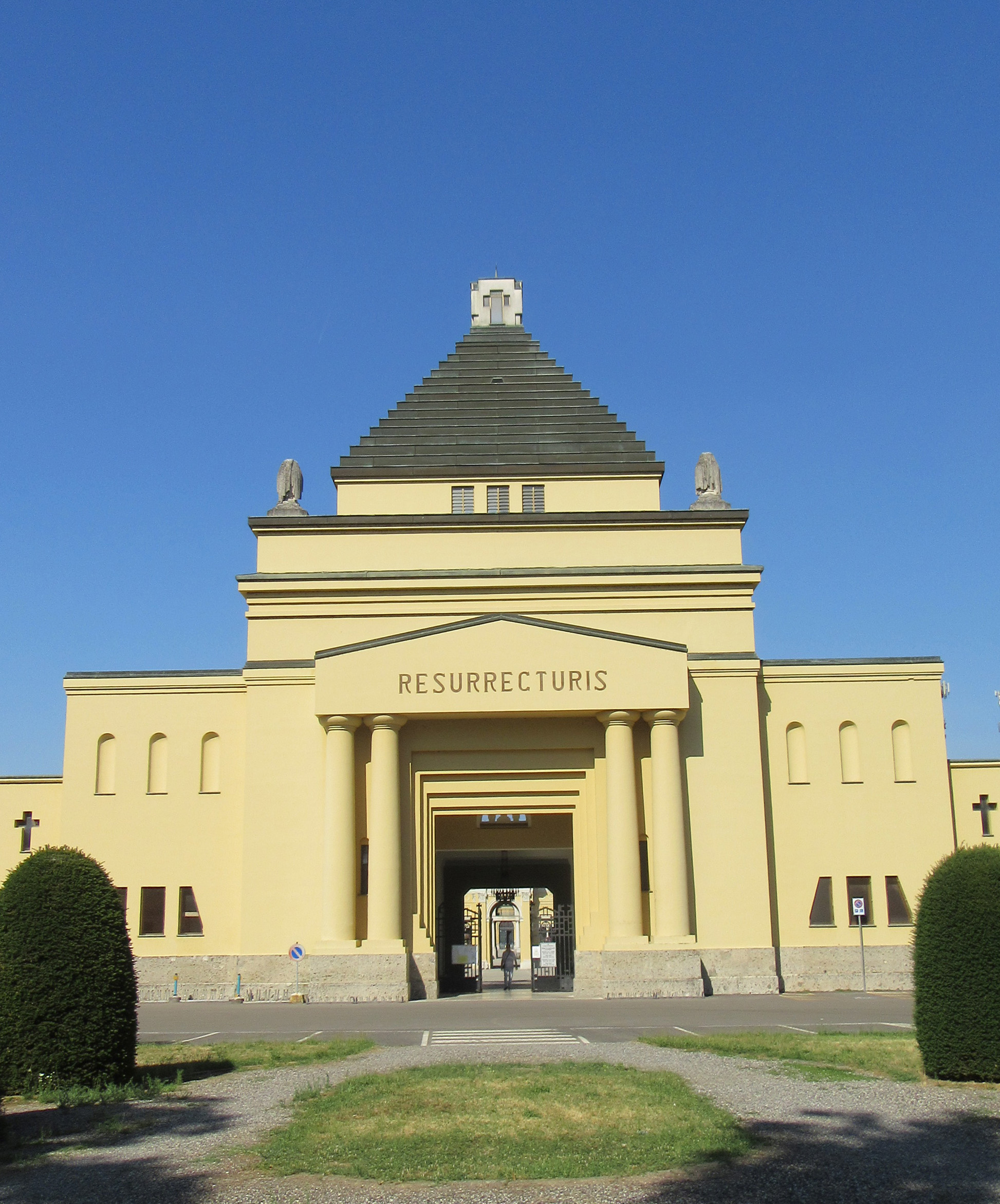
- The main entrance of the Monumental Cemetery of Codogno, Italy
- Interactive map of Cimitero Monumentale di Codogno; Monumental Cemetery of Codogno

Details
- Location: Codogno
- Country: Italy
- Coordinates: 45°09′36″N 9°42′18″E
- Type: Historic Roman Catholic
- Owned by: City of Codogno

The Monumental Cemetery of Codogno (Italian: Cimitero Monumentale di Codogno) is located in the city of Codogno, an Italian comune in the province of Lodi, in the region of Lombardy in northern Italy. It is located just outside the town center, between the church of Caravaggio and the municipal hospital.

== History ==
The cemetery has a rectangular layout and consists of three courtyards, the result of expansions following its original construction. On 2 June 2020 (Republic Day), the Italian president, Sergio Mattarella, visited the cemetery to pay tribute to the victims of the COVID-19 pandemic.

== Famous people buried ==
- Raimondo Pandini (1810–1889), politician, first mayor of Sant'Angelo Lodigiano after the proclamation of the Kingdom of Italy
- Arrigo Cairo, (1894-1959), first mayor of Codogno after the Liberation and member of the Constituent Assembly
- Giuseppe Novello, (1897-1988), painter
- Virgilio Muzzi, (1923-2010), comic book artist
- Pino Pagani, (1937-2023) freelance journalist and radio speaker

== Gallery ==
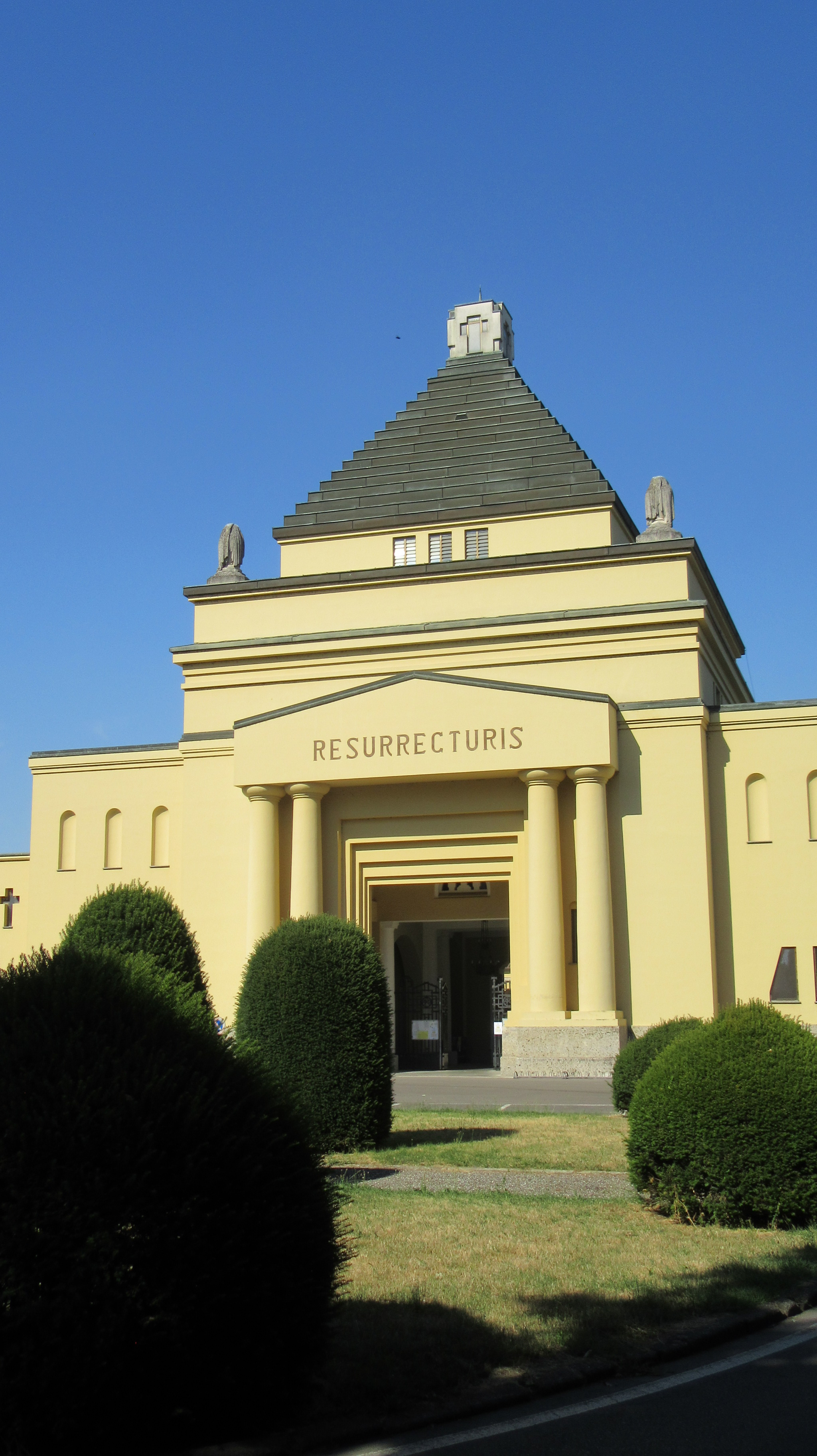
Other side of the entrance.

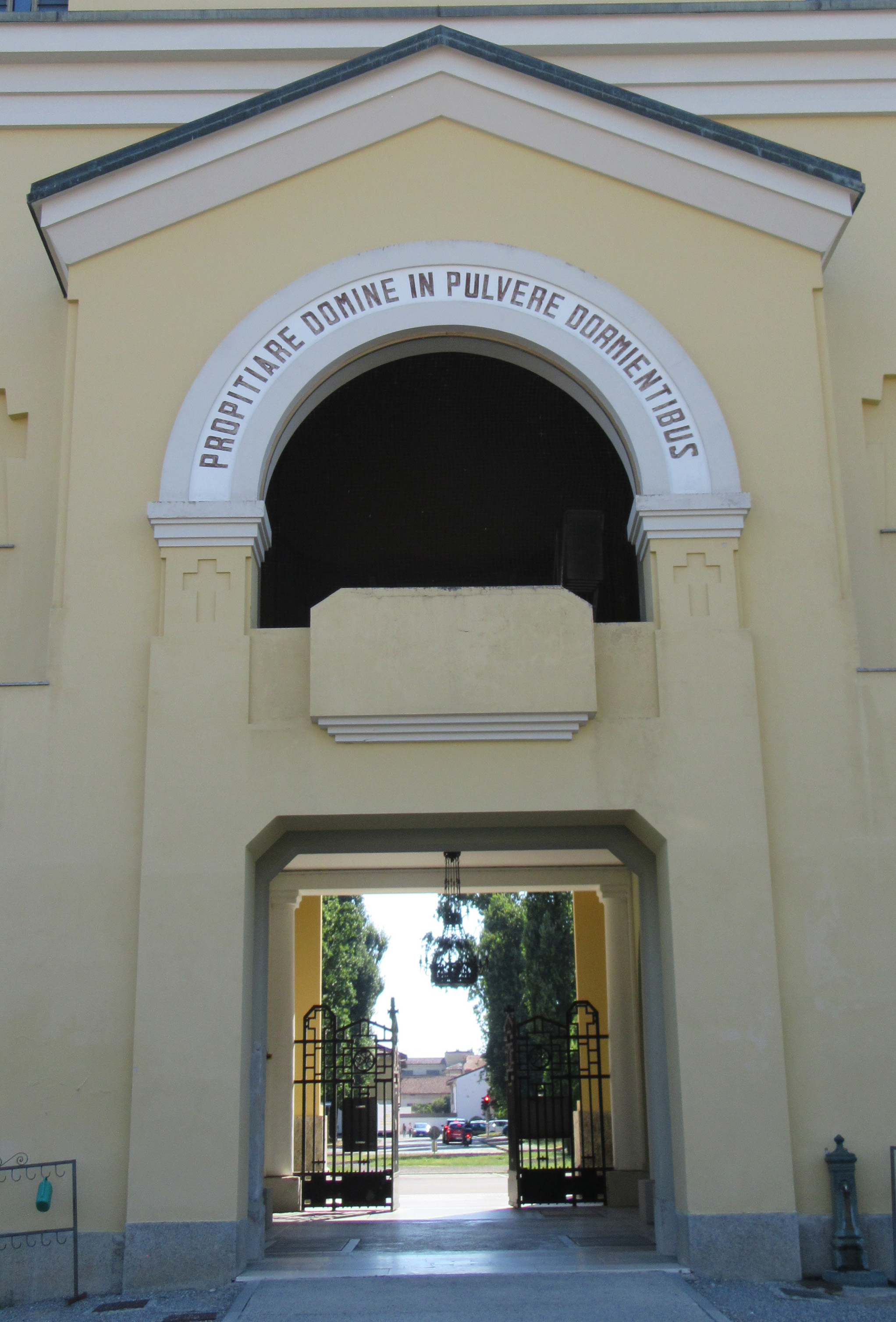
The back of the entrance, to the first courtyard.

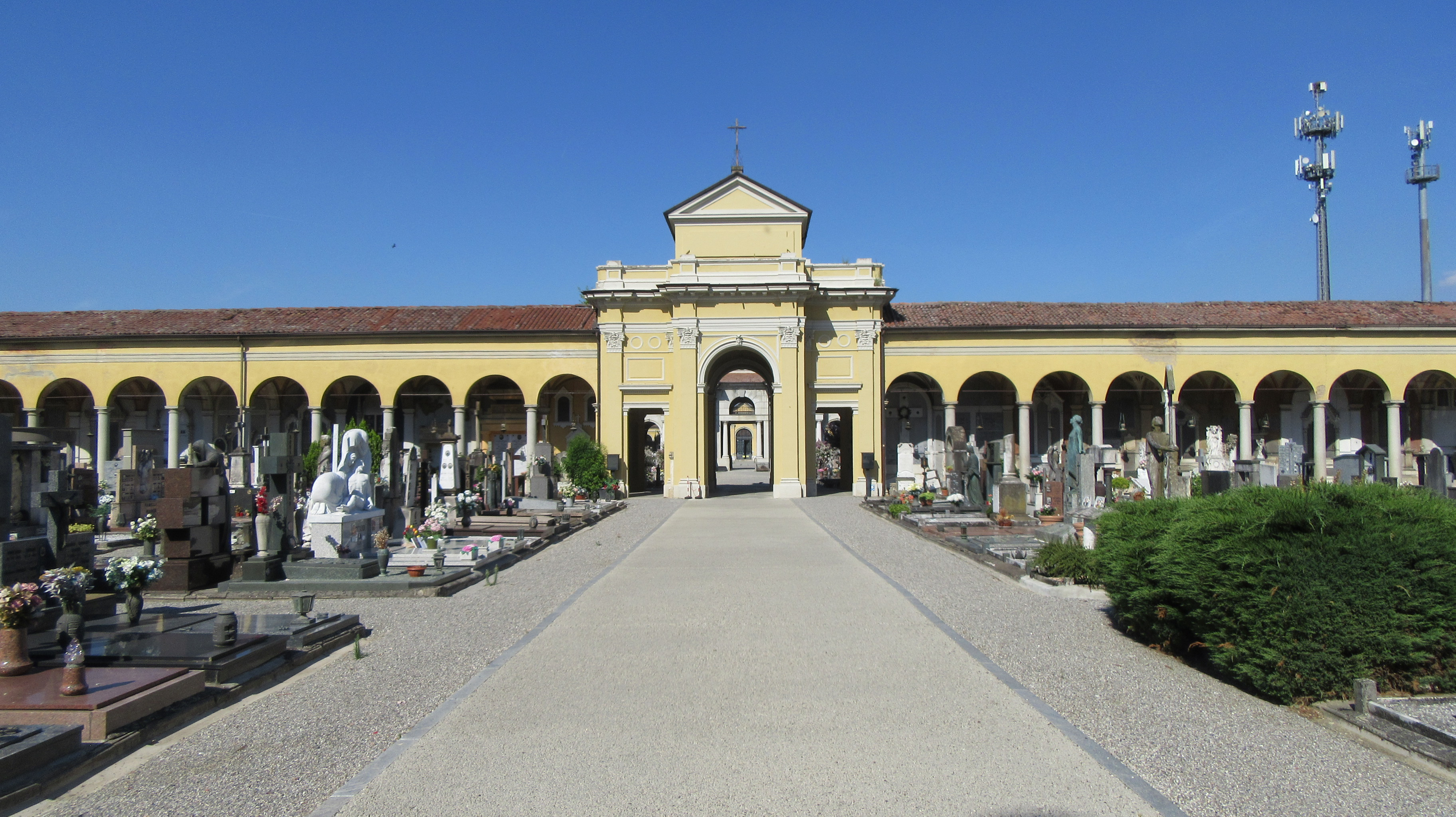
The first courtyard.

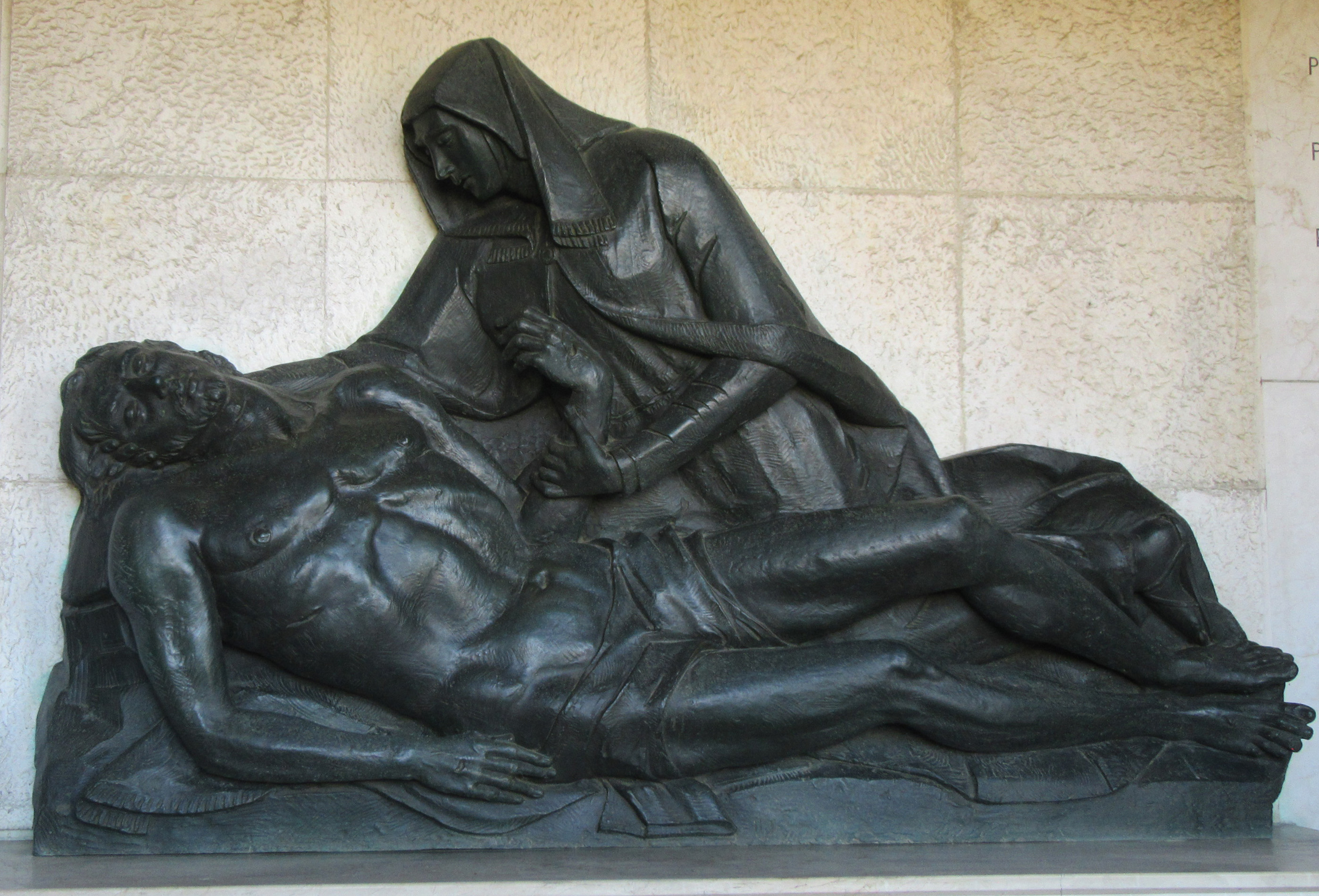
A Pietà under the entrance portico, on the left.

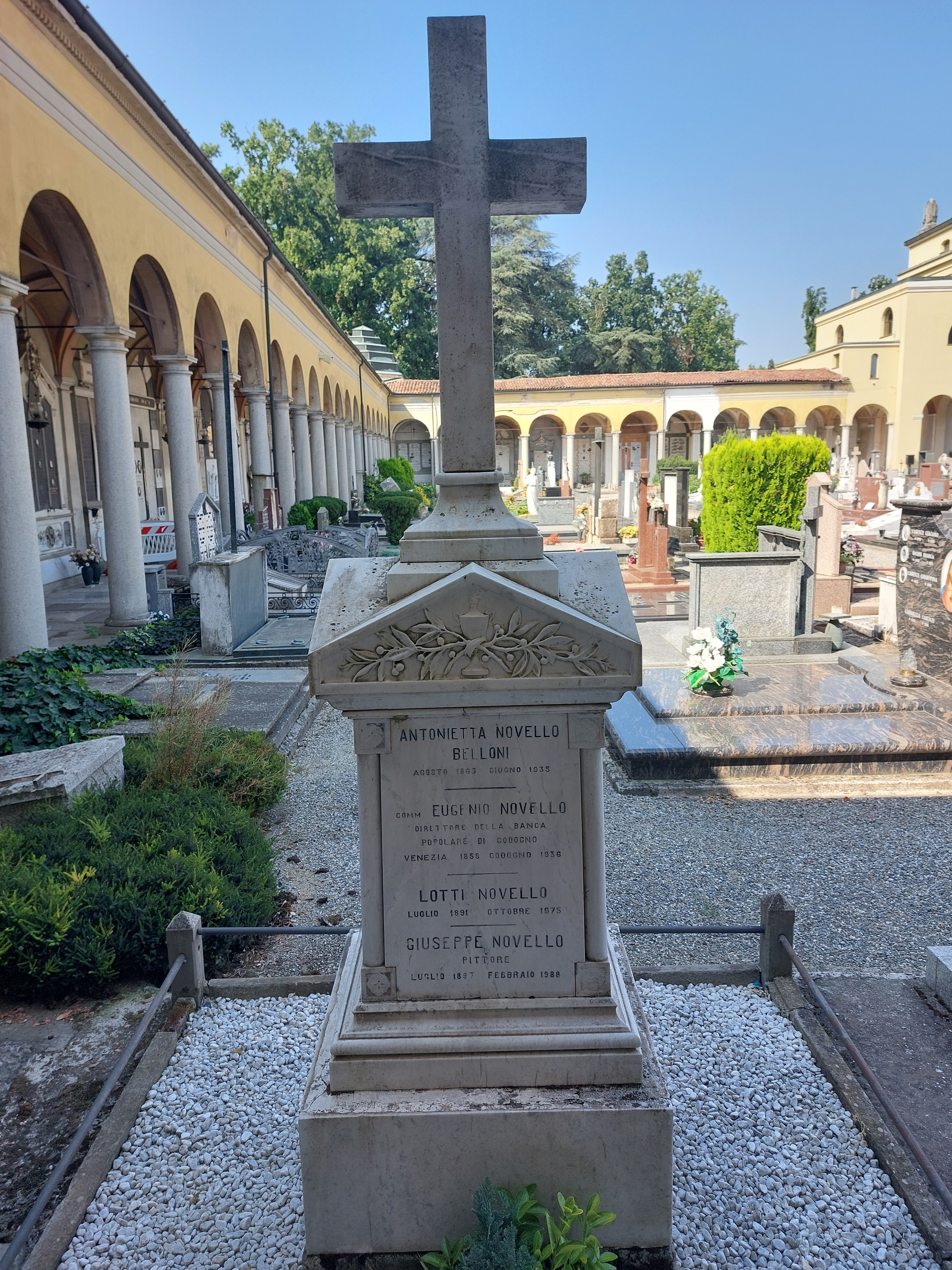
Painter Giuseppe Novello Grave

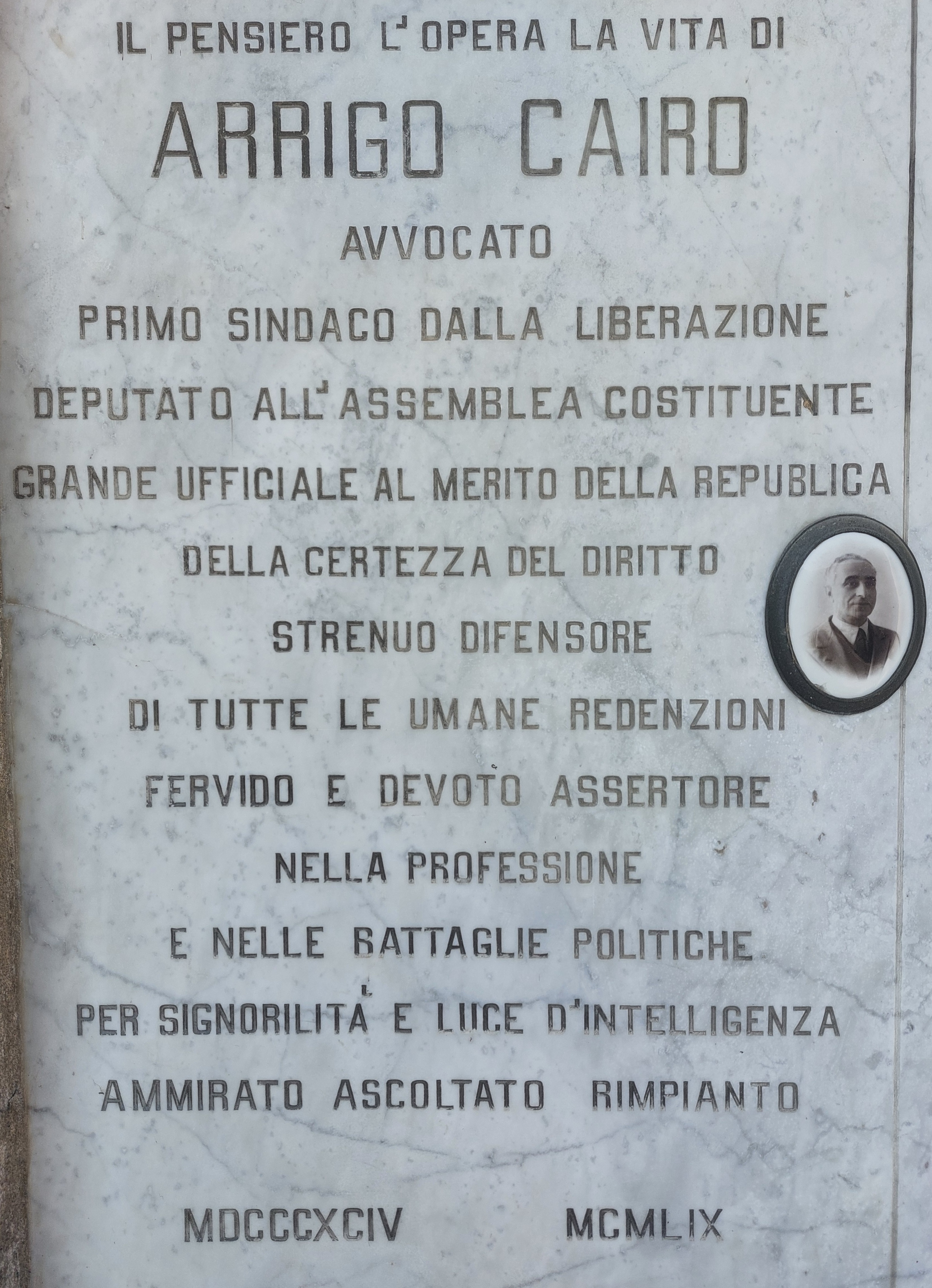
Arrigo Cairo grave

== See also ==
- Cemetery

== Bibliography ==
- Palazzina D., Cenni storici di Codogno, Milano 1964, pp. 234-235
