= San Fiorano =

San Fiorano San Fiuràn (Lombard)
- Comune
- Comune di San Fiorano
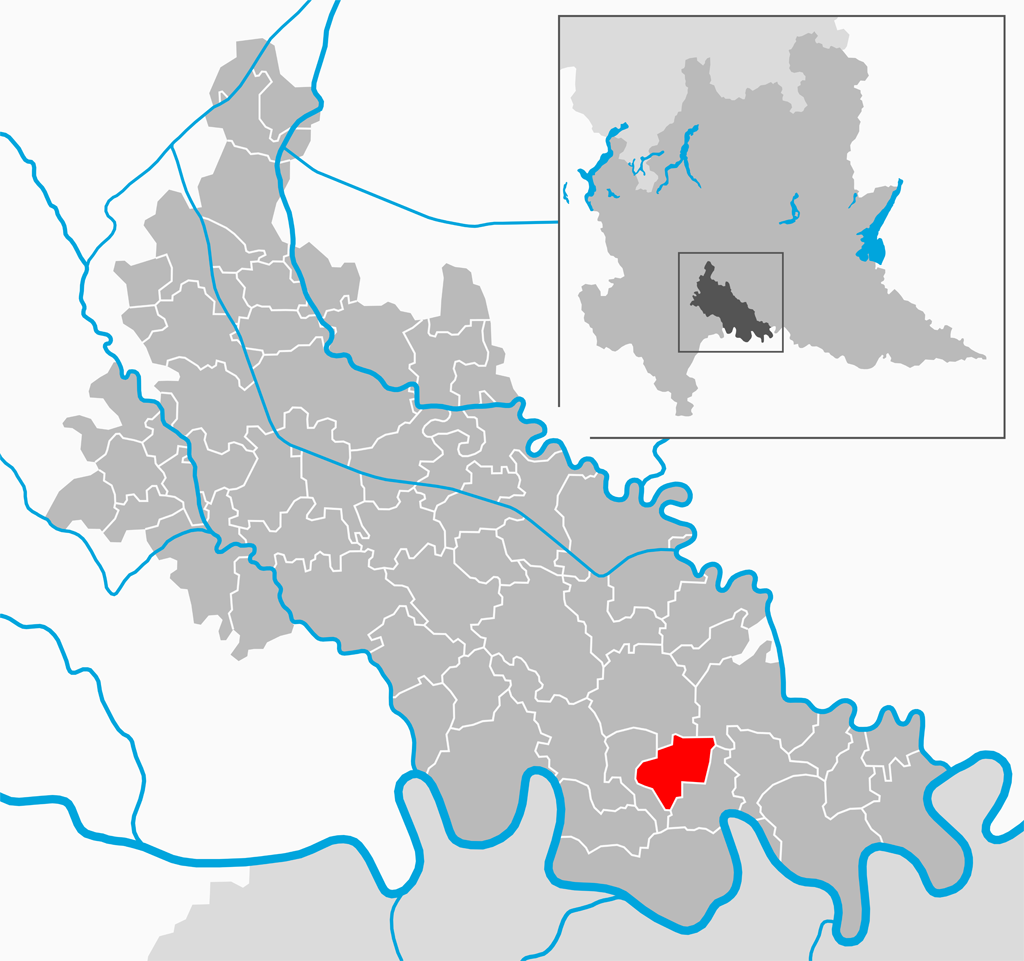

- Location within Italy Location within Lombardy
- Coordinates: 45°7′N 9°41′E
- Country: Italy
- Region: Lombardy
- Province: Province of Lodi (LO)
- Frazioni: Campone, Divizia, Lazzaretto, Regone

Area
  - Total: 8.9 km^{2} (3.4 sq mi)
- Elevation: 56 m (184 ft)

Population (Dec. 2004)
  - Total: 1,724
  - Density: 190/km^{2} (500/sq mi)
- Demonym: Sanfioranesi
- Time zone: UTC+1 (CET)
  - Summer (DST): UTC+2 (CEST)
- Postal code: 26848
- Dialing code: 0377
- Website: Official website

San Fiorano (Lodigiano: San Fiuràn) is a comune (municipality) in the Province of Lodi in the Italian region Lombardy, located about 60 kilometres (37 mi) southeast of Milan and about 25 kilometres (16 mi) southeast of Lodi. As of 31 December 2004, it had a population of 1,724 and an area of 8.9 square kilometres (3.4 mi^{2}).

The municipality of San Fiorano contains the frazioni (subdivisions, mainly villages and hamlets) Campone, Divizia, Lazzaretto, and Regone.

San Fiorano borders the following municipalities: Codogno, Maleo, Fombio, Santo Stefano Lodigiano.

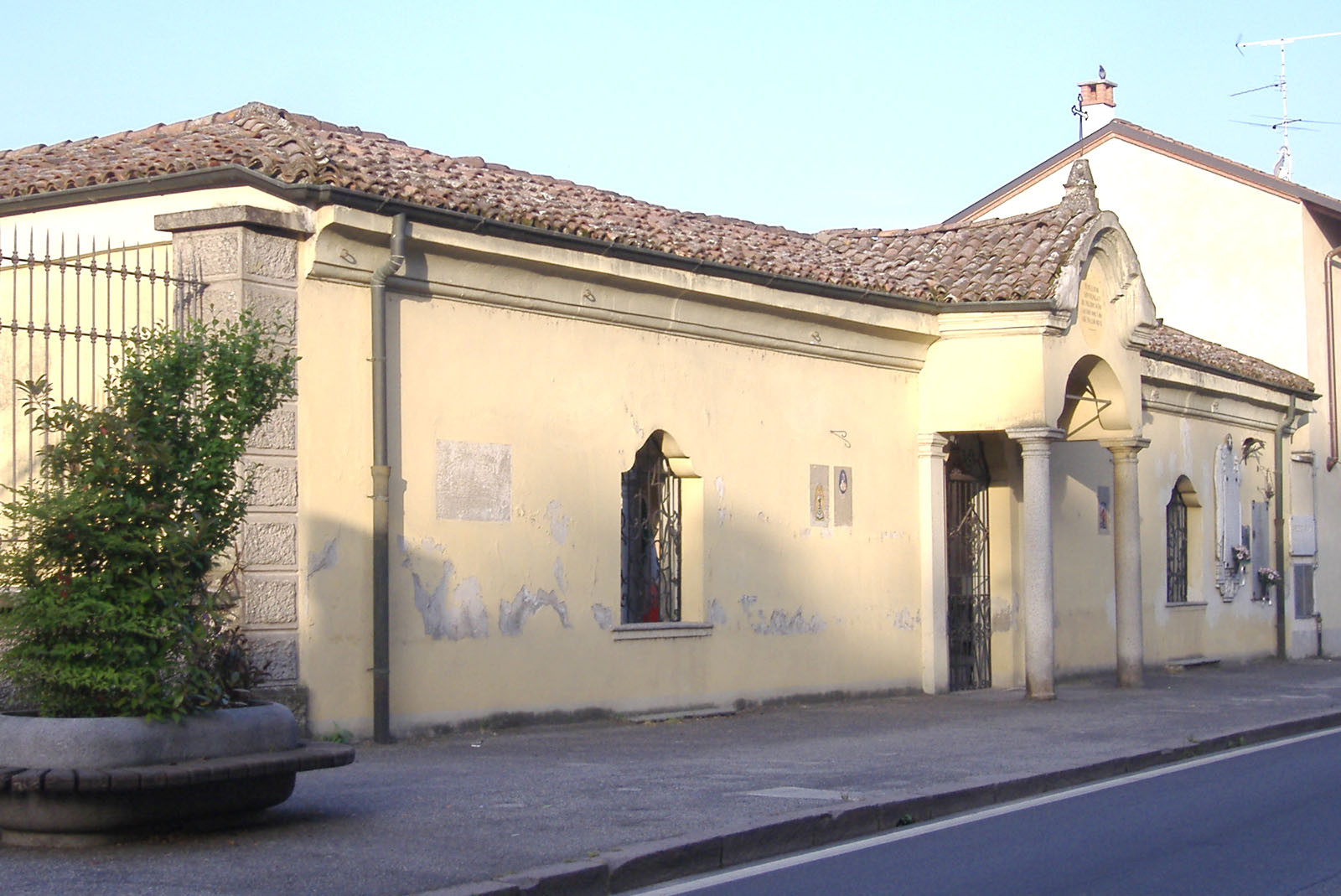
The Lazzaretto

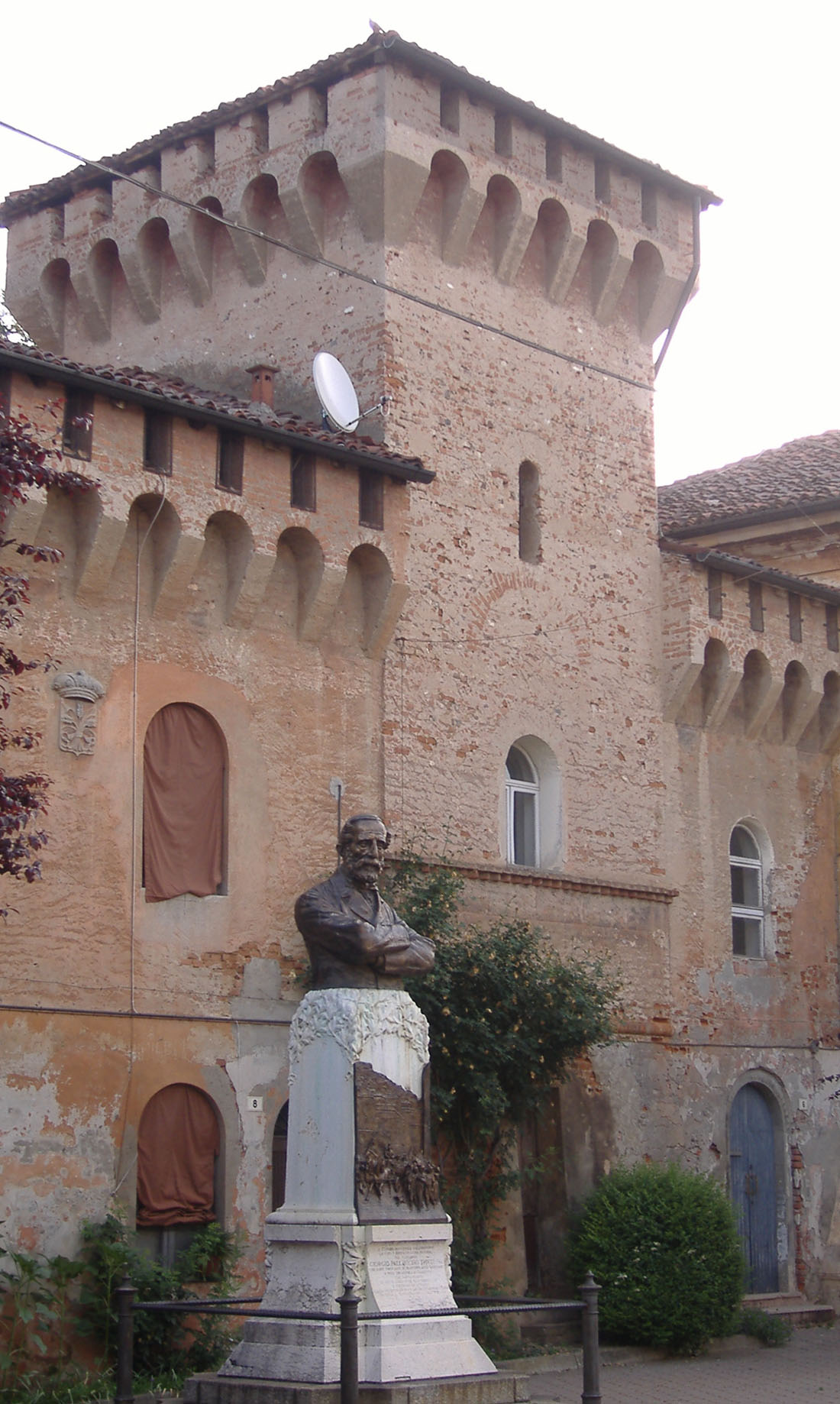
The Castle of San Fiorano

== Demographic evolution ==
Historical population

Year	Pop.	±%
1861	1,691	—
1871	1,579	−6.6%
1881	1,569	−0.6%
1901	1,615	+2.9%
1911	1,634	+1.2%

Year	Pop.	±%
1921	1,642	+0.5%
1931	1,668	+1.6%
1936	1,664	−0.2%
1951	1,628	−2.2%
1961	1,461	−10.3%

Year	Pop.	±%
1971	1,357	−7.1%
1981	1,525	+12.4%
1991	1,619	+6.2%
2001	1,635	+1.0%

Source: Data from ISTAT
