= Somaglia =

Somaglia Sumaia (Lombard)
- Comune
- Comune di Somaglia
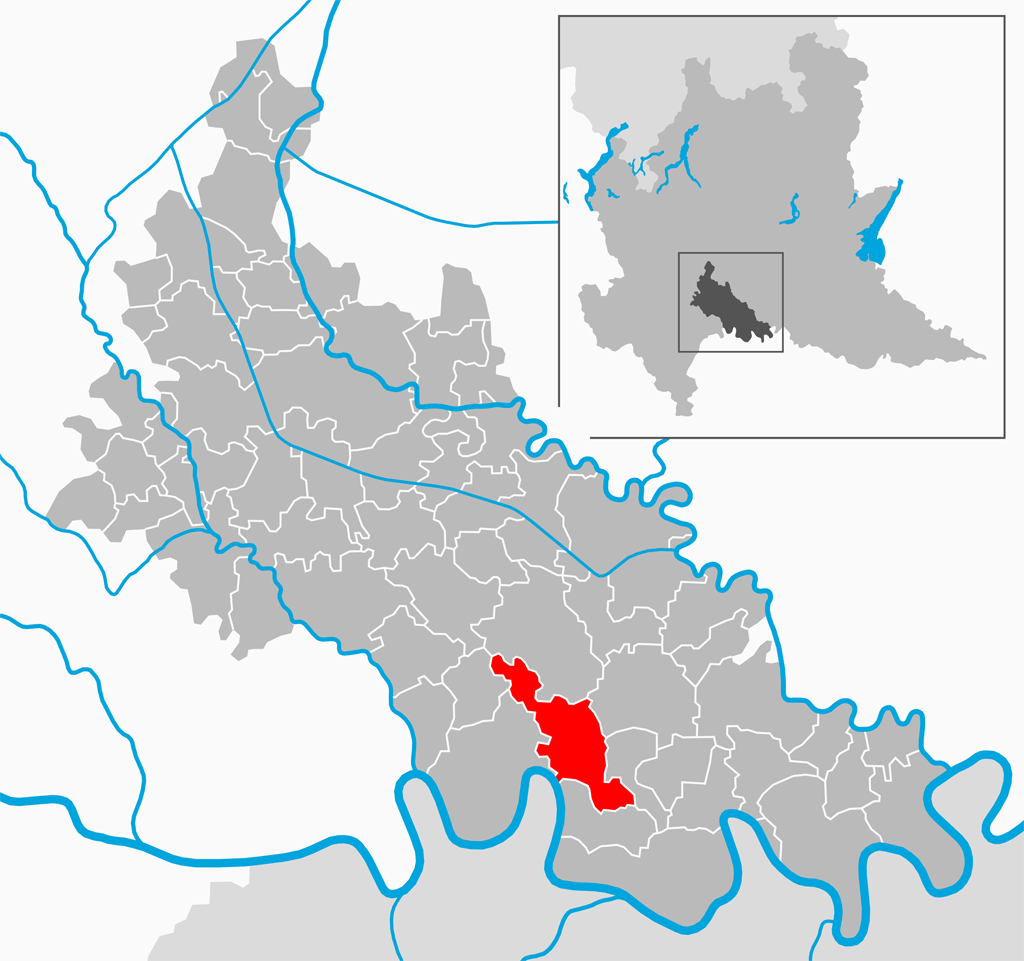

- Location within Italy Location within Lombardy
- Coordinates: 45°9′N 9°38′E
- Country: Italy
- Region: Lombardy
- Province: Province of Lodi (LO)
- Frazioni: San Martino Pizzolano

Area
  - Total: 20.9 km^{2} (8.1 sq mi)
- Elevation: 57 m (187 ft)

Population (Dec. 2004)
  - Total: 3,384
  - Density: 162/km^{2} (419/sq mi)
- Demonym: Somagliesi
- Time zone: UTC+1 (CET)
  - Summer (DST): UTC+2 (CEST)
- Postal code: 26867
- Dialing code: 0377
- Website: Official website

Somaglia (Lodigiano: Sumaia) is a comune (municipality) in the province of Lodi in the Italian region of Lombardy, located about 50 kilometres (31 mi) southeast of Milan and about 20 kilometres (12 mi) southeast of Lodi.

As of 31 December 2004, it had a population of 3,384 and an area of 20.9 square kilometres (8.1 mi^{2}).

The municipality of Somaglia contains the frazione (subdivision) San Martino Pizzolano.

Somaglia borders the following municipalities: Casalpusterlengo, Codogno, Ospedaletto Lodigiano, Senna Lodigiana, Fombio, Calendasco, Guardamiglio.

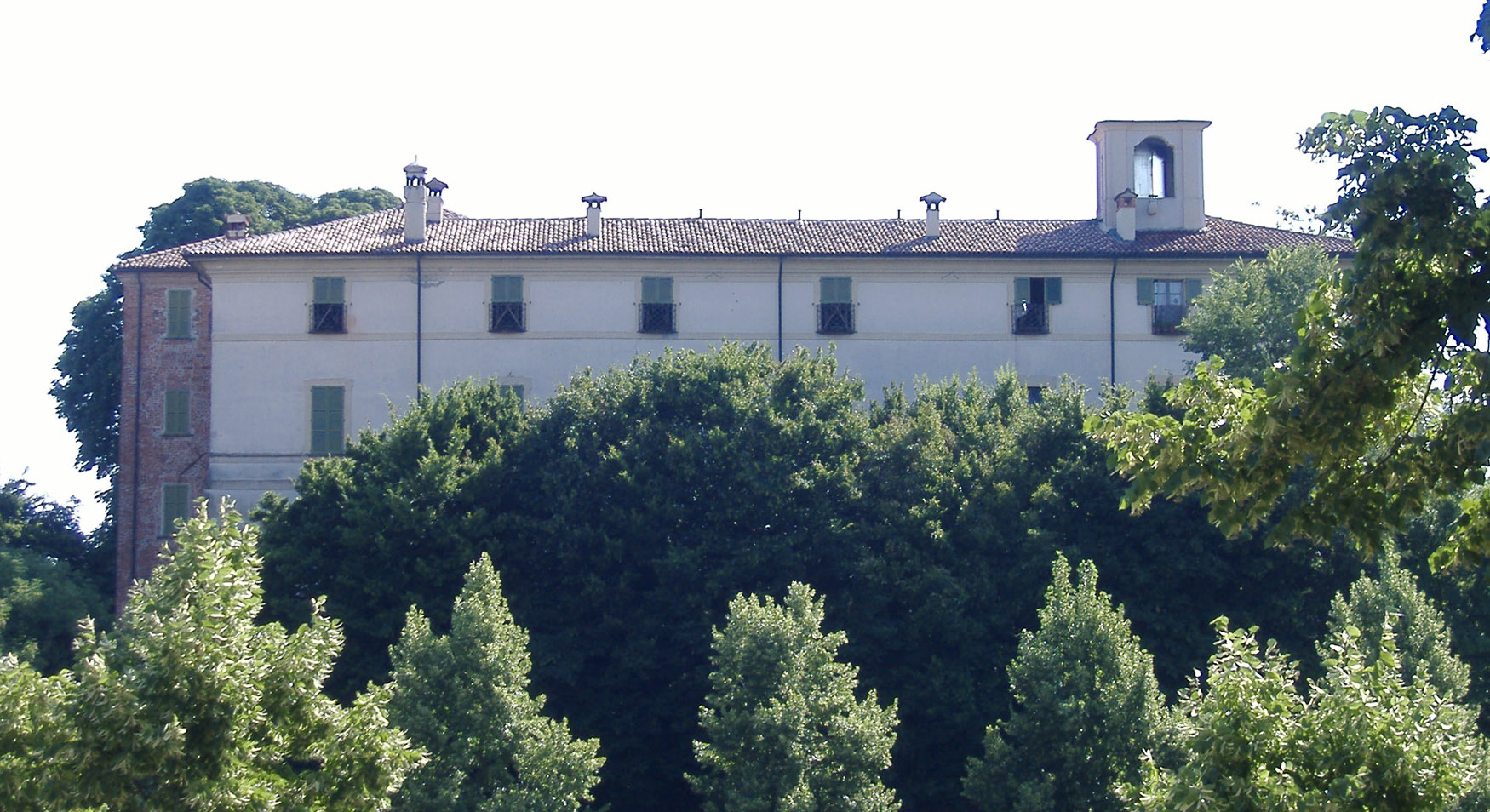
Castello Cavazzi

== Demographic evolution ==
Historical population

Year	Pop.	±%
1861	2,840	—
1871	3,015	+6.2%
1881	3,079	+2.1%
1901	3,350	+8.8%
1911	3,158	−5.7%

Year	Pop.	±%
1921	3,182	+0.8%
1931	3,073	−3.4%
1936	3,141	+2.2%
1951	3,154	+0.4%
1961	3,021	−4.2%

Year	Pop.	±%
1971	2,885	−4.5%
1981	2,884	−0.0%
1991	2,979	+3.3%
2001	3,202	+7.5%

Source: Data from ISTAT
