= Guardamiglio =

Guardamiglio Guardamèi (Lombard)
- Comune
- Comune di Guardamiglio
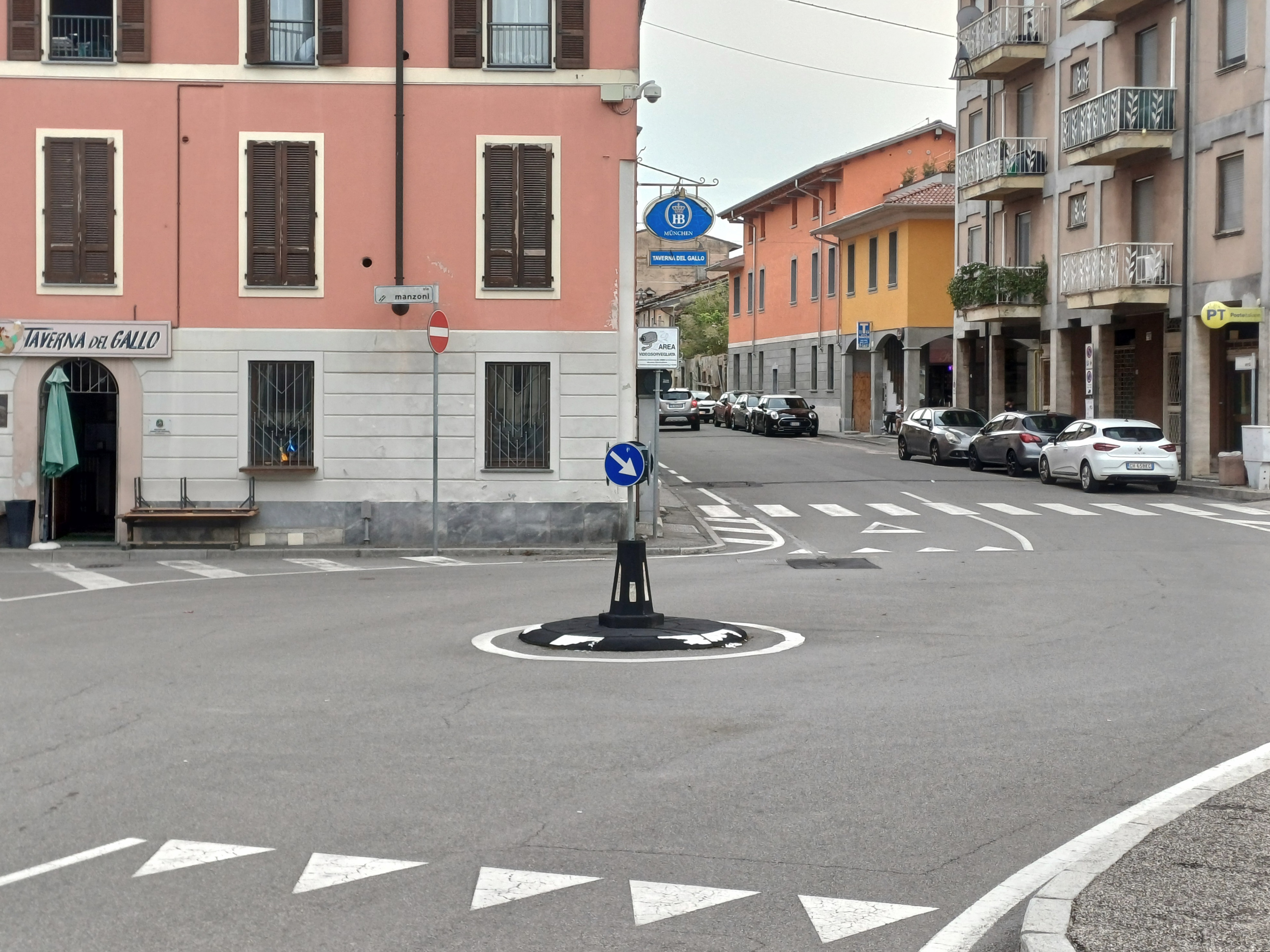

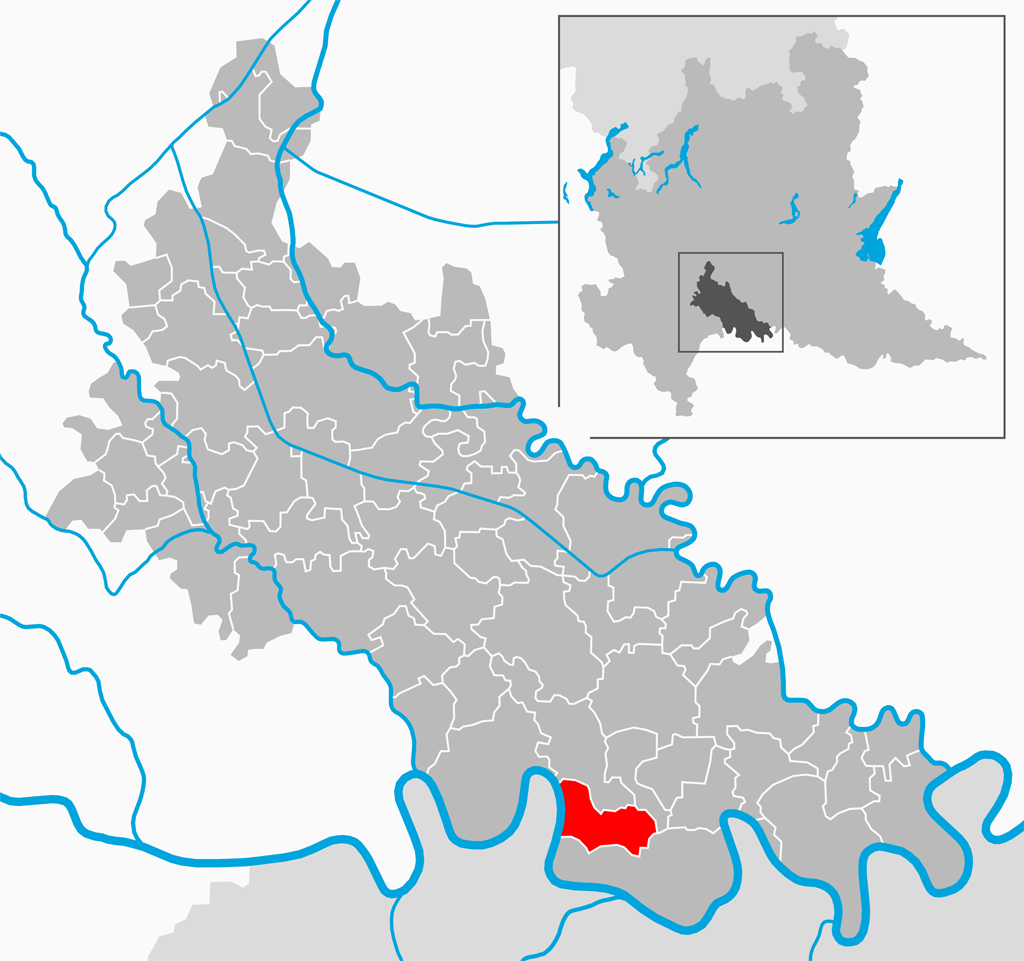

- Location within Italy Location within Lombardy
- Coordinates: 45°9′N 9°42′E
- Country: Italy
- Region: Lombardy
- Province: Lodi (LO)

Government
  - Mayor: Elia Bergamaschi

Area
  - Total: 10.44 km^{2} (4.03 sq mi)
- Elevation: 49 m (161 ft)

Population (31 August 2017)
  - Total: 2,666
  - Density: 255.4/km^{2} (661.4/sq mi)
- Demonym: Guardamigliesi
- Time zone: UTC+1 (CET)
  - Summer (DST): UTC+2 (CEST)
- Postal code: 26862
- Dialing code: 0377
- Website: Official website

Guardamiglio (Lodigiano: Guardamèi) is a comune (municipality) in the Province of Lodi in the Italian region Lombardy, located about 50 kilometres (31 mi) southeast of Milan, about 25 kilometres (16 mi) southeast of Lodi, and 15 kilometres (9 mi) north of Piacenza.

Guardamiglio borders the following municipalities: Somaglia, Fombio, Calendasco, San Rocco al Porto.
