= Maleo, Lombardy =

Maleo Malé (Lombard)
- Comune
- Comune di Maleo
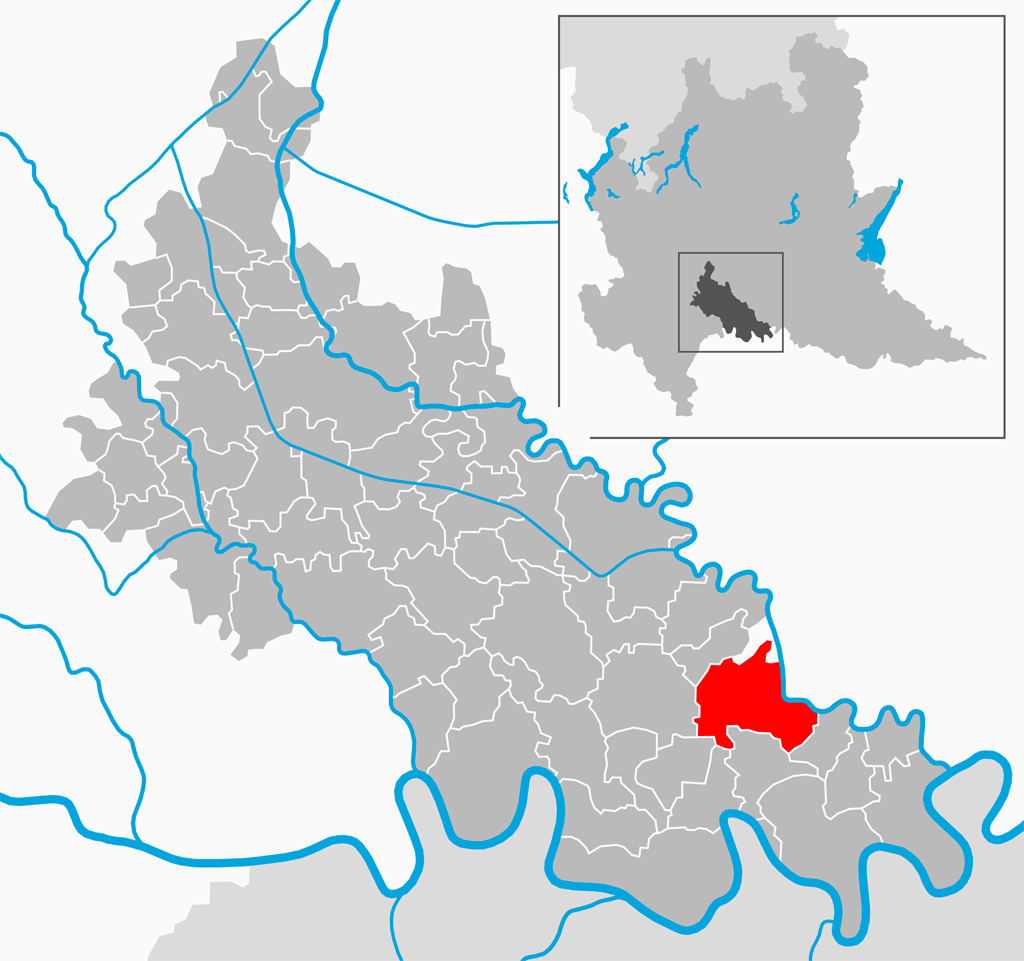

- Location within Italy Location within Lombardy
- Coordinates: 45°10′N 9°46′E
- Country: Italy
- Region: Lombardy
- Province: Lodi (LO)

Government
  - Mayor: Giuseppe Maggi

Area
  - Total: 20.0 km^{2} (7.7 sq mi)
- Elevation: 58 m (190 ft)

Population (30 September 2017)
  - Total: 3,122
  - Density: 156/km^{2} (404/sq mi)
- Demonym: Malerini
- Time zone: UTC+1 (CET)
  - Summer (DST): UTC+2 (CEST)
- Postal code: 26847
- Dialing code: 0377
- Website: Official website

Maleo (Lodigiano: Malé) is a comune (municipality) in the Province of Lodi in the Italian region Lombardy, located about 60 kilometres (37 mi) southeast of Milan and about 25 kilometres (16 mi) southeast of Lodi.

Maleo borders the following municipalities: Pizzighettone, Castelgerundo, Codogno, Cornovecchio, Corno Giovine, San Fiorano, Santo Stefano Lodigiano.
