= Retegno =

- Frazione
- Location of Retegno in Italy
- Coordinates: 45°9′N 9°41′E
- Country: Italy
- Region: Lombardy
- Province: Province of Lodi (LO)
- Comune: Fombio
- Time zone: UTC+1 (CET)
  - Summer (DST): UTC+2 (CEST)
- Postal code: 26861
- Dialing code: 0377

Retegno is a small town within the municipality of Fombio, Lombardy, Italy.

== History ==
Retegno had been Imperial Baronia and a Fief of Trivulzio family.
