= Santo Stefano Lodigiano =

- Comune
- Comune di Santo Stefano Lodigiano
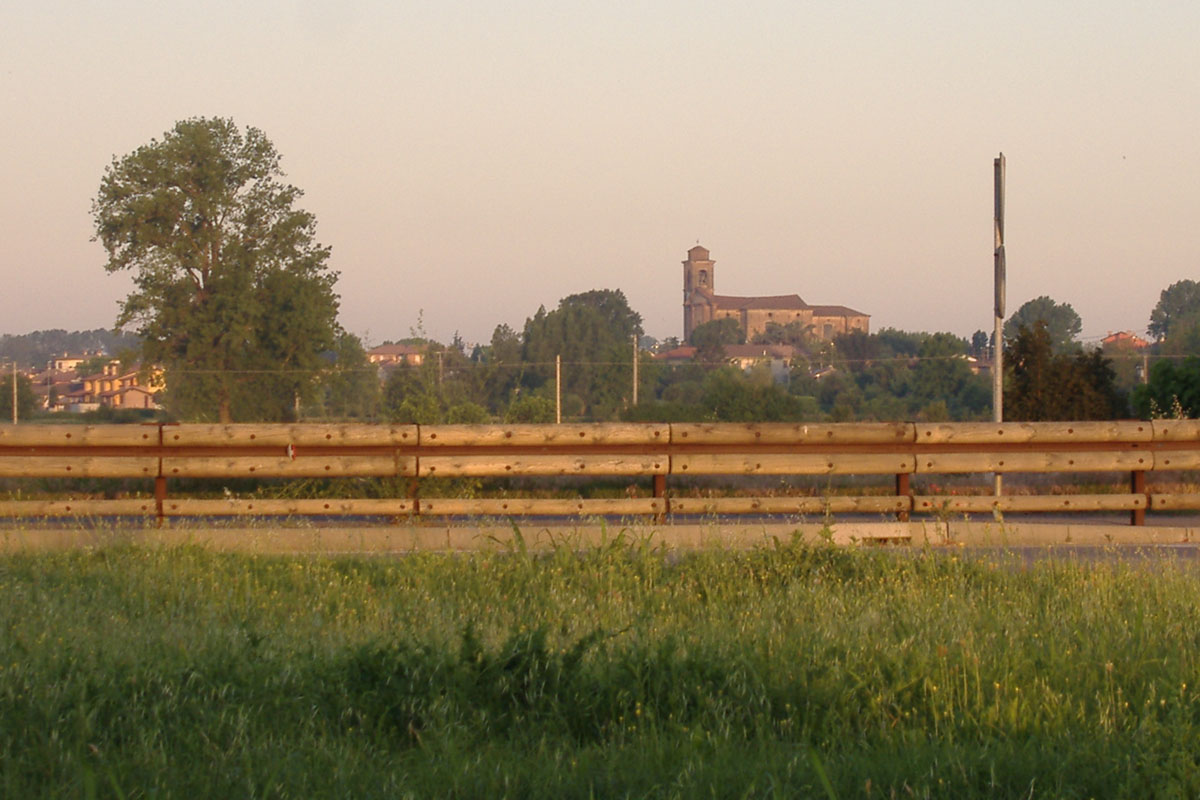

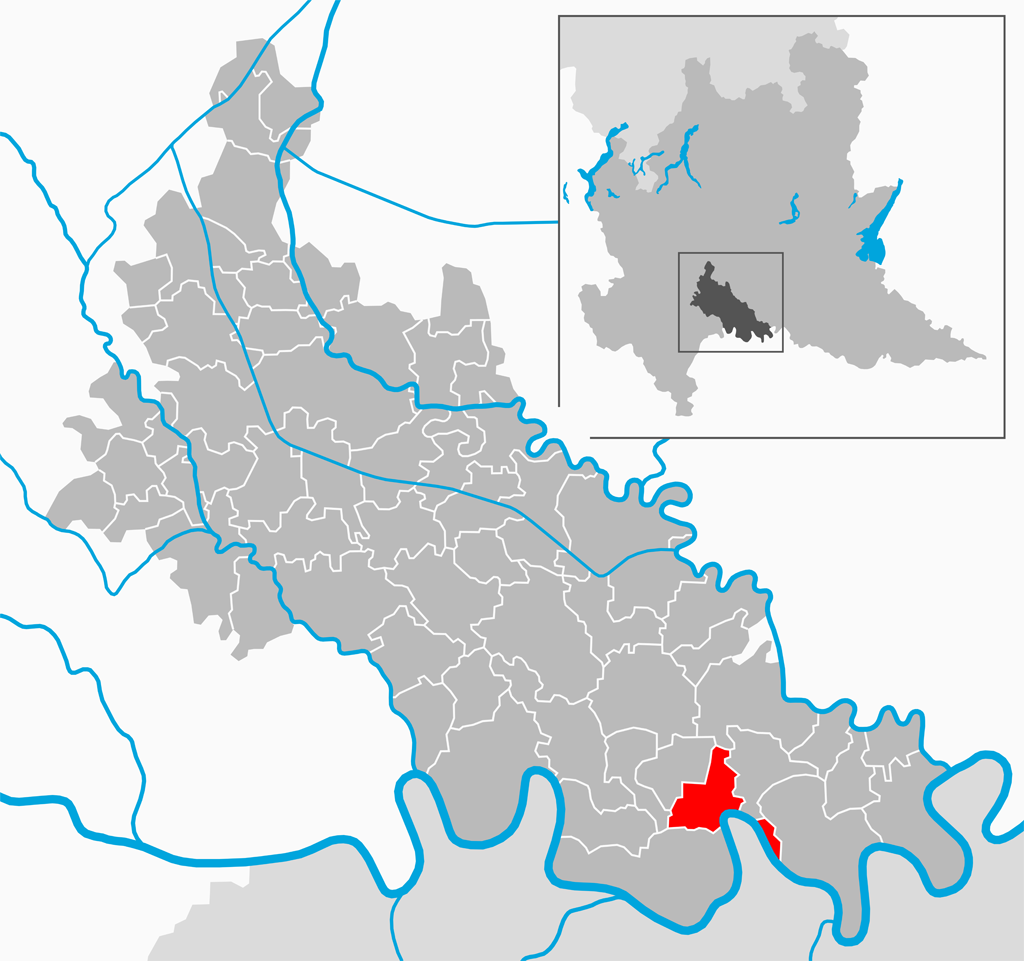

- Location within Italy Location within Lombardy
- Coordinates: 45°10′N 9°46′E
- Country: Italy
- Region: Lombardy
- Province: Lodi (LO)

Government
  - Mayor: Marinella Testolina

Area
  - Total: 10.4 km^{2} (4.0 sq mi)
- Elevation: 48 m (157 ft)

Population (30 November 2012)
  - Total: 1,902
  - Density: 183/km^{2} (474/sq mi)
- Demonym: Sanstefanesi
- Time zone: UTC+1 (CET)
  - Summer (DST): UTC+2 (CEST)
- Postal code: 26849
- Dialing code: 0377
- Website: Official website

Santo Stefano Lodigiano (Lodigiano: San Steu) is a comune (municipality) in the Province of Lodi in the Italian region Lombardy, located about 60 kilometres (37 mi) southeast of Milan and about 25 kilometres (16 mi) southeast of Lodi.

Santo Stefano Lodigiano borders the following municipalities: Maleo, Corno Giovine, Corno Giovine, Fombio, San Fiorano, Caselle Landi, Piacenza, Piacenza, San Rocco al Porto.

The municipality is home to a Baby & Toy Museum with more than 1,700 items.
