= Maurizio Milani =

Italian stand-up comedian, actor and writer

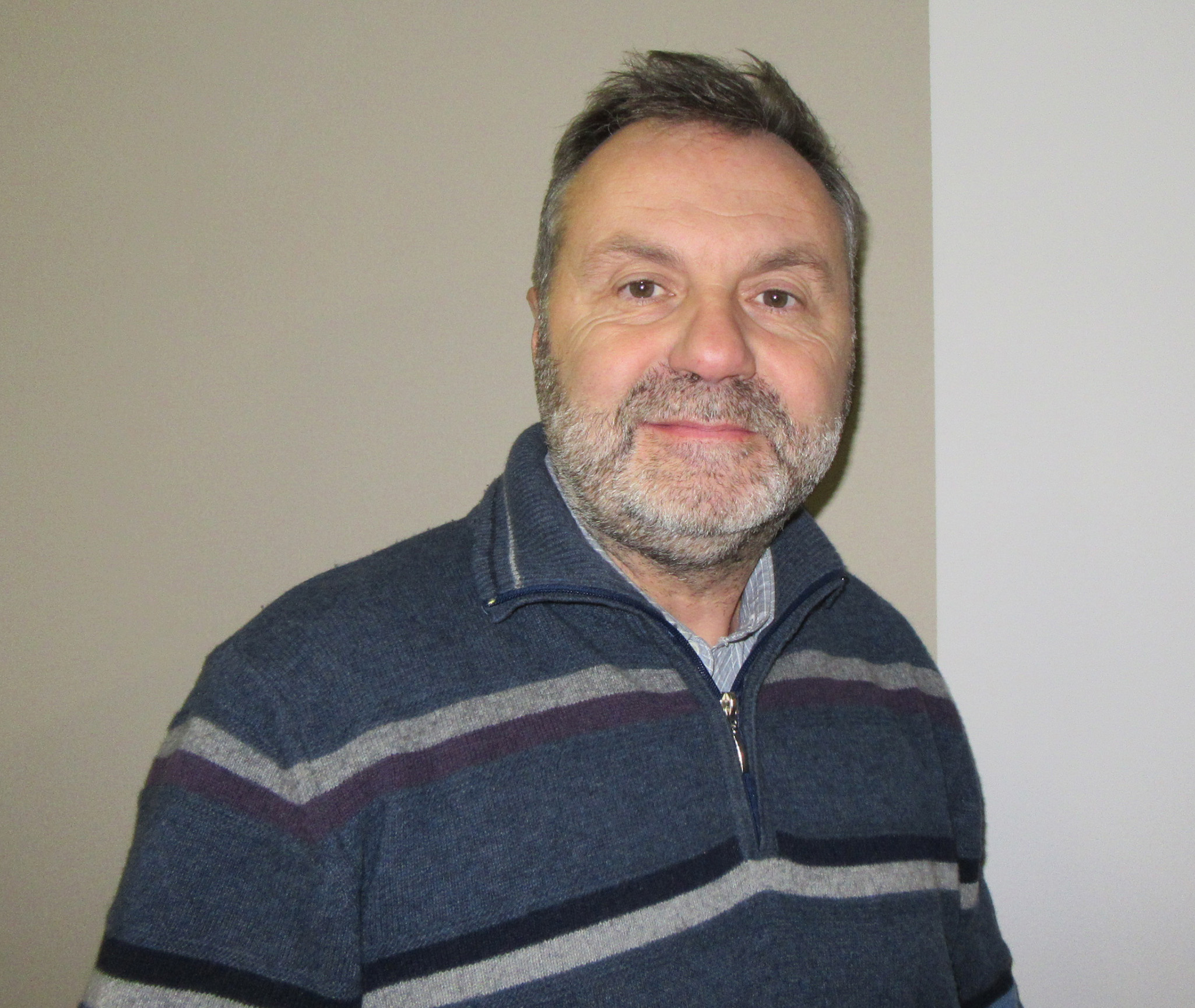
- Maurizio Milani on 18 December 2016
- Born: Carlo Barcellesi; 20 May 1961 (age 65); Milan, Italy
- Occupations: Comedian, actor, writer

Carlo Barcellesi (born 20 May 1961), best known as Maurizio Milani, is an Italian stand-up comedian, actor and writer.

== Biography ==
Born in Milan in 1961, he obtained a degree in agriculture from the "Istituto Tecnico Agrario Statale Tosi" of Codogno, the city where his family is from.

He began as a comedian at Zelig Cabaret in Milan in 1987. The character of his personage is a man of the street, cynical, engaged in thousands of jobs, often dishonest. His monologues are characterized by irony. From 2003 to 2008 he participated as a regular guest to the transmission of Rai 3, Che tempo che fa, conducted by Fabio Fazio.

Very active as author of satirical books, he writes for the newspapers Il Foglio and Libero, and collaborates with the monthly Max.

== Career highlights ==
=== Theater ===
- 1992, Un uomo da badile
- 1993, Piacenza
- 1995, Animale da fosso
- 1995, Il Circo di Paolo Rossi
- 1998, Il pubblico all'uscita si lamenta

=== Television ===
- 1993, Letti Gemelli
- 1992, Su la testa! (Rai 3)
- 1993, Cielito lindo (Rai 3)
- 1997–98, Scatafascio (Italia 1)
- 1998–99
  - Comici (Italia 1)
  - Facciamo cabaret (Italia 1)
- 2003–08, Che tempo che fa (Rai 3)

== Bibliography ==
- 1994, Animale da fosso, Bompiani
- 1996, Un uomo da badile, Baldini & Castoldi
- 1998, Vantarsi, bere liquori, illudere la donna, Baldini&Castoldi
- 2003, La donna quando non capisce s'innamora, Kowalski
- 2005, In amore la donna vuol tribolare, Kowalski
- 2006, L'uomo che pesava i cani, Kowalski
- 2007, Del perché l'economia africana non è mai decollata, Kowalski
- 2010, Mi sono iscritto nel registro degli indagati, Rizzoli
- 2011, Chi ha ciulato la Corrente del Golfo?, Aliberti
- 2012, Fidanzarsi non conviene, Barbera
- 2013, Uomini che piangono per niente, Rizzoli
- 2014, Saltar per terra causa vino, Wingsbert House
- 2016, Il verro ruffiano, Baldini & Castoldi
- 2019, I cani bagnino all'Idroscalo. Quasi un romanzo d'amore per Milano, Aliberti
- 2020, La La Lambro. In viaggio da fermi tra i siti Unesco della cintura milanese, Solferino
- 2022, Il bambino che faceva digerire gli orsi. Appunti sulla diseducazione del fanciullo, Solferino
- 2024, Party all'obitorio. Il libro che vincerà lo Strega o un altro liquore, Wingsbert House by Aliberti
