= San Rocco al Porto =

- Comune
- Comune di San Rocco al Porto
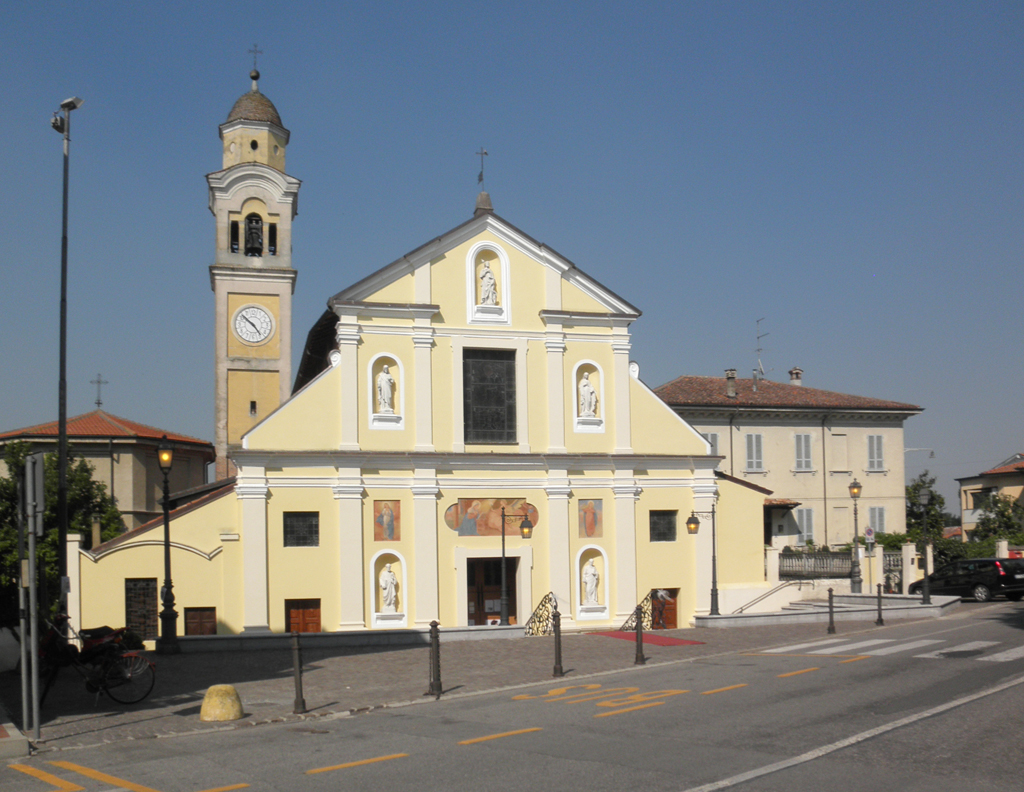

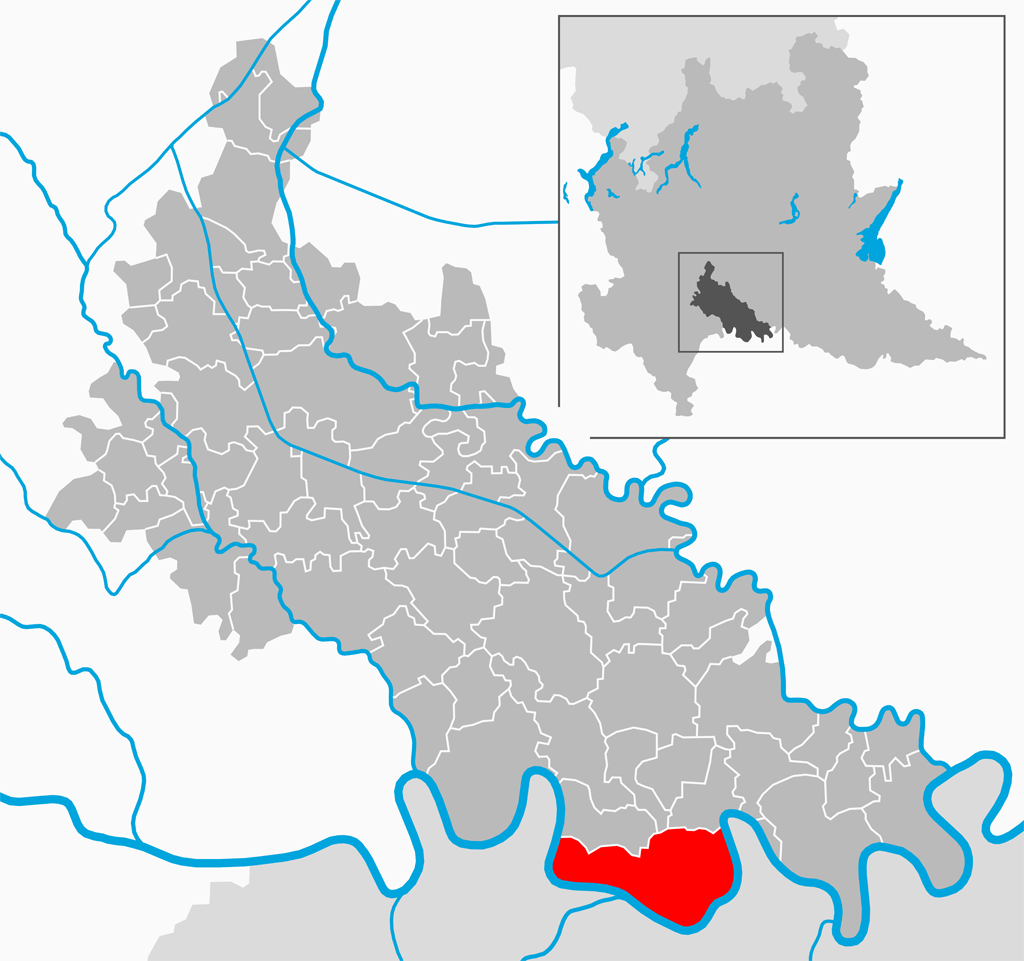

- Location within Italy Location within Lombardy
- Coordinates: 45°9′N 9°42′E
- Country: Italy
- Region: Lombardy
- Province: Province of Lodi (LO)

Area
  - Total: 30.7 km^{2} (11.9 sq mi)

Population (Dec. 2004)
  - Total: 3,383
  - Density: 110/km^{2} (285/sq mi)
- Demonym: Sanrocchini
- Time zone: UTC+1 (CET)
  - Summer (DST): UTC+2 (CEST)
- Postal code: 26865
- Dialing code: 0377
- Website: Official website

San Rocco al Porto (Lodigiano, Piacentino: San Roch) is a comune (municipality) in the Province of Lodi in the Italian region Lombardy, located about 50 kilometres (31 mi) southeast of Milan and about 25 kilometres (16 mi) southeast of Lodi. As of 31 December 2020, it had a population of 5,983 and an area of 30.7 square kilometres (11.9 mi^{2}).

San Rocco al Porto borders the following municipalities: Fombio, Santo Stefano Lodigiano, Calendasco, Guardamiglio, Piacenza.

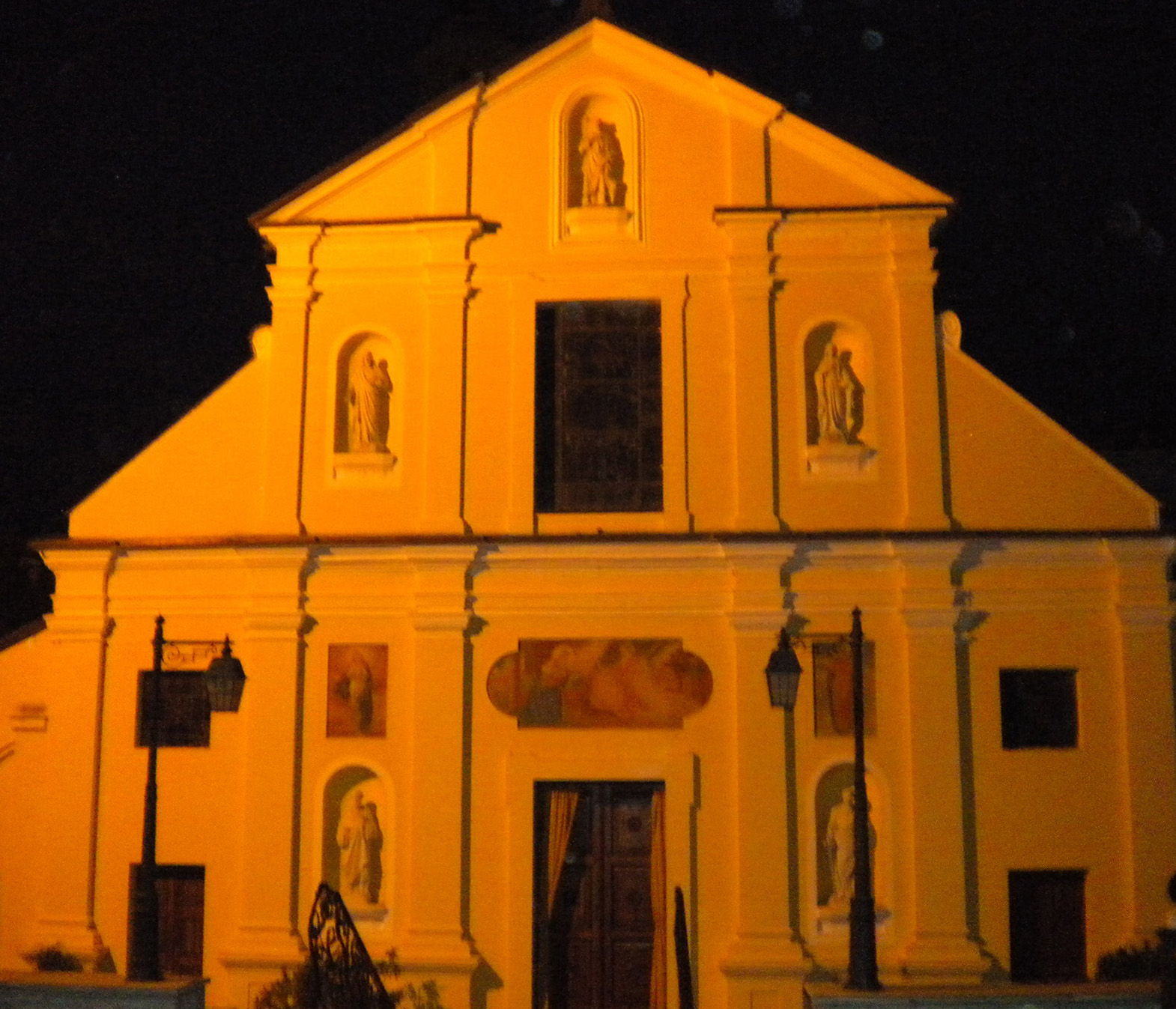
The parish Church by night

== Notable people ==
- Domenico Mezzadri, (1867–1936), bishop of Chioggia

== Demographic evolution ==
Historical population

Year	Pop.	±%
1861	3,014	—
1871	3,131	+3.9%
1881	3,002	−4.1%
1901	3,227	+7.5%
1911	3,462	+7.3%

Year	Pop.	±%
1921	3,690	+6.6%
1931	3,867	+4.8%
1936	3,816	−1.3%
1951	3,887	+1.9%
1961	3,463	−10.9%

Year	Pop.	±%
1971	3,298	−4.8%
1981	3,110	−5.7%
1991	3,100	−0.3%
2001	3,249	+4.8%

Source: Data from ISTAT
