= Giuseppe Novello =

Italian painter (1897–1988)

Beppe Novello
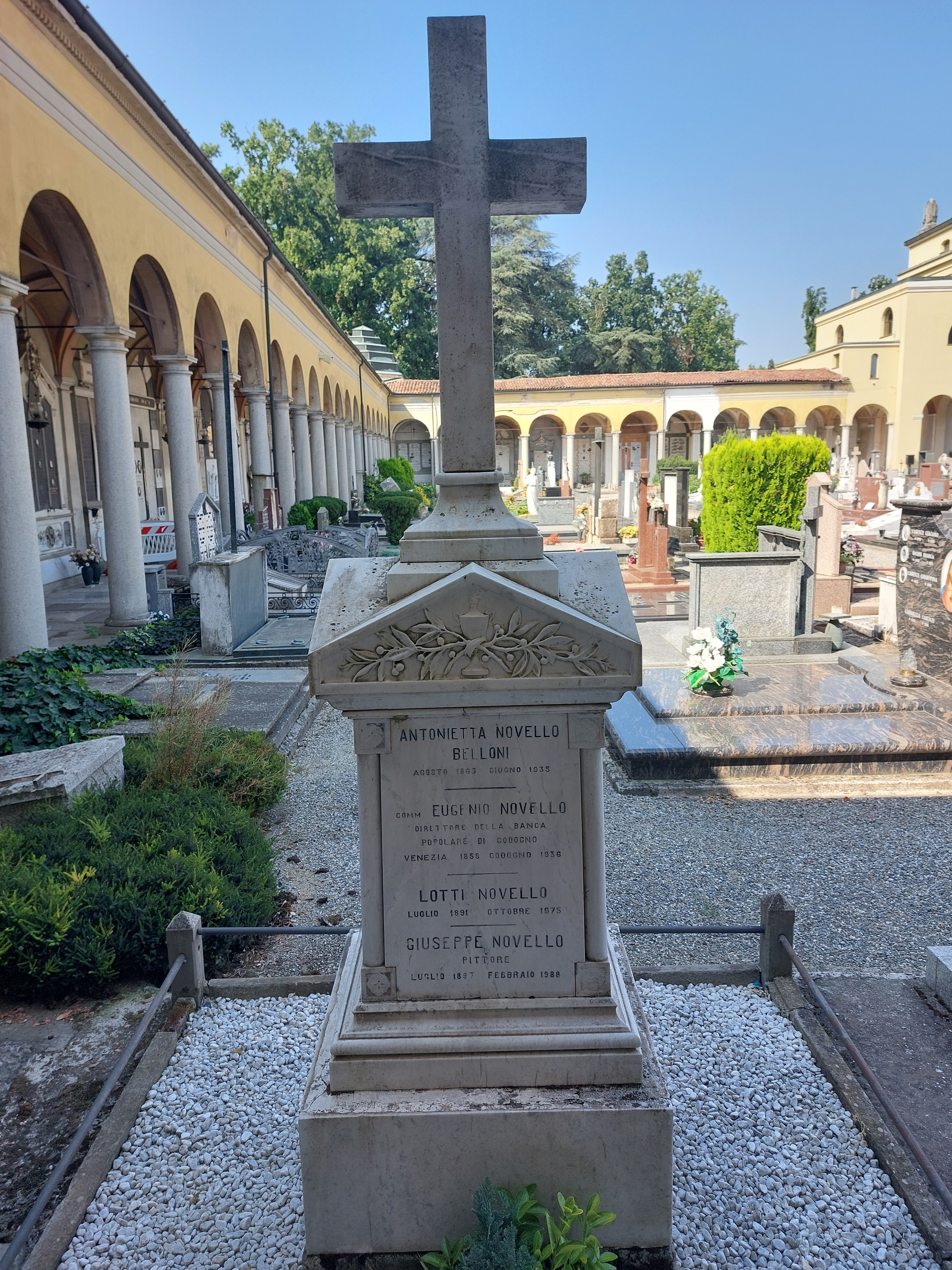
- Giuseppe Novello's grave
- Born: Giuseppe Novello; 7 July 1897; Codogno, Italy
- Died: 2 February 1988 (aged 90); Codogno, Italy

Giuseppe Novello (best known witk the nickname of Beppe, Codogno, 1897 – Codogno, 1988) was an Italian painter, illustrator and cartoonist.

== Biography ==
Novello was born in Codogno, in the south of Lombardy. After completing his studies in Milan, Novello earned a degree in jurisprudence from the university of Pavia. Immediately after World War I, in which he fought with the Alpine Corps, he started studying painting – to which he had been introduced by his uncle Giorgio Belloni – and also took Ambrogio Alciati's courses at the Brera Academy. In 1924, after graduating, Novello won the Fumagalli Prize at the Brera Biennale, and became a driving force behind the coterie of artists who gathered at the Milanese trattoria Bagutta. He subsequently participated in many exhibitions at Società della Permanente in Milan, and in some editions of the Venice Biennale (1934, 1936, 1940) and the Rome Quadriennale.

After the outbreak of World War II, Novello fought in the Russian campaign and was deported to Germany after being taken prisoner in Fortezza in 1943. In the post-war period he took up painting again, displaying his works in several solo exhibitions and showing once more at the Venice Biennale in 1948.

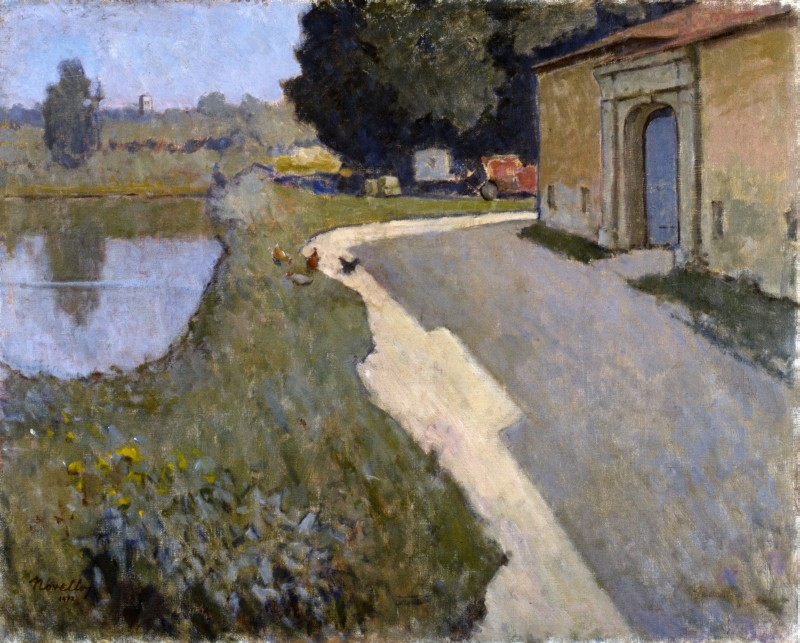
Cascina codognese (La Battaina), 1977 (Fondazione Cariplo)

Novello also made a name for himself as a cartoonist: a collection of his strips, mostly designed as a single rectangular panel with a title on top and a commentary at the bottom, were collected in the volume La guerra è bella ma scomoda (1929) (with a text by his journalist friend Paolo Monelli); Il signore di buona famiglia (1934); and Che cosa dirà la gente (1937). Novello also worked as an illustrator for the newspaper La Stampa until 1965. He died in Codogno in 1988.

== Bibliography ==
- La guerra è bella ma scomoda, Arnoldo Mondadori Editore, Milan, 1929.
- Il signore di buona famiglia, Arnoldo Mondadori Editore, Milan, 1934.
- Che cosa dirà la gente?, Arnoldo Mondadori Editore, Milan, 1937.
- Dunque dicevamo, Arnoldo Mondadori Editore, Milan, 1950.
- Sempre più difficile, Arnoldo Mondadori Editore, Milan, 1957.
- Resti fra noi, Arnoldo Mondadori Editore, Milan, 1967.
