= Corno Giovine =

Corno Giovine Corn Giun (Lombard)
- Comune
- Comune di Corno Giovine
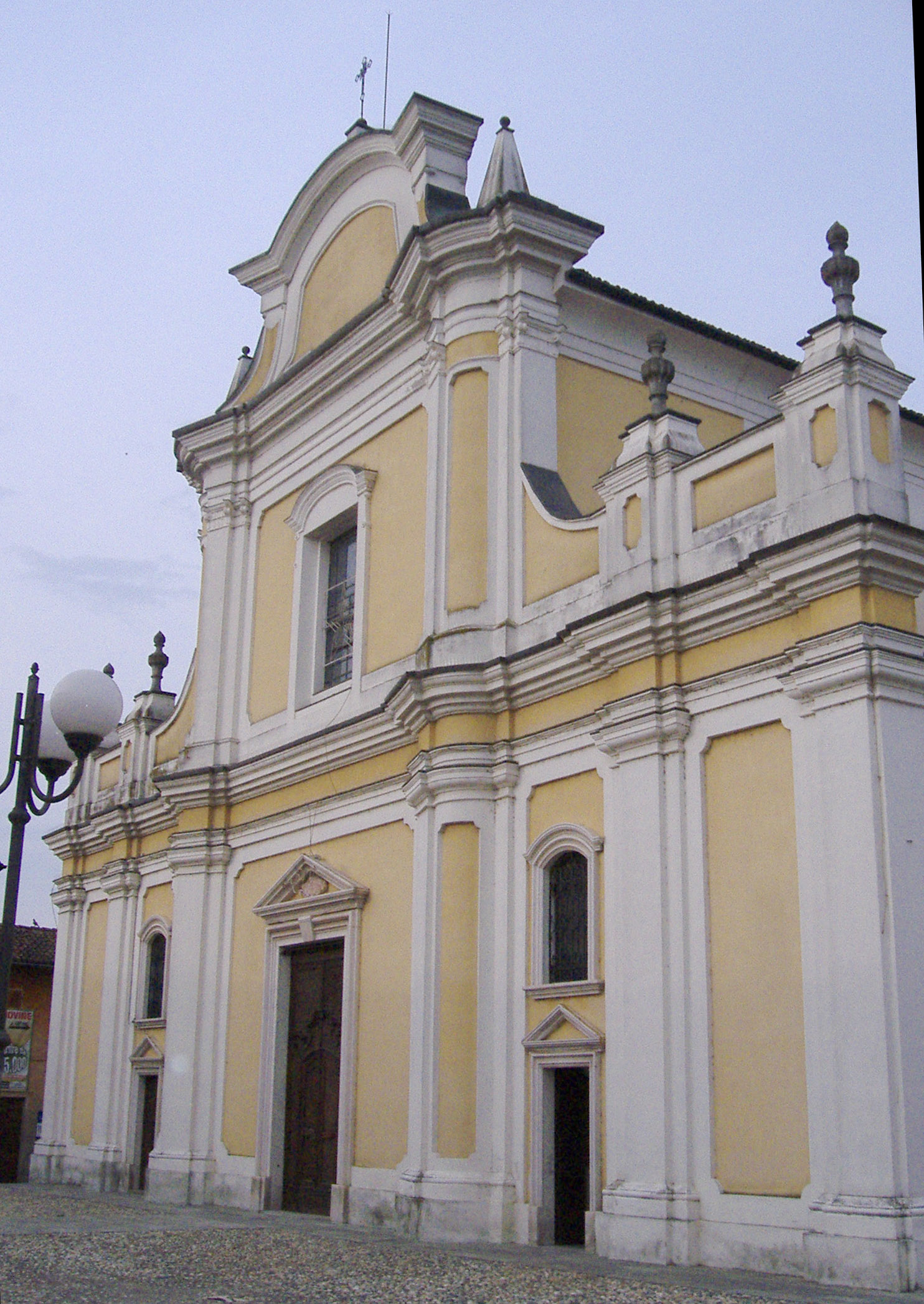

- Coat of arms

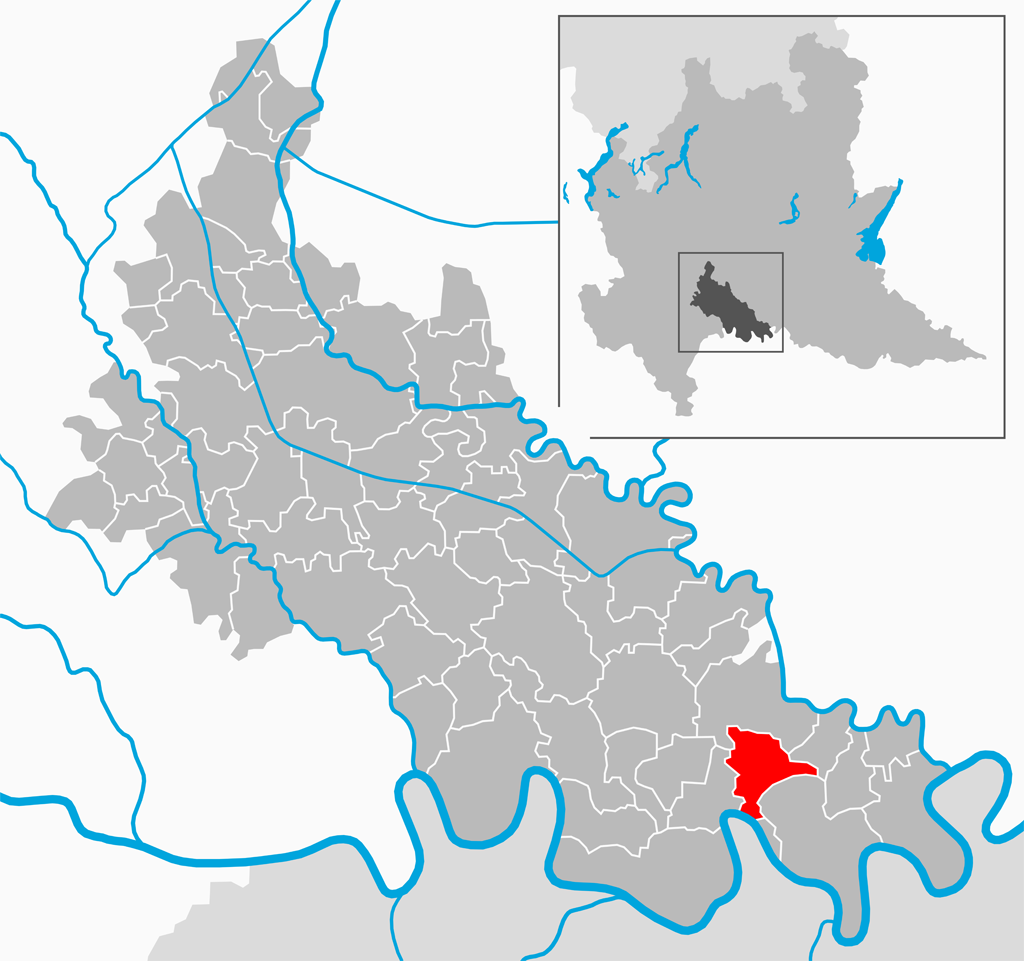

- Location within Italy Location within Lombardy
- Coordinates: 45°1′N 9°55′E
- Country: Italy
- Region: Lombardy
- Province: Lodi (LO)

Government
  - Mayor: Paolo Belloni

Area
  - Total: 9.9 km^{2} (3.8 sq mi)
- Elevation: 50 m (160 ft)

Population (1 January 2009)
  - Total: 1,194
  - Density: 120/km^{2} (310/sq mi)
- Demonym: Cornogiovinesi
- Time zone: UTC+1 (CET)
  - Summer (DST): UTC+2 (CEST)
- Postal code: 26846
- Dialing code: 0377
- Website: Official website

Corno Giovine (Lodigiano: Corn Giun or 'l Corn) is a comune (municipality) in the Province of Lodi in the Italian region Lombardy, located about 80 kilometres (50 mi) southeast of Milan and about 45 kilometres (28 mi) southeast of Lodi.

Corno Giovine borders the following municipalities: Maleo, Cornovecchio, Santo Stefano Lodigiano, Santo Stefano Lodigiano, Caselle Landi, Piacenza.
