= Codogno =

Codogno Cudògn (Lombard)
- Comune
- Città di Codogno
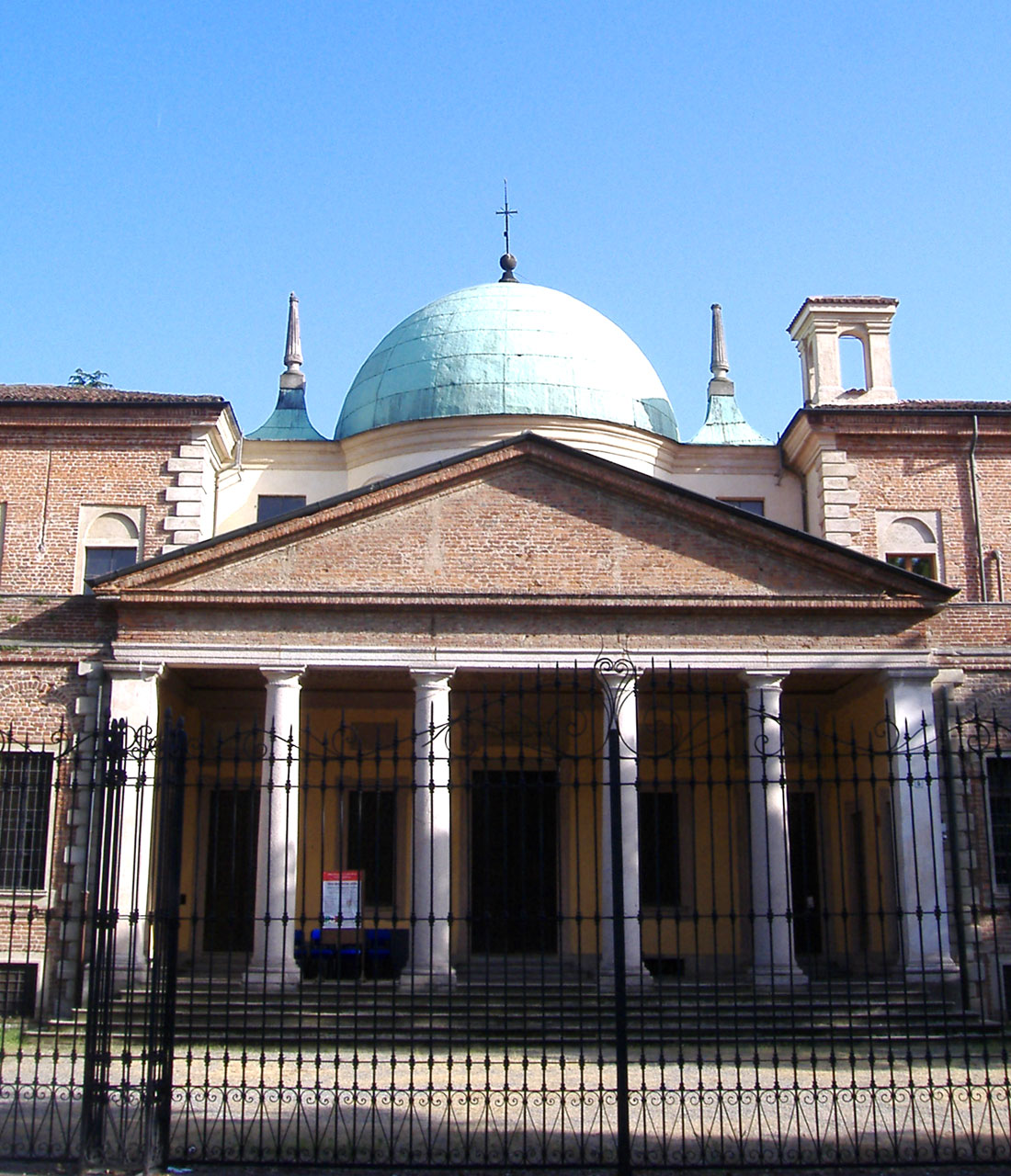
- The old Soave Hospital in Codogno.

- Flag Coat of arms

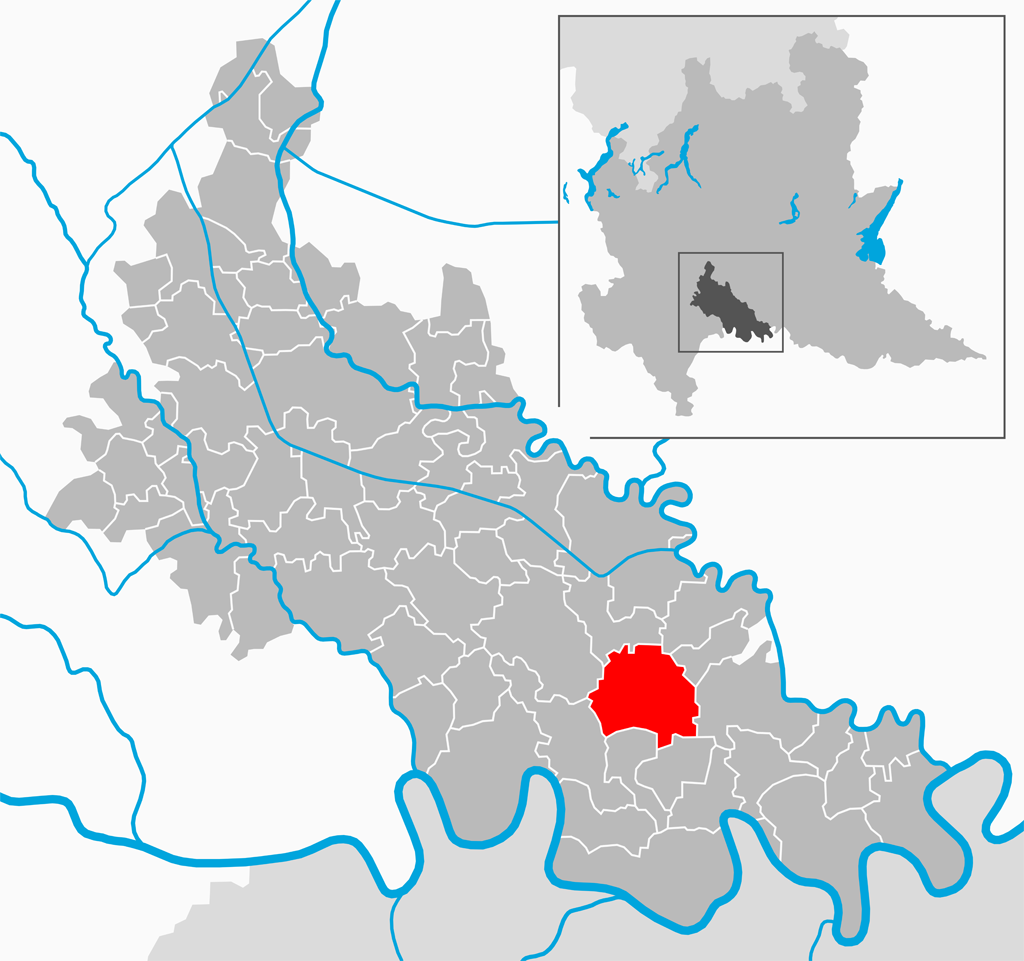

- Location within Italy Location within Lombardy
- Coordinates: 45°09′36″N 09°42′18″E
- Country: Italy
- Region: Lombardy
- Province: Lodi (LO)
- Frazioni: Maiocca, Triulza

Government
  - Mayor: Francesco Passerini

Area
  - Total: 20.87 km^{2} (8.06 sq mi)
- Elevation: 58 m (190 ft)

Population (14 October 2021)
  - Total: 15,789
  - Density: 756.5/km^{2} (1,959/sq mi)
- Demonym: Codognesi or Codognini
- Time zone: UTC+1 (CET)
  - Summer (DST): UTC+2 (CEST)
- Postal code: 26845
- Dialing code: 0377
- Patron saint: Saint Blaise
- Saint day: 3 February
- Website: Official website

Codogno (Italian pronunciation: [koˈdoɲɲo]; Lodigiano: Cudògn) is a town and comune of 15,868 inhabitants in the province of Lodi, Lombardy, northern Italy. It is the main center of the plain known as Basso Lodigiano, which has about 90,000 inhabitants. It received the honorary title of city with a presidential decree on June 26, 1955.

== History ==
There is evidence of a settlement dating back to Roman penetration of Gaul, where it is thought to have been used as a castrum. The Latin form of the name Codogna was "Cothoneum" and is believed to derive from the name of the consul Aurelius Cotta, conqueror of the Gauls, who inhabited these lands at that time. However, it is not until 997 C.E. that the name of the town is found in print. It is mentioned in a charter of Emperor Otto II. It has also been suggested that the name may be derived from the cydonia apple, or the melo cotogno, a variety of quince, both common in this region.

In 1441, after long jurisdiction by the bishops of Lodi, the settlement was sold to the Venetian family Fagnani by Filippo Maria Visconti, the Duke of Milan and subsequently, in 1450, to Gian Giacomo Trivulzio under whom it was granted the status of borgo ("burg", a fortified town) by Francesco I Sforza.

During this time, Codogno had developed a thriving commercial life, and having a fiercely autonomous spirit, they wished to be independent of Trivulzio. The Codognesi sought inclusion in the jurisdiction of Piacenza to have a wider and freer market. Thus, by an act ratified on April 21, 1492, they became citizens of Piacenza. To demonstrate their gratitude, they altered their coat-of-arms to show the Roman she-wolf (the symbol of Piacenza), tied to a quince tree (the symbol of Codogno) with a gold chain.

Codogno became the early centre of the COVID-19 pandemic in Italy when a 38-year-old Italian went to a local clinic reporting respiratory issues on 16 February 2020 and became the first Italian with no travel links to China to test positive for the virus. From Codogno, the virus spread quickly throughout Italy and the city was later quarantined on 22 February. The outbreak in Italy was a key event in the global spread of COVID-19, which was officially recognised as a pandemic by the World Health Organization on 11 March 2020.

== Culture ==
=== Architecture ===
- Monumental Cemetery

== Sports ==
U.S. Codogno (previously "Associazione Calcio Codogno 1908") is an association football club based in Codogno. It was formed in 1908.

== People ==
- Frances Xavier Cabrini - Saint, founded Missionary Sisters of the Sacred Heart of Jesus in 1880; born 1850, died 1917
- Sergio Franchi – singer, dancer and actor
- Tommaso Guercio - Footballer
- Maurizio Milani - comedian and humor writer
- Luigi Negri - politician
- Pino Pagani - radio host and journalist
- Dana Valery – singer and actress

== Twin towns ==
- Solagna, Italy
