= Arcari =

Arcari is an Italian surname. Notable people with the surname include:

- Antonio Arcari (1953–2026), Italian archbishop and diplomat of the Holy See
- Bruno Arcari (disambiguation), multiple people
- Michele Arcari (born 1978), Italian footballer
- Pietro Arcari (1909–1988), Italian footballer
