= Carlos Salom =

Palestinian footballer (born 1987)

Personal information
- Full name: Carlos Antonio Salom Zulema
- Date of birth: 15 April 1987 (age 39)
- Place of birth: Corrientes, Argentina
- Height: 1.75 m (5 ft 9 in)
- Position: Forward

Team information
- Current team: Codogno

Youth career
- Camba Cuá
- 2002: Mallorca
- Almagro
- Sacachispas

Senior career*
Years	Team	Apps	(Gls)
2002	Camba Cuá	–	(–)
2005–2006	Sacachispas	41	(25)
2007	Rayo Vallecano B	0	(0)
2007	Pontevedra	0	(0)
2007–2008	Barracas Central	40	(8)
2008	Sacachispas	0	(0)
2008	Cienciano	12	(3)
2009	Sacachispas	18	(0)
2009–2010	Barracas Central	16	(17)
2010–2011	Olimpo	16	(2)
2011–2012	All Boys	12	(0)
2012–2013	Deportes Concepción	34	(17)
2014–2017	Unión Española	104	(39)
2017	Puebla	5	(0)
2018–2019	Bangkok United	10	(1)
2018–2019	→ Chennaiyin (loan)	11	(1)
2019–2020	Barracas Central	8	(0)
2021	San Luca	3	(0)
2021–2023	Boca Unidos	59	(13)
2022–2023	→ Civitanovese (loan)	2	(3)
2023–2024	Castanese	31	(27)
2024–2025	Tritium	30	(18)
2025–	Codogno	0	(0)

International career
2016	Palestine	1	(1)
- * Club domestic league appearances and goals as of 12 May 2024

Carlos Antonio Salom Zulema (Arabic: كارلوس أنطونيو سالوم زوليما; born 15 April 1987) is a professional footballer who plays as a forward for Italian side Codogno in the Eccellenza Lombardy. Born in Argentina, he played for the Palestine national team.

He is considered one of the top 5 players in Matchday 13 of the Thai League 1 in an article by FOX Sports Asia.

== Club career ==
Born in Corrientes, Argentina, Salom made his debut with Club Camba Cuá from his city of birth at the age of 15 in the Liga Correntina. Subsequently, he moved to Spain and spent six months with Mallorca. Back to Argentina, he was with the youth ranks of both Almagro and Sacachispas.

In 2007, he returned to Spain and was with Pontevedra. Back to Argentina, he was with Barracas Central and Sacachispas before moving to Peru and signing with Cienciano in July 2008.

In 2021, Salom briefly moved to Italy and joined ASD San Luca. Back in Argentina, he played for Boca Unidos from 2021 to 2023 with a stint on loan with Civitanovese. Following Boca Unidos, he returned to Italy to play for GS Castanese and Tritium.

On 17 June 2025, Salom signed with Codogno.

== Controversy ==
On September 19, 2017, Mexico was hit by a strong 7.1 earthquake in the state of Puebla which became known as the 2017 Central Mexico earthquake. After the earthquake, where hundreds of Mexicans lost their life mostly due to the collapse of buildings, Carlos Salom stated that he wished he had never gone to play soccer in Mexico, claiming he was forced to migrate to Mexico by his agent. After his statement, locals and Argentinians that live in Mexico strongly criticized him calling him ungrateful. The most noted was the Argentinean naturalized Mexican citizen Damián Zamogilny, who is considered as an iconic player in Puebla F.C. Zamogilny was quoted saying "if Carlos really wants to leave Mexico, he should rescind his contract and leave as soon as possible". Soon after the social media storm, Carlos came out and apologised for his statement. He was relegated from the first team and was sent to play in the reserves after this incident.

== International career ==
Salom was born and raised in Argentina, but has great-grandparents from Palestine. As a result, he was eligible, and called up in March 2016, to the Palestine national football team. Salom scored in his debut for Palestine in a 1-1 friendly draw against Tajikistan in September 2016.

=== International goals ===
Scores and results list Palestine's goal tally first.

No	Date	Venue	Opponent	Score	Result	Competition
1.	6 September 2016	Dora International Stadium, Hebron, Palestine	Tajikistan	1–1	1–1	Friendly
