= Fraschini (surname) =

Fraschini is an Italian surname. Notable people with the surname include:

- Achille Fraschini (born 1936), Italian football midfielder
- Gaetano Fraschini (1816–1887), Italian tenor
- Mario Fraschini (1938–1983), Italian sprinter
- Isotta Fraschini, Italian car manufacturer
