= Achille Fraschini =

Italian footballer (born 1936)

Personal information
- Date of birth: April 7, 1936 (age 90)
- Place of birth: Casalpusterlengo, Italy
- Height: 1.75 m (5 ft 9 in)
- Position: Midfielder

Senior career*
| Years | Team | Apps | (Gls) |
| 1952–1954 | Codogno | 28 | (30) |
| 1954–1955 | Brescia | 26 | (14) |
| 1955–1956 | Internazionale | 9 | (4) |
| 1956–1957 | Brescia | 34 | (10) |
| 1957–1960 | Monza | 96 | (21) |
| 1960–1961 | Messina | 32 | (12) |
| 1961–1965 | Napoli | 92 | (22) |
| 1965–1966 | L.R. Vicenza | 5 | (0) |
| 1966–1972 | Padova | 197 | (15) |
- * Club domestic league appearances and goals

Achille Fraschini (born April 7, 1936) was an Italian former footballer who played as a midfielder. He made nearly 500 appearances in the Italian professional leagues and scored 104 goals.

== Honours ==
- Coppa Italia winner: 1961–62
