= Ad Rotas =

Ancient Roman settlements

Ad Rotas was the name of several Roman stations or villages.

One, also called Rotae was located in Central Italy and is tentatively located at Monteroduni, Molise, Italy.

One was located in Northern Italy and is tentatively located at Ospedaletto Lodigiano, Lombardy, Italy.
