= Massalengo =

Massalengo Masaléng (Lombard)
- Comune
- Comune di Massalengo
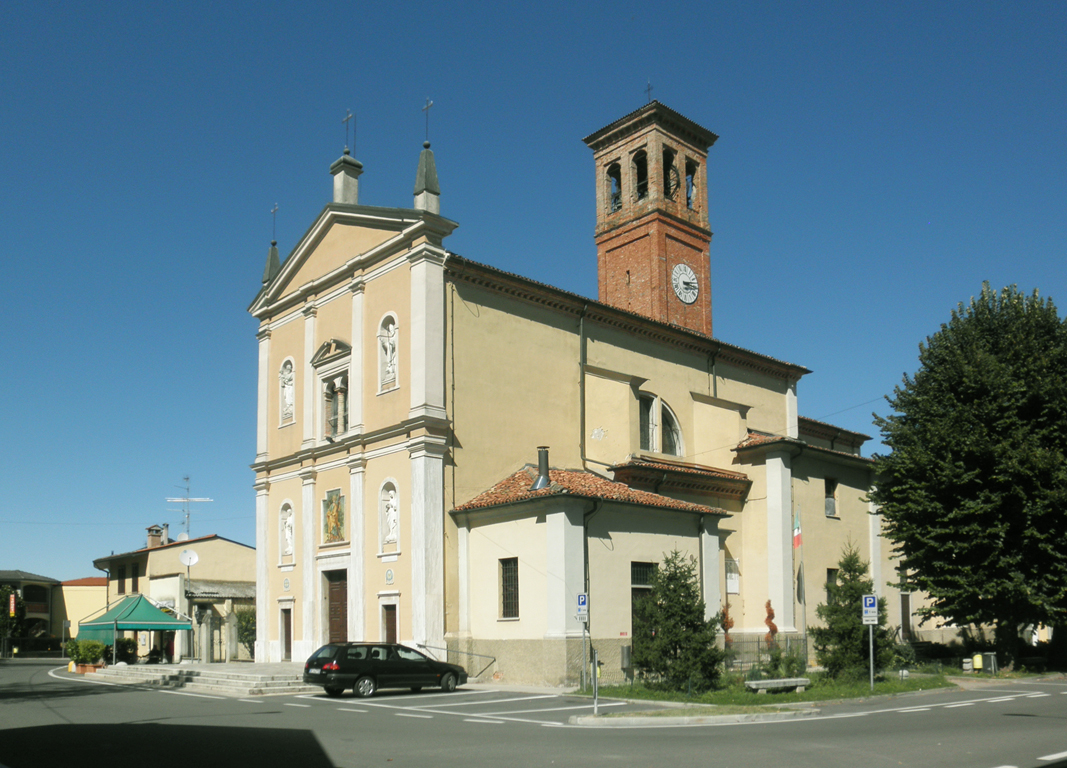

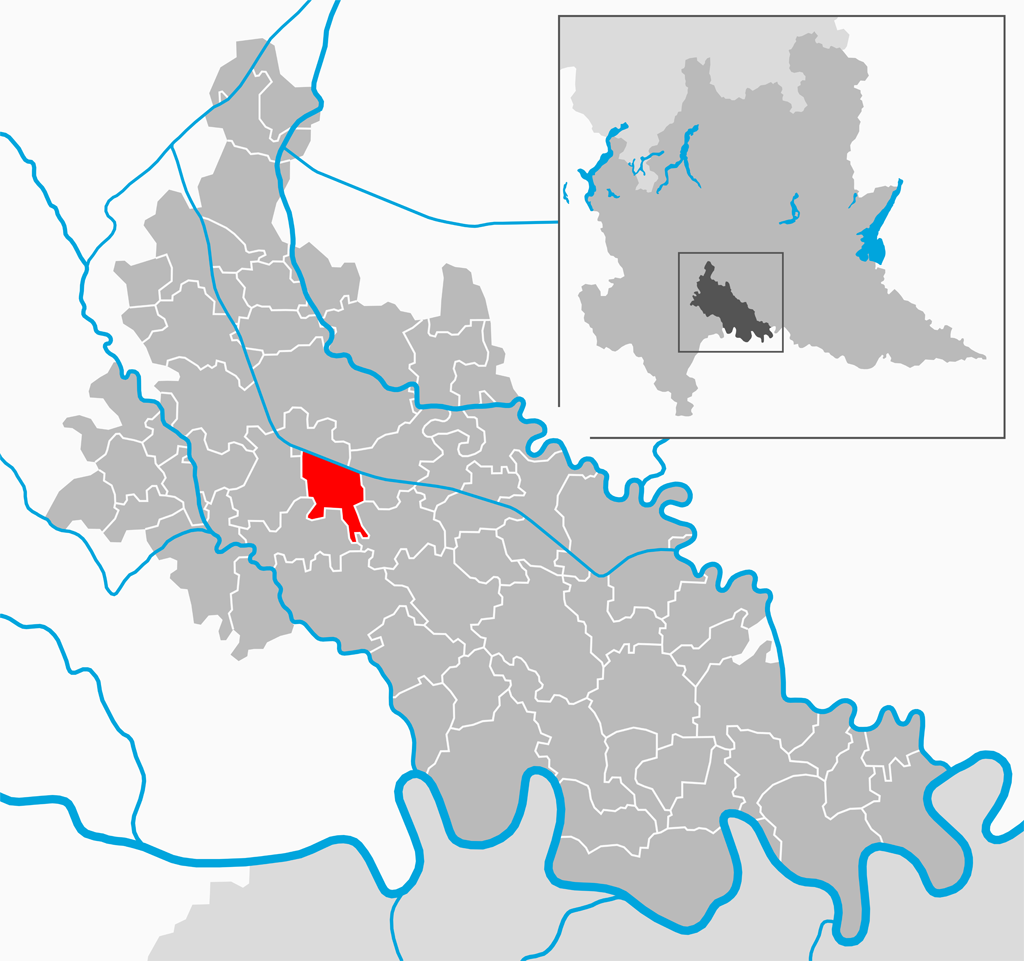

- Location within Italy Location within Lombardy
- Coordinates: 45°18′N 9°24′E
- Country: Italy
- Region: Lombardy
- Province: Lodi (LO)

Government
  - Mayor: Severino Serafini

Area
  - Total: 8.48 km^{2} (3.27 sq mi)
- Elevation: 76 m (249 ft)

Population (31 October 2017)
  - Total: 4,560
  - Density: 538/km^{2} (1,390/sq mi)
- Demonym: Massalenghini
- Time zone: UTC+1 (CET)
  - Summer (DST): UTC+2 (CEST)
- Postal code: 26815
- Dialing code: 0371
- Website: Official website

Massalengo (Lodigiano: Masaléng) is a comune (municipality) in the Province of Lodi in the Italian region Lombardy, located about 25 kilometres (16 mi) southeast of Milan and about 8 kilometres (5 mi) west of Lodi.

Massalengo borders the following municipalities: San Martino in Strada, Cornegliano Laudense, Pieve Fissiraga, Ossago Lodigiano, Villanova del Sillaro.
