= Bruno Arcari =

Bruno Arcari may refer to:

- Bruno Arcari (boxer) (born 1942), Italian boxer
- Bruno Arcari (footballer) (1915–2004), Italian footballer and coach
