= Turano Lodigiano =

- Comune
- Comune di Turano Lodigiano
- Coat of arms

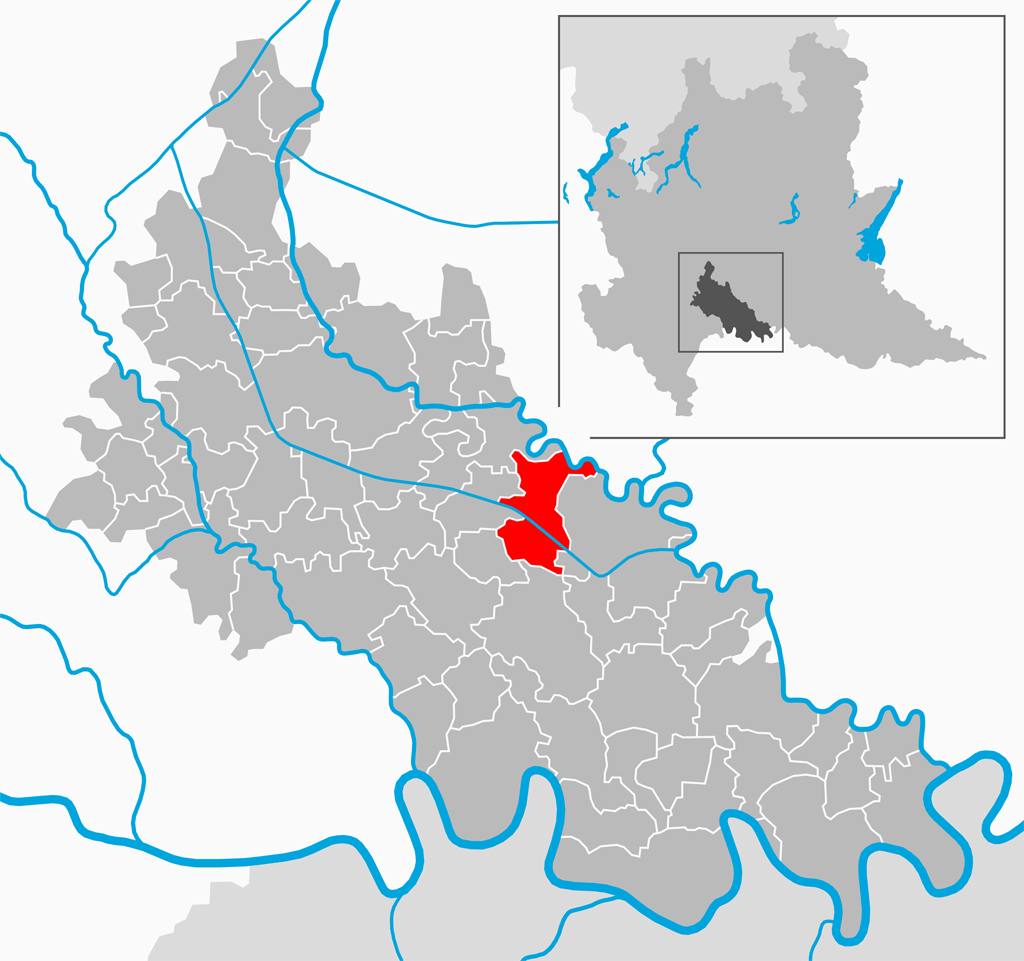

- Location within Italy Location within Lombardy
- Coordinates: 45°18′N 9°40′E
- Country: Italy
- Region: Lombardy
- Province: Lodi (LO)

Government
  - Mayor: Umberto Ciampetti

Area
  - Total: 16.1 km^{2} (6.2 sq mi)

Population (Dec. 2004)
  - Total: 1,331
  - Density: 82.7/km^{2} (214/sq mi)
- Time zone: UTC+1 (CET)
  - Summer (DST): UTC+2 (CEST)
- Postal code: 26828
- Dialing code: 0377
- Website: http://www.turanolodigiano.com/

Turano Lodigiano (Lodigiano: Türàn) is a comune (municipality) in the Province of Lodi in the Italian region Lombardy, located about 45 kilometres (28 mi) southeast of Milan and about 13 kilometres (8 mi) east of Lodi.

Turano Lodigiano borders the following municipalities: Credera Rubbiano, Moscazzano, Cavenago d'Adda, Mairago, Bertonico, Secugnago, Casalpusterlengo, Terranova dei Passerini.
