= Ossago Lodigiano =

- Comune
- Comune di Ossago Lodigiano
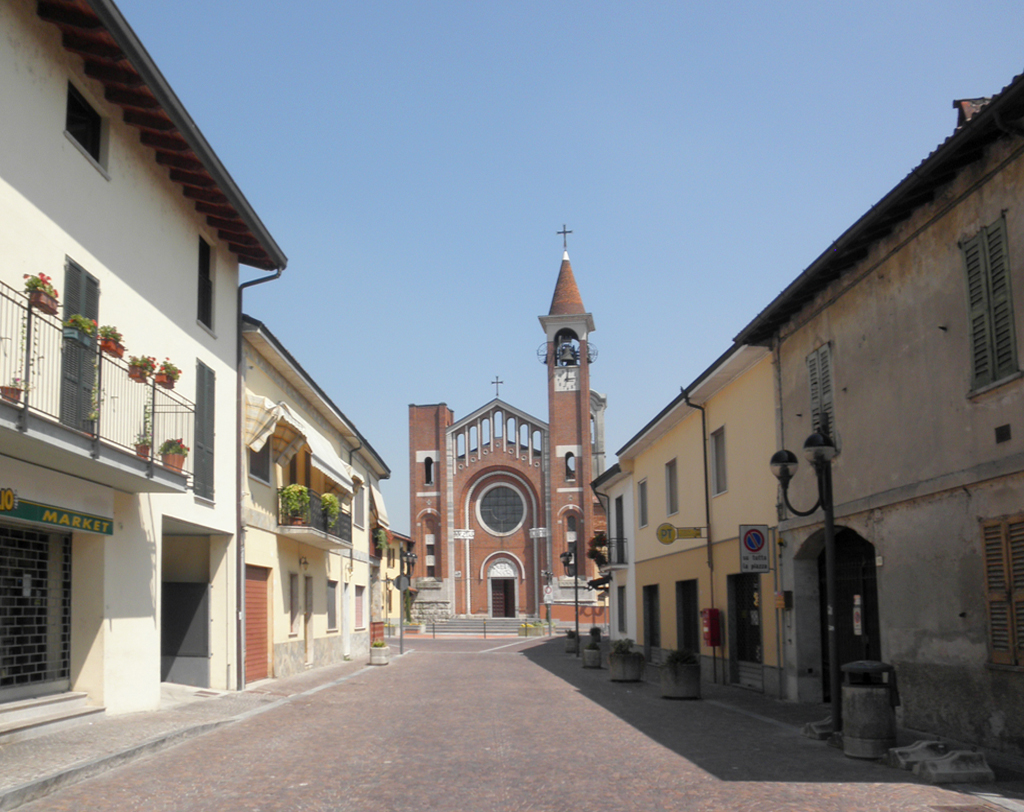

- Coat of arms

- Location within Italy Location within Lombardy
- Coordinates: 45°15′N 9°32′E
- Country: Italy
- Region: Lombardy
- Province: Lodi (LO)
- Frazioni: Brusada

Government
  - Mayor: Luigi Granata

Area
  - Total: 11.53 km^{2} (4.45 sq mi)
- Elevation: 71 m (233 ft)

Population (31 December 2017)
  - Total: 1,416
  - Density: 122.8/km^{2} (318.1/sq mi)
- Demonym: Ossaghini
- Time zone: UTC+1 (CET)
  - Summer (DST): UTC+2 (CEST)
- Postal code: 26816
- Dialing code: 0371
- Website: Official website

Ossago Lodigiano (Lodigiano: Usàgh) is a comune (municipality) in the Province of Lodi in the Italian region Lombardy, located about 35 kilometres (22 mi) southeast of Milan and about 8 kilometres (5 mi) southeast of Lodi.

Ossago Lodigiano borders the following municipalities: Cavenago d'Adda, San Martino in Strada, Massalengo, Mairago, Villanova del Sillaro, Brembio, Borghetto Lodigiano.
