= Pietro Arcari =

Italian footballer (1909–1988)

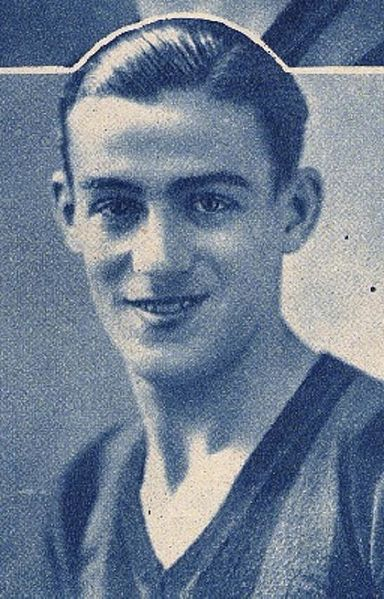

Personal information
- Full name: Pietro Sante Arcari III
- Date of birth: 2 December 1909
- Place of birth: Casalpusterlengo, Italy
- Date of death: 8 February 1988 (aged 78)
- Place of death: Cremona, Italy
- Height: 1.75 m (5 ft 9 in)
- Position: Forward

Senior career*
Years	Team	Apps	(Gls)
1926–1930	Codogno	?	(?)
1930–1936	Milan	186	(70)
1936–1939	Genoa	72	(14)
1939–1942	Cremonese	54	(22)
1942–1943	Napoli	6	(0)
1944	Vastese	?	(?)
1945–1946	Codogno	5	(?)

Managerial career
- 1947–1949: Codogno
Medal record
Italy
FIFA World Cup
Gold medal – first place	1934 Italy
- * Club domestic league appearances and goals

Pietro Sante Arcari III (2 December 1909 – 8 February 1988) was an Italian footballer and forward, or as a right winger.

== Career ==
Born in Casalpusterlengo, Province of Lodi, he played in the 1930s for A.C. Milan, and Genoa. A prolific goalscorer, known for his speed and ability in the air, he played 256 matches in Serie A, scoring 80 goals.

In the 1933–34 season, he scored 16 goals for Milan, finishing the season as the fifth highest scorer in Serie A, leading to his selection by manager Vittorio Pozzo to the national team for the 1934 FIFA World Cup on home soil. Italy won the title, although Arcari did not make a single appearance throughout the tournament; consequently, he is one of only four players in Italy national team history to become World champion while never being capped.

While Pietro's most notable success came at Milan, an unusual incident occurred while playing for Genoa in 1937. During a Fiorentina-Genoa match won 2–1 by Genoa in Florence the linesman called a nonexistent offsides on Arcari; the referee Caironi, without hesitation sent his colleague to the locker room, who was quickly replaced. That season, he won the Coppa Italia, as Genoa defeated Roma 1–0 in the final, played in Florence, on 6 June 1937; en route to the final, he eliminated his former club Milan in the semi-finals of the competition.

== Personal life ==
Pietro was the third son in a family of footballers: his older brothers Carlo Arcari and Angelo Arcari and younger brother Bruno Arcari all played football professionally. To distinguish them, Carlo was referred to as Arcari I, Angelo as Arcari II, Pietro as Arcari III and Bruno as Arcari IV. His brother Bruno, who also played for Milan throughout his career, even made an appearance for the national team.

== Honours ==
=== Club ===
Genoa

- Coppa Italia: 1936–37

=== International ===
Italy

- FIFA World Cup: 1934
