= Pieve Fissiraga =

- Comune
- Comune di Pieve Fissiraga
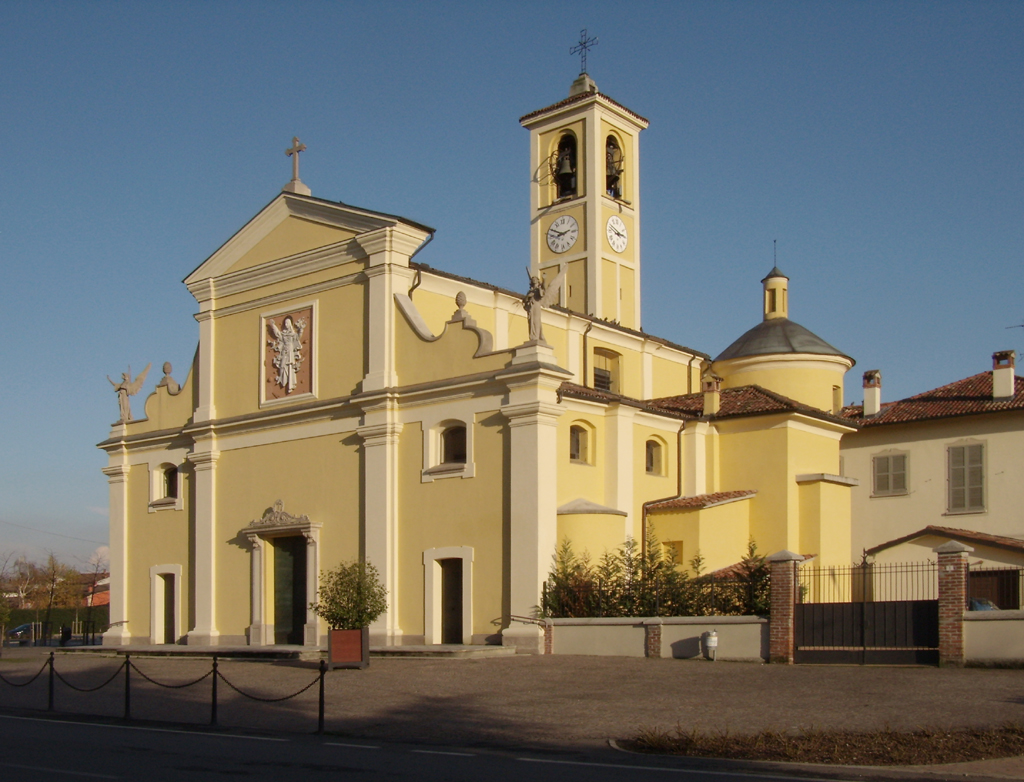

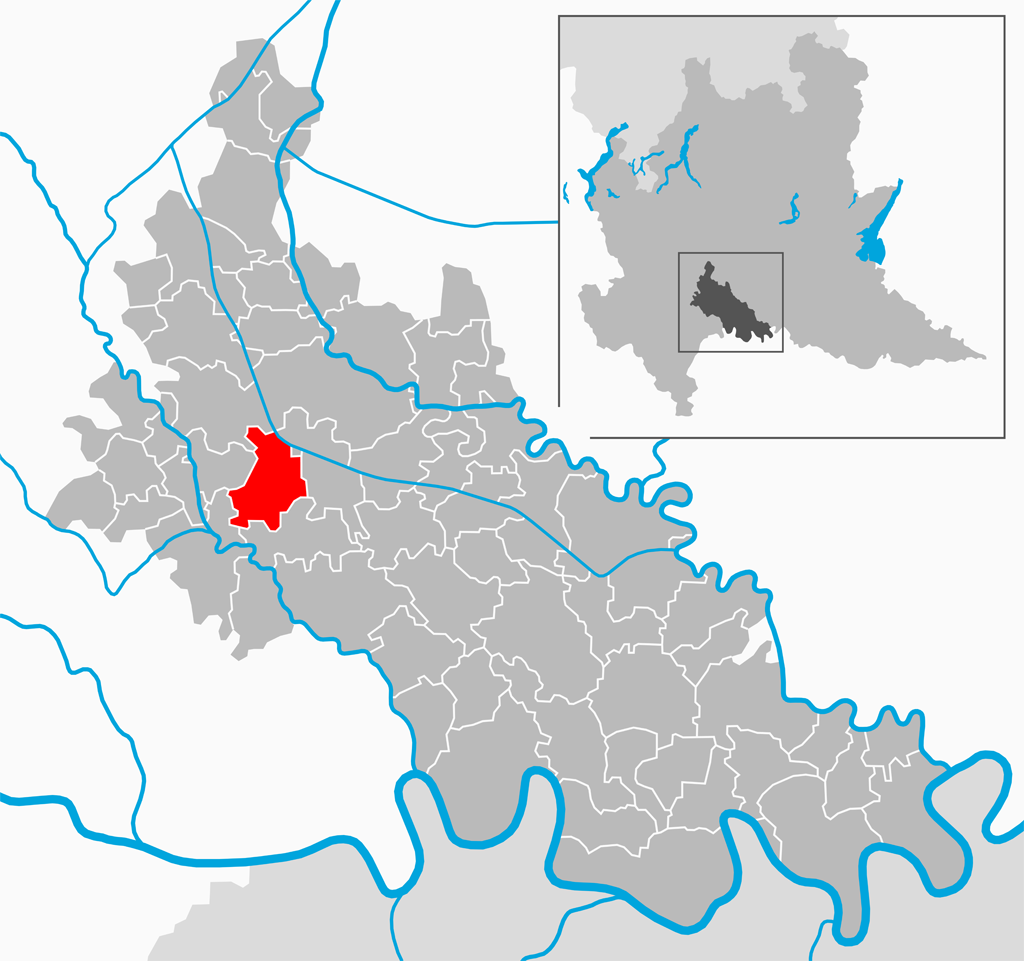

- Location within Italy Location within Lombardy
- Coordinates: 45°19′N 9°30′E
- Country: Italy
- Region: Lombardy
- Province: Lodi (LO)

Government
  - Mayor: Igor Stefano Guerciotti

Area
  - Total: 12.1 km^{2} (4.7 sq mi)
- Elevation: 76 m (249 ft)

Population (31 December 2016)
  - Total: 1,789
  - Density: 148/km^{2} (383/sq mi)
- Demonym: Pievesi
- Time zone: UTC+1 (CET)
  - Summer (DST): UTC+2 (CEST)
- Postal code: 26854
- Dialing code: 0371
- Website: Official website

Pieve Fissiraga (Lodigiano: Pieu) is a comune (municipality) in the Province of Lodi in the Italian region Lombardy, located about 30 kilometres (19 mi) southeast of Milan and about 10 kilometres (6 mi) south of Lodi.

Pieve Fissiraga borders the following municipalities: Lodi, Lodi Vecchio, Cornegliano Laudense, Borgo San Giovanni, Massalengo, Sant'Angelo Lodigiano, Villanova del Sillaro.
