= Ospedaletto Lodigiano =

- Comune
- Comune di Ospedaletto Lodigiano
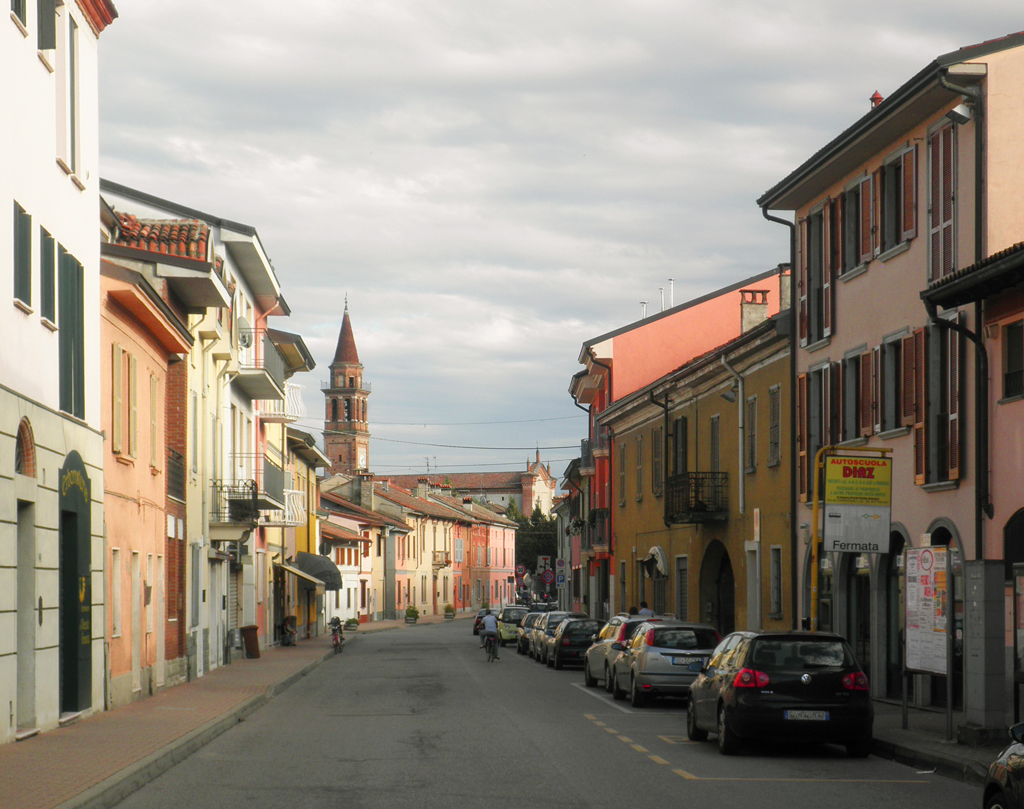

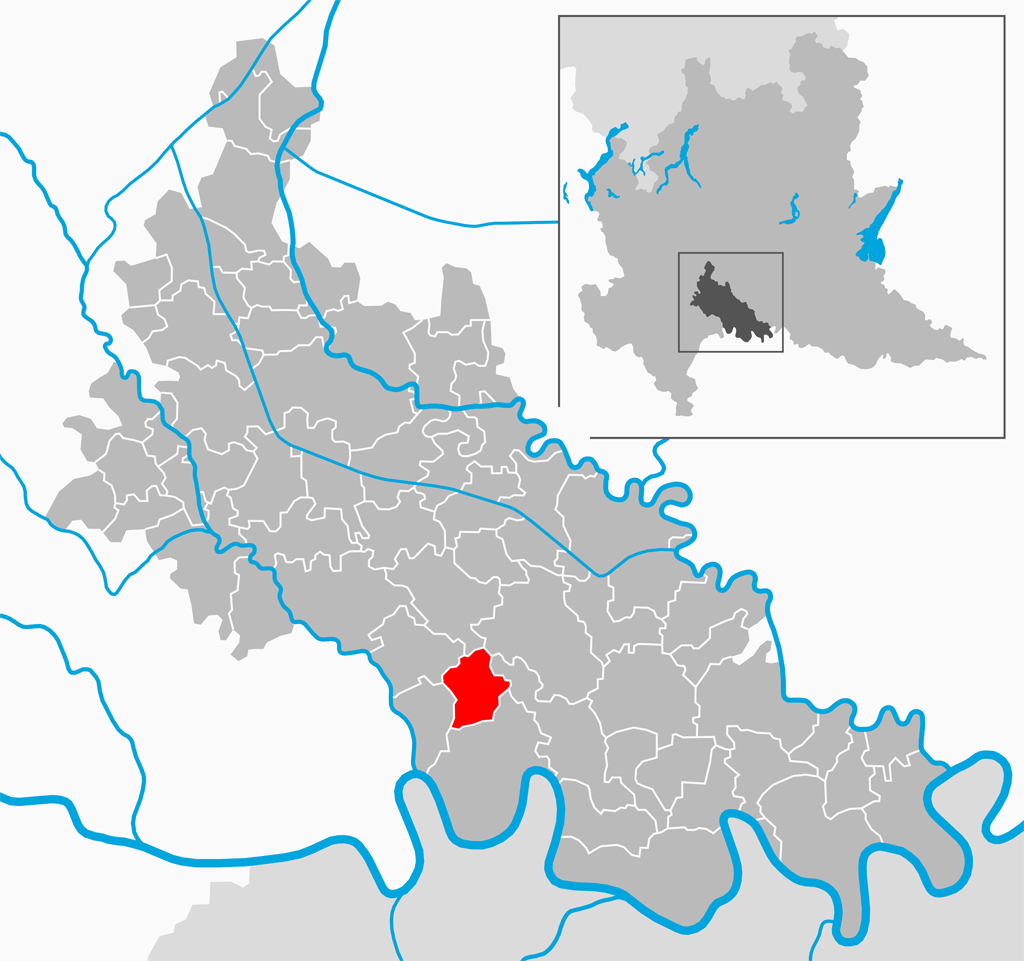

- Location within Italy Location within Lombardy
- Coordinates: 45°12′N 9°34′E
- Country: Italy
- Region: Lombardy
- Province: Lodi (LO)

Government
  - Mayor: Lucia Mizzi

Area
  - Total: 8.5 km^{2} (3.3 sq mi)
- Elevation: 64 m (210 ft)

Population (30 November 2012)
  - Total: 1,843
  - Density: 220/km^{2} (560/sq mi)
- Demonym: Ospedalettesi
- Time zone: UTC+1 (CET)
  - Summer (DST): UTC+2 (CEST)
- Postal code: 20080
- Dialing code: 0377
- Website: Official website

Ospedaletto Lodigiano (Lodigiano: Uspedalètt) is a comune (municipality) in the province of Lodi in the Italian region of Lombardy, located about 45 kilometres (28 mi) southeast of Milan and about 14 kilometres (9 mi) southeast of Lodi.

Ospedaletto Lodigiano borders the following municipalities: Brembio, Casalpusterlengo, Livraga, Somaglia, Orio Litta, Senna Lodigiana.

== See also ==
- Ad Rotas
