= Borghetto Lodigiano =

- Comune
- Comune di Borghetto Lodigiano
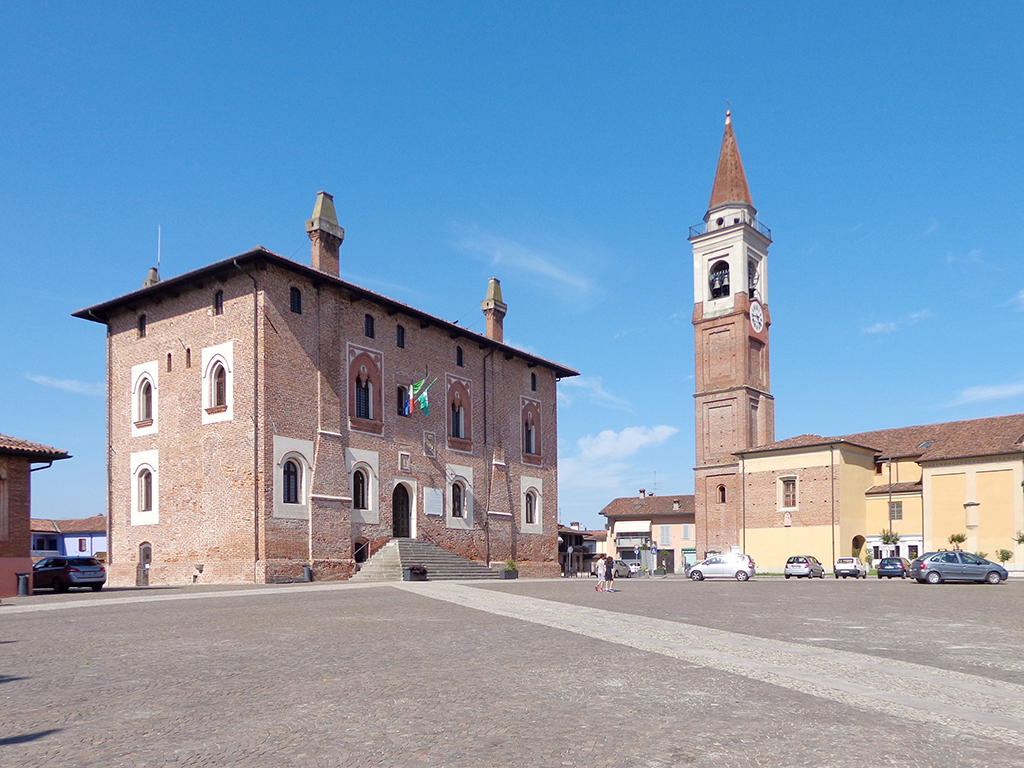
- View of Borghetto Lodigiano

- Coat of arms

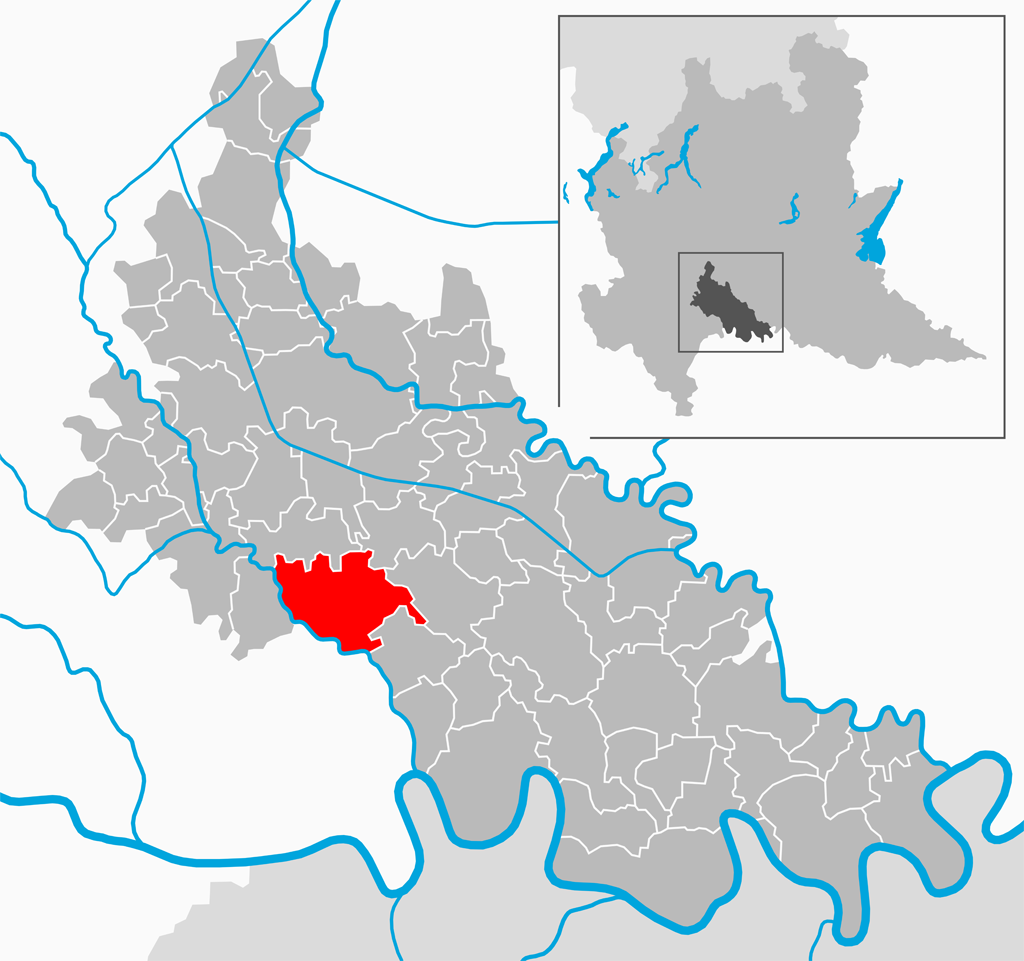

- Location within Italy Location within Lombardy
- Coordinates: 45°12′N 9°30′E
- Country: Italy
- Region: Lombardy
- Province: Lodi (LO)
- Frazioni: Casoni, Fornaci, Panigada, Pantiara, Proprio, Vigarolo

Government
  - Mayor: Giovanna Gargioni

Area
  - Total: 23.6 km^{2} (9.1 sq mi)
- Elevation: 68 m (223 ft)

Population (30 September 2017)
  - Total: 4,280
  - Density: 181/km^{2} (470/sq mi)
- Demonym: Borghettini
- Time zone: UTC+1 (CET)
  - Summer (DST): UTC+2 (CEST)
- Postal code: 26812
- Dialing code: 0371
- Website: Official website

Borghetto Lodigiano (Lodigiano: Burghét) is a comune (municipality) in the Province of Lodi in the Italian region Lombardy, located about 40 kilometres (25 mi) southeast of Milan and about 11 kilometres (7 mi) south of Lodi. It is located on the left slope of the Lambro river.

Borghetto Lodigiano borders the following municipalities: Ossago Lodigiano, Villanova del Sillaro, Brembio, Graffignana, Livraga, San Colombano al Lambro. The economy is mostly based on agriculture and on production of aluminium.
