= Orio Litta =

- Comune
- Comune di Orio Litta
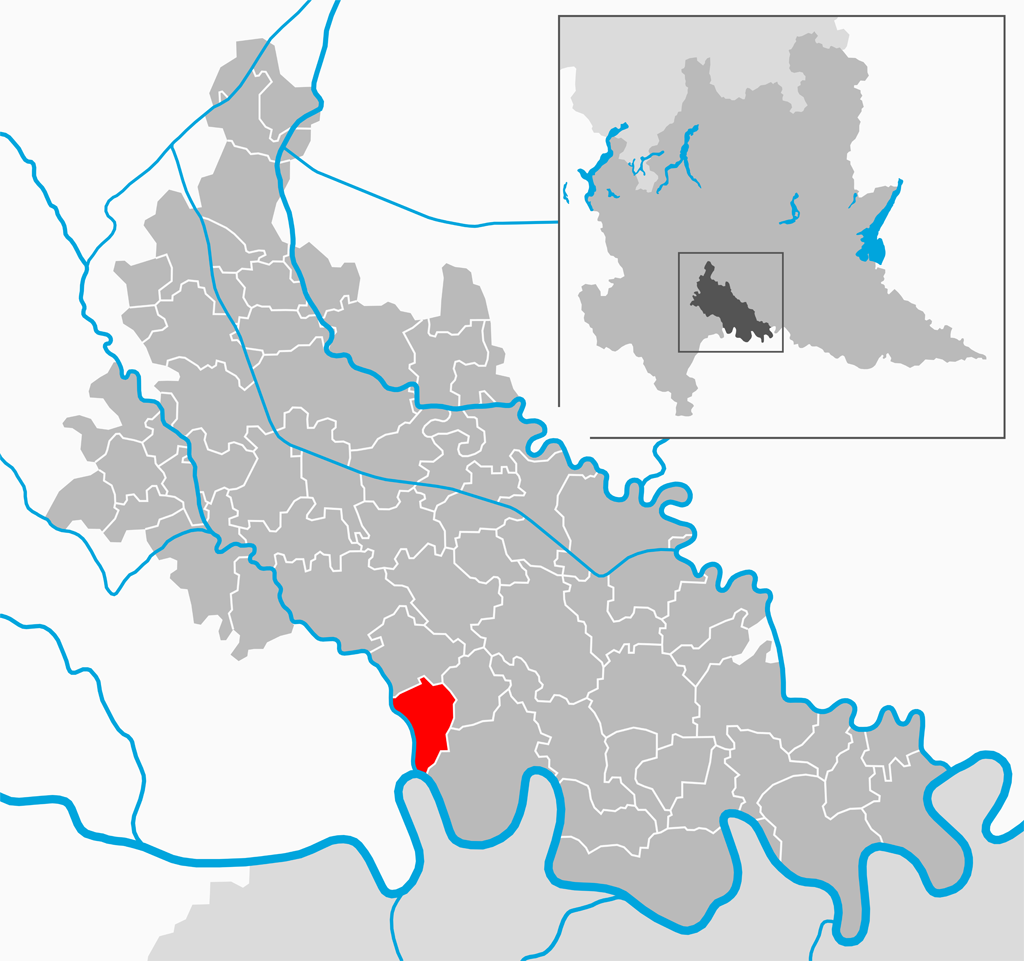

- Location within Italy Location within Lombardy
- Coordinates: 45°12′N 9°34′E
- Country: Italy
- Region: Lombardy
- Province: Province of Lodi (LO)

Area
  - Total: 9.9 km^{2} (3.8 sq mi)

Population (Dec. 2004)
  - Total: 1,982
  - Density: 200/km^{2} (520/sq mi)
- Time zone: UTC+1 (CET)
  - Summer (DST): UTC+2 (CEST)
- Postal code: 20080
- Dialing code: 0377
- Website: Official website

Orio Litta (Lodigiano: Vori) is a comune (municipality) in the Province of Lodi in the Italian region Lombardy, located about 45 kilometres (28 mi) southeast of Milan and about 14 kilometres (9 mi) southeast of Lodi. As of 31 December 2004, it had a population of 1,982 and an area of 9.9 square kilometres (3.8 mi^{2}).

Orio Litta borders the following municipalities: Livraga, San Colombano al Lambro, Ospedaletto Lodigiano, Senna Lodigiana, Chignolo Po, Calendasco, Monticelli Pavese.

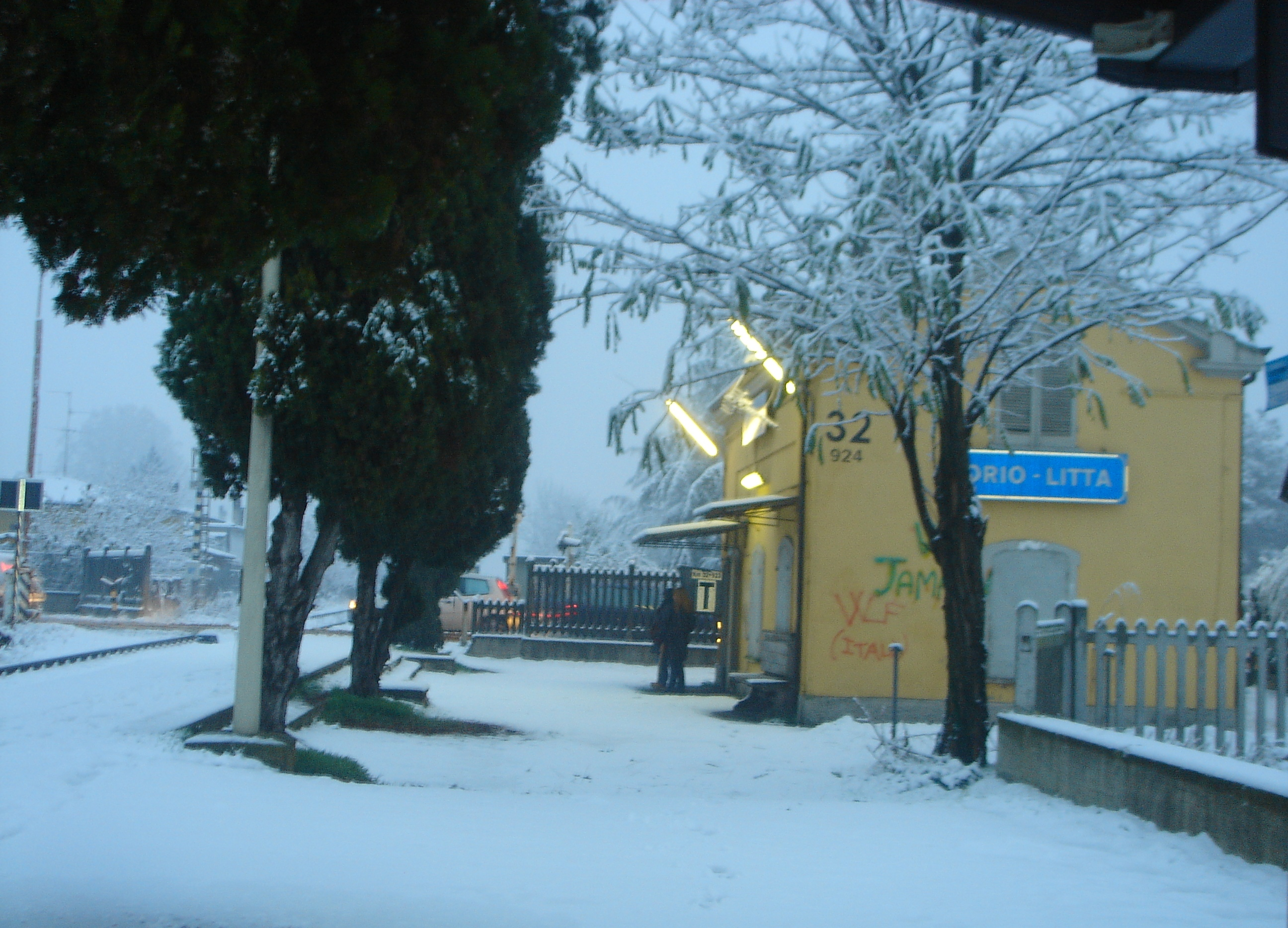
Station Orio Litta snowy at Christmas time

== 1765 wolf attack ==
On November 21, 1765 a rabid wolf attacked the residents of Orio Litta, biting sixteen people before being killed. Fourteen of the victims died after being taken to the Lodi hospital.

== Demographic evolution ==
Historical population

Year	Pop.	±%
1861	1,915	—
1871	2,024	+5.7%
1881	1,979	−2.2%
1901	1,925	−2.7%
1911	1,866	−3.1%

Year	Pop.	±%
1921	1,756	−5.9%
1931	1,821	+3.7%
1936	1,672	−8.2%
1951	1,684	+0.7%
1961	1,511	−10.3%

Year	Pop.	±%
1971	1,679	+11.1%
1981	1,743	+3.8%
1991	1,823	+4.6%
2001	1,908	+4.7%

Source: Data from ISTAT
