= Mairago =

Mairago Mairàgh (Lombard)
- Comune
- Comune di Mairago
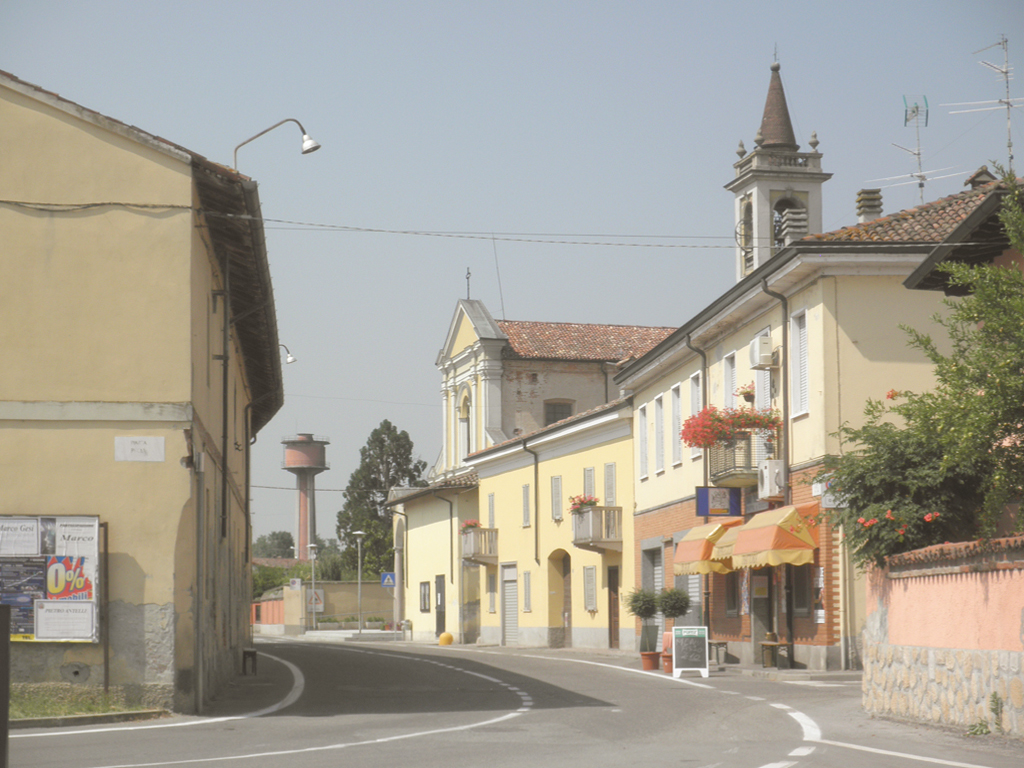

- Coat of arms

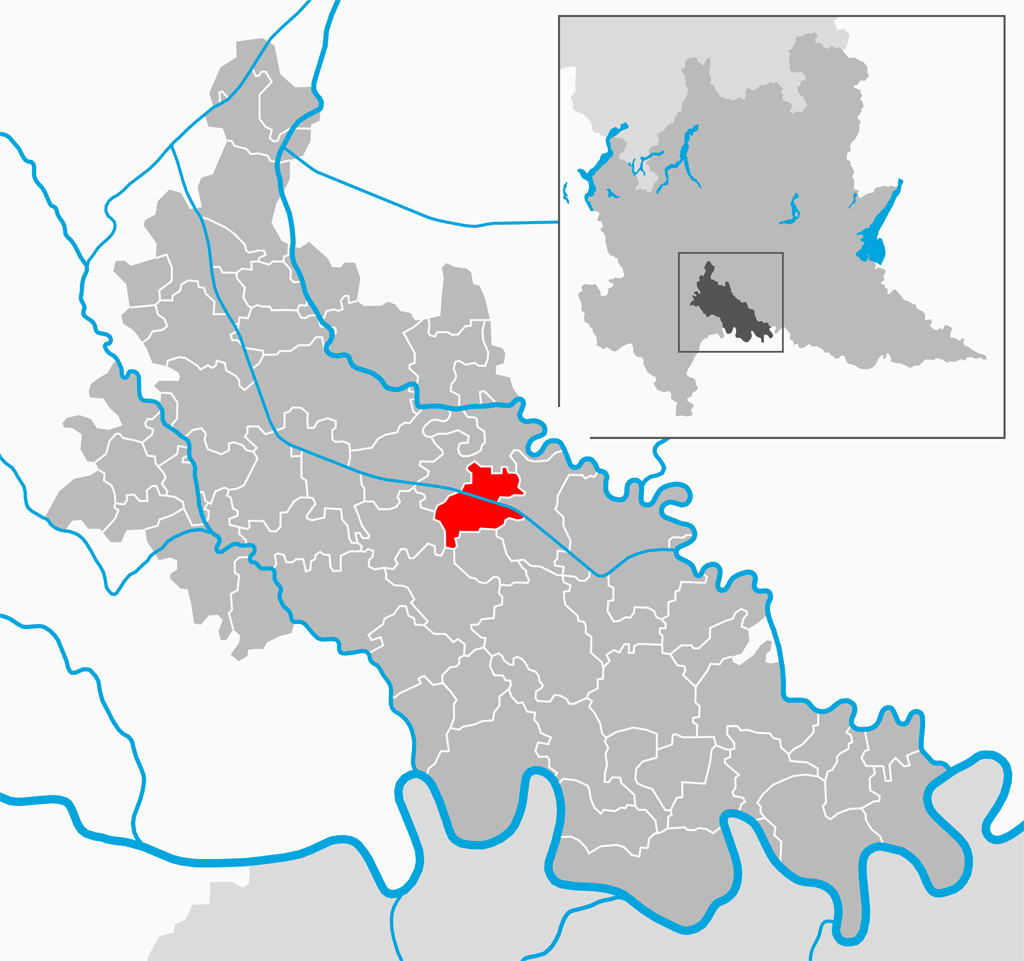

- Location within Italy Location within Lombardy
- Coordinates: 45°18′N 9°35′E
- Country: Italy
- Region: Lombardy
- Province: Lodi (LO)
- Frazioni: Basiasco

Government
  - Mayor: Antonio Braghieri

Area
  - Total: 11.4 km^{2} (4.4 sq mi)
- Elevation: 69 m (226 ft)

Population (30 September 2017)
  - Total: 1,383
  - Density: 121/km^{2} (314/sq mi)
- Demonym: Mairaghini
- Time zone: UTC+1 (CET)
  - Summer (DST): UTC+2 (CEST)
- Postal code: 26825
- Dialing code: 0371

Mairago (Lodigiano: Mairàgh) is a comune (municipality) in the Province of Lodi in the Italian region Lombardy, located about 40 kilometres (25 mi) southeast of Milan and about 7 kilometres (4 mi) southeast of Lodi.

Mairago borders the following municipalities: Cavenago d'Adda, Turano Lodigiano, Ossago Lodigiano, Secugnago, Brembio.

== Economy ==
The main economical activity is the cultivation of maize, barley and, to a lesser extent, wheat. Animal husbandry is also widespread, including beekeeping. Exploitation of methane reservoirs by Agip is now virtually ended.

== Twin towns ==
- Dancé, France
