= Villanova del Sillaro =

Villanova del Sillaro Vilanöva del Silar (Lombard)
- Comune
- Comune di Villanova del Sillaro
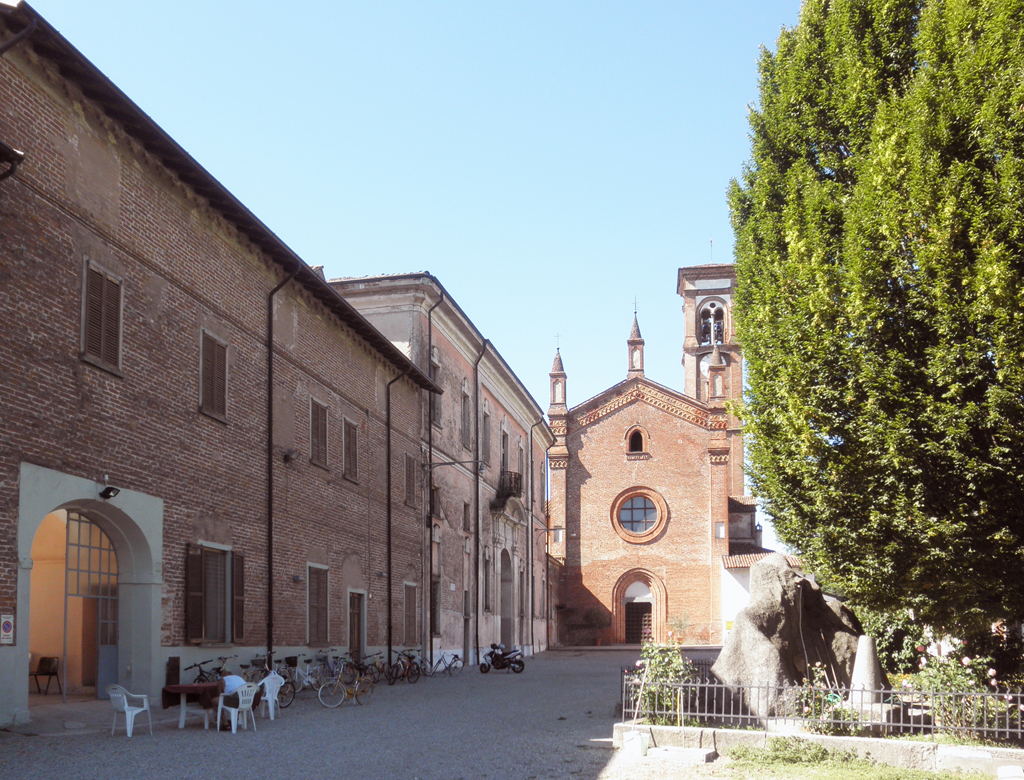

- Coat of arms

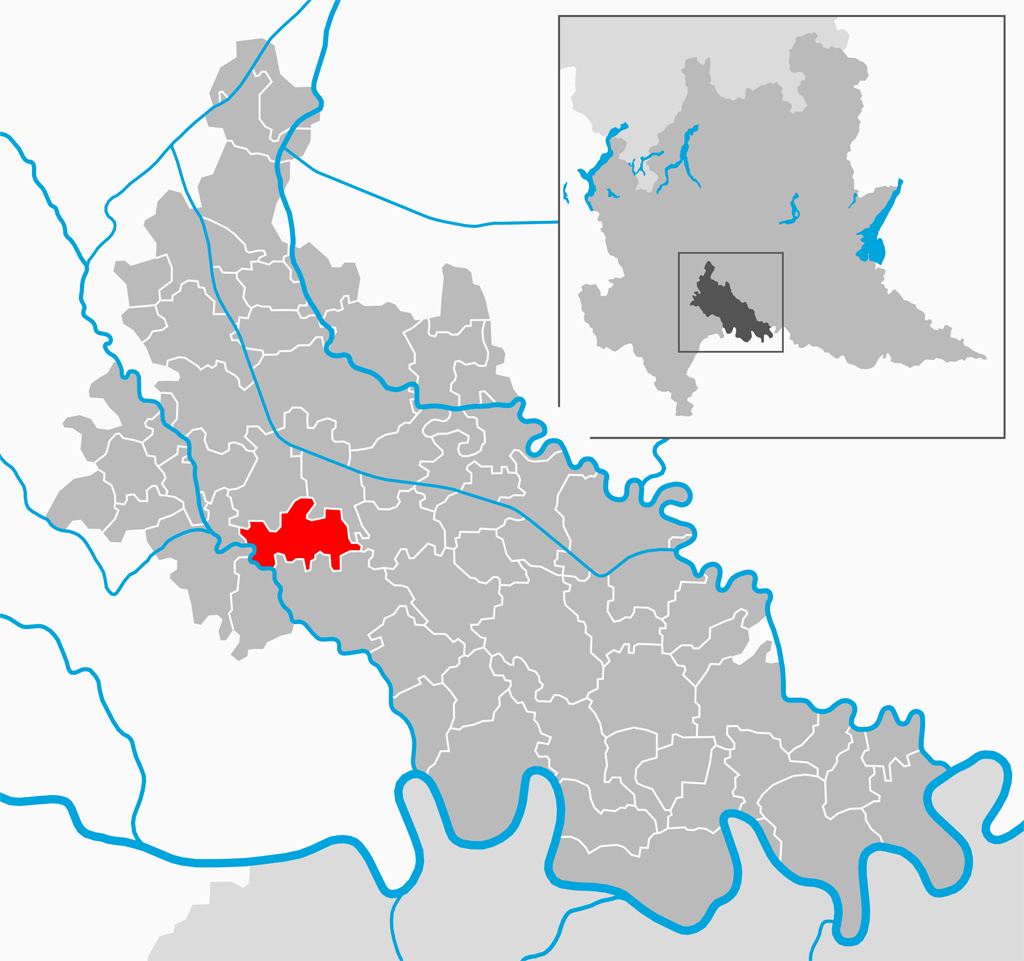

- Location within Italy Location within Lombardy
- Coordinates: 45°14′N 9°29′E
- Country: Italy
- Region: Lombardy
- Province: Lodi (LO)

Government
  - Mayor: Moreno Oldani

Area
  - Total: 13.5 km^{2} (5.2 sq mi)
- Elevation: 69 m (226 ft)

Population (30 September 2015)
  - Total: 1,831
  - Density: 136/km^{2} (351/sq mi)
- Demonym: Villanovesi
- Time zone: UTC+1 (CET)
  - Summer (DST): UTC+2 (CEST)
- Postal code: 26818
- Dialing code: 0371
- Website: Official website

Villanova del Sillaro (Lodigiano: Vilanöva del Silar) is a comune (municipality) in the Province of Lodi in the Italian region Lombardy, located about 35 kilometres (22 mi) southeast of Milan and about 9 kilometres (6 mi) south of Lodi.

Villanova del Sillaro borders the following municipalities: Pieve Fissiraga, Massalengo, Sant'Angelo Lodigiano, Ossago Lodigiano, Borghetto Lodigiano, Graffignana.
