= Bruno Arcari (footballer) =

Italian footballer and coach (1915-2004)

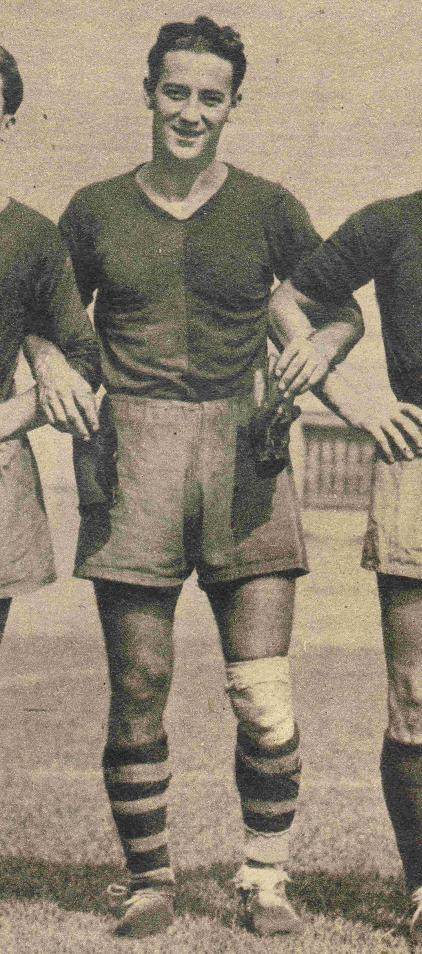

Personal information
- Date of birth: 15 November 1915
- Place of birth: Casalpusterlengo, Italy
- Date of death: 10 December 2004 (aged 89)
- Place of death: Varese, Italy
- Height: 1.75 m (5 ft 9 in)
- Position: Forward

Senior career*
Years	Team	Apps	(Gls)
1932–1933	Codogno		
1933–1939	Livorno	126	(53)
1939–1940	Genova 1893	21	(11)
1940–1941	Milan	24	(5)
1941–1942	Bologna	19	(4)
1942–1943	Brescia	8	(2)
1943–1944	Cremonese	14	(2)
1944–1945	Milan	19	(8)
1945–1948	Bologna	89	(19)
1948–1949	Reggiana	22	(6)
1949–1952	ArsenalTaranto	62	(6)
1952–1953	Piacenza	6	(0)
1953–1954	Gallaratese		

International career
1949	Italy	1	(0)

Managerial career
- 1954–1955: Milan (assistant)
- Monza
- 1960–1961: Messina
- 1961–1962: Catanzaro
- 1962–1963: Lucchese
- 1964–1965: Parma
- 1966–1969: Varese
- 1969–1971: Piacenza
- * Club domestic league appearances and goals

Bruno Arcari (Italian pronunciation: [ˈbruːno arˈkaːri]; 15 November 1915 – 10 December 2004) was an Italian football player and coach, who played as a forward.

== Club career ==
Arcari played for nine seasons (197 games, 42 goals) in the Serie A for A.S. Livorno Calcio, Genova 1893, Milan, and Bologna F.C. 1909.

== International career ==
Arcari played his only game for the Italy national team on 3 March 1940, in a 1–1 draw against Switzerland.

== Personal life ==
Burno's older brothers Carlo Arcari, Angelo Arcari and Pietro Arcari all played football professionally. To distinguish them, Carlo was referred to as Arcari I, Angelo as Arcari II, Pietro as Arcari III and Bruno as Arcari IV.
