= Santi Bartolomeo e Martino, Casalpusterlengo =

Church in Casalpusterlengo, Italy

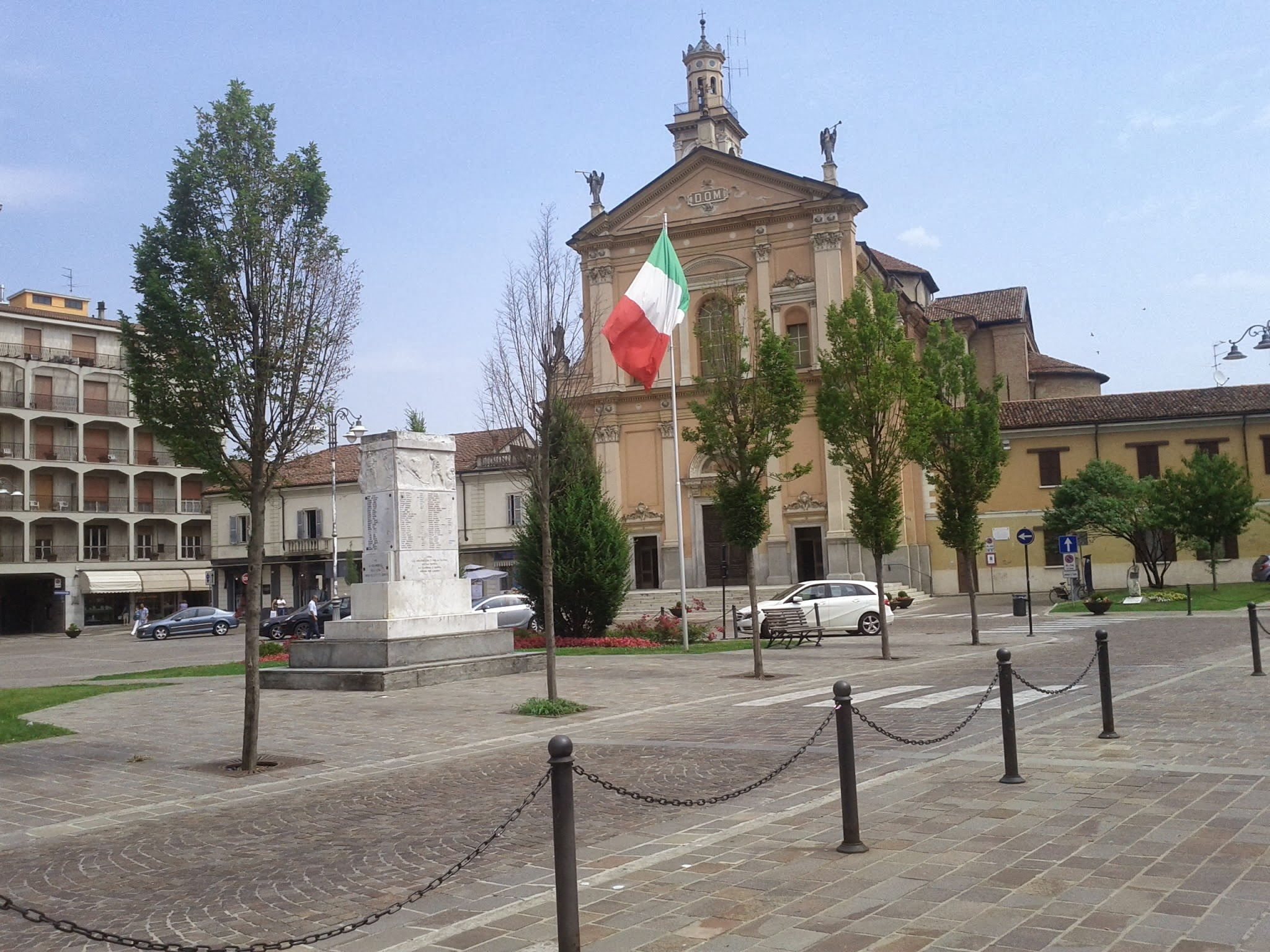
Casalpusterlengo (LO) - piazza del Popolo - 01.jpg

The church of Santi Bartolomeo e Martino is a Baroque-style, Roman Catholic church in Casalpusterlengo, province of Lodi, region of Lombardy, Italy.

Originally built in the 14th century, the church was rebuilt in an early Baroque style during 1602 to circa 1610. Restoration of the interiors began in 1999.
