= Brembio =

Brembio Brémbi (Lombard)
- Comune
- Comune di Brembio
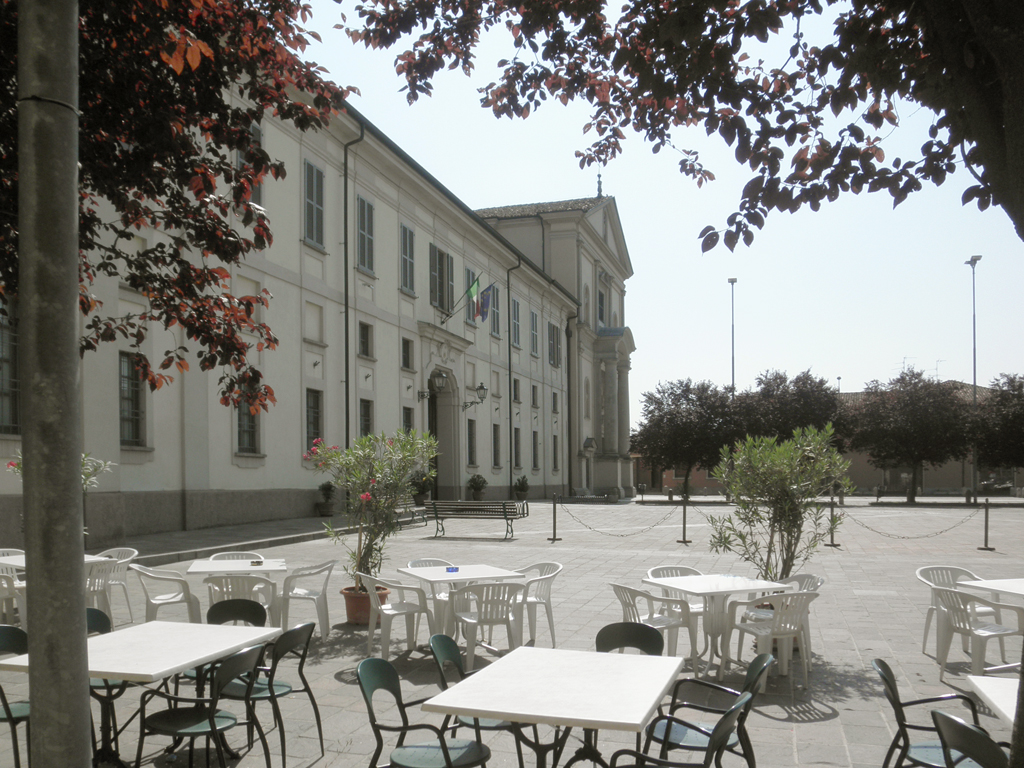
- The central square

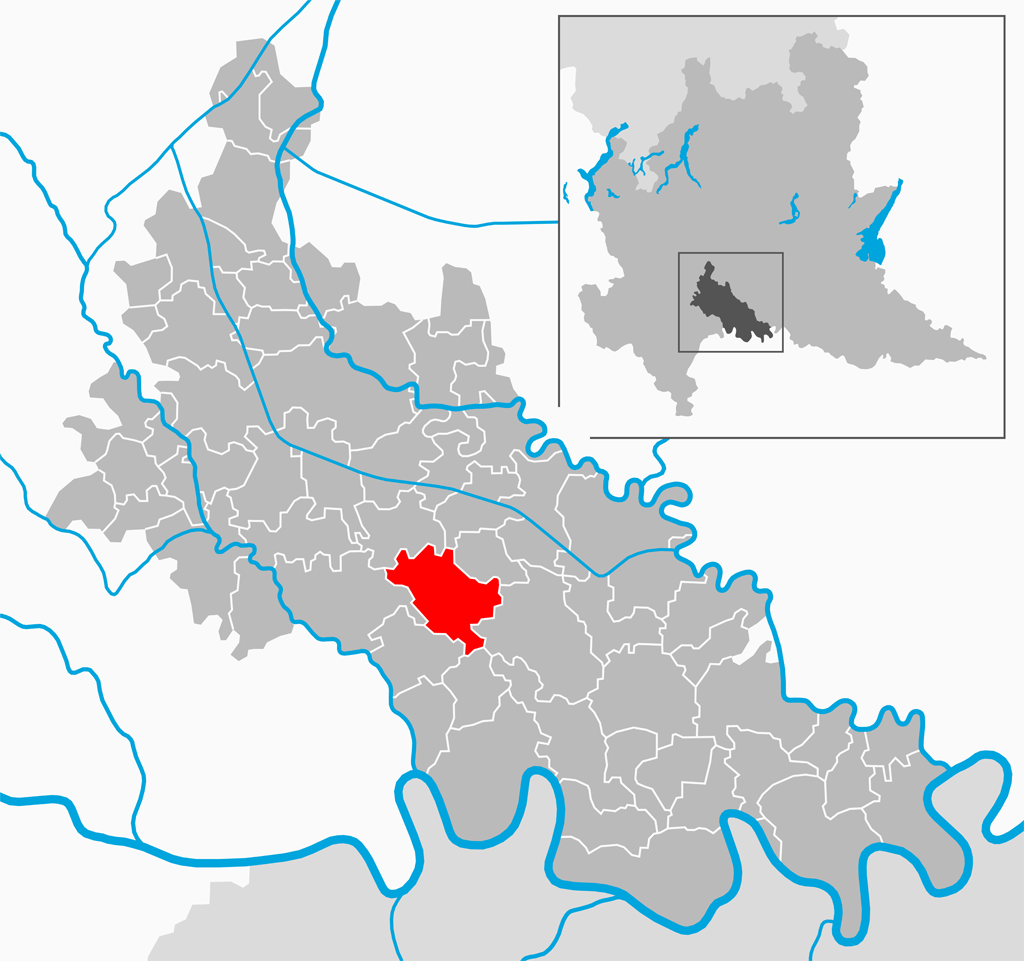

- Location within Italy Location within Lombardy
- Coordinates: 45°12′N 9°34′E
- Country: Italy
- Region: Lombardy
- Province: Lodi (LO)
- Frazioni: Ca' de Folli, Ca' del Parto, Monasterolo

Government
  - Mayor: Giancarlo Rando

Area
  - Total: 16.9 km^{2} (6.5 sq mi)
- Elevation: 67 m (220 ft)

Population (30 April 2017)
  - Total: 2,645
  - Density: 157/km^{2} (405/sq mi)
- Demonym: Brembiesi
- Time zone: UTC+1 (CET)
  - Summer (DST): UTC+2 (CEST)
- Postal code: 26822
- Dialing code: 0377
- Website: Official website

Brembio (Lodigiano: Brémbi) is a comune (municipality) in the Province of Lodi in the Italian region Lombardy, located about 45 kilometres (28 mi) southeast of Milan and about 14 kilometres (8.7 mi) southeast of Lodi. Its inhabitants are called "Brembiesi".

Brembio borders the following municipalities: Mairago, Ossago Lodigiano, Secugnago, Borghetto Lodigiano, Casalpusterlengo, Livraga, Ospedaletto Lodigiano.

== Economy ==
Some industries work in the mechanic and alimentary sectors. There are also numerous agricultural activities, often at a familiar level.

== History ==
Of Roman origin, it belonged to the Monastery of "San Pietro in Ciel d'Oro" in Pavia (725). Then, it belonged to the church of "Santa Maria" in Lodi and, later, it became a fief of various Lodi families.

During the Napoleonic Era (1809-16), the municipality of Brembio was attached to "Cà del Bosco". With the constitution of the Kingdom of Lombardy-Veneto, Brembio was aggregated permanently in 1837.

== Twin towns ==
Brembio is twinned with:

- Saint-Christo-en-Jarez, France, since 2004
