= Livraga =

- Comune
- Comune di Livraga
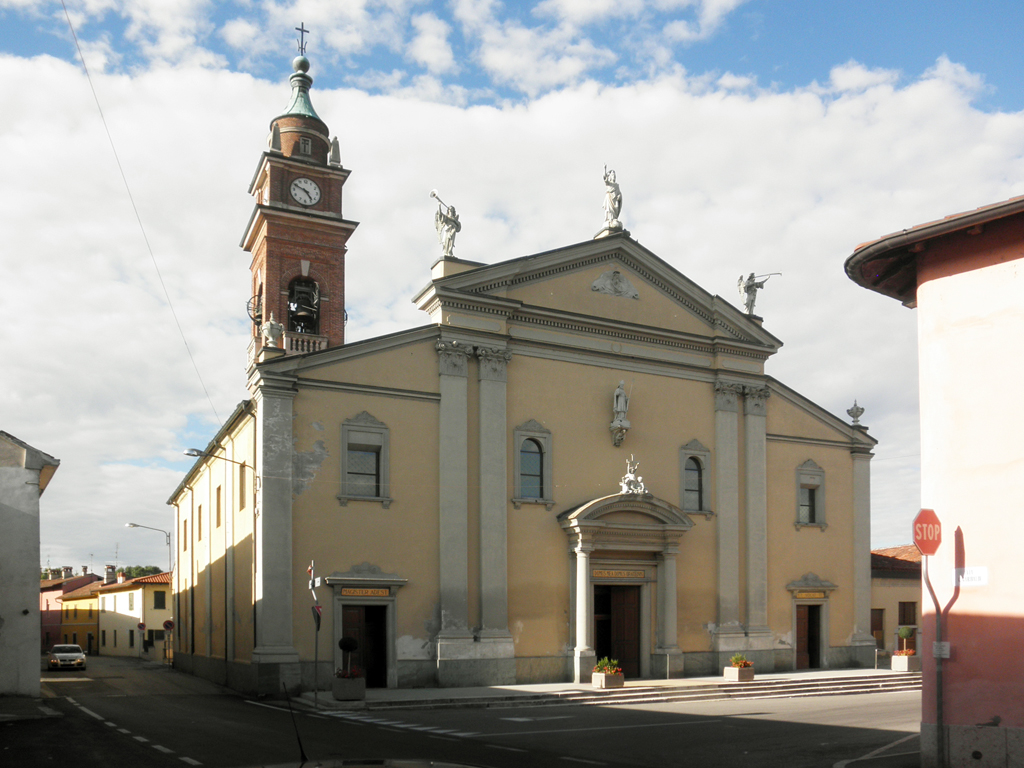

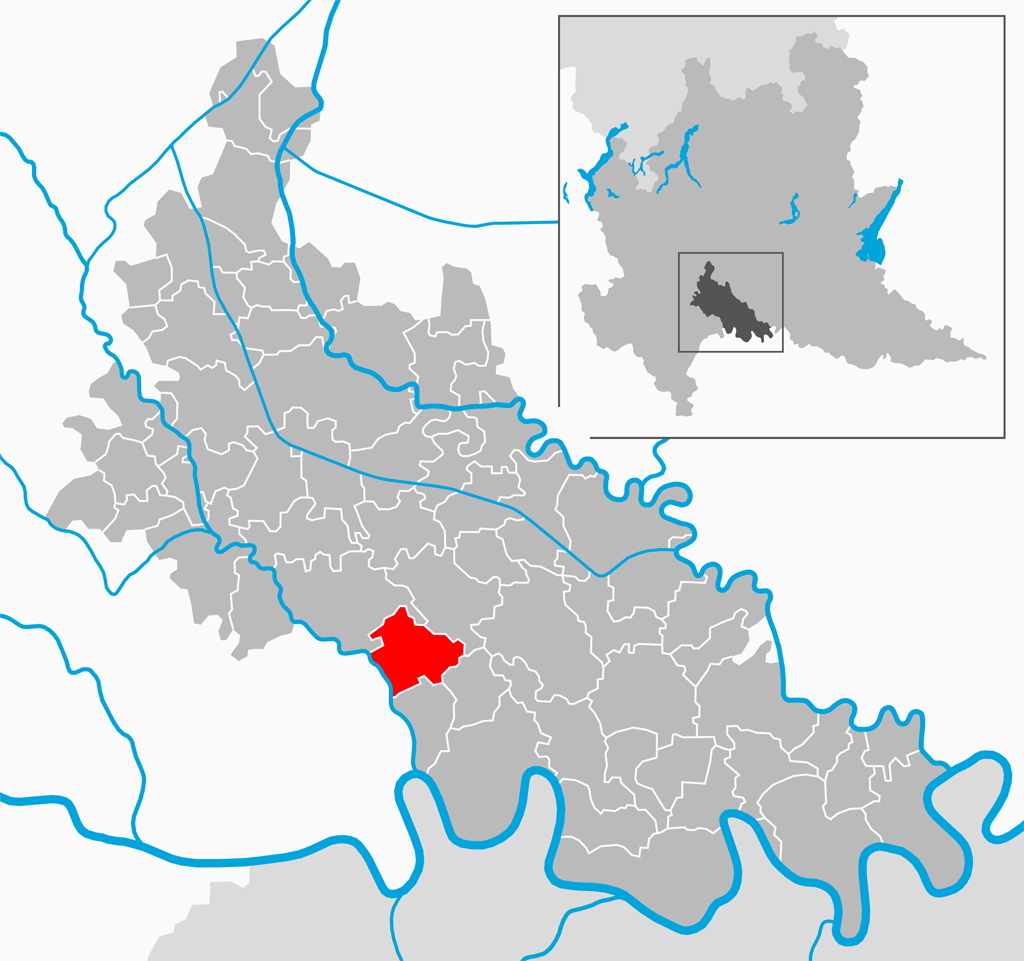

- Location within Italy Location within Lombardy
- Coordinates: 45°12′N 9°34′E
- Country: Italy
- Region: Lombardy
- Province: Province of Lodi (LO)

Area
  - Total: 12.2 km^{2} (4.7 sq mi)

Population (Dec. 2004)
  - Total: 2,589
  - Density: 212/km^{2} (550/sq mi)
- Time zone: UTC+1 (CET)
  - Summer (DST): UTC+2 (CEST)
- Postal code: 26814
- Dialing code: 0377
- Website: Official website

Livraga is a comune (municipality) in the Province of Lodi in the Italian region Lombardy, located about 45 kilometres (28 mi) southeast of Milan and about 14 kilometres (9 mi) southeast of Lodi. As of 31 December 2004, it had a population of 2,589 and an area of 12.2 square kilometres (4.7 mi^{2}).

Livraga borders the following municipalities: Brembio, Borghetto Lodigiano, San Colombano al Lambro, Ospedaletto Lodigiano, Orio Litta.

== Demographic evolution ==
Historical population

| Year | Pop. | ±% |
|---|---|---|
| 1861 | 3,374 | — |
| 1871 | 3,429 | +1.6% |
| 1881 | 3,389 | −1.2% |
| 1901 | 3,465 | +2.2% |
| 1911 | 3,404 | −1.8% |

| Year | Pop. | ±% |
|---|---|---|
| 1921 | 3,419 | +0.4% |
| 1931 | 3,234 | −5.4% |
| 1936 | 3,143 | −2.8% |
| 1951 | 3,263 | +3.8% |
| 1961 | 3,025 | −7.3% |

| Year | Pop. | ±% |
|---|---|---|
| 1971 | 2,697 | −10.8% |
| 1981 | 2,448 | −9.2% |
| 1991 | 2,449 | +0.0% |
| 2001 | 2,508 | +2.4% |

Source: Data from ISTAT
