= Secugnago =

Secugnago Scügnài (Lombard)
- Comune
- Comune di Secugnago
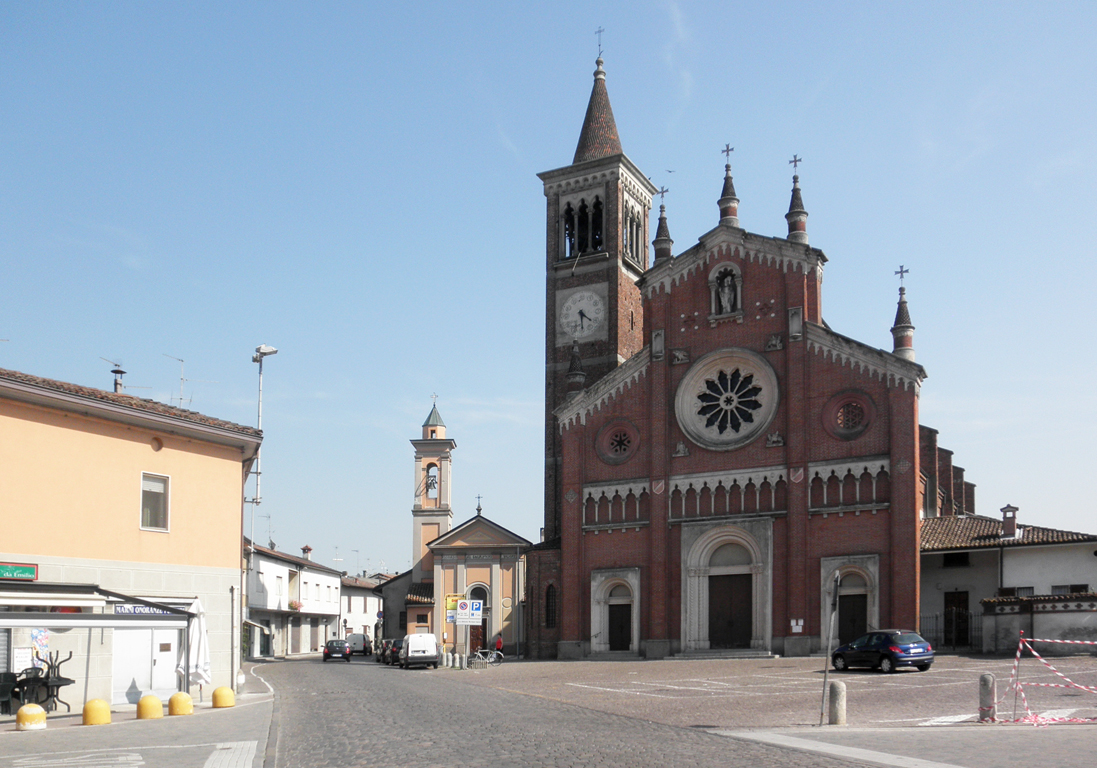

- Coat of arms

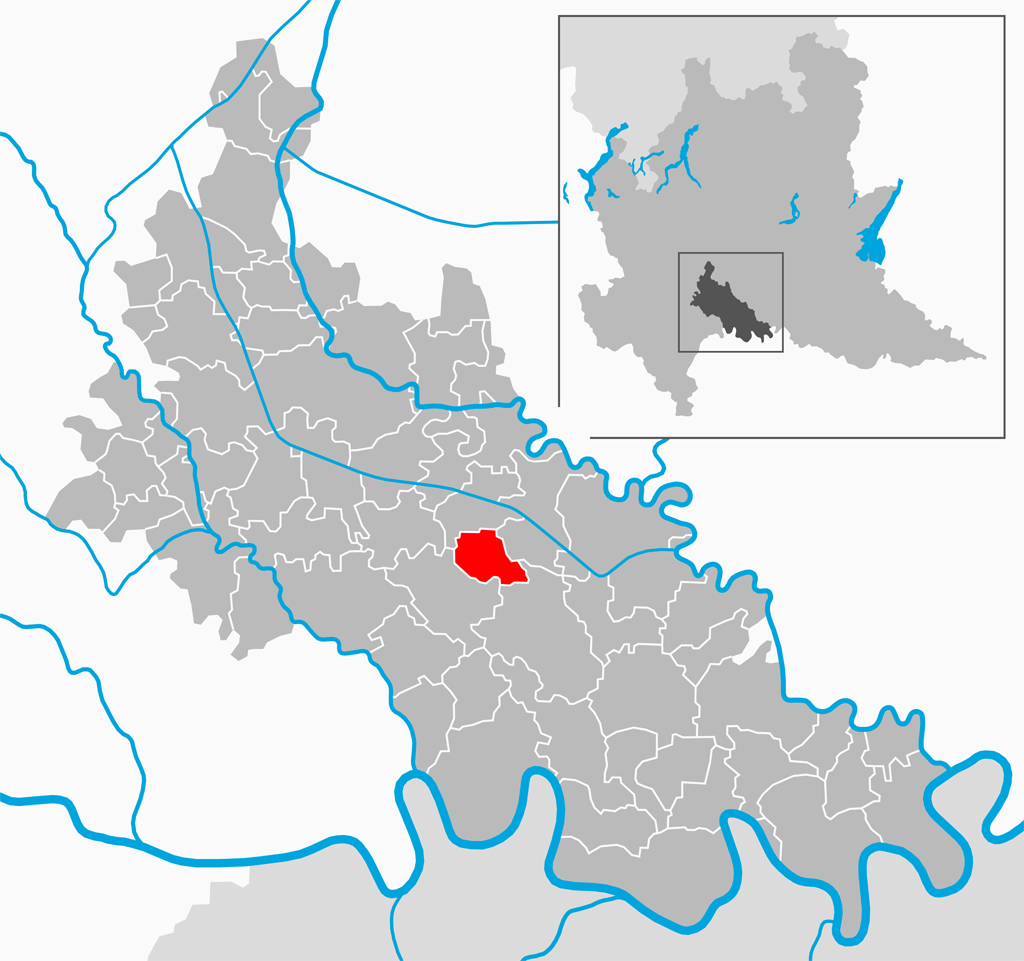

- Location within Italy Location within Lombardy
- Coordinates: 45°13′N 9°35′E
- Country: Italy
- Region: Lombardy
- Province: Province of Lodi (LO)

Area
  - Total: 6.7 km^{2} (2.6 sq mi)

Population (Dec. 2004)
  - Total: 1,801
  - Density: 270/km^{2} (700/sq mi)
- Time zone: UTC+1 (CET)
  - Summer (DST): UTC+2 (CEST)
- Postal code: 26842
- Dialing code: 0377
- Website: Official website

Secugnago (Lodigiano: Scügnài) is a comune (municipality) in the Province of Lodi in the Italian region Lombardy, located about 45 kilometres (28 mi) southeast of Milan and about 13 kilometres (8.1 mi) southeast of Lodi. As of 31 December 2004, it had a population of 1,801 and an area of 6.7 square kilometres (2.6 mi^{2}).

Secugnago borders the following municipalities: Turano Lodigiano, Mairago, Brembio, Casalpusterlengo.

== Demographic evolution ==
Historical population

| Year | Pop. | ±% |
|---|---|---|
| 1861 | 1,499 | — |
| 1871 | 1,624 | +8.3% |
| 1881 | 1,579 | −2.8% |
| 1901 | 1,691 | +7.1% |
| 1911 | 1,691 | +0.0% |

| Year | Pop. | ±% |
|---|---|---|
| 1921 | 1,673 | −1.1% |
| 1931 | 1,644 | −1.7% |
| 1936 | 1,750 | +6.4% |
| 1951 | 1,790 | +2.3% |
| 1961 | 1,823 | +1.8% |

| Year | Pop. | ±% |
|---|---|---|
| 1971 | 1,664 | −8.7% |
| 1981 | 1,588 | −4.6% |
| 1991 | 1,597 | +0.6% |
| 2001 | 1,742 | +9.1% |

Source: Data from ISTAT
