= San Martino in Strada =

Comune in Lombardy, Italy

- Comune
- Comune di San Martino in Strada
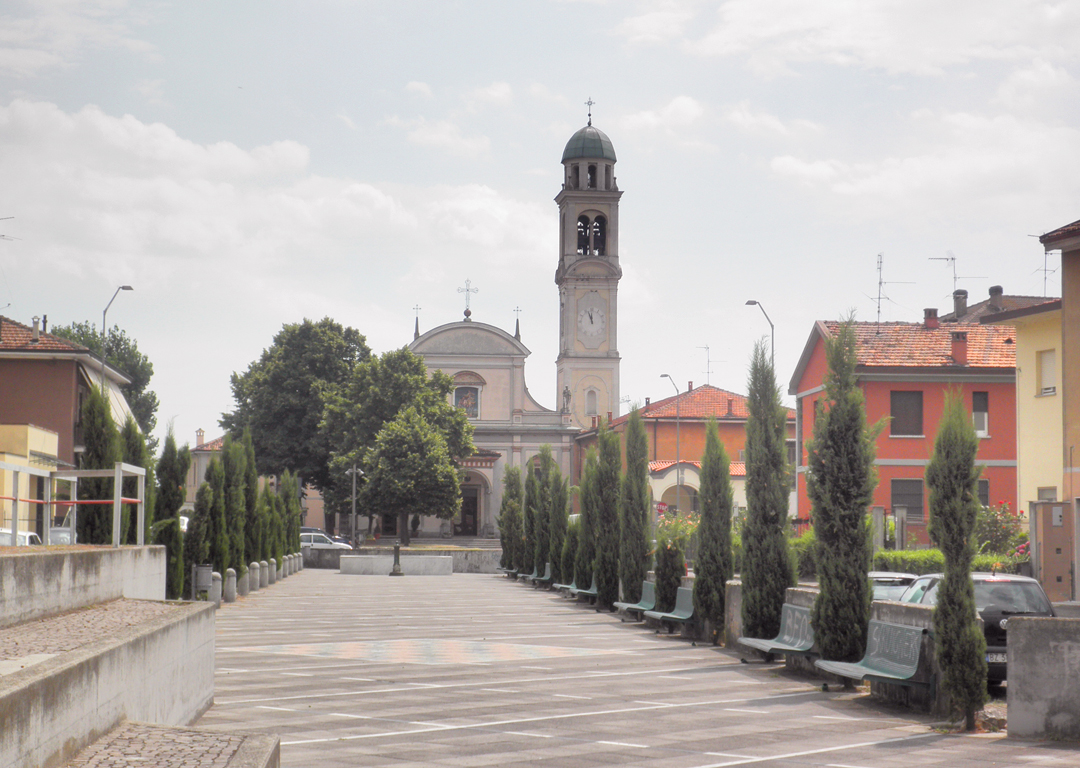

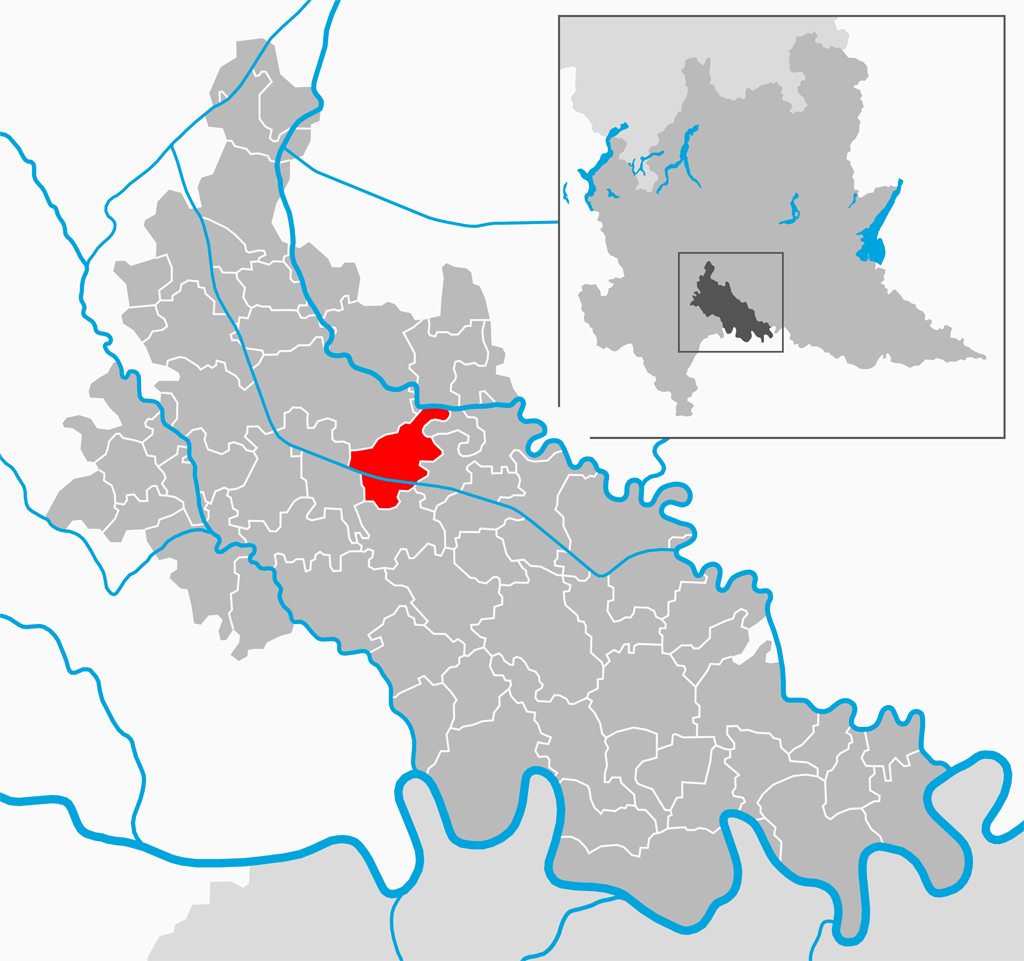

- Location within Italy Location within Lombardy
- Coordinates: 45°18′N 9°35′E
- Country: Italy
- Region: Lombardy
- Province: Lodi (LO)
- Frazioni: Ca' de' Bolli, Ca' del Conte, Pompola, Sesto Pergola

Government
  - Mayor: Luca Marini

Area
  - Total: 13.1 km^{2} (5.1 sq mi)
- Elevation: 73 m (240 ft)

Population (1 January 2017)
  - Total: 3,681
  - Density: 281/km^{2} (728/sq mi)
- Demonym: Sammartinesi
- Time zone: UTC+1 (CET)
  - Summer (DST): UTC+2 (CEST)
- Postal code: 26817
- Dialing code: 0371
- Website: Official website

San Martino in Strada (Lodigiano: San Martin) is a comune (municipality) in the Province of Lodi in the Italian region Lombardy, located about 40 kilometres (25 mi) southeast of Milan and about 7 kilometres (4 mi) southeast of Lodi.

San Martino in Strada borders the following municipalities: Lodi, Corte Palasio, Cavenago d'Adda, Cornegliano Laudense, Massalengo, Ossago Lodigiano.
