= Cornegliano Laudense =

- Comune
- Comune di Cornegliano Laudense
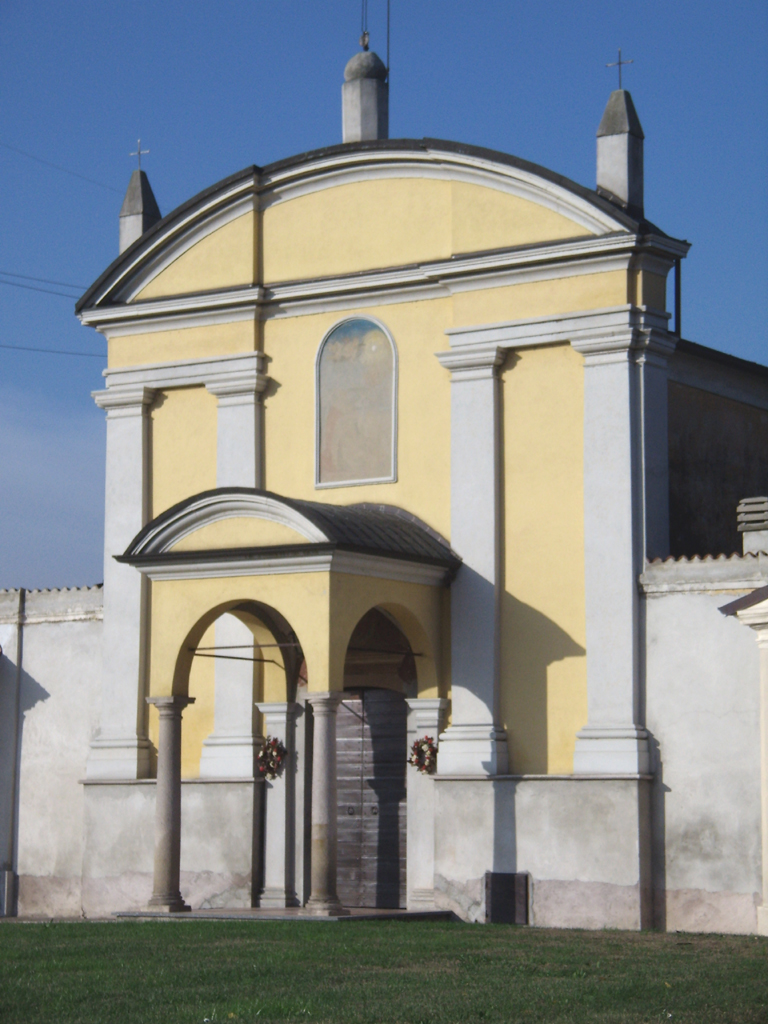

- Coat of arms

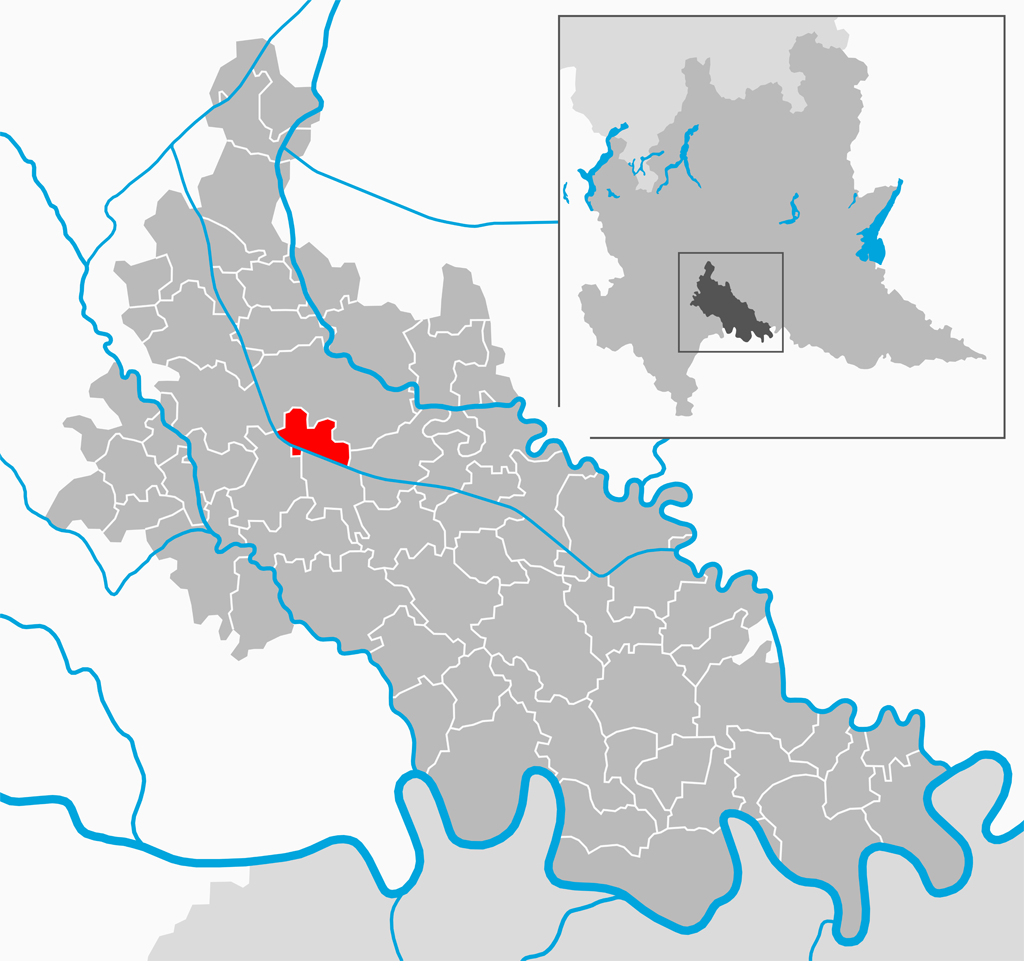

- Location within Italy Location within Lombardy
- Coordinates: 45°18′N 9°24′E
- Country: Italy
- Region: Lombardy
- Province: Lodi (LO)
- Frazioni: Muzza

Government
  - Mayor: Matteo Lacchini

Area
  - Total: 5.7 km^{2} (2.2 sq mi)
- Elevation: 78 m (256 ft)

Population (30 June 2017)
  - Total: 2,917
  - Density: 510/km^{2} (1,300/sq mi)
- Demonym: Corneglianesi
- Time zone: UTC+1 (CET)
  - Summer (DST): UTC+2 (CEST)
- Postal code: 26854
- Dialing code: 0371
- Website: Official website

Cornegliano Laudense (Lodigiano: Curneiàan) is a comune (municipality) in the Province of Lodi in the Italian region Lombardy, located about 25 kilometres (16 mi) southeast of Milan and about 8 kilometres (5 mi) west of Lodi.

Cornegliano Laudense borders the following municipalities: Lodi, Lodi Vecchio, San Martino in Strada, Pieve Fissiraga, Massalengo.
