= Terranova dei Passerini =

- Comune
- Comune di Terranova dei Passerini
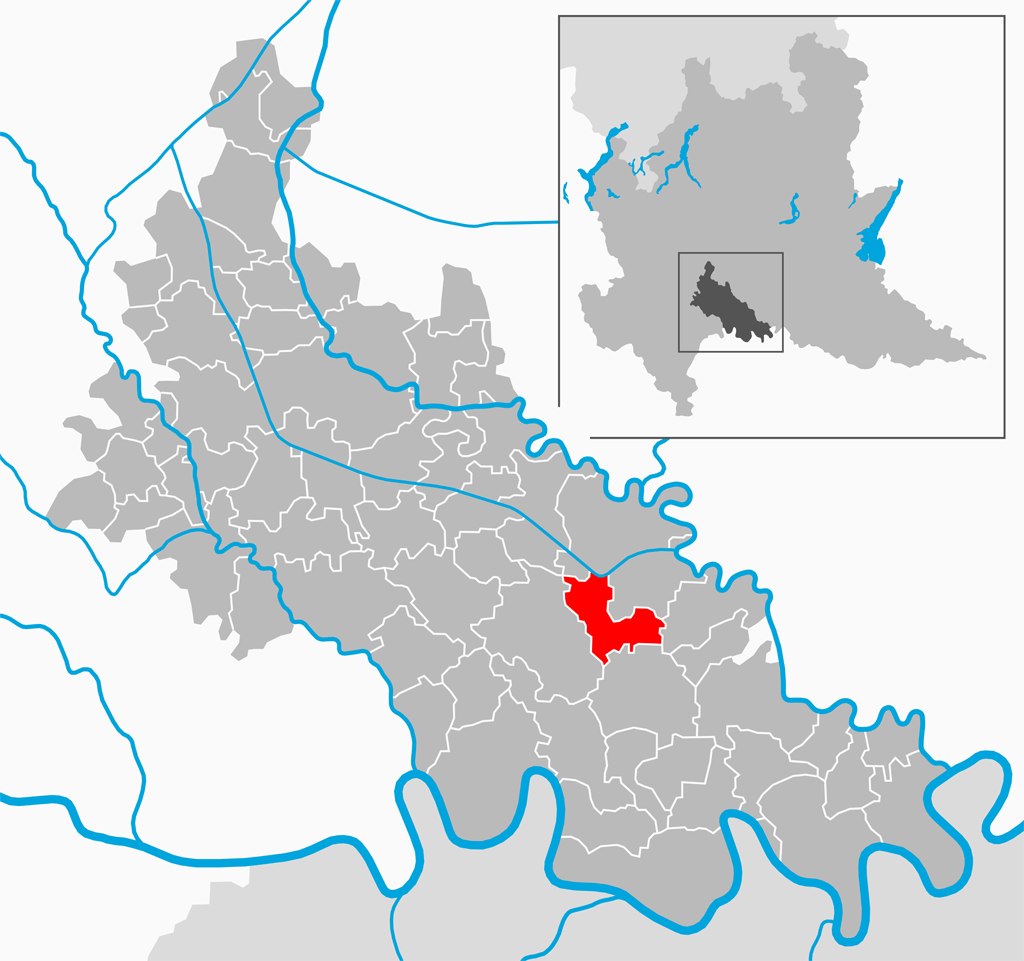

- Location within Italy Location within Lombardy
- Coordinates: 45°11.52′N 9°40.32′E
- Country: Italy
- Region: Lombardy
- Province: Lodi (LO)

Government
  - Mayor: Roberto Depoli

Area
  - Total: 11.2 km^{2} (4.3 sq mi)
- Elevation: 63 m (207 ft)

Population (30 November 2012)
  - Total: 901
  - Density: 80.4/km^{2} (208/sq mi)
- Demonym: Tarranovesi
- Time zone: UTC+1 (CET)
  - Summer (DST): UTC+2 (CEST)
- Postal code: 26827
- Dialing code: 0377
- Website: Official website

Terranova dei Passerini (Lodigiano: Teranöva) is a comune (municipality) in the Province of Lodi in the Italian region Lombardy, located about 50 kilometres (31 mi) southeast of Milan and about 20 kilometres (12 mi) southeast of Lodi.

Terranova dei Passerini borders the following municipalities: Turano Lodigiano, Bertonico, Castiglione d'Adda, Casalpusterlengo, Castelgerundo, Codogno.
