= Casalpusterlengo =

- Comune
- Città di Casalpusterlengo
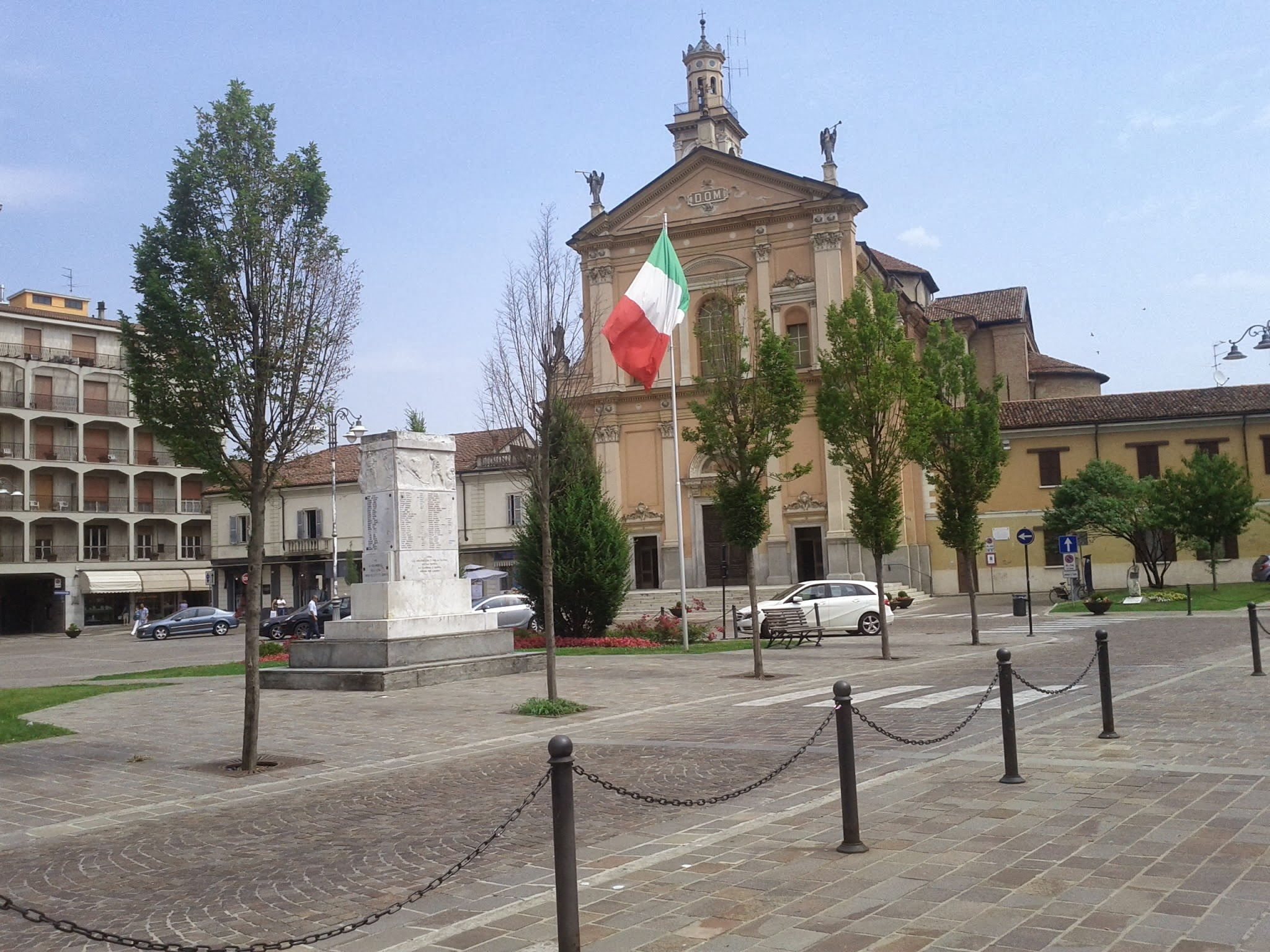
- Piazza del Popolo

- Coat of arms

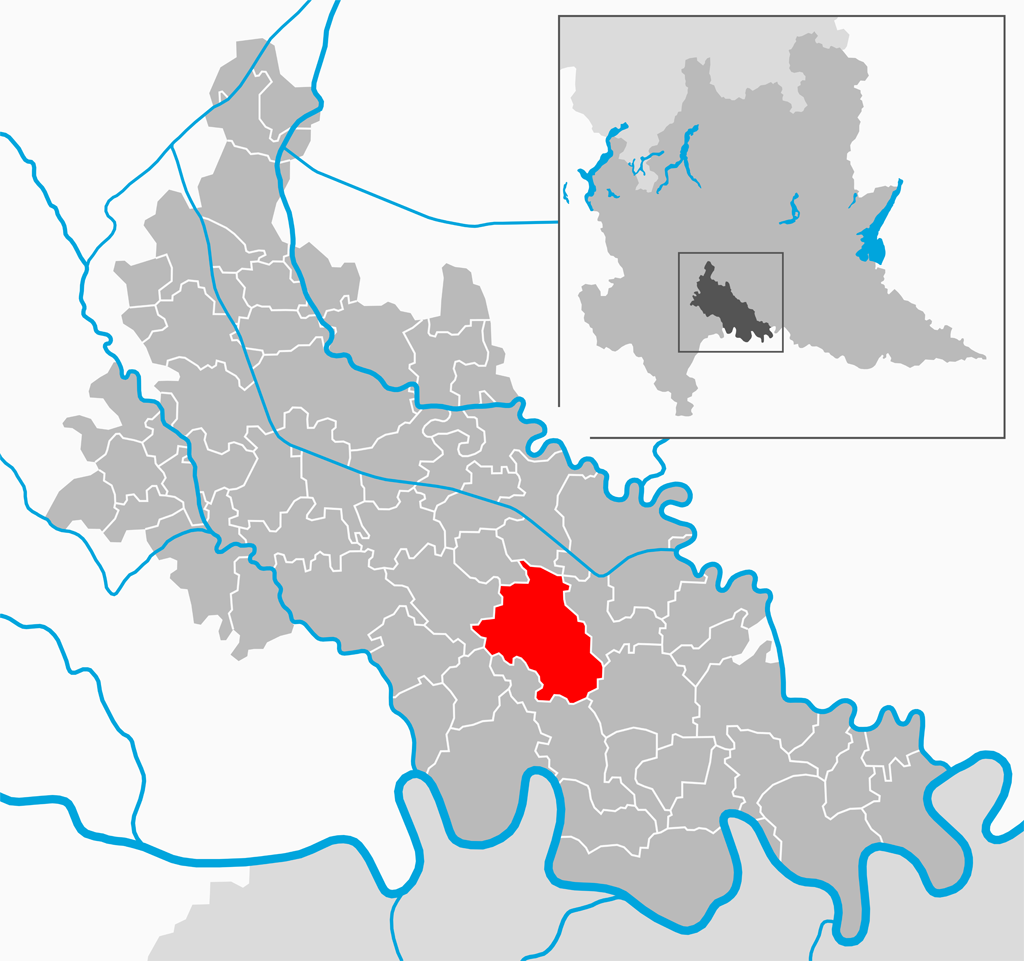

- Location within Italy Location within Lombardy
- Coordinates: 45°11′N 9°39′E
- Country: Italy
- Region: Lombardy
- Province: Lodi (LO)
- Frazioni: Borasca, Vittadone, Zorlesco

Government
  - Mayor: Elia Dal Miglio (Centre-Right)

Area
  - Total: 25.61 km^{2} (9.89 sq mi)
- Elevation: 60 m (200 ft)

Population (31 December 2017)
  - Total: 15,280
  - Density: 596.6/km^{2} (1,545/sq mi)
- Demonym: Casalini
- Time zone: UTC+1 (CET)
  - Summer (DST): UTC+2 (CEST)
- Postal code: 26841, 26829
- Dialing code: 0377
- Website: Official website

Casalpusterlengo is a comune (municipality) in the Province of Lodi in the Italian region Lombardy, located about 50 kilometres (31 mi) southeast of Milan and about 20 kilometres (12 mi) southeast of Lodi.

It received the honorary title of city with a presidential decree on 30 October 1975. The town has a Baroque church of Santi Bartolomeo e Martino, which was built in the 14th century but refurbished between 1602 and 1610. The town also has a communal palace and a tower from the medieval castle.

Casalpusterlengo borders the following municipalities: Turano Lodigiano, Secugnago, Brembio, Terranova dei Passerini, Codogno, Ospedaletto Lodigiano, and Somaglia.

== Notable people ==
- Carlo Arcari, Footballer
- Angelo Arcari (1907–1985), footballer
- Pietro Arcari (1909–1988), footballer
- Bruno Arcari (1915–2004), footballer
- Nino Staffieri (1931–2018), Roman Catholic Bishop
