= AC Codogno 1908 =

Italian football club

Codogno
- Full name: Codogno Calcio 1908
- Nickname: Codognese
- Founded: 1908; 118 years ago as, Associazione Sportiva Codogno; 1912; 114 years ago as, Unione Sportiva Codognese; 1914; 112 years ago as, Unione Sportiva Codogno; 2026; 0 years ago as, Codogno Calcio 1908
- Ground: Stadio Fratelli Molinari, Codogno, Italy
- Capacity: 4,000
- Chairman: Alessandro Pellini; Emanuele Porzio
- Manager: Maurizio Tassi
- League: Eccellenza Lombardia
- 2000–01: Serie D/B, 15th (relegated)
Home colours	Away colours

Codogno Calcio 1908 is an football club based in the northern Italian province of Lodi. It currently plays in Eccellenza Lombardia

== History ==
AC Codogno was founded in 1908 under the name "Codogno Sports Association". In Codogno, at that time, there were some existing sports entities such as AS Fanfulla, the "Students' Association" (later Circle Pallavicino) and the FBC Lodi. However, Association Football in Codogno had its origins in smaller clubs such as SG Codogno which promoted gymnastics and athletics. (The "Gymnastics Company Codogno", commencing 26 July 1892, was affiliated with the FGNI on 14 January 1893). In 1906, Alberto Quaglia was engaged by SG Cogogno to teach members the rudiments of soccer, including respect for other players and for the game itself. However, Quaglia left after only a year. Without leadership, some of the club members who were interested in soccer, drifted away to the Codogno Sports Association early in the spring of 1908. The AC Codogno's first major game was on the morning of Sunday, 18 September 1910 against AS Fanfulla, who were considered the best local soccer club. Fanfulla won. In 1911, fixtures were interrupted due to the departure of young men to the Libyan-Turkish War. Around this time the name of AC Codogno was changed to "Union Sports Codogno". The U.S. Codogno joined the Italian National Gymnastics Federation (FGNI) on 31 May 1912 and the Italian Federation of Sports Athletics (FISA) in 1914. After World War I, as young men returned from hostilities, U.S. Codogno began to play new local clubs such as U.S. Sant'Angelina of F.C. Piacenza, U. S. Casalpusterlengo and several other smaller teams.

=== Football Championships ===
On 25 November 1919, after fulfilling requirements of playing field size (90m x 45m) and suitable enclosures, the Lombardi Regional Committee officially endorsed US Codogno to the regional championship. Despite this endorsement, a number of problems arose. US Codogno was pitted against top-level teams with advanced technical skills. An exchange of players with AC Fanfulla was unbalanced. Young players coming through the ranks who may have improved US Codogno's game, such as Mariano Tansini Arcari and the like, moved on to join more advanced teams. In some circumstances, US Codogno could not field a team. Progression to a higher division at this stage was impossible. US Codogno was included in the little-known Fourth Division. In addition, there was a legal dispute over the nature of the relationship between clubs and the FIGC. Nevertheless, by the end of the 1927 – 1928 season, when the FIGC had created a Series A and a Series B, US Codongo was promoted to part of the First Division (now "Serie C1"). Since then, their success and level of playing has been variable.(See table below).

Year	Group	Place
1927	C1	–
1928	B	Fifth
1932	A	Last
1934	C	–
1938	C	–
1939	B	Third
1941–1947	C	–
1946	F	Second
1947	D	Third

In 2008, Codogno celebrated its 100-year anniversary but suffered defeat at the hands of San Biagio in the Lombardi regional championships.
