= Cervignano =

Cervignano may refer to:

- Cervignano d'Adda, municipality in the province of Lodi, in the region Lombardy, Italy
- Cervignano del Friuli, municipality in the province of Udine, in the region Friuli-Venezia Giulia, Italy
