= Pietro Baratono =

Italian politician

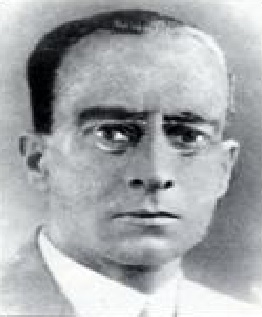

Undersecretary to the Presidency of the Council of Ministers of the Kingdom of Italy
- In office 27 July 1943 – 1 February 1944
- Preceded by: Amilcare Rossi
- Succeeded by: Dino Philipson

Prefect of Novara
- In office 16 July 1929 – 16 August 1931
- Preceded by: Decio Samuele Cantore
- Succeeded by: Piero Ducceschi

Prefect of Florence
- In office 16 August 1931 – 1 March 1932
- Preceded by: Iginio Coffari
- Succeeded by: Luigi Maggioni

High Commissioner for the City and the Province of Naples
- In office 1 March 1932 – 1 August 1936
- Preceded by: Michele Guaccero Castelli
- Succeeded by: Giovanni Battista Marziali

Prefect of Turin
- In office 1 July 1937 – 16 August 1938
- Preceded by: Giovanni Oriolo
- Succeeded by: Carlo Tiengo

Personal details
- Born: 25 September 1884 Frosinone, Kingdom of Italy
- Died: 4 December 1947 (aged 63) Rome, Italy
- Party: National Fascist Party
- Awards: Order of the Crown of Italy; Order of Saints Maurice and Lazarus; Colonial Order of the Star of Italy

Pietro Baratono (25 September 1884 in Frosinone – 4 December 1947 in Rome) was an Italian politician and civil servant, who served as Undersecretary to the Presidency of the Council of Ministers of the Kingdom of Italy in the Badoglio I Cabinet, the first after the fall of the Fascist regime. He also served as prefect in several Italian cities and member of the Council of State.

== Biography ==
The son of a Carabinieri officer, he graduated in law in 1907 and on the following year he started working for the Ministry of the Interior, initially in the provincial administration and later (from 1910) in the central administration. He participated in the First World War and in 1919 he entered the service of the Supreme Command. He then returned to his career in the Ministry of the Interior, joining the National Fascist Party and becoming deputy prefect (1925) and then prefect of Novara (1929), Florence (1931), Naples (in 1932, specifically designated as High Commissioner by Benito Mussolini as an "honest, strict and reactionary public official" tasked with carrying out a plan for the urban renewal of the city) and Turin (1937).

In the Piedmontese capital he came into conflict with the local Fascist leader Piero Gazzotti (whom he had accused for interference in his role and for foul play, and who accused him of "jealousy" and "hostility" and called him an "old Giolittian tool, Freemason and anti-fascist"), linked to PNF secretary Achille Starace; despite the support of the Undersecretary of the Interior Guido Buffarini Guidi for Baratono (who was able to force the podestà of Turin Ugo Sartirana, an old blackshirt, to resign due to his favoritism towards the Party, to which he had given public money and plots of land) which resulted in his dismissal from office (which was entrusted to Carlo Tiengo), Gazzotti eventually prevailed, and in August 1938 Baratono was dismissed from his post (which was given to Fascist prefect Carlo Tiengo) and expelled from the Party. In 1938 he became a member of the Council of State, and during the last phase of the Fascist regime he worked at the Ministry of Finance as a member of the Supervisory Commission on Public Debt and of the College of Arbitration for the regulation and review of war orders.

After the fall of the regime he became Undersecretary to the Presidency of the Council of Ministers in the first Badoglio government, formally until February 1944 but de facto until September 1943, as after the armistice of Cassibile he was unable to follow the government to Brindisi and remained in German-occupied territory, hiding from the authorities of the Italian Social Republic which had dismissed him from his post as Councilor of State and had him indicted by the Special Tribunal for the Defense of the State. In 1945 he was reinstated as Councilor of State and in 1946 he became judge at the Supreme Military Court and President of the first degree epuration commission at the Ministry of the Interior (in this role he complained to the High Commissioner for Epuration for the excessive softness of the epuration criteria). After the abolition of the monarchy he was appointed Commissioner for the administration of the goods of the Crown of the suppressed Ministry of the Royal House from 19 June 1946 to 4 December 1947, when he died in Rome.
