= Boffalora =

Boffalora may refer to:

- Boffalora d'Adda, municipality in the province of Lodi in the Italian region Lombardy
- Boffalora sopra Ticino, municipality in the Metropolitan City of Milan in the Italian region Lombardy
