= Renato Morelli =

Italian politician (1905–1977)

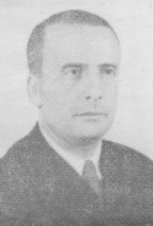

Undersecretary to the Presidency of the Council of Ministers of the Kingdom of Italy
- In office 22 April 1944 – 18 June 1944
- Preceded by: Dino Philipson
- Succeeded by: Giuseppe Spataro

Member of the Italian Constituent Assembly
- In office 25 June 1946 – 31 January 1948

Personal details
- Born: 17 July 1905 Campobasso, Kingdom of Italy
- Died: 10 March 1977 (aged 71) Rome, Italy
- Party: Italian Liberal Party

Renato Morelli (Campobasso, 17 July 1905 – Rome, 10 March 1977) was an anti-fascist, Liberal Italian lawyer and politician who served as Undersecretary to the Presidency of the Council of Ministers of the Kingdom of Italy in the Badoglio II Cabinet and Undersecretary of State for Foreign Affairs as well as Minister for Africa (Colonies) in the Bonomi (I and II), Parri and De Gasperi (I) cabinets. He was later a member of the Italian Constituent Assembly. Between 1948 and 1967 he chaired INAIL, the national workers' insurance agency and its hospital network as well as ISSA, the ILO-based International Social Security Association

== Biography ==
Born in Campobasso in 1905, he moved to Naples at a young age and, after graduating in law - as the top graduate in his year - and social sciences, he worked as a successful lawyer and collaborated for many years with Il Mattino and other Liberal newspapers, resigning his position due to his opposition to Fascism in 1939.

In 1935 the Bank of Naples, of which he served as General Counsel, appointed him manager of the smaller banks it had absorbed across the South of Italy, following the difficulties of the Great Depression. During this period he also befriended Benedetto Croce, of whom he became one of the main disciples and the principal political aide and emissary, while operating as a member of the clandestine National Liberation Committee (CLN)

After the fall of Fascism on 25 July 1944, he became one of the founding members, along with Croce, of the re-constituted Italian Liberal Party and, in late September, after the armistice of Cassibile, he participated in the Four Days of Naples popular revolt against Nazi troops, for his activities during which he was awarded a gold medal by the City of Naples.

In 1944 he was appointed Undersecretary to the Presidency of the Council of Ministers of the Badoglio II Cabinet at Croce's recommendation, serving as Croce's right-hand man in the government. He was subsequently Undersecretary of State for Foreign Affairs with responsibility for overseas Italians and Acting Minister for Italian Africa (Colonies) in the Bonomi I and II, Parri and De Gasperi I cabinets, between 1944 and 1946, when he was elected to the Italian Constituent Assembly.

From 1948 to 1965 he was President of INAIL the Italian national workers accident and health insurance fund, which he restructured financially and for which he built and consolidated a large network of dedicated orthopaedic and traumatology hospitals across Italy, earning respect from all sides of the political spectrum. For his significant expertise and track record in the field of social insurance, he was elected chairman, in 1949, of the International Social Security Organisation (ISSA) an agency of the International Labor Office (ILO) accredited with the United Nations. Under Renato Morelli's almost two decades of leadership, ISSA expanded its membership to over one hundred nations and became the prime forum for cooperation by the world's foremost social insurance organisations and agencies.

Handicapped by a severe form of Parkinson's disease since 1964, he progressively retired from active life and died in Rome in March 1977, where he had lived since its liberation in 1944.
