= Merlino =

Merlino Merlin (Lombard)
- Comune
- Comune di Merlino
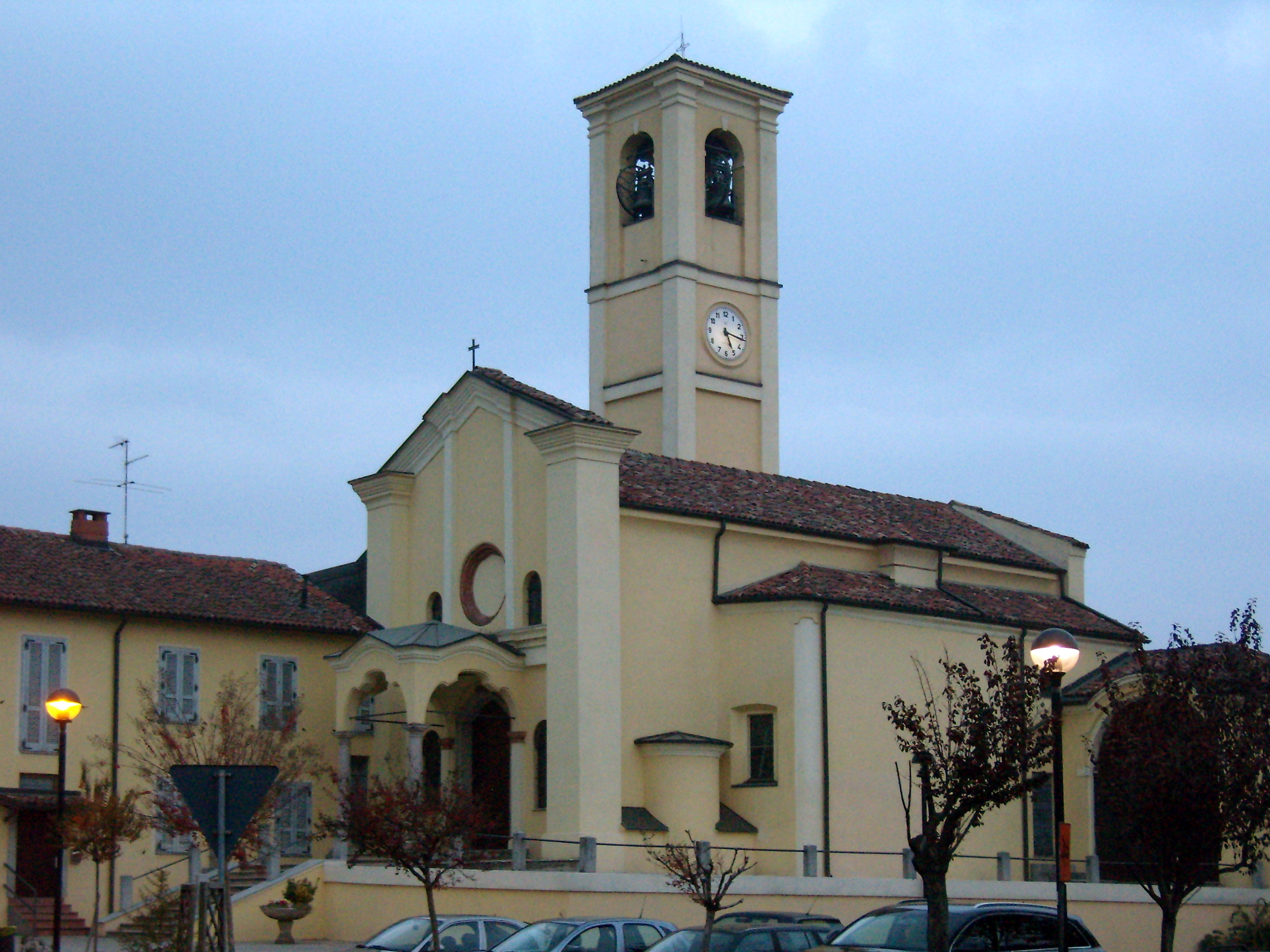

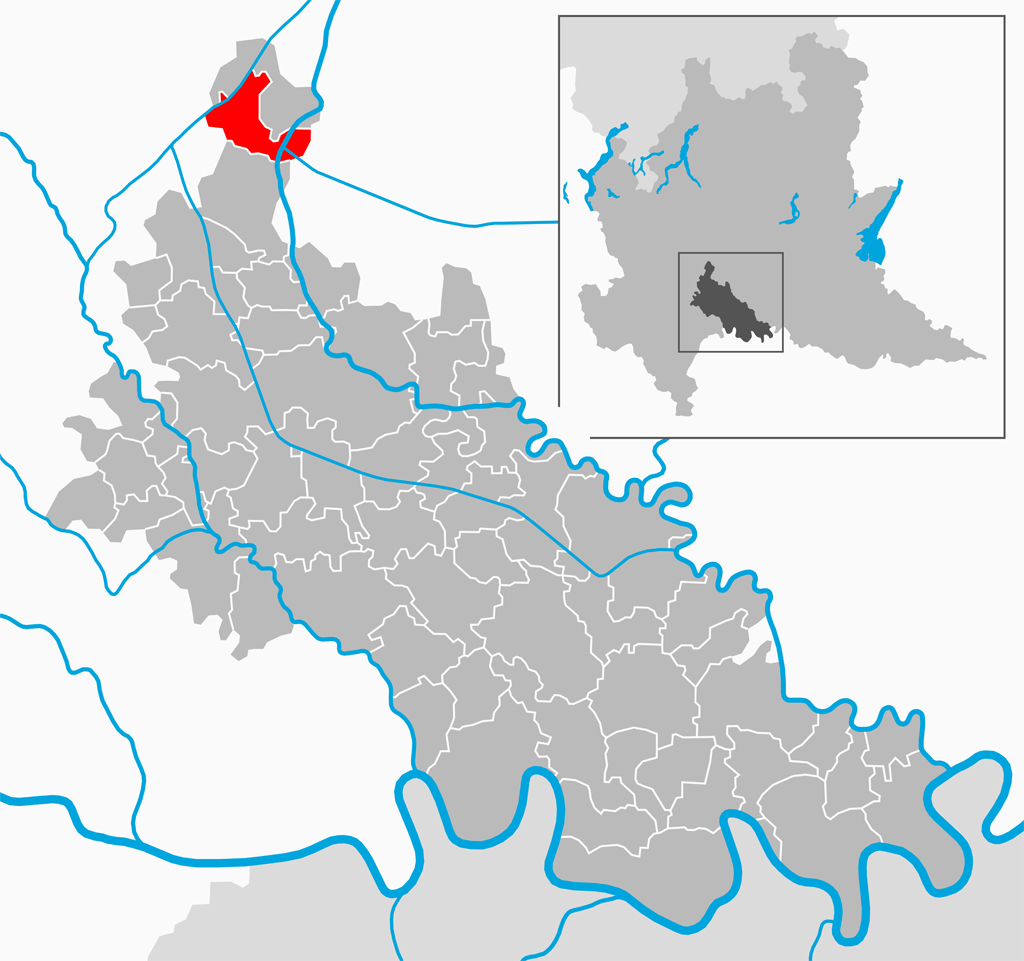

- Location within Italy Location within Lombardy
- Coordinates: 45°28′N 9°31′E
- Country: Italy
- Region: Lombardy
- Province: Province of Lodi (LO)

Area
  - Total: 10.9 km^{2} (4.2 sq mi)

Population (Dec. 2004)
  - Total: 1,360
  - Density: 125/km^{2} (323/sq mi)
- Time zone: UTC+1 (CET)
  - Summer (DST): UTC+2 (CEST)
- Postal code: 20067
- Dialing code: 02

Merlino (Lombard: Merlin [merˈlĩː]) is a comune (municipality) in the Province of Lodi in the Italian region Lombardy, located about 25 kilometres (16 mi) east of Milan and about 15 kilometres (9 mi) north of Lodi. As of the 31.12.2021 census it had a population of 1,281 and a population density of 4,417km² and an area of 10.9 square kilometres (4.2 mi^{2}).

Merlino borders the following municipalities: Rivolta d'Adda, Settala, Comazzo, Paullo, Zelo Buon Persico, Spino d'Adda.

As of the 2026 elections the mayor of Merlino is Attorney Giuliano Sottoriva the elections recorded as turnout of 46.8% compared to the previous elections 59.97%

== Demographic evolution ==
Historical population

| Year | Pop. | ±% |
|---|---|---|
| 1861 | 941 | — |
| 1871 | 1,026 | +9.0% |
| 1881 | 1,019 | −0.7% |
| 1901 | 964 | −5.4% |
| 1911 | 977 | +1.3% |

| Year | Pop. | ±% |
|---|---|---|
| 1921 | 1,070 | +9.5% |
| 1931 | 983 | −8.1% |
| 1936 | 1,048 | +6.6% |
| 1951 | 1,129 | +7.7% |
| 1961 | 933 | −17.4% |

| Year | Pop. | ±% |
|---|---|---|
| 1971 | 700 | −25.0% |
| 1981 | 759 | +8.4% |
| 1991 | 912 | +20.2% |
| 2001 | 1,264 | +38.6% |

Source: Data from ISTAT
