= Giuseppe Mastromattei =

- Giuseppe Mastromattei meeting Adolf Hitler at the Brenner Pass in May 1938, with Heinrich Himmler in the background

Prefect of Bolzano
- In office 10 September 1933 – 17 February 1940
- Preceded by: Giovanni Battista Marziali
- Succeeded by: Agostino Podestà

Prefect of Trapani
- In office 16 January 1932 – 10 September 1933
- Preceded by: Enzo Ferrari
- Succeeded by: Pietro Bruno

Federal secretary of the Italian Fasces of Combat of Genoa
- In office March 1921 – December 1921

Federal secretary of the Italian Fasces of Combat of Liguria
- In office 1921–1921

Personal details
- Born: 17 June 1897 Fabriano, Kingdom of Italy
- Died: 5 September 1986 (aged 89) Rome, Italy
- Party: National Fascist Party
- Awards: Order of the Crown of Italy; Order of Saints Maurice and Lazarus

Military service
- Allegiance: Kingdom of Italy
- Branch/service: Royal Italian Army; MVSN
- Rank: Major (Army); Lieutenant General (MVSN)
- Battles/wars: World War I

Giuseppe Mastromattei (Fabriano, 17 June 1897 – Rome, 15 September 1986) was an Italian Fascist politician and civil servant, who served as prefect of Bolzano from 1933 to 1940. He was the longest serving prefect of the province of Bolzano and oversaw the forced Italianization of South Tyrol under the Fascist regime, as well as the South Tyrol Option Agreement of 1939.

== Biography ==
=== Early life and career ===
He was born in Fabriano, province of Ancona, on 17 June 1897, the son of Donato Mastromattei and Giovanna Carrozzo. After graduating from a technical institute, he volunteered at age eighteen during the First World War, becoming an Alpini officer and being wounded and decorated for valor, ending the war with the rank of captain (later promoted to major). After the war he joined the sansepolcrismo in 1919 and became one of the leading figures of the Italian Fasces of Combat of Genoa, as well as a squadrista, participating in the storming of Palazzo San Giorgio (seat of the Socialist cooperatives of Genoa) and of the Chamber of Labour of Genoa. In 1920-1921 he was secretary of the Genoa section of the Fasces of Combat, then regional secretary for Liguria in 1921, and federal secretary of Genoa from March to December 1921.

In 1922 he participated in the march on Rome, and after the appointment of Benito Mussolini as prime minister he was appointed deputy general commissioner of emigration to Rio de Janeiro from May 1923 to March 1925, and later extraordinary commissioner of the Fascist federation of Turin from December 1930 to June 1931. In 1930-1931 he also served inspector of the National Fascist Party and president of the Italian Automobile Club and of Agip. In 1932 he graduated in economics from the University of Palermo, after which he began his career as a prefect; on 16 January 1932 he was appointed second class prefect and made prefect of Trapani, where he remained until September 1933, when he was appointed prefect of Bolzano. In January 1934 he was made a luogotenente generale (major general) in the Volunteer Militia for National Security.

=== Prefect of Bolzano ===
Bolzano, known as Bozen prior to World War I, was the capital of South Tyrol (known in Italy as Alto Adige), a province gained by Italy after the victory in the First World War, but entirely populated by German speakers. The Fascist regime had already started a program of forced Italianization of the province, devised by Senator Ettore Tolomei. This was opposed by South Tyrolean irredentists, who advocated the separation of South Tyrol from Italy either through an annexation to Austria as in the Habsburg era, or through the creation of an independent Tyrol. The coming to power of Adolf Hitler in Germany in 1933 led to the spread of the Pan-Germanic idea, according to which all the territories inhabited by ethnic German populations should have become part of a Greater Germany. As a result, many National Socialist clubs and organizations arose clandestinely in South Tyrol, including the Völkischer Kampfring Südtirols (VKS).

In this context, according to the Fascist model of the "iron prefect" sent with full powers to "pacify" "difficult" regions (already experimented with Cesare Mori in Sicily), Mussolini chose to entrust South Tyrol to Mastromattei, who began to monitor and repress German irredentism, while speeding up the Italianization process. Years later, in the latest in a long series of reports periodically sent to Mussolini, the prefect described the situation existing at the beginning of his term in this way: "In the summer of 1933 the clergy and the aristocracy remained Austrian, always confident in the possibility of a stronger Austria which, supported by the Church and by supranational political systems, could assert her rights over the restitution of South Tyrol. It was they who, on the basis of religious faith, kept the German-Tyrolean language, habits and customs very much alive. Young professionals - and among them those who had been educated in our universities - the new artists and [...] non-native intellectuals had for some time [...] been advocating the need for a new policy [...] A local policy of shrewdness could have guided them in our favor. But the mistakes previously committed and the deficiency of our trade unions could not have had a favorable attraction on them ... In a very short time, Nazism organized itself throughout the province. When I arrived in Bolzano I found the work of German organization practically already completed. Alto Adige thus found itself between two trends; one made up of the old Austrians, the other of the Nazis, the latter having the most active part of the population, the youth."

Mastromattei favored the industrialization and modernization of the traditionally agricultural region, and personally convinced some large companies, such as Montecatini, Lancia, Feltrinelli and Falck, to open industrial plants in South Tyrol, exploiting hydroelectric energy produced by power plants built or upgraded during the previous years. The new industrial area of Bolzano, built on an area of three million square meters, was inaugurated on 20 December 1936, soon becoming a destination for the immigration of Italian-speaking workers from Trentino, Veneto and Friuli. The population of Bolzano therefore increased from about thirty thousand inhabitants in 1919 to over sixty thousand. The arrival of thousands of Italian workers aroused the protests of the German-speaking inhabitants, who saw this as an attempt at colonization, and feared to become a minority. On a visit to Bolzano in November 1938, Foreign Minister Galeazzo Ciano commented in his diary: "In Bolzano I visited the industrial area, which is already very important and in full development. The appearance of the city is changing from Nordic to Mediterranean. Mastromattei's hand is, perhaps, a little heavy, but very effective. In ten years or less it will be difficult to recognize Bolzano as the old Bozen."

==== The options ====
On 1 August 1937, Mastromattei was promoted to first class prefect. Following the annexation of Austria by the Third Reich in 1938 (Anschluss), and the subsequent succession of Berlin to Vienna in the dispute with Italy for the control of the region, the South Tyrolean Nazi organizations intensified their activity, but were soon disappointed by Hitler's diplomatic strategy, aimed at sacrificing German claims beyond the Brenner to the rapprochement with Fascist Italy, which had begun in 1936. However, Hitler, despite having solemnly recognized the Brenner border on 7 May 1938 at Palazzo Venezia, rejected Mussolini's request to make the news public, so that he could return to the matter later if the opportunity arose. This behaviour aroused suspicion in Mastromattei, who considered it the "first symptom that the Germans, seized by repentance or second thoughts, were beginning to buy time". Mastromattei was informed by the German consul in Milan, Otto Bene, of a German plan to transfer the ethnic German population to the Reich, which in the past had already been decidedly rejected by Mussolini. The new diplomatic situation changed the Italian position, and on 6 May 1939, in view of the signing of the Pact of Steel, a meeting was held at the Hotel Continental in Milan between the German Foreign Minister Joachim von Ribbentrop, his Italian counterpart Ciano and the Italian ambassador in Berlin, Bernardo Attolico, to examine Hitler's requests. Ciano made it clear to Ribbentrop that the resolution of the South Tyrolean question was a precondition imposed by Italy for the alliance, prompting the Germans to officially renounce the region. Traveling to Berlin for the signing of the Pact of Steel, on 20 May 1939, Ciano met Mastromattei and showed him the text of the treaty. The prefect commented that the preamble, which sanctioned the definitive recognition of the border between Italy and Germany and therefore the renunciation by the Germans to South Tyrol, would have given "a great shock to South Tyrolean irredentism". After the treaty was signed, on 17 June Hitler tasked Heinrich Himmler to start negotiations to resolve the dispute.

On 21 June Mastromattei left for Berlin to be part of the Italian-German commission for the repatriation of South Tyroleans opting for Germany. While the Italians wanted a definitive pact that sanctioned the departure of about ten thousand South Tyroleans of German ethnicity and the four thousand Nazi agitators, the Germans were aiming for a vague agreement in order to postpone the exodus, aiming to return to the issue in the future when the international situation would be more favorable to them. If this was not possible, the Germans would employ all propaganda means to have a plebiscite for Germany as a result, in order to use that result as an argument for the region's right to join the Reich. Furthermore, by selling to Italy the assets of those opting for Germany in exchange for products, and then reimbursing the newcomers to the Reich with paper marks, the Germans would have repaid the substantial debts with Italy (both direct and inherited from Austria), amounting to four and a half billion lire. According to Mastromattei, with this project, attributed to Hjalmar Schacht, "in Berlin they thought of overcoming the crisis without spending a penny, selling to Italy what was already hers".

The meeting was held at the SS headquarters in Berlin and was attended by Mastromattei, Attolico (head of the Italian delegation), Himmler, Ernst Wilhelm Bohle (head of the NSDAP/AO, the organization of the foreign sections of the Nazi party), Otto Bene, Baron Ernst von Weizsäcker and SS General Karl Wolff. At the end, the two parties respectively appointed Bene and Mastromattei as delegates for the management of the agreement. The options would take place by 31 December 1939. The Germans opened "information centers" in South Tyrol, de facto propaganda offices managed by the SS, in order to push as many South Tyroleans as possible to opt for Germany, through threats of reprisals and by spreading the false rumor that those who had opted for Italy ("Dableiber") would have been deported south of the Po, to Calabria or Sicily. Mastromattei reacted harshly, ordering various roundups against the agitators, which earned him the hostility of the Germans. Consequently, in November 1939, during the hottest phase of the voting, Wolff went to Rome to protest and obtained his dismissal by the Undersecretary for the Interior, Guido Buffarini Guidi.

=== Later life ===
On 9 January 1940, Mastromattei sent Mussolini the last report on his work in South Tyrol, in which he drew up an account of his activity and illustrated the problems with the Germans. The document, consisting of fourteen typewritten pages, remained secret until the early 1980s. In March, at the end of his tenure in Bolzano, he was appointed president of the Italian Lignite Company, a role he held until June 1943. Also in 1943, Mastromattei sent a telegram to Pietro Badoglio, intercepted by the regime, in which the ex-prefect gave his willingness to collaborate with the marshal. Following the establishment of the Italian Social Republic in September 1943, this resulted in him being imprisoned for six months in Venice. After the end of the war, the commission for sanctions against Fascists decided not to proceed against him. In postwar Italy he worked in commerce and became president of the Italian-Egyptian Chamber of Commerce. In 1961 he published a book about his time as prefect in South Tyrol, entitled L'Alto Adige fra le due guerre ("Alto Adige between the two wars"). He died in Rome on 15 September 1986.
