= Montanaso Lombardo =

- Comune
- Comune di Montanaso Lombardo
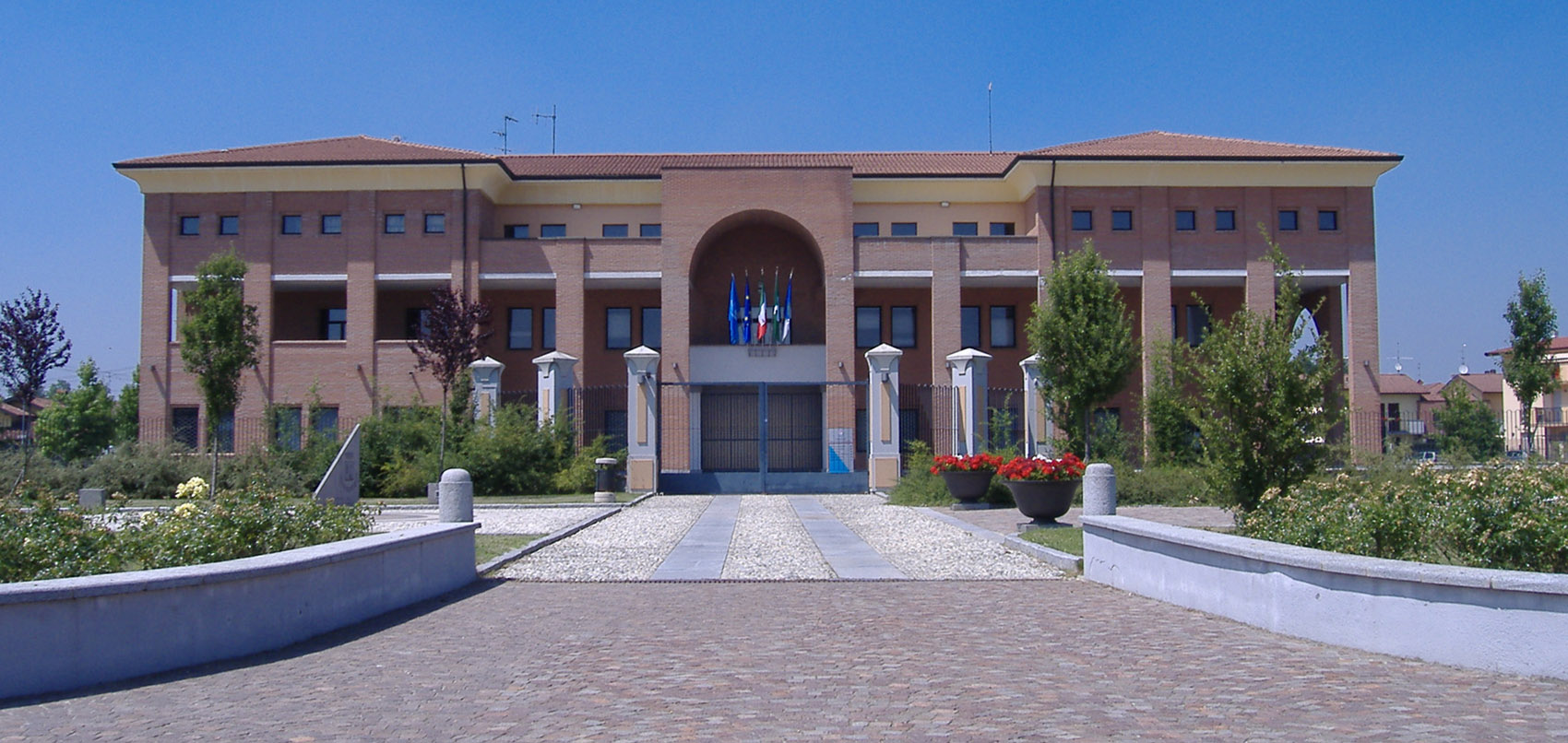
- The Municipality Palace

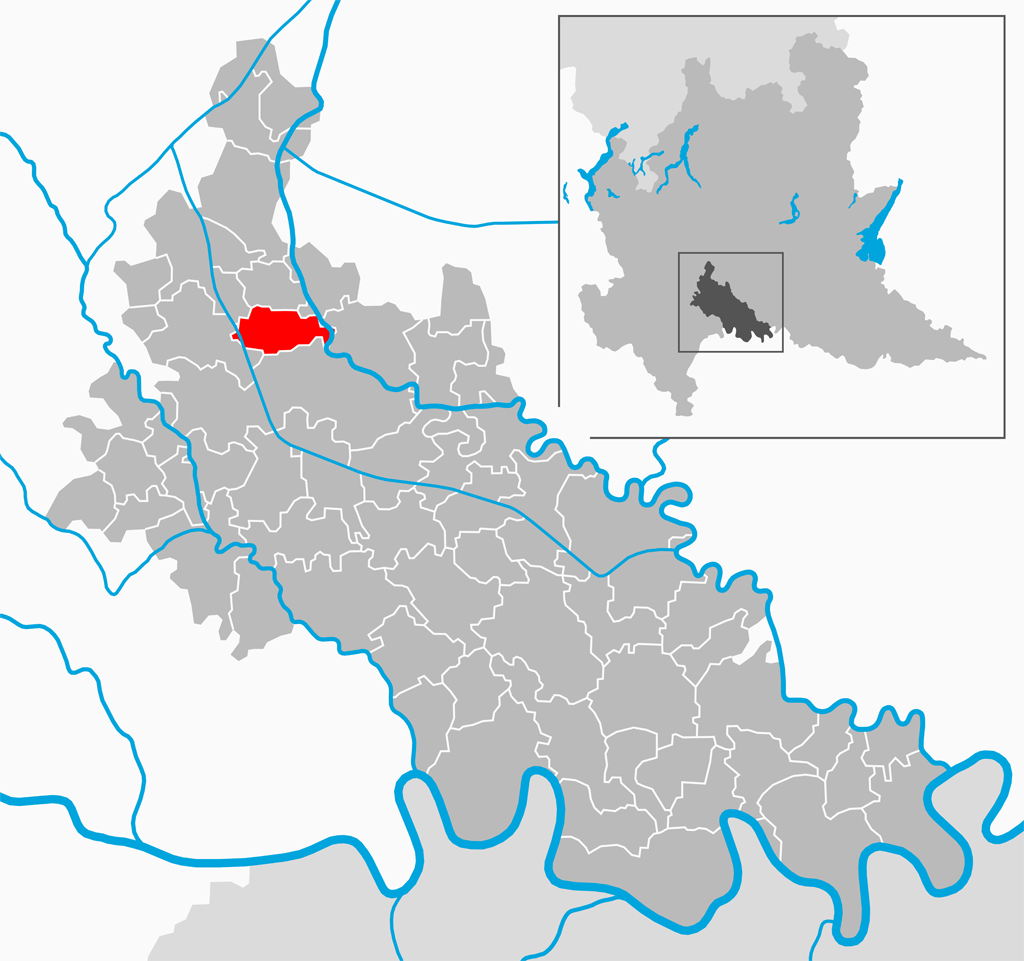

- Location within Italy Location within Lombardy
- Coordinates: 45°10′N 9°35′E
- Country: Italy
- Region: Lombardy
- Province: Lodi (LO)

Government
  - Mayor: Vittorio Gargioni

Area
  - Total: 9.52 km^{2} (3.68 sq mi)
- Elevation: 83 m (272 ft)

Population (30 November 2017)
  - Total: 2,270
  - Density: 238/km^{2} (618/sq mi)
- Demonym: Montanasini
- Time zone: UTC+1 (CET)
  - Summer (DST): UTC+2 (CEST)
- Postal code: 26836
- Dialing code: 0371
- Website: Official website

Montanaso Lombardo (Lodigiano: Muntanas) is a comune (municipality) in the Province of Lodi in the Italian region Lombardy, located about 45 kilometres (28 mi) southeast of Milan and about 2 kilometres (1 mi) northeast of Lodi.

Montanaso Lombardo borders the following municipalities: Mulazzano, Boffalora d'Adda, Galgagnano, Tavazzano con Villavesco, Lodi.

== Culture ==
A celebration is held at The Church of St. George the Martyr on the third Sunday in October to honor the patron saint. The Church of the Assumption of the Blessed Virgin Mary is located in the town square. Our Lady of Arcagna Sanctuary is also located in Montanaso Lombardo.
