= Giovanni Battista Marziali =

Italian Fascist politician and civil servant

Prefect of Terni
- In office 16 September 1927 – 14 September 1928
- Preceded by: Michele Internicola
- Succeeded by: Enrico Cavalieri
- Prefect of Bolzano
- In office 15 September 1928 – 10 September 1933
- Preceded by: Umberto Ricci
- Succeeded by: Giuseppe Mastromattei

Prefect of Palermo
- In office 10 September 1933 – 1 August 1936
- Preceded by: Umberto Albini
- Succeeded by: Francesco Benigni

Prefect of Naples
- In office 1 August 1936 – 21 August 1939
- Preceded by: Pietro Baratono
- Succeeded by: Francesco Benigni

Prefect of Milan
- In office 22 August 1939 – 28 January 1941
- Preceded by: Giuseppe Marzano
- Succeeded by: Carlo Tiengo

Personal details
- Born: 29 April 1895 Alberoro, Kingdom of Italy
- Died: 23 October 1948 (aged 53) Florence, Italy
- Party: National Fascist Party

Military service
- Allegiance: Kingdom of Italy
- Branch/service: Royal Italian Army; MVSN
- Rank: Lieutenant (Army); Lieutenant General (MVSN)
- Battles/wars: World War I; Battles of the Isonzo

Giovanni Battista Marziali (29 April 1895 in Alberoro – 23 October 1948 in Florence) was an Italian Fascist politician and civil servant, who served as prefect in several Italian cities, including Milan, Naples, Palermo and Bolzano.

== Biography ==
Marziali volunteered in the Royal Italian Army during the First World War, fighting on the Karst Plateau as an infantry lieutenant and being seriously wounded on the Karst on 21 November 1916 and then again in Kostanjevica na Krasu on 6 August 1917, during the Tenth Battle of the Isonzo, which left him with a permanent disability. After returning to civilian life he graduated in Law at the University of Siena in 1921, and in the same year he married the Florentine Marta Jenna, of Jewish origin. On 1 October 1920 he joined the Florence section of the Italian Fasces of Combat, participating in several squadrist raids in Tuscany. After the transformation of the Fasces of Combat into the National Fascist Party he was secretary of its Florence section from September to December 1922, participating in the March on Rome, and then provincial councilor from 1923 to 1926. On October 27, 1929, he was appointed console generale (brigadier general) of the Voluntary Militia for National Security, being later promoted to luogotenente generale (lieutenant general).

In September 1927 he was chosen as prefect of Terni; after a year, in September 1928 he was appointed prefect of Bolzano until 1933, when he became prefect of Palermo, a post he held for three years, before becoming prefect of Naples in 1936. Although in disagreement with the Fascist racial laws of 1938, Marziali had to compile a list of all citizens of Jewish "race" present in the city, as dictated by the new law. On 22 August 1939 he was appointed prefect of Milan, a post he held until 28 January 1941, when he was replaced by Carlo Tiengo. From August 1941 to August 1943 he was a member of the Italian commission in charge of the French territories occupied by Italy.

After the armistice of Cassibile, Marziali was placed in retirement and thus resumed his activity as a lawyer. His wife, who had taken refuge in Badia Fiesolana, was captured and shot by the Germans, while Marziali was taken prisoner by the Allies and tried in Rome, where however he was absolved. After the war he headed the Nuovo Pignone steel works in Florence until he died of a heart attack in 1948.
