= Umberto Albini =

Italian Fascist politician (1895–1973)

State Undersecretary for the Interior of the Kingdom of Italy
- In office 6 February 1943 – 25 July 1943
- Preceded by: Guido Buffarini Guidi
- Succeeded by: Vito Reale

Member of the Chamber of Fasces and Corporations
- In office 23 March 1939 – 5 August 1943

Prefect of Naples
- In office 6 February 1943 – 7 June 1941
- Preceded by: Francesco Benigni
- Succeeded by: Marcello Vaccari

Prefect of Genoa
- In office 10 September 1933 – 7 June 1941
- Preceded by: Giuseppe Mormino
- Succeeded by: Dino Borri

Prefect of Palermo
- In office 16 July 1929 – 10 September 1933
- Preceded by: Cesare Mori
- Succeeded by: Giovanni Battista Marziali

Prefect of Bari
- In office 1 July 1928 – 16 July 1929
- Preceded by: Secondo Dezza
- Succeeded by: Enrico Cavalieri

Prefect of Taranto
- In office 20 May 1926 – 1 July 1928
- Preceded by: Antonio De Biase
- Succeeded by: Francesco Benigni

Prefect of Teramo
- In office 26 May 1925 – 20 May 1926
- Preceded by: Stefano De Ruggiero
- Succeeded by: Angelo Umberto Pacces

Personal details
- Born: 26 August 1895 Portomaggiore, Kingdom of Italy
- Died: 29 November 1973 (aged 78) Rome, Italy
- Party: National Fascist Party

Umberto Albini (26 August 1895 – 29 November 1973) was an Italian Fascist politician and civil servant, who served as State Undersecretary for the Interior of the Kingdom of Italy from February to July 1943 and as prefect in several Italian cities, including Genoa, Naples and Palermo.

== Biography ==
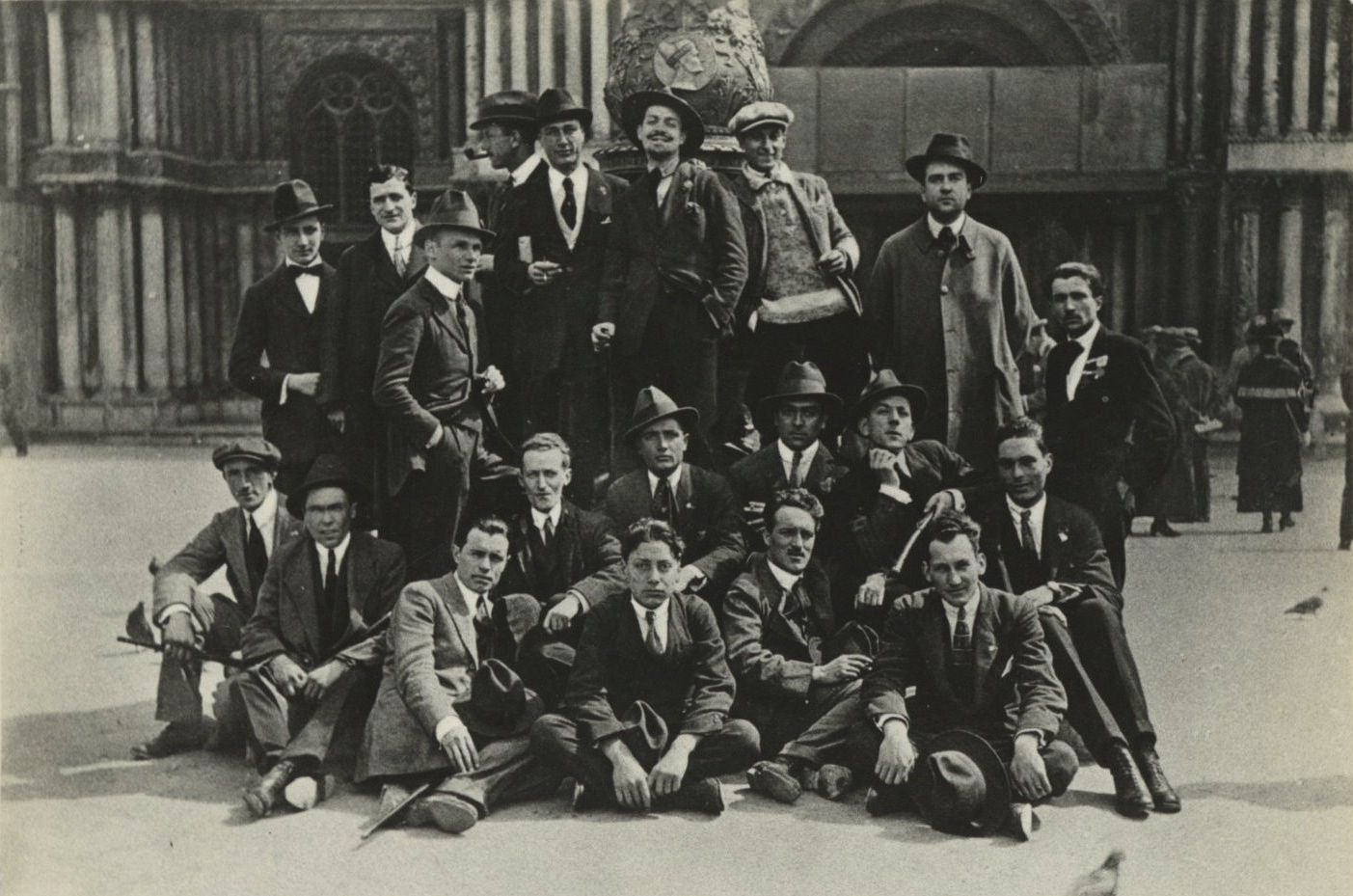
Albini with Italo Balbo and other Fascists in front of the Basilica of Saint Mark in Venice, 1921

After graduating in political and social sciences, he took part in the First World War as an infantry lieutenant. He joined the National Fascist Party in 1921, and participated in the march on Rome in October 1922. After the establishment of the Fascist regime he started working for the Ministry of the Interior, initially as regent of the sub-prefecture of La Spezia. He was then appointed questore of La Spezia from September 1923 to 1925 and then prefect of several cities, including Teramo (1925–1926), Taranto (1926–1928), Bari (1928–1929), Palermo (1929–1933), Genoa (1933–1941) and Naples (1941–1943).

In 1936 he was made console generale (brigadier general) of the Volunteer Militia for National Security, and in February 1943 he became a member of the Chamber of Fasces and Corporations as he was appointed undersecretary for the interior of the Mussolini Cabinet, replacing Guido Buffarini Guidi. He participated in the session of the Grand Council of Fascism on 25 July 1943 and voted in favor of the order of the day that resulted in the dismissal of Benito Mussolini and in the fall of the regime. For this, he was sentenced to death in absentia by the Italian Social Republic in the Verona trial in January 1944. He had meanwhile taken refuge in Allied-controlled southern Italy, where he was retired in August 1944 by the Bonomi cabinet. He died in Rome in 1973.
