= Carlo Tiengo =

Italian politician and civil servant (1892–1945)

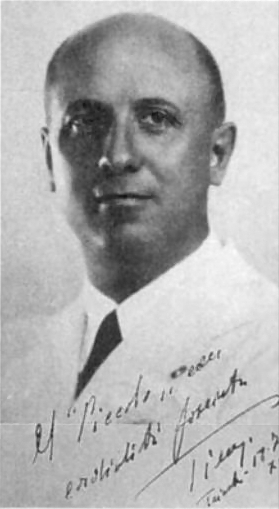

Minister of Corporations
- In office 6 February 1943 – 19 April 1943
- Prime Minister: Benito Mussolini
- Preceded by: Renato Ricci
- Succeeded by: Tullio Cianetti
- Member of the Chamber of Fasces and Corporations
- In office 23 March 1939 – 5 August 1943

Prefect of Trieste
- In office 16 January 1933 – 31 July 1936

Prefect of Bologna
- In office 1 August 1936 – 15 August 1936

Prefect of Turin
- In office 16 August 1936 – 1 February 1941

Prefect of Milan
- In office 1 February 1941 – 7 February 1943

Personal details
- Born: 1 April 1892 Adria, Kingdom of Italy
- Died: 11 May 1945 (aged 53) Paullo, Kingdom of Italy
- Party: National Fascist Party; Republican Fascist Party

Military service
- Allegiance: Kingdom of Italy
- Branch/service: Royal Italian Army; MVSN
- Battles/wars: World War I; Battle of Monte Grappa
- Awards: Silver Medal of Military Valor; Order of Saints Maurice and Lazarus; Order of the Crown of Italy; Order of the German Eagle

Carlo Tiengo (1 April 1892 – 11 May 1945) was an Italian Fascist politician and civil servant, Minister of Corporations of the Kingdom of Italy from February to April 1943 and member of the Chamber of Fasces and Corporations. He also served as prefect in several Italian cities, including Trieste, Milan and Turin.

== Biography ==
He was born in Adria in 1892, the son of Giovanni Battista Tiengo and schoolteacher Velia Gusella. In his youth he was one of the founders of the Green Cross of Adria and graduated in Law at the University of Padua, where he became part of an irredentist group called "San Giusto Battalion". He took part in the First World War with the rank of captain, earning a Silver Medal of Military Valor for the capture of an enemy outpost on Monte Asolone (Monte Grappa massif) in January 1918. Of republican ideas, he frequented the socialist-republican circles in Adria for some time, together with Giovanni Marinelli, but after attending a rally held by Benito Mussolini while finding himself by chance in Milan, he joined the Italian Fasces of Combat in April 1921. He then led the "action squads" in Polesine and took part in the March on Rome at the head of the "Polesana" Legion. For a short time, from January to March 1925, he was a member of the federal secretariat of the National Fascist Party of Rovigo, and following the establishment of the Voluntary Militia for National Security, he joined it, reaching the rank of console generale (brigadier general).

On 16 December 1926 Tiengo was appointed second class prefect, after which he was made prefect of Sondrio from 16 December 1926 to 16 September 1927, and later of Piacenza from 16 September 1927 to 16 December 1930. In January 1931 he was called to lead the prefecture of Gorizia, being promoted to first class prefect on 16 October 1932, and from 16 January 1933 to 31 July 1936 he served as prefect of Trieste. During his tenure in Gorizia he clashed with the elderly Slovenian archbishop of Gorizia Francesco Borgia Sedej, and later with the bishop of Trieste, Luigi Fogar; both bishops had formed during the years of the Habsburg empire and were therefore viewed with suspicion by the Fascist regime, especially because of their open opposition to the policy of Italianization. This led to negotiations between state and church that in October 1936 resulted in the resignation of Fogar, who was transferred to Rome, where he was appointed titular archbishop of the Archdiocese of Patras and assigned to the basilica of San Giovanni in Laterano. Tiengo, in the meantime, was transferred to the prefecture of Bologna on 1 August 1936, but only held the post for two weeks before being appointed prefect of Turin, replacing the previous prefect who had come into conflict with the federal secretary of the local section of the Fascist Party, Piero Gazzotti. Tiengo held until 1 February 1941.

In February 1941 he was appointed prefect of Milan, replacing Giovanni Battista Marziali; he held this post until 7 February 1943. In the same period he was also a member of the Chamber of Fasces and Corporations; after holding various positions at the top of the administration of the state and the ranks of the regime, in February 1943 he was appointed Minister of Corporations, thus becoming a member of the Grand Council of Fascism. He resigned for health reasons after two months, after which he was placed at the disposal of the Ministry of Finance, with the post of Commissioner for Paper and Cellulose and then of President of the National Institute for Consumption Tax Management. He retired for health reasons in August 1943.

Tiengo did not held any office during the Italian Social Republic, quietly living with his family in Adria until 1945, when he moved to Milan. In the days that preceded the collapse of the Italian Social Republic, Tiengo was present at the meeting hosted by Cardinal Ildefonso Schuster in the archbishopric in Milan in the morning of 25 April 1945 between Mussolini and the leaders of the local Committee for National Liberation in a final attempt to persuade the Duce to surrender. According to Sandro Pertini, also present at the meeting, Tiengo was instrumental in blowing up the negotiations; according to both Achille Marazza, another CLN delegate who participated in the meeting, and General Renzo Montagna, who was part of the RSI delegation, Tiengo overheard Pertini telling the cardinal about his intention not to respect the proposals made to Mussolini to hand him over to the Western Allies, and warned the dictator, thus ending the negotiations. Tiengo did not follow Mussolini in his flight north later on that evening, and was found dead in Paullo on 11 May 1945; in his hand a piece of paper was found, on which he had written in pencil "I am Carlo Tiengo".
