= Settala =

Settala Settara (Lombard)
- Comune
- Comune di Settala
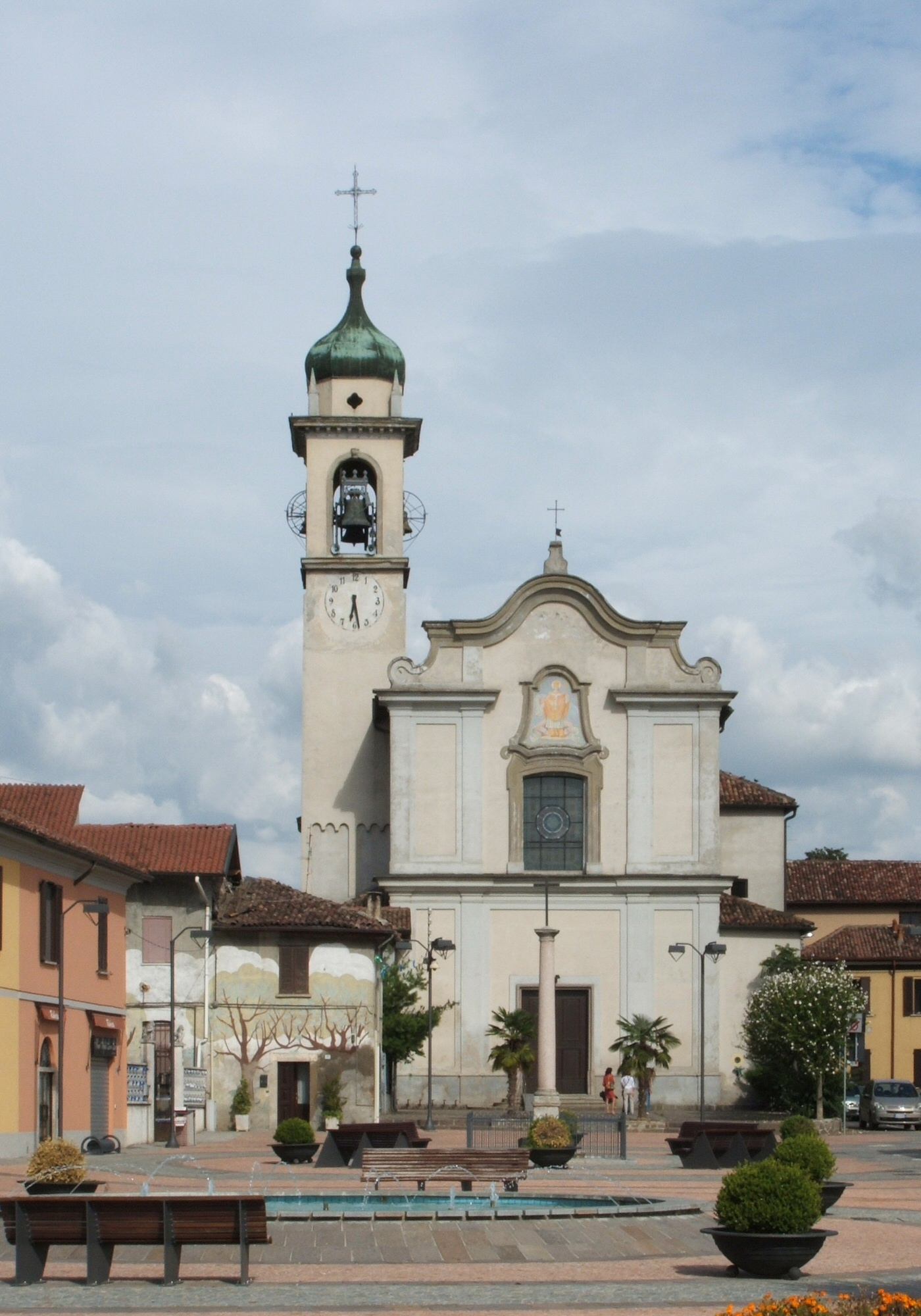
- The church of Settala

- Coat of arms

- Location within Italy Location within Lombardy
- Coordinates: 45°27′N 9°23′E
- Country: Italy
- Region: Lombardy
- Metropolitan city: Milan (MI)
- Frazioni: Premenugo, Caleppio

Area
  - Total: 17.5 km^{2} (6.8 sq mi)

Population (Dec. 2004)
  - Total: 6,460
  - Density: 369/km^{2} (956/sq mi)
- Demonym: Settalesi
- Time zone: UTC+1 (CET)
  - Summer (DST): UTC+2 (CEST)
- Postal code: 20049
- Dialing code: 02
- Website: Official website

Settala (Lombard: Settara [seˈtaːra]) is a comune (municipality) in the Province of Milan in the Italian region Lombardy, located about 15 kilometres (9 mi) east of Milan. As of 31 December 2004, it had a population of 6,460 and an area of 17.5 square kilometres (6.8 mi^{2}).

The municipality of Settala contains the frazioni (subdivisions, mainly villages and hamlets) Premenugo and Caleppio.

Settala borders the following municipalities: Vignate, Rodano, Liscate, Comazzo, Merlino, Pantigliate, Paullo, Mediglia.

== Demographic evolution ==
Historical population

| Year | Pop. | ±% |
|---|---|---|
| 1861 | 1,845 | — |
| 1871 | 1,934 | +4.8% |
| 1881 | 2,127 | +10.0% |
| 1901 | 2,168 | +1.9% |
| 1911 | 2,286 | +5.4% |

| Year | Pop. | ±% |
|---|---|---|
| 1921 | 2,439 | +6.7% |
| 1931 | 2,102 | −13.8% |
| 1936 | 2,282 | +8.6% |
| 1951 | 2,578 | +13.0% |
| 1961 | 2,399 | −6.9% |

| Year | Pop. | ±% |
|---|---|---|
| 1971 | 3,180 | +32.6% |
| 1981 | 4,327 | +36.1% |
| 1991 | 4,989 | +15.3% |
| 2001 | 5,790 | +16.1% |

Source: Data from ISTAT
