= Rivolta d'Adda =

- Comune
- Comune di Rivolta d'Adda
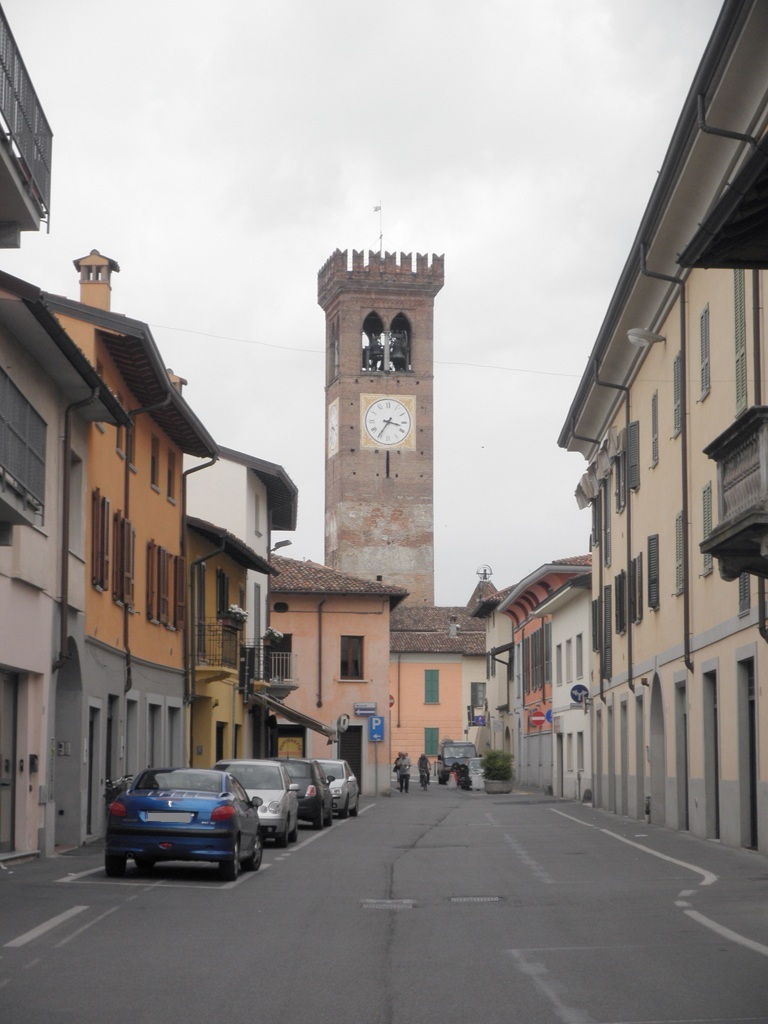

- Location within Italy Location within Lombardy
- Coordinates: 45°28′N 9°31′E
- Country: Italy
- Region: Lombardy
- Province: Cremona (CR)

Government
  - Mayor: Giovanni Sgroi

Area
  - Total: 30.4 km^{2} (11.7 sq mi)
- Elevation: 101 m (331 ft)

Population (31 December 2021)
  - Total: 8,108
  - Density: 267/km^{2} (691/sq mi)
- Demonym: Rivoltani
- Time zone: UTC+1 (CET)
  - Summer (DST): UTC+2 (CEST)
- Postal code: 26027
- Dialing code: 0363
- Website: Official website

Rivolta d'Adda (Lombard: Riólta) is a comune (municipality) in the Province of Cremona in the Italian region Lombardy, located about 25 kilometres (16 mi) east of Milan and about 70 kilometres (43 mi) northwest of Cremona.

Rivolta d'Adda borders the following municipalities: Agnadello, Arzago d'Adda, Casirate d'Adda, Cassano d'Adda, Comazzo, Merlino, Pandino, Spino d'Adda, Truccazzano. Sights include the church of San Sigismondo (11th century), the church of Santa Maria Immacolata (15th century), a Prehistoric Park with a museum and reconstruction of extinct prehistoric creatures.

== Interesting sites ==
Prehistoric Park, themed nature park located on the outskirts of the town itself, within the Adda Park.
