= Zelo Buon Persico =

Zelo Buon Persico Zel Bon Pèrsegh (Lombard)
- Comune
- Comune di Zelo Buon Persico
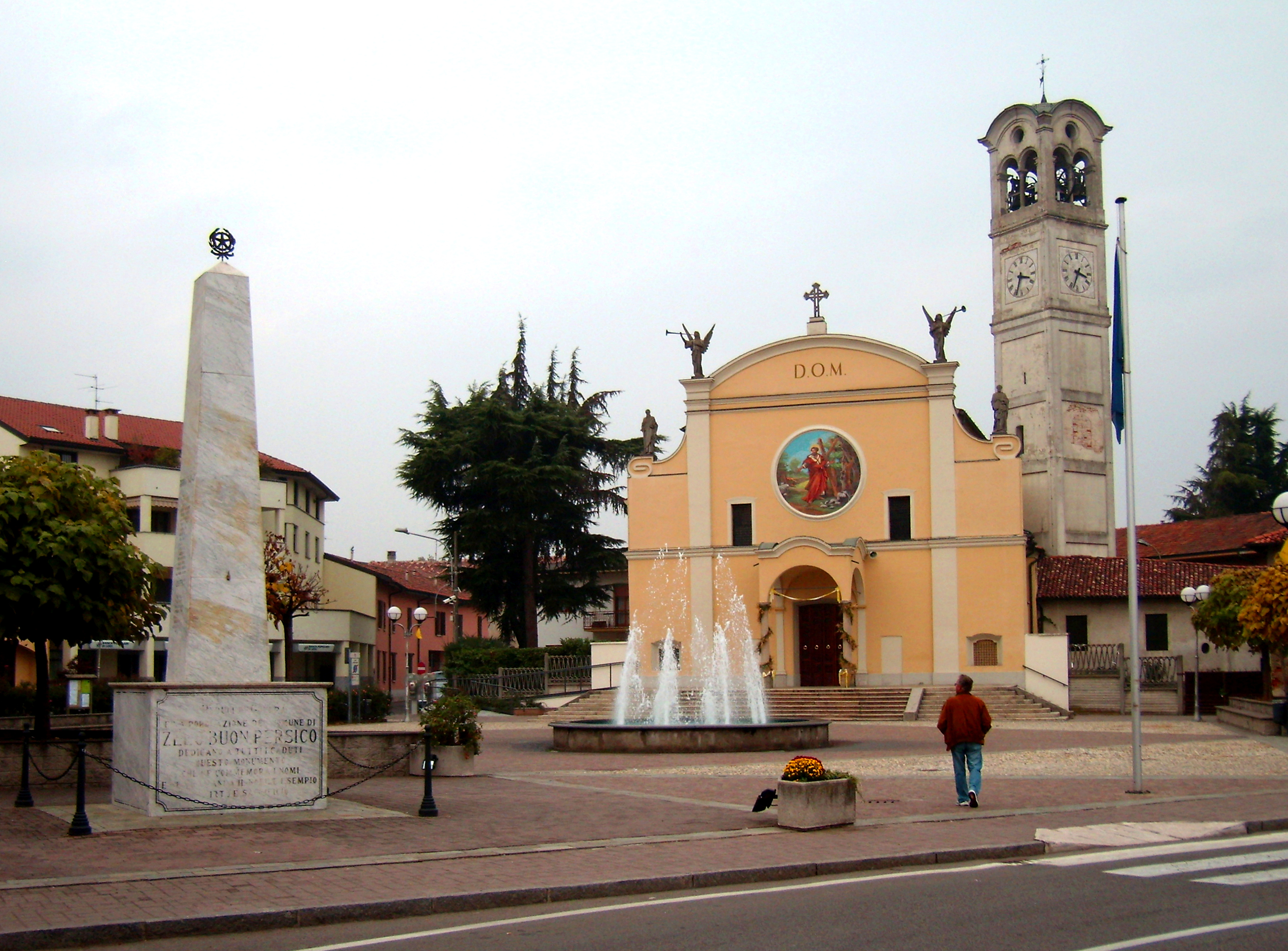

- Coat of arms

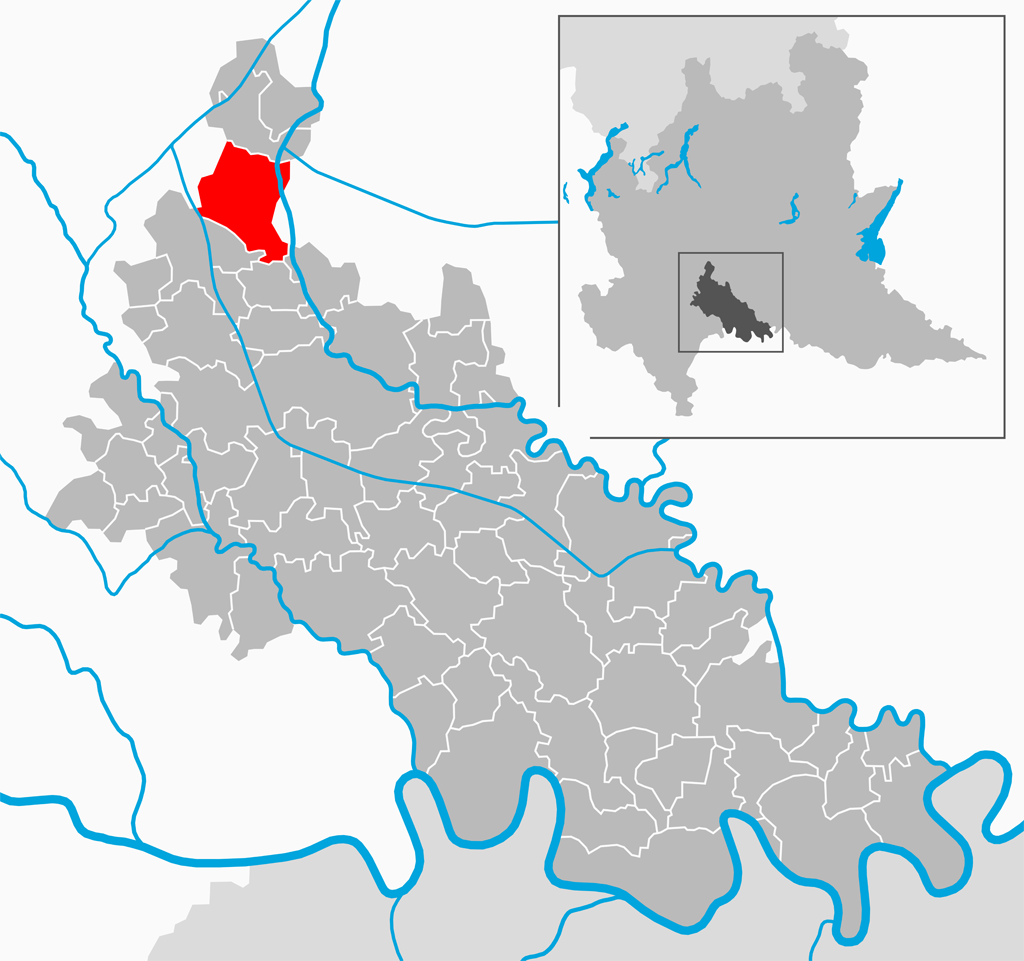

- Location within Italy Location within Lombardy
- Coordinates: 45°24′N 9°25′E
- Country: Italy
- Region: Lombardy
- Province: Lodi (LO)

Government
  - Mayor: Angelo Madonini

Area
  - Total: 18.7 km^{2} (7.2 sq mi)
- Elevation: 90 m (300 ft)

Population (1 January 2013)
  - Total: 7,003
  - Density: 374/km^{2} (970/sq mi)
- Demonym: Zelaschi
- Time zone: UTC+1 (CET)
  - Summer (DST): UTC+2 (CEST)
- Postal code: 26839
- Dialing code: 02
- Patron saint: St. Andrew
- Saint day: November 30
- Website: Official website

Zelo Buon Persico (Lombard: Zel Bon Pèrsegh) is a comune (municipality) in the Province of Lodi in the Italian region Lombardy, located about 45 kilometres (28 mi) southeast of Milan and about 20 kilometres (12 mi) southeast of Lodi.

Zelo Buon Persico borders the following municipalities: Merlino, Paullo, Spino d'Adda, Mulazzano, Cervignano d'Adda, Boffalora d'Adda, Galgagnano.
