= Amilcare Rossi =

Italian Fascist politician and soldier (1895–1977)

Undersecretary to the Presidency of the Council of Ministers of the Kingdom of Italy
- In office 6 February 1943 – 25 July 1943
- Preceded by: Luigi Russo
- Succeeded by: Pietro Baratono

Member of the Chamber of Deputies of the Kingdom of Italy
- In office 20 April 1929 – 2 March 1939

Member of the Chamber of Fasces and Corporations
- In office 23 March 1939 – 2 August 1943

Personal details
- Born: 1 January 1895 Lanuvio, Kingdom of Italy
- Died: 31 May 1977 (aged 82) Rome, Italy
- Party: National Fascist Party
- Civilian awards: Order of the Crown of Italy; Order of the White Lion

Military service
- Allegiance: Kingdom of Italy
- Branch/service: Royal Italian Army
- Rank: Lieutenant Colonel
- Battles/wars: World War I; Battles of the Isonzo; Second Italo-Ethiopian War; Battle of Amba Aradam; World War II; Battle of the Western Alps; Greco-Italian War
- Military awards: Gold Medal of Military Valor; Silver Medal of Military Valor; War Cross for Military Valor (twice)

Amilcare Rossi (Lanuvio, 1 January 1895 – Rome, 31 May 1977) was an Italian soldier and Fascist politician, recipient of the Gold Medal of Military Valor, who served as the last Undersecretary to the Presidency of the Council of the Mussolini Cabinet, from 6 February to 25 July 1943.

== Biography ==
Holder of two degrees, in Law and in Literature and Philosophy, he worked as a lawyer and high school teacher. A nationalist and interventist, he took part in the First World War as a junior officer in the 28th Infantry Regiment ("Pavia" Brigade), fighting on Sabotin and participating in the capture of Gorizia. On 10 October 1916 he earned the Gold Medal of Military Valor for an action near Vrtojba at the beginning of the Eighth Battle of the Isonzo; having volunteered to lead a wiring party, he thrice placed explosive tubes under Austro-Hungarian barbed wire in daylight under enemy fire, then returned to cut a gap through the barbed wire with wire cutters and led the subsequent assault, being wounded but keeping fighting until he was wounded a gain, suffering a broken femur and later returning to the frontline at his request before being fully healed. In March 1918 he was promoted to captain.

Having joined the National Fascist Party in 1923, in the early 1920s he was chosen by the government as a member of the Jurisdictional Commission for the assets of former enemies. On 2 March 1925 he was appointed president of the regency of the National Veterans Association, of which he later became president from 1927 to 1943. In the same year he was among the promoters and founders of the Gold Medals Group of the Nastro Azzurro Institute (an association among the recipients of awards for military valor), of which he would later become national president. From 1927 to 1928 he was federal secretary of the National Fascist Party of Terni, on 20 April 1929 he became a member of the Italian Chamber of Deputies and on 23 March 1939 of the Chamber of Fasces and Corporations.

He fought in the Second Italo-Ethiopian War, with the rank of major attached to the 5th Alpine Division "Pusteria" as a battalion commander (receiving a Silver Medal of Military Valor for his conduct during the battle of Amba Aradam, where he was slightly wounded, and a War Cross for Military Valor), and then in the Second World War, on the Italian-French front (where he received another War Cross for Military Valor) and later in Albania, with the rank of lieutenant colonel in the 50th Infantry Regiment. From 6 February to 25 July 1943 he was the last Undersecretary to the Presidency of the Council of Ministers of the Mussolini Cabinet. After the armistice of Cassibile he retired to private life. In 1946 he was tried as a former member of the Fascist regime, but was acquitted with full formula. He continued to work as a lawyer and in 1969 he wrote the memoir Figlio del mio tempo, dying in Rome in 1977.
