= Dino Philipson =

Italian lawyer and politician (1889–1972)

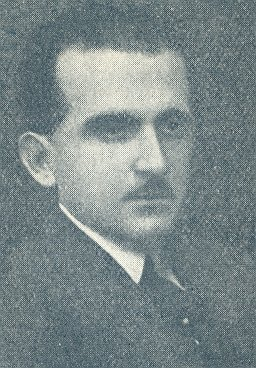
- Dino Philipson while serving in the XXVth legislature in the 1920s

Secretary of the Council of Ministers
- In office February 1944 – April 1944
- Prime Minister: Pietro Badoglio
- Preceded by: Pietro Baratono
- Succeeded by: Renato Morelli

Personal details
- Born: 1889 Florence, Kingdom of Italy
- Died: 1972 (aged 82–83) Pistoia, Italy
- Party: Liberal Party
- Parents: Edoardo Philipson (father); Sophie Rodrigues Pereire (mother)

Dino Philipson (1889–1972) was an Italian lawyer and anti-Fascist politician who was a member of the Liberal Party. During the Fascist rule he left Italy, but then returned to the country and was arrested by the Fascist authorities.

== Early life and education ==
Philipson was born in Florence in 1889. His father, Edoardo Philipson, was an engineer who was one of the most influential members of the Florentine Jewish Community of the nineteenth century, and builder of Villa Philipson in Pistoia. Philipson was the business partner of Ubaldino Peruzzi who served as the minister of public works for two terms. His mother was Sophie Rodrigues Pereire, daughter of Isaac Pereire, who was a French banker of Sephardi descent from Portugal.

Dino Philipson was raised in Pistoia and obtained a bachelor's degree in law and social sciences in Florence. Following the start of World War I he was enlisted in the army and was later promoted to the rank of lieutenant.

== Career and activities ==
In 1919 Philipson became the president of the Pistoia section of the National Combatants and Veterans Association. The same year he was elected as a deputy from Florence on the list called Liberal Concentration. In the 1921 elections he was also elected to the Parliament from the National Bloc. Later he joined the Liberal Democratic Union. When the Kingdom of Italy totally became under the Fascist rule from 1922 Philipson left the country for Paris, France. There he had connections with the liberal and moderate anti-Fascism movements.

Philipson returned to Italy in the mid-1930s. He and Eugenio Coloroni were arrested by the OVRA (Italian secret police) in October 1938. Philipson detained in the Tremiti Islands for three years and then, was transferred to Sala Consilina and Eboli in southern Campania. After the fall of the Fascist rule he was freed and was appointed undersecretary to Prime Minister Pietro Badoglio in February 1944, but his term was very brief and ended in April 1944. Next Philipson was appointed member of the National Council, the forerunner of the Italian Parliament. He retired from politics and devoted himself to his legal profession and freemasonry.

Philipson died in Pistoia in 1972.
