= Prehistoric Park (Italy) =

Italian naturalistic park

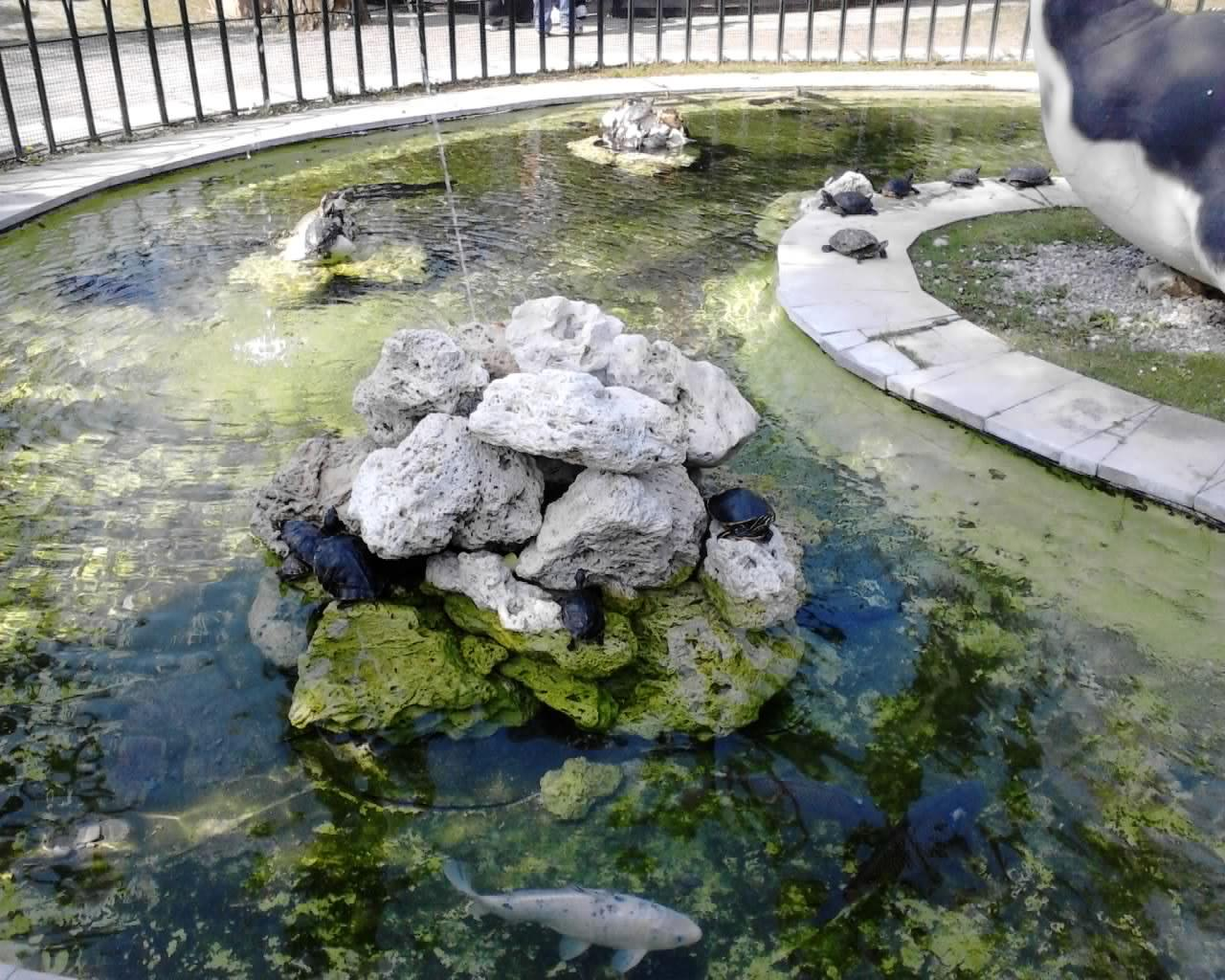
- Turtles and koi carp in a fountain.
- Interactive map of Prehistoric Park
- 45°28′25.40″N 9°29′58.78″E
- Date opened: 1978
- Location: Rivolta d'Adda, Italy
- Land area: 100.000 m2
- Website: Official website

The Prehistoric Park (in Italian language: Parco della Preistoria) is an Italian naturalistic park of more than 100 hectares of wood, situated on the outskirts of the Rivolta d'Adda commune, Cremona province, about 20 kilometers east of Milan. The park is adjacent to the homonym Adda river and contains 30 reconstructions of prehistoric animals (including prehistoric men), a hundred semi-liberty wild animals, a botanical itinerary with plants signalled, natural environments (as: a swamp, lawns, lakes, etc.), picnic reggeds areas, a café, playing parks, a labyrinth, and shows of fossils, etc., all along a shaded course. The access to the park is exclusively pedestrian, but access is allowed to bicycles and dogs with leashes. The park is also recognized by various national and local corporate bodies that testify to the validity of the structure as a guide to the environmental education, not only to children, but of adults as well.

== History of the park ==
Construction of the park began in March 1976, and lasted for two years. From '76-'78, besides the jobs of realization, were added the prehistorical animal reconstructions, realized with scientific attention to detail, to seemingly recreate true animals. In fact, it was possible to create these reconstructions, beginning from the fossils of skeletons that were recovered in various international sites, and then by the study and analysis of the details of musculature, tissues, and skin; in this way, it was possible to create models in miniature, which were then reconstructioned in fibreglass, to recreate them in their natural greatness, just as these animals appeared millions of years ago. Important events in the park's history have been:

- September 1978: opening and inauguration of the park
- 1982: inauguration of the show fossils and mineral
- 1988: insertion of new visitors capacity improvement structures
- 2000: insertion of new reconstructions of prehistoric animals
- 2009: inauguration of the paleontological museum
- 2013: insertion of the Saltriosaurus;Saltriosaurus
- 2016: insertion of the Ticinosuchus and the titanosaur
- 2017: insertion of the Smilodon;Smilodon
- 2019: insertion of the Diplodocus;Diplodocus
- 2023: insertion of the Spinosaurus, movement of the Allosaurus next to the Stegosaurus and reversal of location between Saltriovenator and Scolosaurus.

== Botany ==
=== Park flora ===
Along the left bank of the Adda, the park offers a variety of vegetation and partially wooded formations. The forests of Northern Italy have been subject, for many centuries, to the various agricultural activities of reclamations and deforestations. However, in this line of the river it is, in fact, possible to experience the last hems of the primordial forest, characterized by deciduous leaf trees. The park wood entertains an intermixed variety of trees, such as: poplars, elms, locust trees, etc. The park features a proliferation of wild plants (such as violets, primroses, hawthorns, etc.) and other ancestral cultivations; its brushwood is invaluable.

=== Wood ===
The park wood is a mixture of latileaves deciduous trees. The forest structure is divided into three layers: arboreal, shrubby, and grassy. The arboreal layer consists of tall trees (over 15 m on average). The trees foliage of this layer accord an intermittent coverage, giving the impression of an open forest. The shrubby layer is characterized by plants to varying height (from 1 to 7 m). The grassy layer is constituted by various ground plants, including climbing plants, such as ivy.

=== The swamp ===
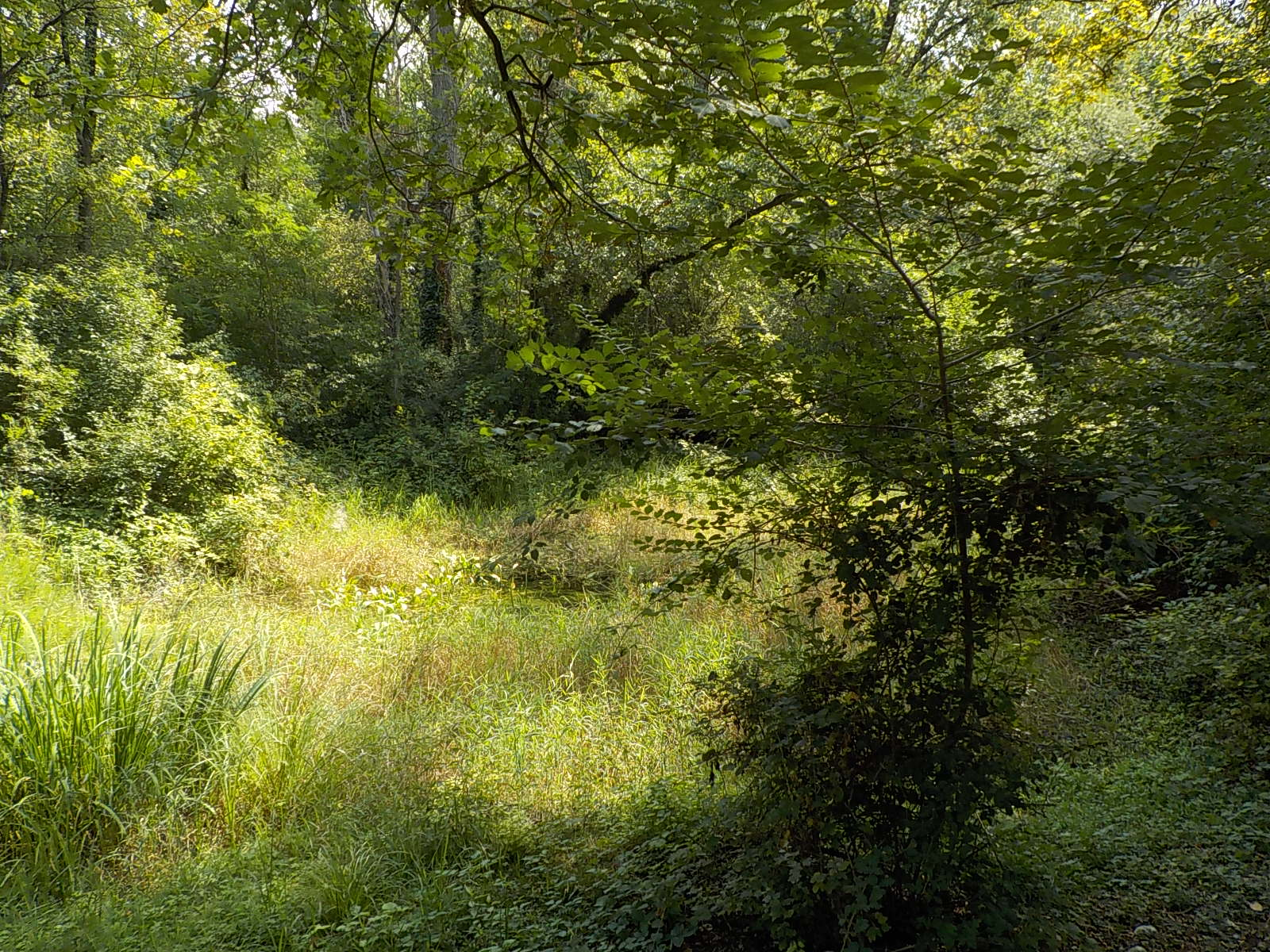
Vegetation in the park swamp.

In the final part of the course, there is a swamp, bordering on the nearby herons lake (lago degli aironi). It is characterized by an ample curve, evolved in the time with the detachment from the quoted lake (meander). Here it is possible to admire the great variety of vegetation, characterized by: willows and larches; and aquatic vegetation, characterized by: water lilies, nasturtiums, etc.; in the muddy parts are noticed: cattails and marshy reeds. The rest of the vegetation, present in the center of the swamp, includes submerged plants, cried plants, semicried plants, and reeds.

== Reconstructions ==
List of the 32 reconstructions of the kinds on the basis in the order by which the appear along the course.

- Ticinosuchus
- Titanosaur
- Pterygotus
- Cephalaspis and Coccosteus
- Eryops
- Dimetrodon
- Moschops
- Inostrancevia and Scutosaurus
- Plesiosaurus
- Allosaurus and Stegosaurus
- Saltriovenator
- Brontosaurus
- Triceratops
- Spinosaurus
- Styracosaurus and Gallimimus
- Scolosaurus and Iguanodon
- Edmontosaurus
- Tyrannosaurus
- Velociraptor
- Tarbosaurus
- Proconsul, Australopithecus and Cro-Magnon man
- Gastornis, Smilodon, Platybelodon and Machairodus
- Pteranodon
- Cave bear
- Woolly Mammoth
- Neanderthal man
- Diplodocus
