= Galgagnano =

Galgagnano Galgagnàn (Lombard)
- Comune
- Comune di Galgagnano
- Coat of arms

- Location within Italy Location within Lombardy
- Coordinates: 45°10′N 9°35′E
- Country: Italy
- Region: Lombardy
- Province: Lodi (LO)

Government
  - Mayor: Roberto Ciriello

Area
  - Total: 6.01 km^{2} (2.32 sq mi)
- Elevation: 86 m (282 ft)

Population (31 August 2017)
  - Total: 1,251
  - Density: 208/km^{2} (539/sq mi)
- Demonym: Galgagnanesi
- Time zone: UTC+1 (CET)
  - Summer (DST): UTC+2 (CEST)
- Postal code: 26832
- Dialing code: 0371
- Website: Official website

Galgagnano (Lodigiano: Galgagnàn) is a comune (municipality) in the Province of Lodi in the Italian region Lombardy, located about 45 kilometres (28 mi) southeast of Milan and about 5 kilometres (3.1 mi) northwest of Lodi.

Galgagnano borders the following municipalities: Zelo Buon Persico, Mulazzano, Cervignano d'Adda, Boffalora d'Adda, Montanaso Lombardo.
