= Mulazzano =

Mulazzano Mülassàn (Lombard)
- Comune
- Comune di Mulazzano
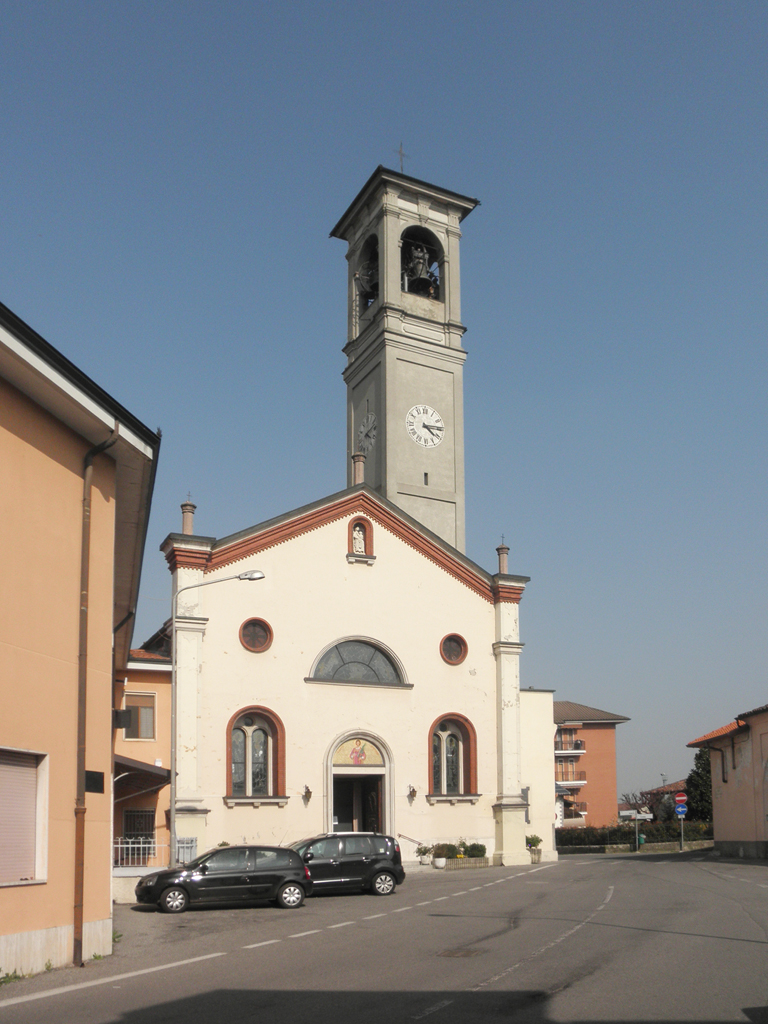
- Church

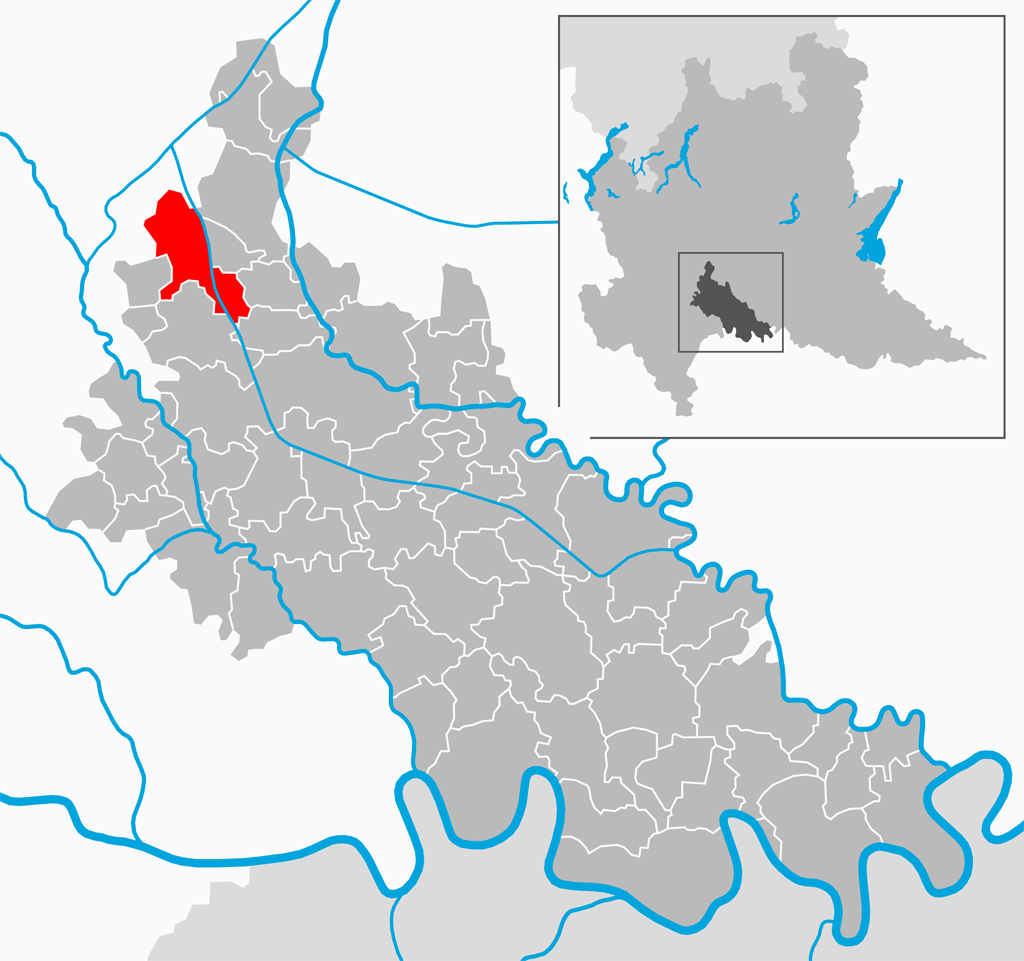

- Location within Italy Location within Lombardy
- Coordinates: 45°10′N 9°35′E
- Country: Italy
- Region: Lombardy
- Province: Lodi (LO)

Government
  - Mayor: Abele Guerini

Area
  - Total: 15.58 km^{2} (6.02 sq mi)
- Elevation: 91 m (299 ft)

Population (30 November 2017)
  - Total: 5,775
  - Density: 370.7/km^{2} (960.0/sq mi)
- Demonym: Mulazzanesi
- Time zone: UTC+1 (CET)
  - Summer (DST): UTC+2 (CEST)
- Postal code: 26837
- Dialing code: 02
- Website: Official website

Mulazzano (Italian pronunciation: [mulatˈtsaːno]; Lodigiano: Mülassàn [mylaˈsãː]) is a comune (municipality) in the Province of Lodi in the Italian region Lombardy, located about 45 kilometres (28 mi) southeast of Milan and about 20 kilometres (12 mi) northeast of Lodi.

Mulazzano borders the following municipalities: Paullo, Zelo Buon Persico, Tribiano, Dresano, Cervignano d'Adda, Casalmaiocco, Galgagnano, Tavazzano con Villavesco and Montanaso Lombardo.
