= Comazzo =

Comazzo Comass (Lombard)
- Comune
- Comune di Comazzo
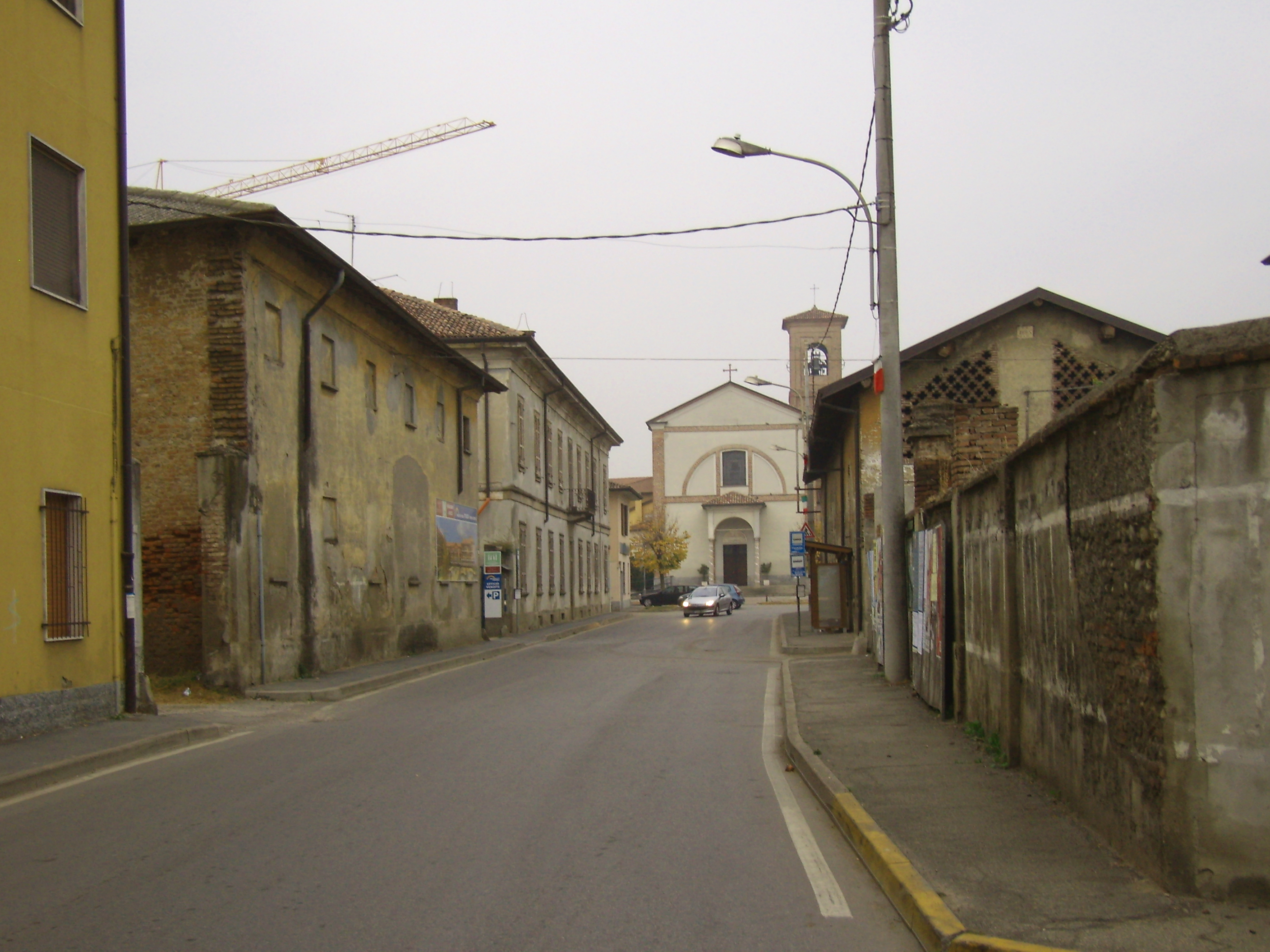

- Coat of arms

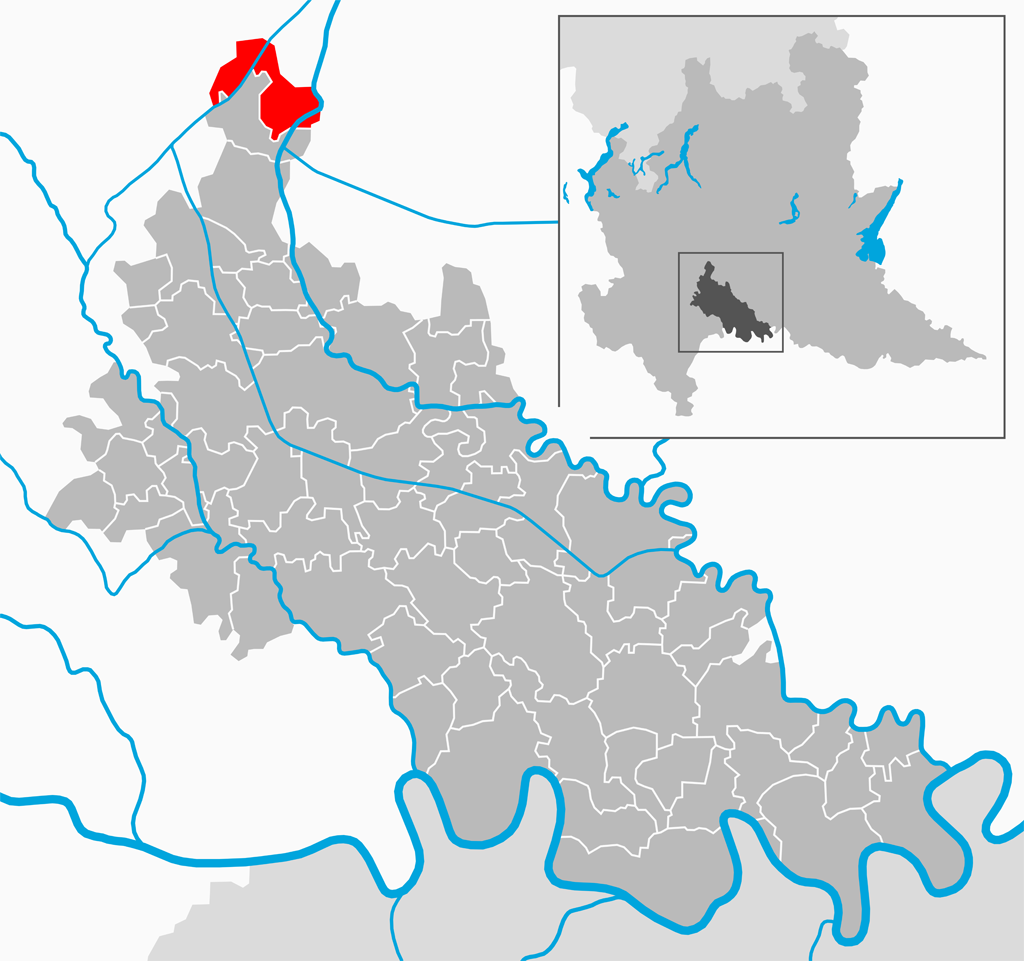

- Location within Italy Location within Lombardy
- Coordinates: 45°29′N 9°25′E
- Country: Italy
- Region: Lombardy
- Province: Lodi (LO)
- Frazioni: Lavagna

Government
  - Mayor: Italo Vicardi

Area
  - Total: 12.7 km^{2} (4.9 sq mi)

Population (31 December 2008)
  - Total: 2,003
  - Density: 158/km^{2} (408/sq mi)
- Time zone: UTC+1 (CET)
  - Summer (DST): UTC+2 (CEST)
- Postal code: 26833
- Dialing code: 02
- Website: Official website

Comazzo (Lombard: Comass [kuˈmas]) is a comune (municipality) in the Province of Lodi in the Italian region Lombardy, located about 20 kilometres (12 mi) east of Milan and about 20 kilometres (12 mi) northwest of Lodi. Per 2016 figures, town had a total inhabitants of 2,244.

Comazzo borders the following municipalities: Truccazzano, Rivolta d'Adda, Liscate, Settala, Merlino.
