= Spino d'Adda =

- Comune
- Comune di Spino d'Adda
- Location within Italy Location within Lombardy
- Coordinates: 45°24′N 9°30′E
- Country: Italy
- Region: Lombardy
- Province: Cremona (CR)

Government
  - Mayor: Luigi Poli

Area
  - Total: 20.02 km^{2} (7.73 sq mi)
- Elevation: 84 m (276 ft)

Population (30 November 2016)
  - Total: 6,829
  - Density: 341.1/km^{2} (883.5/sq mi)
- Demonym: Spinesi
- Time zone: UTC+1 (CET)
  - Summer (DST): UTC+2 (CEST)
- Postal code: 26016
- Dialing code: 0373
- Website: Official website

Spino d'Adda (Cremasco: Spì) is a comune (municipality) in the Province of Cremona in the Italian region Lombardy, located about 25 kilometres (16 mi) southeast of Milan and about 50 kilometres (31 mi) northwest of Cremona.

Spino d'Adda borders the following municipalities: Boffalora d'Adda, Dovera, Merlino, Pandino, Rivolta d'Adda, Zelo Buon Persico.

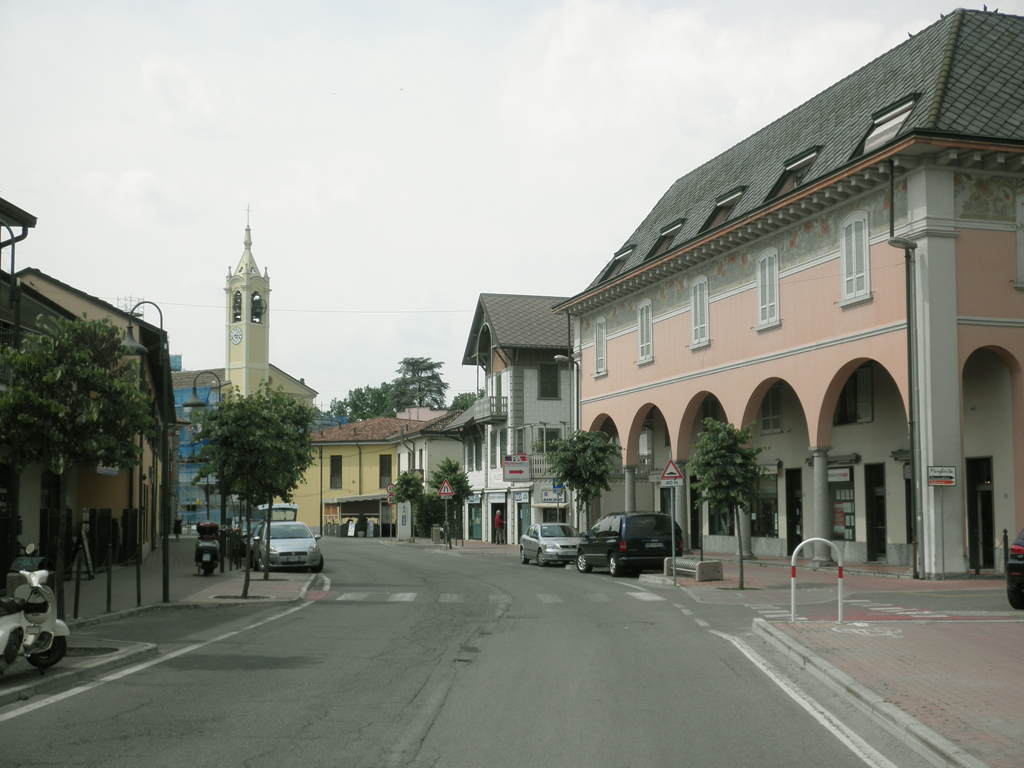
