= Cervignano d'Adda =

- Comune
- Comune di Cervignano d'Adda
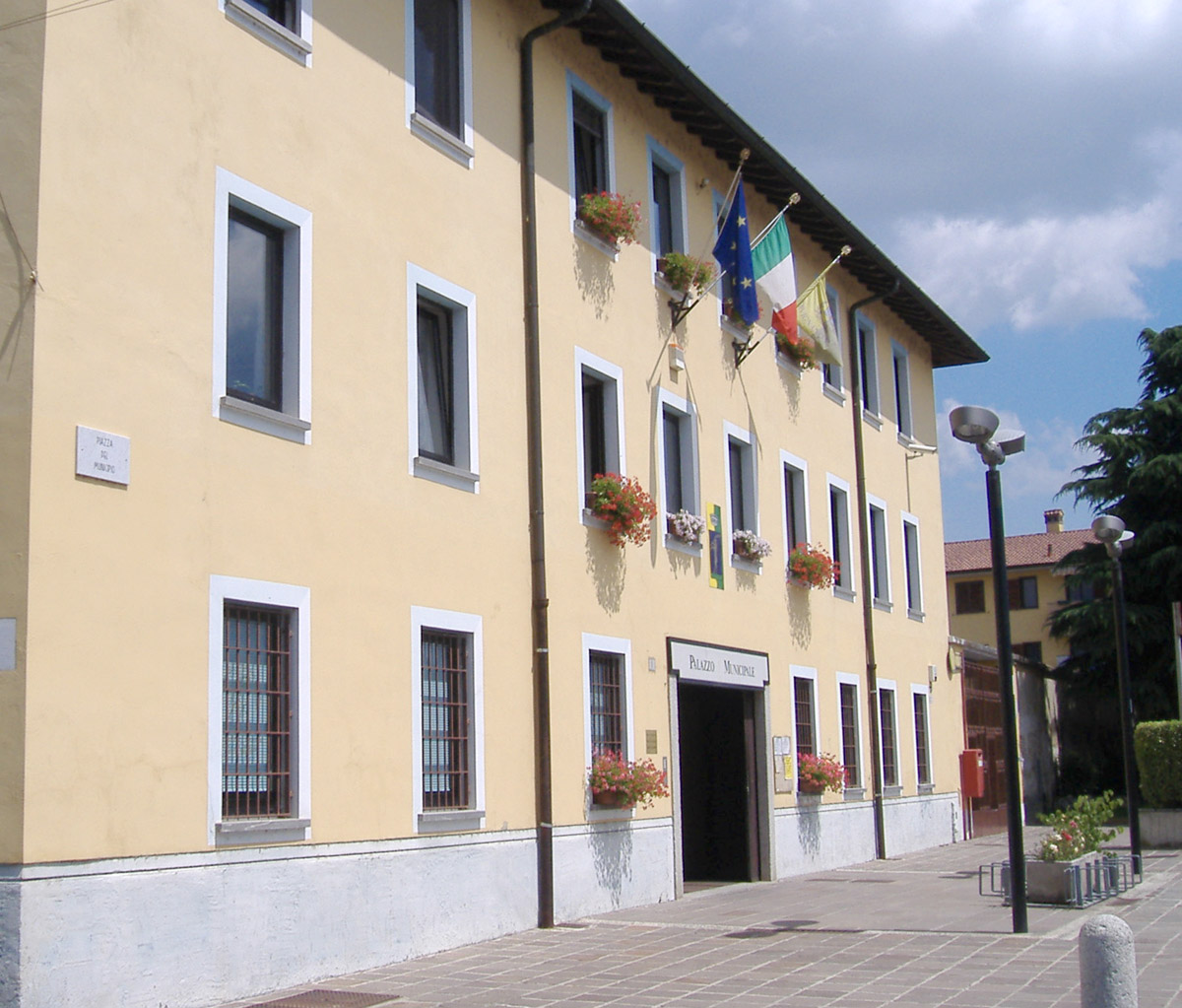
- Town hall.

- Coat of arms

- Location within Italy Location within Lombardy
- Coordinates: 45°10′N 9°35′E
- Country: Italy
- Region: Lombardy
- Province: Lodi (LO)

Government
  - Mayor: Maria Pia Mazzucco

Area
  - Total: 4.1 km^{2} (1.6 sq mi)
- Elevation: 87 m (285 ft)

Population (30 June 2017)
  - Total: 2,172
  - Density: 530/km^{2} (1,400/sq mi)
- Demonym: Cervignanini
- Time zone: UTC+1 (CET)
  - Summer (DST): UTC+2 (CEST)
- Postal code: 26832
- Dialing code: 02
- Patron saint: St. Alexander Martyr
- Saint day: Last Sunday in August
- Website: Official website

Cervignano d'Adda (Lodigiano: Cervignan) is a comune (municipality) in the Province of Lodi in the Italian region Lombardy, located about 45 kilometres (28 mi) southeast of Milan and about 20 kilometres (12 mi) southeast of Lodi.

Cervignano d'Adda borders the following municipalities: Zelo Buon Persico, Mulazzano, Galgagnano.
