= Paullo =

Paullo Paù (Lombard)
- Comune
- Città di Paullo
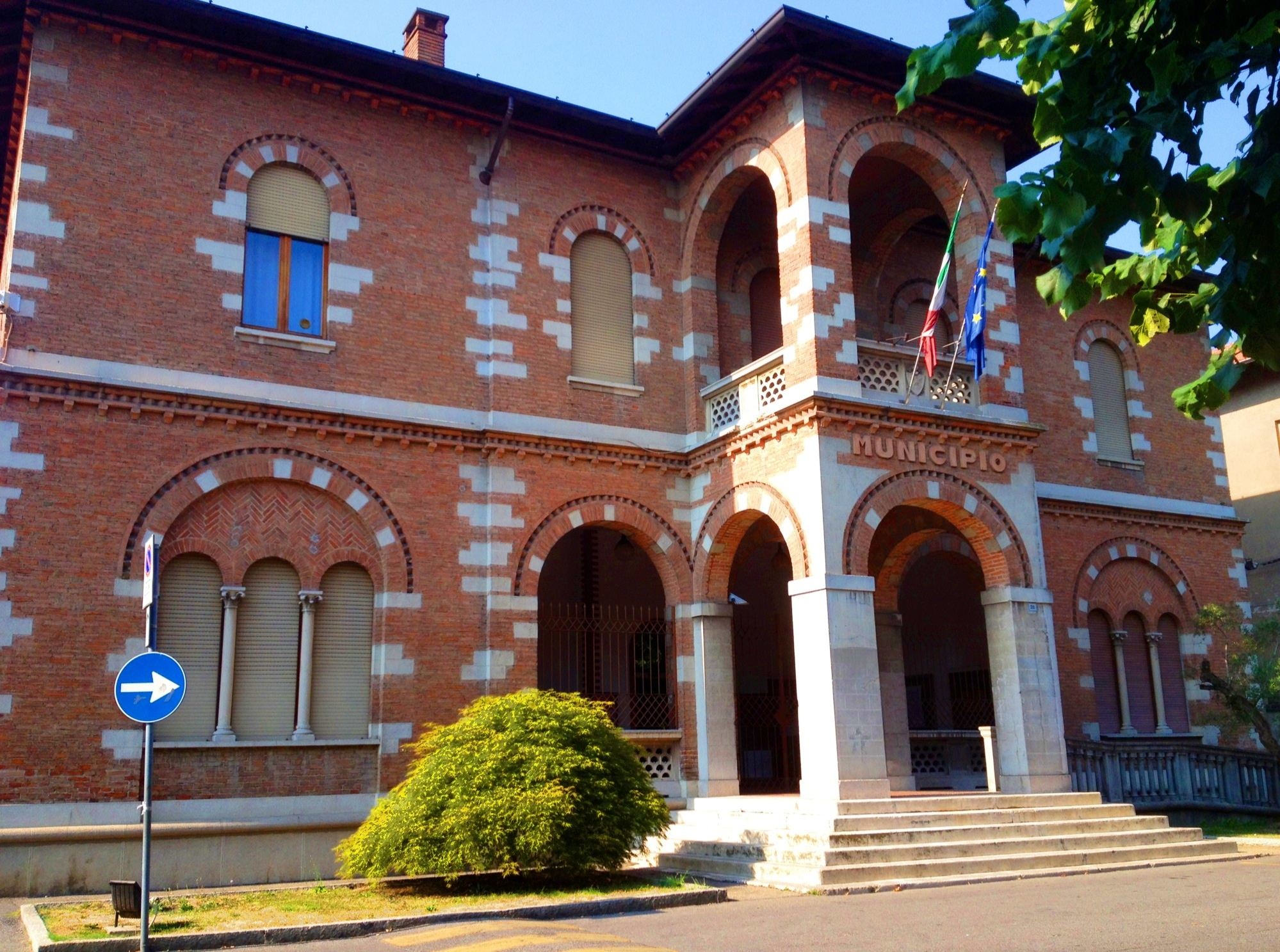

- Coat of arms

- Location within Italy Location within Lombardy
- Coordinates: 45°25′N 9°24′E
- Country: Italy
- Region: Lombardy
- Metropolitan city: Milan (MI)
- Frazioni: Conterico

Government
  - Mayor: Federico Lorenzini

Area
  - Total: 8.9 km^{2} (3.4 sq mi)
- Elevation: 97 m (318 ft)

Population (Nov. 2013)
  - Total: 11,291
  - Density: 1,300/km^{2} (3,300/sq mi)
- Demonym: Paullesi
- Time zone: UTC+1 (CET)
  - Summer (DST): UTC+2 (CEST)
- Postal code: 20067
- Dialing code: 02
- Patron saint: Quirico b and Giulitta
- Website: www.comune.paullo.mi.it (Italian)

Paullo (Lombard: Paull [paˈyl], locally Paù [paˈy]) is a comune (municipality) in the Metropolitan City of Milan in the Italian region Lombardy, located about 10 kilometres (6 mi) southeast of Milan. As of 30 April 2014, it had a population of 11,333 and an area of 8.9 square kilometres (3.4 mi^{2}).

Paullo borders the following municipalities: Mediglia, Merlino, Mulazzano, Settala, Tribiano, Zelo Buon Persico. It received the honorary title of city with a presidential decree on April 2, 2009.

A projected extension of Milan Metro line 3 to Paullo is currently on hold, awaiting funding.

== Demographic evolution ==
Historical population

Year	Pop.	±%
1861	1,807	—
1871	1,983	+9.7%
1881	2,015	+1.6%
1901	2,219	+10.1%
1911	2,460	+10.9%

Year	Pop.	±%
1921	2,473	+0.5%
1931	2,707	+9.5%
1936	2,864	+5.8%
1951	3,259	+13.8%
1961	4,461	+36.9%

Year	Pop.	±%
1971	6,655	+49.2%
1981	7,851	+18.0%
1991	9,613	+22.4%
2001	10,108	+5.1%

Source: Data from ISTAT
