= Boffalora d'Adda =

- Comune
- Comune di Boffalora d'Adda
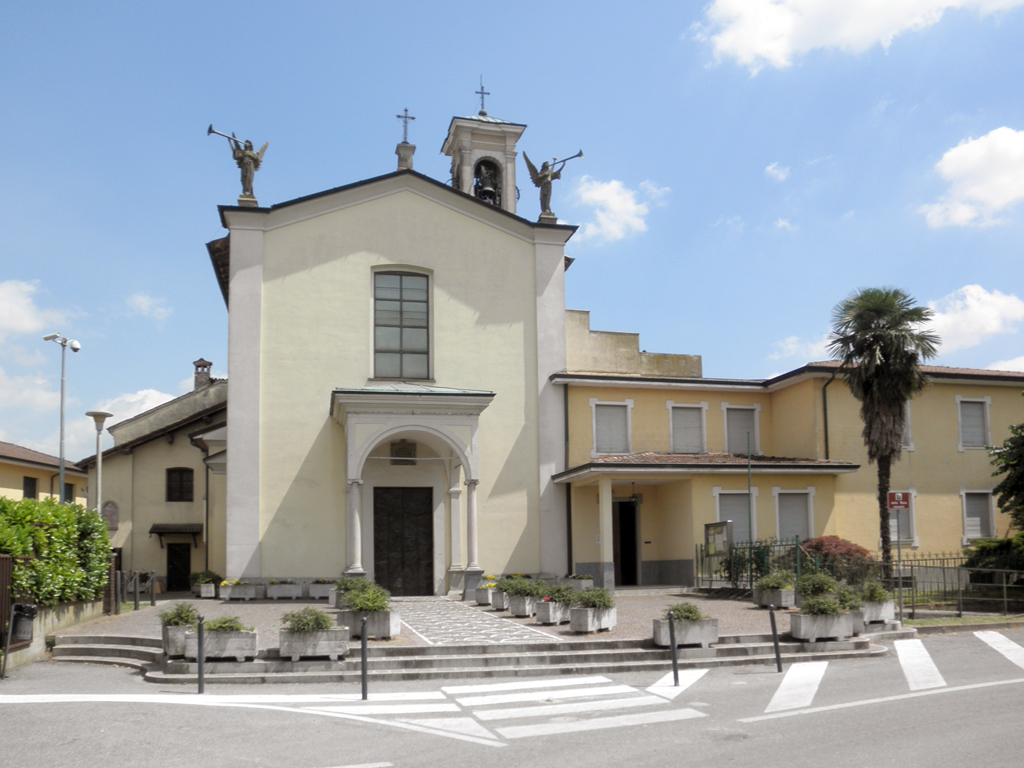
- The parish church in Boffalora d'Adda

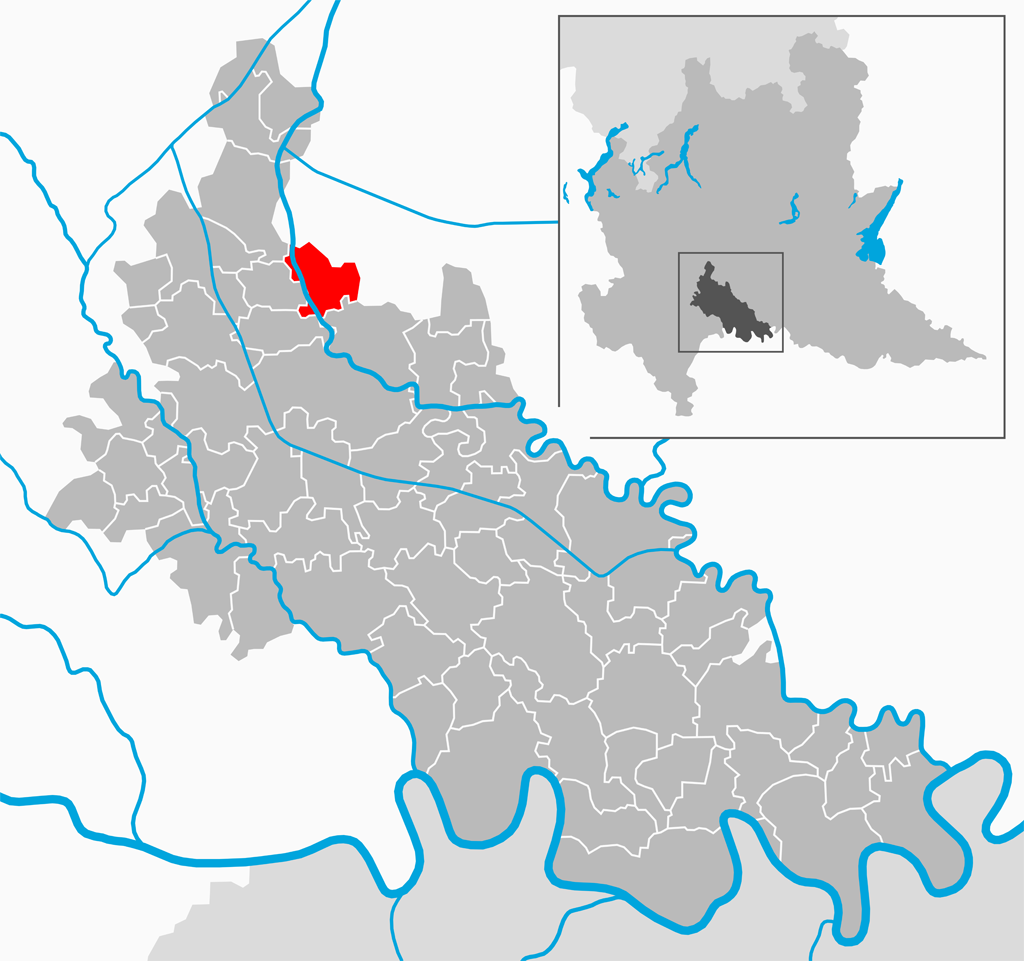

- Location within Italy Location within Lombardy
- Coordinates: 45°21′N 9°29′E
- Country: Italy
- Region: Lombardy
- Province: Lodi (LO)

Government
  - Mayor: Livio Bossi

Area
  - Total: 8.13 km^{2} (3.14 sq mi)
- Elevation: 78 m (256 ft)

Population (30 April 2017)
  - Total: 1,734
  - Density: 213/km^{2} (552/sq mi)
- Demonym: Boffaloresi
- Time zone: UTC+1 (CET)
  - Summer (DST): UTC+2 (CEST)
- Postal code: 26811
- Dialing code: 0371
- Website: Official website

Boffalora d'Adda (Lodigiano: Bufalòra) is a comune (municipality) in the Province of Lodi in the Italian region Lombardy, located about 30 kilometres (19 mi) southeast of Milan and about 4 kilometres (2 mi) northwest of Lodi.

Boffalora d'Adda borders the following municipalities: Zelo Buon Persico, Spino d'Adda, Dovera, Galgagnano, Lodi, Montanaso Lombardo.
