= Walter Tobagi =

Italian journalist and writer

Walter Tobagi (18 March 1947 – 28 May 1980) was an Italian journalist and writer. He was killed in a terrorist attack by the Brigade XXVIII March, a left-wing terrorist group.

== Biography ==
=== Youth ===
Walter Tobagi was born on 18 March 1947 in San Brizio, a neighborhood of the Italian district of Spoleto in Umbria, Italy. As an eight-year-old child he moved with his family in Bresso, close to the Italian city of Milan, mainly because of his father's work as a railway worker. His career as a journalist began during his early high school years, as the editor of the Parini high school's newspaper La zanzara, which became notorious for a trial against an article regarding sex education.

=== Career ===
Right after having finished the high school Tobagi got hired at the Avanti of Milan, even though he only remained for a few months to pass to the catholic newspaper Avvenire.

Both at the Avanti! and at the Avvenire he focused on different topics, while he was slowly defining his interest for social themes, for the information, for the politics and the union movement, on which he dedicated lot of attention also in his "parallel" work as a researcher and professor. The first extensive inquiry published on the Avvenire was about the student movement in Milan, four different episodes of history, analysis, opinions about the little groups of students and the fights of the student movement in those years, an inquiry which represented the foundation for a more kind of organic and wide work published in 1970 by Sugar titled as Storia del Movimento Studentesco e dei marxisti-leninisti in Italia.

But he did not neglect economics themes realizing inquests in different installments about the pharmaceutical industry, the research, the press, the publishing industry and more. In those same years he showed to be interested also about the foreign policy, particularly about India, China, the Middle East, Spain, the eve of the Francoism withdrawal, the war in Chad, the Tunisian economic and political crisis, the human rights violations in the Greek military junta and the Algerian political perspectives.

Anyway, the major commitment led him to dedicate himself mainly to terrorism events, beginning with Giangiacomo Feltrinelli's death and the assassination of Luigi Calabresi. He also got interested about the first military initiatives of the Red Brigades, to the terrorist dens discovered in Milan, the relationship with the police chief Allitto Bonanno and to the guerrilla warfare which was producing uproars and deaths around Milan's streets, organised by radical small groups Lotta Continua, Potere Operaio, Avanguardia Operaia.

He then passed to the Corriere d'Informazione and, in 1972, to the Corriere della Sera, where he had the opportunity of expressing completely his potential as a reporter about terrorism and as a political chronicler.

Right after the Corriere della Sera all the events bounded to the years of lead followed: since the times of the autoriduttori who disturbed the Festa de l'Unità, to the violent episodes that saw as protagonists the Red Brigades, Prima Linea and other gangs. Analyzing the episodes Walter Tobagi was able to go back to the origins of Potere Operaio, with the incredible number of political and individual stories which ended up splitting in thousands of groups, much of which arrived to the gangs.

In Vivere e morire da giudice in Milan, Walter told the story of Emilio Alessandrini, deputy prosecutor of the Republic, murdered when he was only 36 by Front Line during an ambush: a magistrate who particularly stood out in the investigations about the radical groups of the Right wing, and subsequently, about those of the left wing. Alessandrini was an emblematic character as Tobagi said: "Alessandrini represented that section of progressive but uncompromising judges, neither chatty hawks nor pliable doves". He also pointed out that the terrorists used to target above all the reformers, sharing a judgement which Alessandrini himself expressed in an interview to the Avanti!: "it is not a coincidence that the actions of the brigades are mainly addressed to the progressives and not to the right wing's men. Their purpose is understandable: reaching the clash as soon as possible, getting rid of that small reformer section that, in a certain way, is guaranteeing the survival of this kind of society". A judgement that was going to be tragically confirmed by the murder of Tobagi.

In his last articles Tobagi focused his attention on the analysis of certain urban realities in Milan, Genoa and Turin ( "How and why a "terrorism laboratory" settled down in the ancient village of Ticino", "They want death to appear alive themselves", "A budget of ten billions per year for a thousand of clandestine executors", etc.). He didn't neglect the phenomenon of pentitismo, with all the sides that came with it, both negatives and positives, and studied the terrorist in its clandestine nature. We are talking about one of his very last articles which was published and republished multiple times because of its fame as one of the most significant ones.

Tobagi dispelled many cliches about the Red Brigades and the other armed gangs, reporting, another time, the danger of a radical terrorist phenomenon inside the industries and in other place of work, as many signs had suggested him.

His opinions turned out to be confirmed by another significant interview to Carlo Casalegno's son, Andrea. In that interview, which had been appointed a month before the murder of Tobagi, Casalegno said: "I cannot feel any trace of hate, neither I feel any christian forgiveness. I only feel the offence exactly as in the moment it happened". The interviewer asked whether he considered fair denouncing the "fight's fellows". And Andrea Casalegno answered without any reticence: "Denouncing is important and it is necessary if it helps preventing future serious problems. It's a duty because it is absolutely necessary avoiding innocent victims".

The night before being murdered, Walter Tobagi was hosting a meeting at the Circle of the Milan press. They were talking about the "Isman case" and so of the press freedom and of the responsibility of the journalist facing up to the offence of the terrorist gangs. The debate was pretty agitated and the Corriere's reporters were subject to many different verbal aggressions. At a certain point, during the debate, Tobagi, referring to the long series of terrorist assaults, said: "Who knows whose turn is going to be the next time". Ten hours later Tobagi died because of the shots of his murders. He left his wife, Maristella, and his two sons, Luca and Benedetta.

=== The murder ===
Tobagi was killed in Milan in Salaino street, at 11 o'clock, on 28 May 1980, with five shots fired by a terrorist commando of the left wing Brigade XXVIII March (Marco Barbone, Paolo Morandini, Mario Marano, Francesco Giordano, Daniele Laus and Manfredi De Stefano), the majority of which were sons of Milan bourgeoisie's families. Two members of the commando in particular belonged to the journalism field: they are Marco Barbone, son of the well known editorial manager of the publishing company Sansoni (property of the RCS MediaGroup) Donato Barbone, and Paolo Morandini, son of the film critic of the newspaper Il Giorno Morando Morandini.

It was Mario Marano and Marco Barbone who shot. In particular Marco Barbone was supposed to have given him the final shot: when Tobagi was already lying on the ground, the terrorist got closer to him and shot a bullet behind his left ear. In reality, according to the autopsy's results, the deadly shot was the second one, that by hitting his heart caused the journalist's death.

== The trial ==
Few months after the murder, the investigations of Carabinieri and judiciary led to the identification of the murders, and in particular to the identity of the leader of the new born Brigade XXVIII March, Marco Barbone himself who, right after his arrest, on 25 September 1980, decided to collaborate with the police and thanks to his reveals the whole Brigade XXVIII March was knocked down and more than a hundred people suspected of being left wing terrorists with whom Barbone had been in touch during his terrorist militancy were jailed.

The 102 inquests of the maxi-process to the left subversive area, began on 1 March 1983 and ended on 28 November that year. The sentence brought up many controversies because the judge Cusumano, interpreting the law about the repentants in a different way compared to the court of the city of Rome (where in any case were sentenced penalties of over 20 years of jail to repentant terrorists), granted to Marco Barbone, Mario Ferrandi, Umberto Mazzola, Paolo Morandini, Pio Pugliese and Rocco Ricciardi "the benefit of temporary freedom ordering their immediate release if not imprisoned for another cause", whereas the other members of the XXVIII March, De Stefano, Giordano and Laus, were sentenced to thirty years of imprisonment.

The investigations didn't clear out the role occupied by Marco Barbone's girlfriend Caterina Rosenzweig. In 1978, two years before the murder, Caterina Rosenzweig, had stalked for a long time Tobagi, who was also his teacher of modern history at the University of Milan. Even though in September 1980 she was arrested with the others, Caterina was then released because of insufficiency of clues, nonetheless during the process it was ensured that the group of terrorists used to meet at her house in Solferino street, not far away from the offices where Tobagi worked. After the trial she moved to Brazil, a country in which she had already lived because it was the headquarters of his father's business.

The choice taken by the judiciary of building up a trial with more than 150 defendants regarding not only Tobagi's murder but the entire left's subversion, was heavily criticized. This according to Ugo Finetti, provincial secretary of PSI, made the debate appear as "a tral that should be staged so that it is spoken only a tiny bit and in a horrible way about the victim". In fact was hosed as a privileged referent Marco Barbone, who, by regretting right after the murder, started to give a bunch of information about the backgrounds of the "armed fight". This choice appears strange if it is taken into consideration that the general Carlo Alberto Dalla Chiesa in an interview for Panorama released on 22 September 1980 (three days before the arrest of the terrorist), refers to the murder of Tobagi and to the Brigade XXVIII March and talks about the fact of [...] having used the same technique adopted in Turin in '74–75 for the capture of Renato Curcio: extreme secrecy, cultural consciousness of the adversary, infiltration". That is to say, the law enforcement and the judiciary could already have a series of information regarding the terrorist group and the crime. Nevertheless, during the debating they based mainly on Barbone's declarations, who wasn't arrested as a suspect for the murder but with the following charges: membership of the Formazioni comuniste combattenti and Guerriglia rossa, and the participation to the robbery at the Municipal police of Colletta street. In his interview the general himself stated that there are supporters of the Brigade XXVIII March among the journalists. Another weirdness is the unusual uniformity between the points of view of the prosecutor, Barbone's defense and the opposition, always unusual, between accusation and civil party, which saw being refused any kind of instance aimed at clearing out the dynamics of the crime and the circumstances that led to Barbone's regret.

In the document of the claim of the murder the terrorists seem to know the phenomena linked to the world of press or to particulars about Tobagi's professional life; about the journalist they wrote "preso il volo dal Comitato di redazione del Corriere dal 1974, si è subito posto come dirigente capace di ricomporre le grosse contraddizioni politiche esistenti fra le varie correnti", but Gianluigi Da Rold asks: «Come fanno a sapere che Walter Tobagi fece parte del comitato di redazione del Corriere (termine usato solo all'interno di via Solferino) quale rappresentante sindacale del «Corriere d'informazione» anche se per poco tempo [due mesi, ndr], nel 1974?". The committee of Corriere's wording does not have to be confused with the counterpart of Corriere della Sera; there they used to get reunited the representatives of all the newspapers and magazines bounded to the Milans masthead during those years. So in the text is mentioned a very particular fact, but Barbone, during the debate, stated that he got confused: resuming an Ikon's article, they would have written the wrong date about when Tobagi truly became a member of the committee of wording of the newspaper. But, as it was said, the committee of wording of Corriere della Sera is a different from that of the Corriere and it seems really strange that, where the text's author (or the authors, according to Barbone's version) appears to be aware of the difference, in his declaration during the process he shows not to really know that, stating he simply got confused about the date when Tobagi became a member of the committee of "Corriere della Sera"

Another inconsistency in the statements of Barbone is the one regarding his stalking of the journalist the night of 27 May, the day before the murder. In May 1980, the victim often left the city of Milan in order to follow the electoral campaign for the administrative elections, and returned only on Sunday. On the 27, a Wednesday, he was exceptionally at the Milan's "Circolo della Stampa" (where he was subject, as it was referred by some witnesses, of verbal attacks). The terrorist, afterwards, stated he had hung around the headquarter of the association «per rintracciare eventualmente quella del Tobagi e avere conferma che ci fosse, ma senza averla vista, me ne andai subito. La mattina successiva, quindi, agimmo». Se la presenza dell'auto presso il circolo era un fatto secondario rispetto alla messa in pratica del disegno criminoso, allora perché Barbone decise di pedinare Tobagi e soprattutto, come seppe della sua presenza a Milano?

=== Sentences and penalties for the murders ===
At the 1983 trial the members of Brigade XXVIII March's commando were condemned:

- Marco Barbone, the leader of the terrorist group, who shot the deadly bullet, was condemned in 1983 only to eight years and nine months, mainly because he became immediately associate of justice; and he also immediately obtained a provisional release after three years of jail (he left after the sentence)
- Paolo Morandini (Morando's son), immediately repented, and had the same sentence of Barbone.
- Mario Marano (Milan, 1953-2020), who shot the first bullet, confessed and was condemned to 20 years and 4 months, reduced thanks to his collaboration; to 12 years on appeal (then 10 with a general pardon). He was condemned also to 11 years in the Unita Comuniste Combattenti and 3 years and a half in the middle of the process of Prima Linea, for a total of about 24 years. He served his penalty at house arrest from 1986. He was released officially during the 90s.
- Manfredi De Stefano (Salerno, 23 May 1957), condemned to 28 years and eight months; he died in jail in 1984, because of an aneurysm.
- Daniele Laus, the driver of the command, confessed but then retracted and assaulted with a weevil the judge. Condemned to 27 years and eight months, he then was able to reduce his penalty to 16 years. From December 1985 he was released under provisional release.
- Francesco Giordano, who was charged of covering of the terrorist group, did not want either to admit or to collaborate, even though he condemned his terrorist experience and his membership to the group. He was condemned to 30 years and eight months, on appeal they became 21. It was the only one who served the whole sentence: he was released in 2004: He was also condemned to 13 years in the trial to the Unita Comuniste Combattenti. Giordano declared to have been tortured by the Police in 1980 after his arrest.

== Legacy ==
- Tobagi had a diary, but his secrecy typical of his family, subtracted his character from the intrusiveness of the mass media. As Gaspare Barbiellini Amidei stated, "it would be an incredible civilian lesson, having the opportunity of reading it at school. Many kids say they would like to be journalists as grown up. Let them become journalists exactly as Walter Tobagi was".
- Streets have been named after Walter Tobagi in Rome, Milan, Lodi, Peschiera Borromeo (MI), Sordio (LO), Arese (MI), Tribiano (MI), Limito (MI), Magenta (MI), Travedona Monate (VA), Prato (PO), Spoleto (PG), Pisa, San Donaci (BR), Legnaro (PD), Limena (PD), Cosenza, Modena, Sassuolo (MO), Manerbio (BS), Ornago (MB), Bergamo, Capolona (AR), Curno, Almenno San Bartolomeo (BG), Calcinate (BG), Montespertoli (FI), Latina, Montale (PT), Taviano (LE), Tromello (PV), L'Aquila, Siderno (RC), Savona, Vigolzone (PC), Monreale (PA), the lungomare in Borghetto Santo Spirito (SV), Abbiategrasso (Mi). In Limbiate (MI), Cadoneghe (PD) and San Biagio di Callalta (TV) a square was named after Walter Tobagi; in Cusano Milanino the Sala Consiliare Municipale was named after the journalist.
- The kindergarten of Cerro Maggiore (MI), the place where Tobagi was buried, was named after him.
- On 23 January 2008, in a special episode of Ballarò, a Rai 3 TV program, the journalist Giovanni Floris interviewed Benedetta, Walter's daughter who was three years old when her father was killed. Benedetta Tobagi, who is nowadays collaborating with La Repubblica, summarised her father's life in the book " Come mi batte forte il tuo cuore".

== Works ==
Walter Tobagi wrote seven books:

- History of the student movement and of the marxisti-leninisti in Italia (1970, Sugar editor).It was Tobagi's first book, which was published when he was only twenty three years old with which he enriched other inquiries published on other newspapers.
- Gli anni del manganello, Fratelli Fabbri Editor, 1973. It is an inquiry-book, in which Tobagi tells Italy of 1922.1926: the years when fascism impose the laws of violence as the State laws.
- La fondazione della politica salariale della CGIL, Annali of Giangiacomo Feltrinelli's Foundation, 1974.
- I cattolici e l'unità sindacale, Esi, 1976. It is a book mainly about texts and speeches of Achille Grandi (1944–1946). A more wide kind of biography of the catholic trade unionist. together with a serie of essays of other authors, was written by Tobagi in a new book, published by Il Mulino (Achille Grandi, sindacalismo cattolico e democrazia sindacale)
- .The impossible revolution, Il Saggiatore, 1978.
- Il sindacato riformista, Sugarco, 1979. Collection of some essays
- (postumo) Che cosa contano i sindacati, Rizzoli, 1980. Il libro metteva a nudo gli errori, le contraddizioni, i limiti del sindacato degli anni settanta.

== Movies about Walter Tobagi ==
- Una fredda mattina di maggio (1990), directed by Vittorio Sindoni: a movie freely inspired to the events that led up to the murder of the journalist, with changed names because of narrative requirements; the character inspired by Tobagi is interpreted by Sergio Castellitto

== TV programs about Walter Tobagi ==
The character of Walter Tobagi along with his life and murder has been the subject of different TV programs such as:

- Special Walter Tobagi, a program created and directed by Claudio Martinelli, live on September 15, 2004 at 22.45 on Canale 5, with a Marco Barbone's interview
- Special Ballarò: special episode broadcast on January 23, 2008 at 21:05 on Raitre, dedicated to three well-known victims of left wing terrorism (Luigi Calabresi, Walter Tobagi and Emilio Alessandrini) with their children as special guests (Mario Calabresi, Benedetta Tobagi and Marco Alessandrini);
- La storia siamo noi, episode of Giovanni Minoli's program which tells Tobagi's biography;
- Walter Tobagi. Giornalista, episode of the special La 7 program, created and directed by Antonello Piroso. The episode was broadcast on La 7 on September 4, 2009;
- InTempoReale, special episode of June 1, 2010, entirely dedicated to Walter Tobagi, of the program in syndication (Canale 10 and Telegenova and Telereporter Milano) curated and directed by Maurizio Decollanz; With three guests: the journalist Renzo Magosso, Roberto Della Rocca, president, at the time, of the Associazione italiana vittime del terrorismo, and the magistrate Pier Luigi Vigna.
