= Dresano =

- Comune
- Comune di Dresano
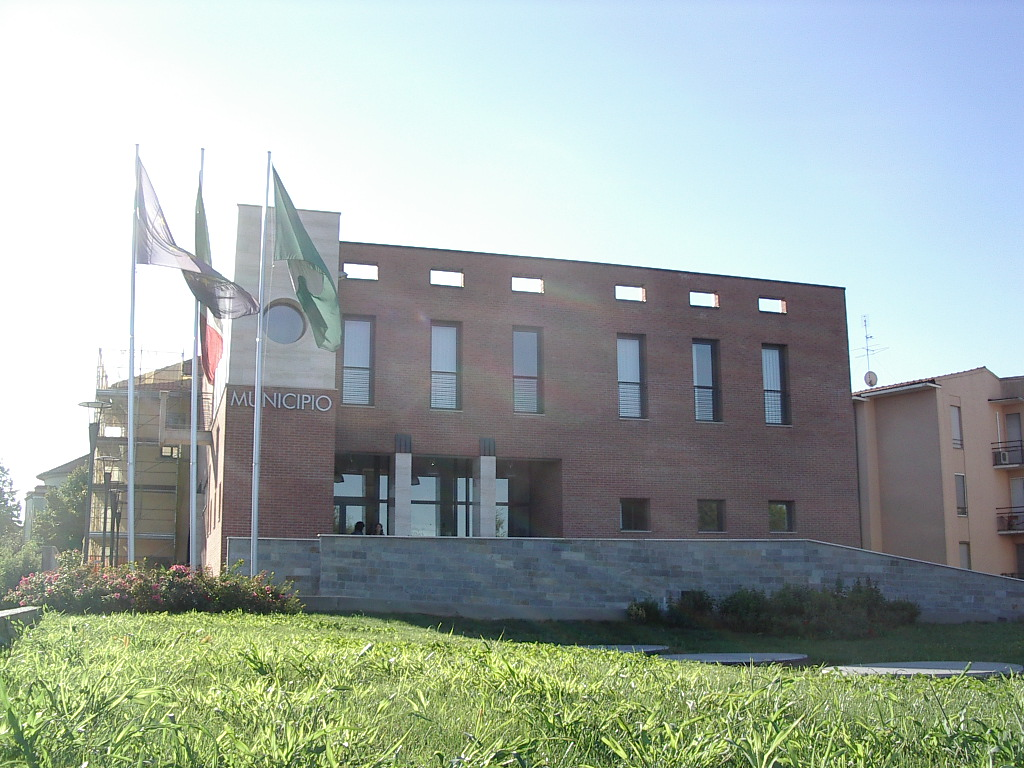
- Town hall.

- Location within Italy Location within Lombardy
- Coordinates: 45°22′N 9°22′E
- Country: Italy
- Region: Lombardy
- Metropolitan city: Milan (MI)

Government
  - Mayor: Vito Penta

Area
  - Total: 3.48 km^{2} (1.34 sq mi)
- Elevation: 91 m (299 ft)

Population (30 November 2017)
  - Total: 3,041
  - Density: 874/km^{2} (2,260/sq mi)
- Demonym: Dresanesi
- Time zone: UTC+1 (CET)
  - Summer (DST): UTC+2 (CEST)
- Postal code: 20077
- Dialing code: 02
- Website: Official website

Dresano (Lombard: Dresan [dreˈzãː]) is a comune (municipality) in the Metropolitan City of Milan in the Italian region of Lombardy, located about 20 kilometres (12 mi) southeast of Milan.

Dresano borders the following municipalities: Mediglia, Tribiano, Mulazzano, Colturano, Vizzolo Predabissi and Casalmaiocco.

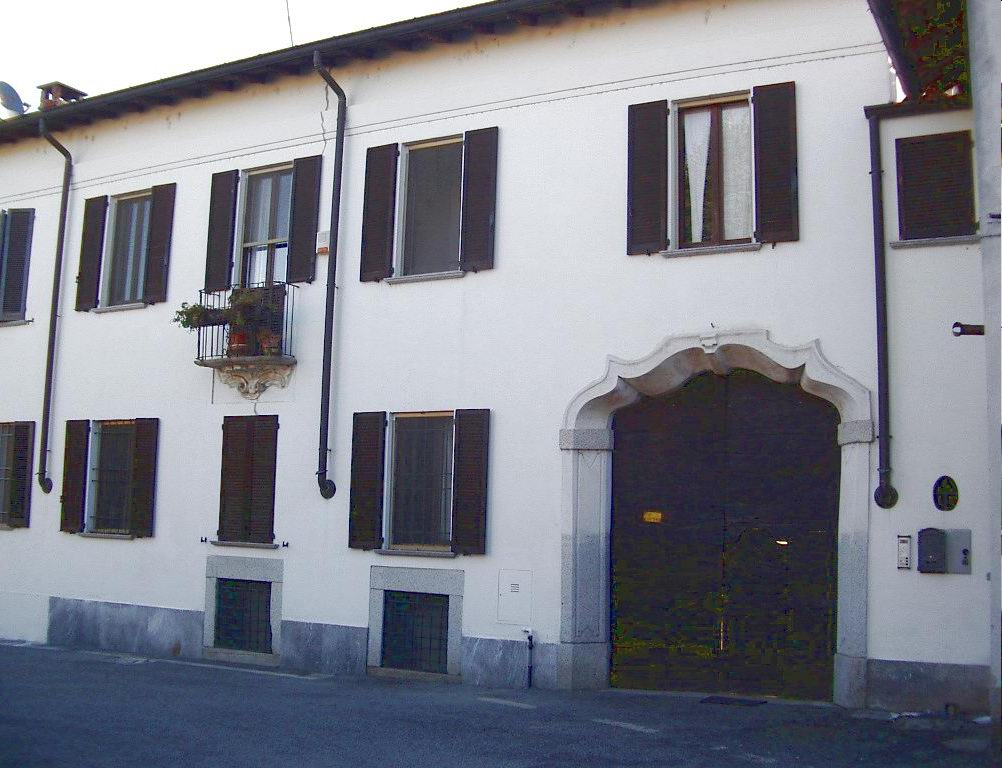
old Saint Benedict monk order convent, in Dresano town centre

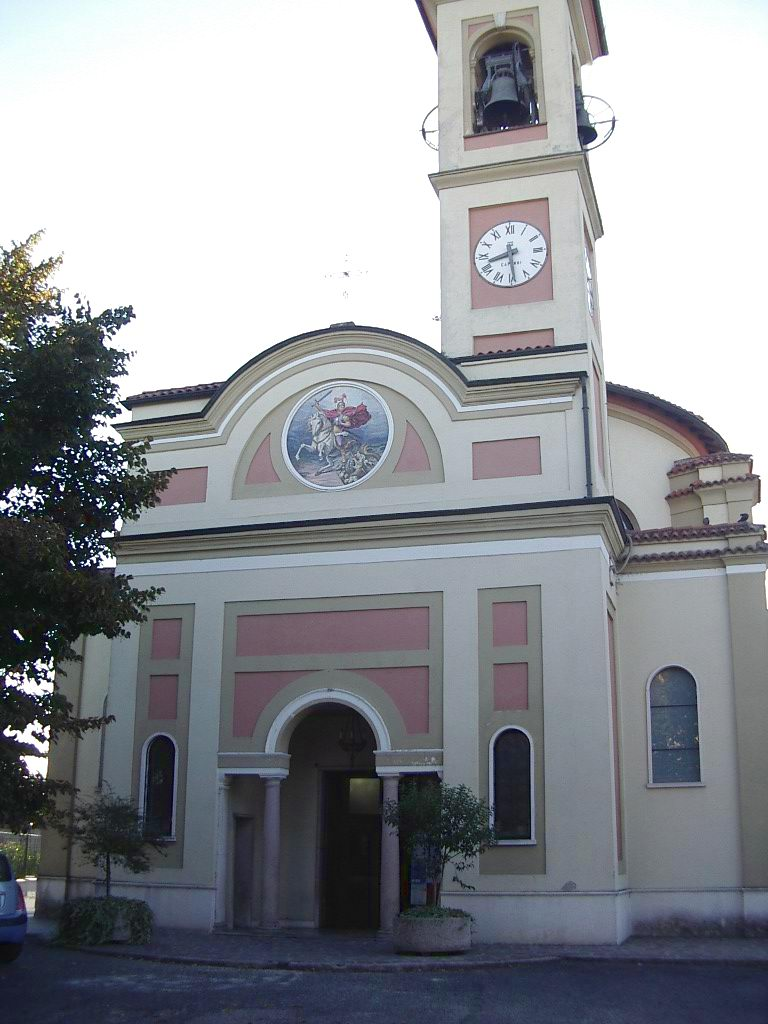
Chiesa di San Giorgio martire, in Dresano town centre

== Etymology ==
The name Dresano is due to the presence, in these swampy areas, of three inlets, three "sinuses", from which the name evolved over the centuries: Tresseno, then Tressano and Tresano, and finally Dresano. The three inlets appear in the coat of arms too, surmounted by three poplar trees, the poplar being one of the most typical local trees.

== History ==
The old village hosts the remains of one of its most ancient buildings: on the East side of Piazza Manzoni the wall of an establishment with a massive wooden double door is found, which was part of the convent of the benedictines, who performed the hard task of draining and cultivating the swampy territories around. In this area malaria (swamp fever) took its toll.

== Climate ==
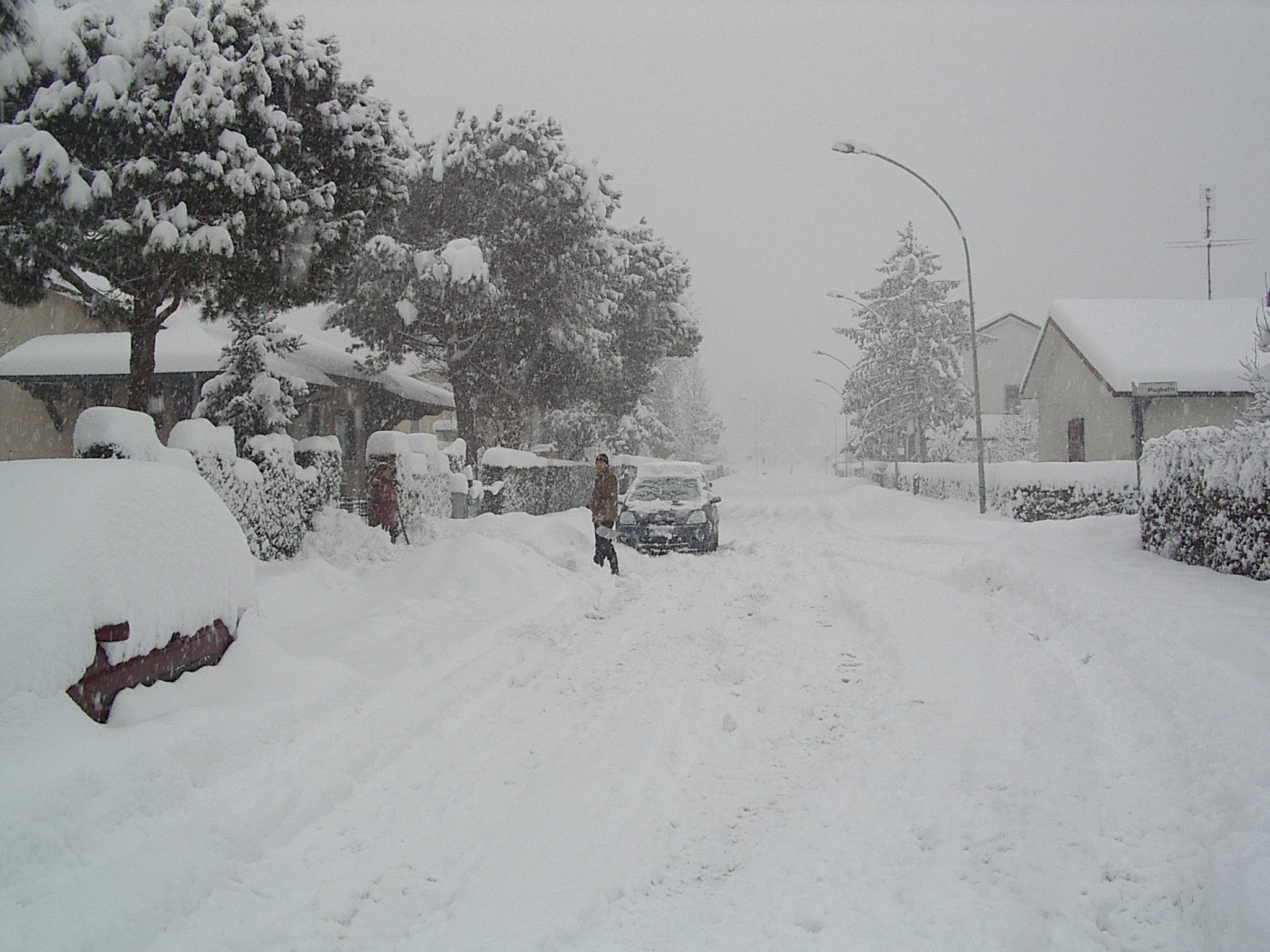
Via delle camelie, Villaggio ambrosiano, covered by snow in January 2006

The climate in Dresano is characterised by sultry summers, and rainy, cold winters. Occasionally, heavy snowfall occurs; in 1995 a particularly heavy snowfall blocked the roads, paralysing traffic and forcing schools to close for several days.

The end of August-early September is characterised by violent thunderstorms and heavy sleet which signal the end of summer.

== Topography ==
The village is divided into four smaller areas: the old village (Dresano vecchio), Madonnina (built in the 1960s), Villaggio ambrosiano (erected in the 1970s) and Villaggio Helios (begun in the 1990s).

The old village shows one of the oldest farms in the area, Cascina Belpensiero, which displays a centuries-old tree in the middle of the farmyard. This former dairy farm is already mentioned in written historical sources dating back to 1500, and it is still surrounded by fields, 1 kilometre (0.62 mi) from the village.

Every year, in May, the traditional "Quater Pass per un Vitel" (= "four steps for a calf" in the local dialect), an amatorial footrace, is organised by the local sports group Gruppo Sportivo Marciatori San Giorgio (San Giorgio being the local patron saint). The prize for such race used to be a live calf (hence the name), nowadays it is an award. There are three different options for the race: 6 kilometres (3.7 mi), 12 kilometres (7.5 mi), and 21 kilometres (13 mi).

== Government ==
The following is a list of the local mayors from 1945 onward

Term Dates	Name
1945-1960	Luigi Giuseppe Preda
1960-1975	Mario Ferrario
1975-1980	Giovanni Uselli
1980-1988	Giulio Testa
1988-1990	Aldo Figini
1991-1991	Gianna Gelo
1991-1992	Angelo Zanvettor
1992-2002	Gianna Gelo
2002-2012	Mario Valesi
2012-2021	Vito Penta
2021-present	Nicola Infante

== Sport ==
Sport associations in Dresano include:

- Gruppo sportivo marciatori San Giorgio (walkers' group)
- Auser (providing assistance to the elderly and the disabled)
- Dresano Calcio (soccer team)
- Dresano Basket (basketball team)

== Events ==
- Carnevale dresanese (carnival): February
- Dresano fiorita (flower show): 2nd Sunday of April
- "Quater pass per un vitel": 1st Sunday of June (footrace)
- Marcia Serale del Belpensiero (footrace): June (non-competitive footrace by night)
- Festa dell'uva (grapevine fair): 2nd Sunday of September

The gym and the municipal library, managed by volunteers, are located in the school complex of the Villaggio ambrosiano.

== Ecology ==
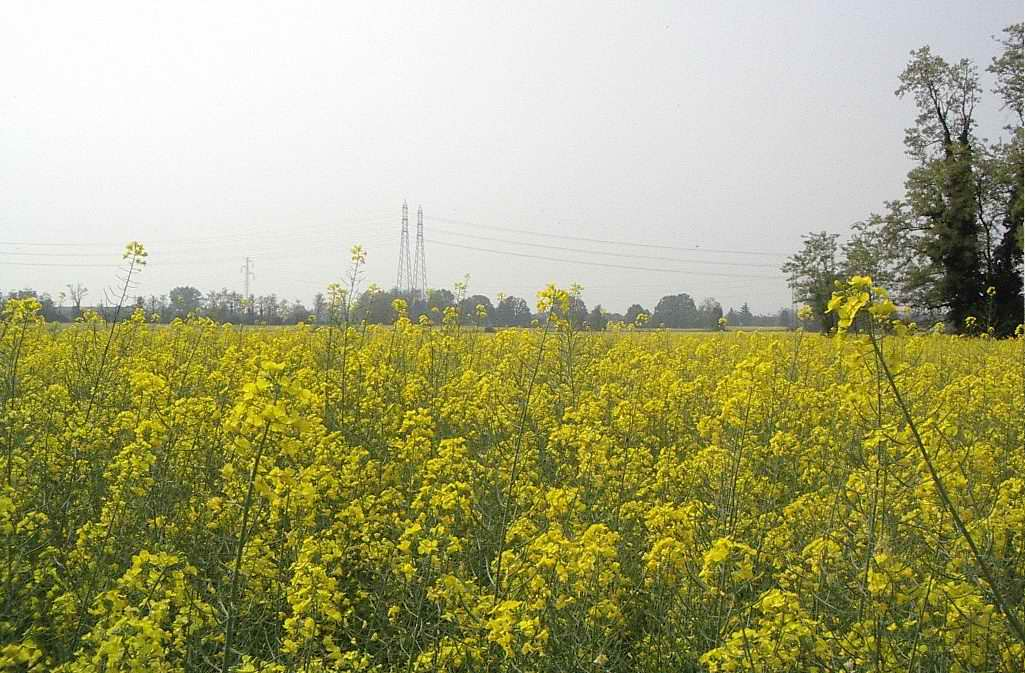
Oilseed rape cultivation, close to the water purifier

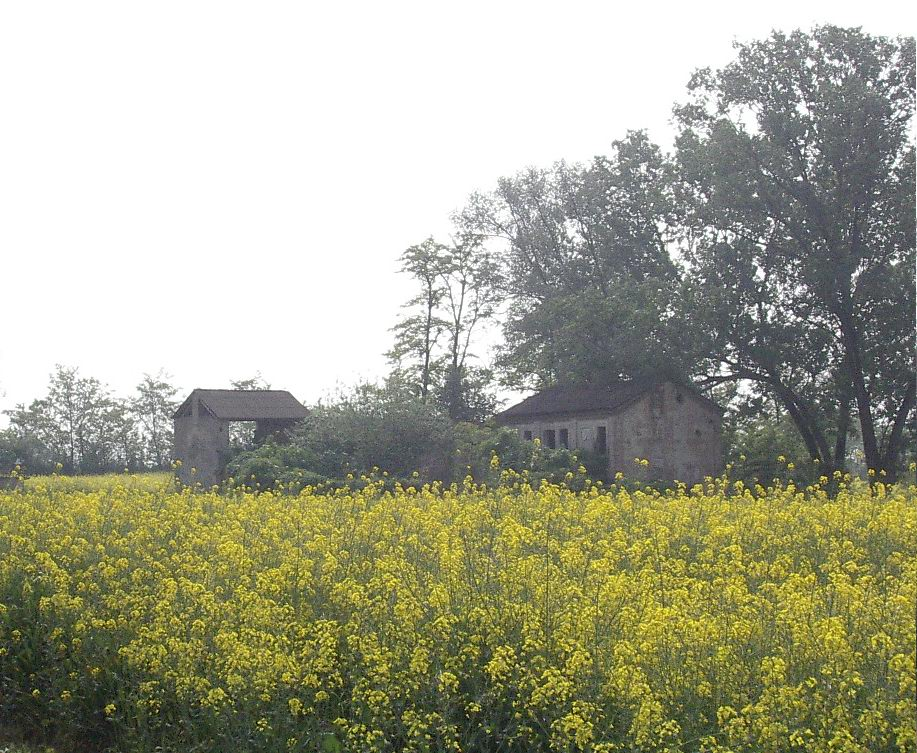
An old derelict mill, close to the Addetta floodway

Dresano owns a water purification plant. The water purifier can be found along the Addetta floodway, close to Balbiano.

Fields in Dresano territory are intensely farmed. The most popular cultivations are:

- wheat
- barley
- fodder maize
- oilseed rape

== Biodiversity ==
Dresano, a farmland tradition town, has shown in the last few years an increased level of biodiversity, thanks to various animal and plant species, that live mainly along waterways.

=== Wildlife ===
Local noticeable wild animal species, especially on the Addetta floodway banks, include:

- Grey heron (Ardea cinerea)
- Pheasant
- Common chaffinch (Fringilla coelebs)
- Moorhen
- Little egret (Egretta garzetta)
- Mallard (Anas platyrhynchos)
- Kingfisher
- Common blackbird (Turdus merula)
- Green woodpecker (Picus viridis)
- Song thrush (Turdus philomelos)
- Common nightingale (Luscinia megarhynchos)
- European rabbit
- European hare
- Coypu (nutria)
- Bat
- European hedgehog
- Fox
- Bumble bee
- Dragonfly
- Glow-worm
- Mediterranean barbel
- Crucian carp
- European chub
- Pumpkinseed (common sunfish)
- Walking catfish
- European perch
- Common rudd
- Tench
- Western green lizard
- Frog
- Toad
- Swollen river mussel
- a black and red huge crayfish, not yet identified

=== Flora ===
- Humulus lupulus, also called wild asparagus, but it is actually a species of the hop plant. It can be added to soups, omelettes, salads, rice, or boiled and dressed with olive oil and lemon.
- Evergreen hawthorn
- Roman chamomile
- Horsetail
- Fig (Ficus)
- Black mulberry
- Scarlet rose mallow
- White horse-chestnut tree
- Peppermint (Brandy mint)
- Walnut
- Hazel
- Onice, women's clogs were once made with this wood, since it doesn't warm the feet too much.
- Plane tree
- White poplar
- Black poplar
- Aspen
- Wild plum tree
- Black locust (False acacia)
- Blackberry bush (Blackberry bramble)
- Elder
- Grapevine
