= Colturano =

Colturano Colturan (Lombard)
- Comune
- Comune di Colturano
- Location within Italy Location within Lombardy
- Coordinates: 45°23′N 9°20′E
- Country: Italy
- Region: Lombardy
- Metropolitan city: Milan (MI)
- Frazioni: Balbiano

Government
  - Mayor: Giulio Enrico Maria Guala

Area
  - Total: 4.16 km^{2} (1.61 sq mi)
- Elevation: 90 m (300 ft)

Population (30 November 2017)
  - Total: 2,102
  - Density: 505/km^{2} (1,310/sq mi)
- Demonym: Colturanei
- Time zone: UTC+1 (CET)
  - Summer (DST): UTC+2 (CEST)
- Postal code: 20060
- Dialing code: 02
- Website: Official website

Colturano (Milanese: Colturan [kultyˈrãː]) is a comune (municipality) in the Metropolitan City of Milan in the Italian region Lombardy, located approximately 15 kilometres (9 mi) southeast of Milan.

Colturano borders the following municipalities: Mediglia, Tribiano, San Giuliano Milanese, Dresano, Vizzolo Predabissi, Melegnano.

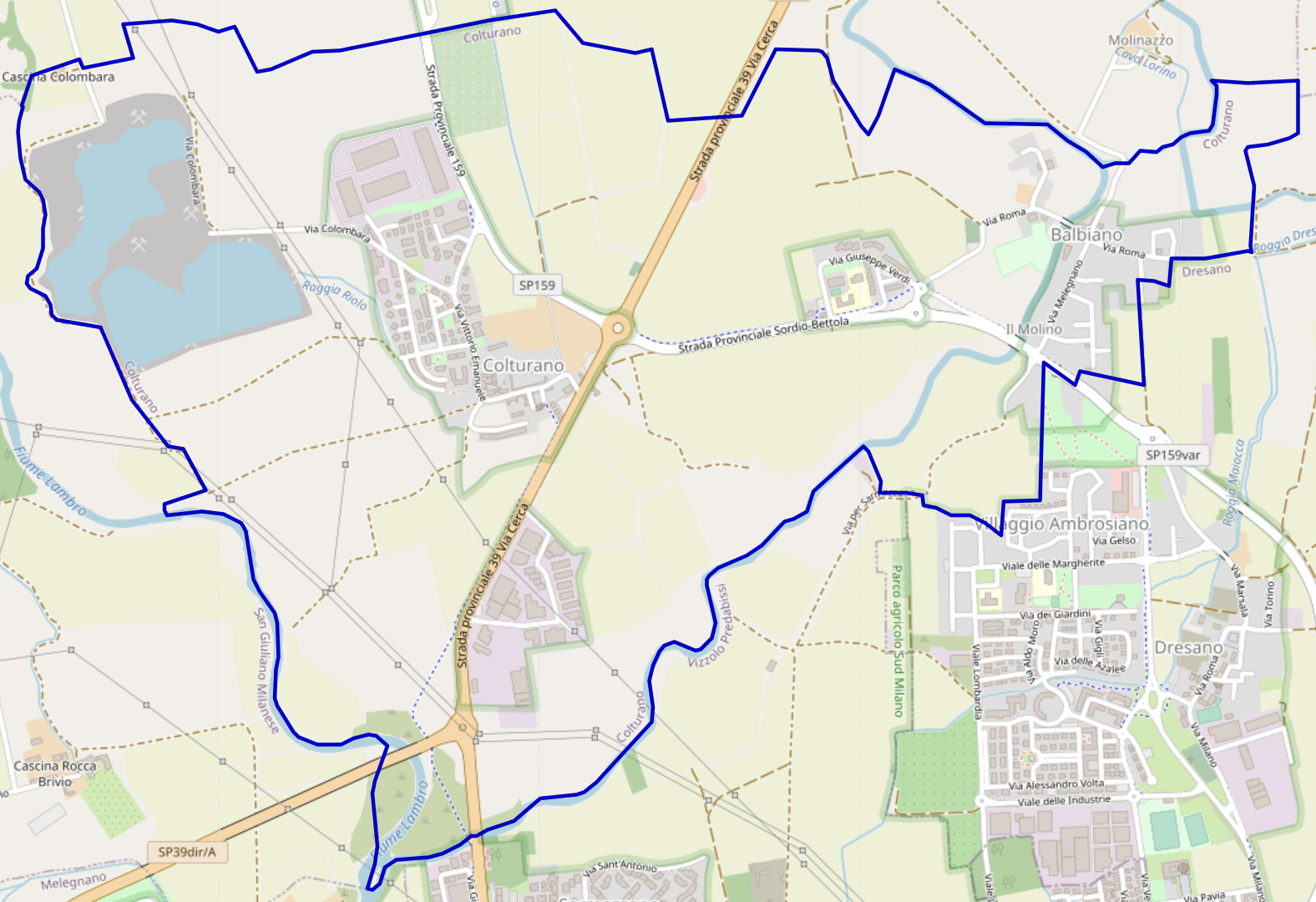
Map of Colturano; outline in blue
