= TT Toys Toys =

Manufacturer

TT Toys Toys SRL are an Italian manufacturer of children’s pedal and electric ride on cars. They have a factory near Milan and specialise in the manufacture of licensed replica cars for children.

== History ==
Alberto Burratti, Luigi Vezzoli, Carlo Boselli and Pietro Pandini founded Toys Toys in 1978 in Tribiano, Province of Milan (Lombardy). The founders came from a specialist vacuum-forming factory and wanted to apply this knowledge to the toy world. The company built up a number of partnerships with major car-manufacturers and with entertainment companies (such as Walt Disney).

In 1997 Toys Toys joined the Berchet Group.

The partnership with Berchet allowed Toys Toys to increase its product range and encourage a direct presence in Italy. However Berchet began to suffer from financial difficulty and so in 2005 was acquired by rival company Smoby. Smoby used its vast network of global distributors to catapult Toys Toys products across the world. However Smoby themselves then fell into financial troubles and despite an attempt by MGA to save the company, they eventually fell into the French equivalent of bankruptcy and their CEO was arrested. Therefore, in 2007 the Toys Toys bosses decided to acquire the company via a management buy-out, and continued to remain independent even after Simba-Dickie revived Smoby.

Toys Toys enjoyed a few years of growth as it built up its own network of distributors around the world, however was badly hit by the global recession that began at the end of 2007. Toys Toys did survive the crisis, but in 2010 agreed to an acquisition by the Italian company WICE Group, which has given the company extra security.

== Products ==
Toys Toys primarily focuses on the manufacture of licensed ride-on cars for children. The company works with the relevant manufacturer’s designers to recreate the adult car in child size.

Despite the focus on licensed cars, Toys Toys has experimented with non-branded ride-ons as well. They manufactured a petrol-powered Freester that later became a 24v. The latest 2010 catalogue includes a range of ‘baby’ pedal cars which are smaller and cheaper than their licensed products.

== Licenses ==
Toys Toys holds licenses for a variety of sports car brands as well as licenses for more mainstream cars.

Toys Toys have always been very picky about what licenses they accept, agreeing to only manufacture popular and prestigious cars. In 2009 the managers turned down offers to manufacturer licensed cars for Aston Martin and Bentley.

License	Models available in 2010 Catalogue	Models discontinued from 2009
Ferrari	F1, California, Enzo, 458 Italia	F430 Scuderia, 250 GTO 550
Lamborghini	Gallardo	-
Mercedes	300 SL, 500 SL	SLK
BMW	335i Cabrio, M6, 328	Z4 Z3 645ci
Porsche	Cayenne, 356	Boxster 'S'
Renault	Twingo	Megane Trophy Scenic
Volkswagen	Beetle	-
Fiat	Classic 500, Nuova 500	-
Abarth	500	-
Alfa Romeo	8C	Brera GTV
Jaguar	XK	xj12 daimler
Audi	R8 Spyder	TT
Citroen	Charleston 2CV	C3 Pluriel DS 19 Traction Avant
Mini	Cooper 'S'	-
Smart	Fortwo	-

== Distributing Countries ==
- Italy – MacDue
- France – Tbd
- Germany – R.Brehm GMBH
- Spain – Tbd
- Portugal – Tbd
- United Kingdom – Exclusive Toys
- Ukraine - Alimpex Group
- Switzerland – Tbd
