= Casalmaiocco =

Comune in Lombardia, Italia

Casalmaiocco Casalmaiòcch (Lombard)
- Comune
- Comune di Casalmaiocco
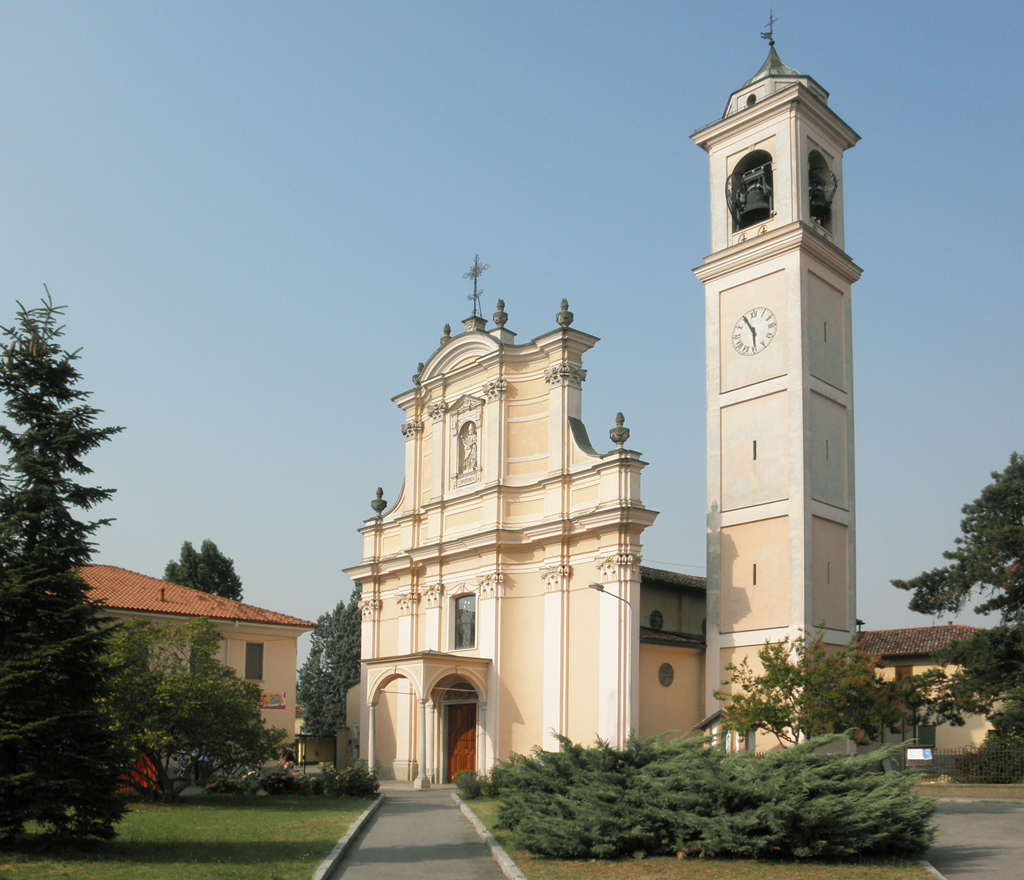

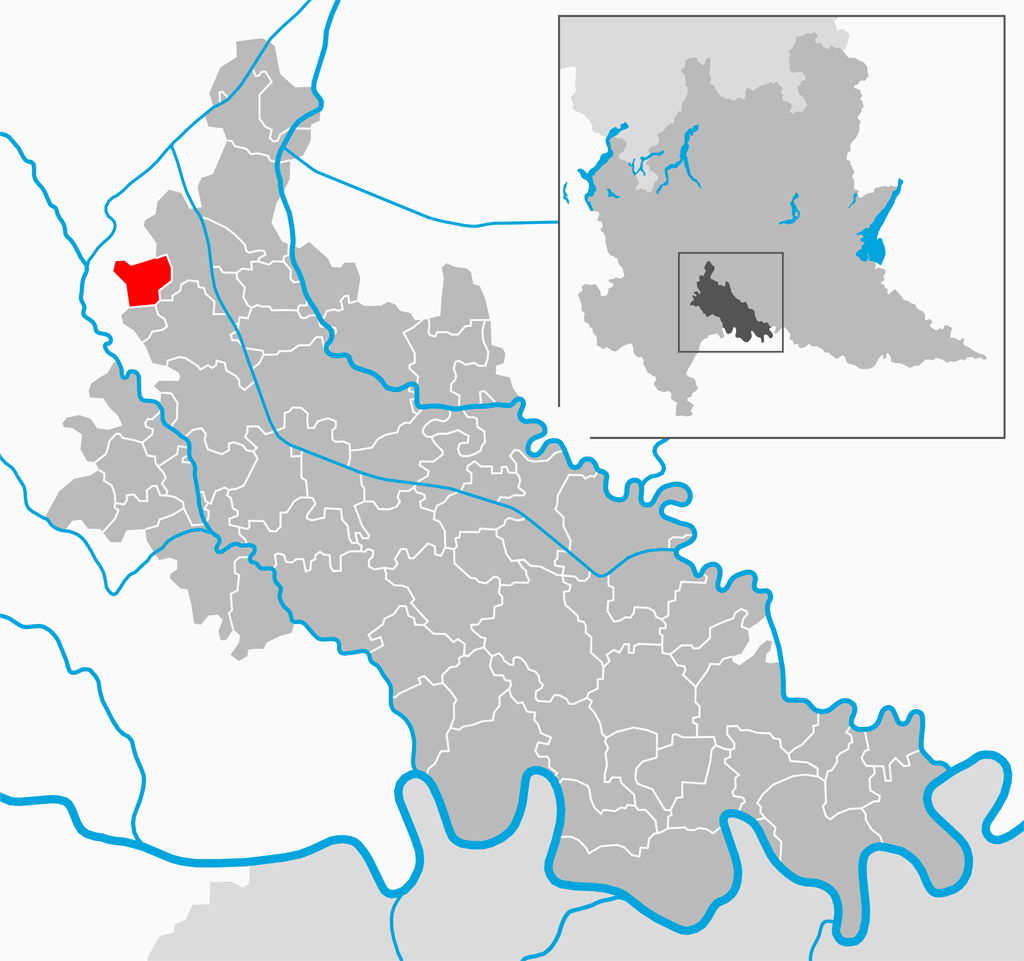

- Location within Italy Location within Lombardy
- Coordinates: 45°21′17″N 9°22′31″E
- Country: Italy
- Region: Lombardy
- Province: Lodi (LO)
- Frazioni: Madonnina

Government
  - Mayor: Marco Vighi

Area
  - Total: 4.7 km^{2} (1.8 sq mi)
- Elevation: 88 m (289 ft)

Population (31 May 2017)
  - Total: 3,182
  - Density: 680/km^{2} (1,800/sq mi)
- Demonym: Casalini
- Time zone: UTC+1 (CET)
  - Summer (DST): UTC+2 (CEST)
- Postal code: 26831
- Dialing code: 02
- Website: Official website

Casalmaiocco (Lodigiano: Casalmaiòcch) is a comune (municipality) in the Province of Lodi in the Italian region Lombardy, located about 25 kilometres (16 mi) southeast of Milan and about 15 kilometres (9 mi) north of Lodi.

Casalmaiocco borders the following municipalities: Mulazzano, Dresano, Vizzolo Predabissi, Tavazzano con Villavesco and Sordio.
