= Lino Cauzzo =

Italian footballer (1924–1998)

Personal information
- Date of birth: 3 February 1924
- Place of birth: Cadoneghe, Kingdom of Italy
- Date of death: 11 August 1998 (aged 74)
- Position: Midfielder

Senior career*
Years	Team	Apps	(Gls)
1945–1946	Cuneo		
1946–1947	Juventus	5	(0)
1947–1952	Venezia	91	(1)
1952–1954	Lecce	55	(0)
1954–1955	Brindisi		
1955–1957	Barletta		
- * Club domestic league appearances and goals

Lino Cauzzo (3 February 1924 – 11 August 1998) was an Italian professional football player.

Cauzzo died on 11 August 1998, at the age of 74.
