= Marco Schiesaro =

Italian politician

Mayor of Cadoneghe
- Incumbent
- Assumed office 11 June 2024

Personal details
- Born: 26 November 1986 (age 39) Padua, Italy
- Party: Lega
- Spouse: Giorgia Faulisi
- Education: University of Padua
- Occupation: Politician entrepreneur

Marco Schiesaro (26 November 1986) is an Italian politician and entrepreneur from Padua, in the Veneto region. He served as a district councilor in Padua from 2009 to 2014. He was elected Mayor of Cadoneghe in 2019 and re-elected in the June 2024 municipal elections.

== Biography ==
Marco Schiesaro was born in Padua, Italy in 1986. Marco Schiesaro who grew up in Cadoneghe. Italy. He graduated from University of Padua. He was married to Giorgia Faulisi.

== Education ==
Marco attended elementary and middle school in Cadoneghe. He enrolled at the Amedeo di Savoia Duca d’Aosta State High School, where he obtained a diploma in Social Sciences in 2004. He also Degree in Political Science and a postgraduate master's degree focused on European integration.

== News ==
In September 2026, Schiesaro attracted national attention over his decision to halt a Moroccan woman's citizenship ceremony because he believed she could not adequately understand or respond in Italian. The case sparked debate about language proficiency, citizenship procedures and discrimination. Matteo Salvini publicly defended the mayor's position.
