= Vizzolo Predabissi =

- Comune
- Comune di Vizzolo Predabissi
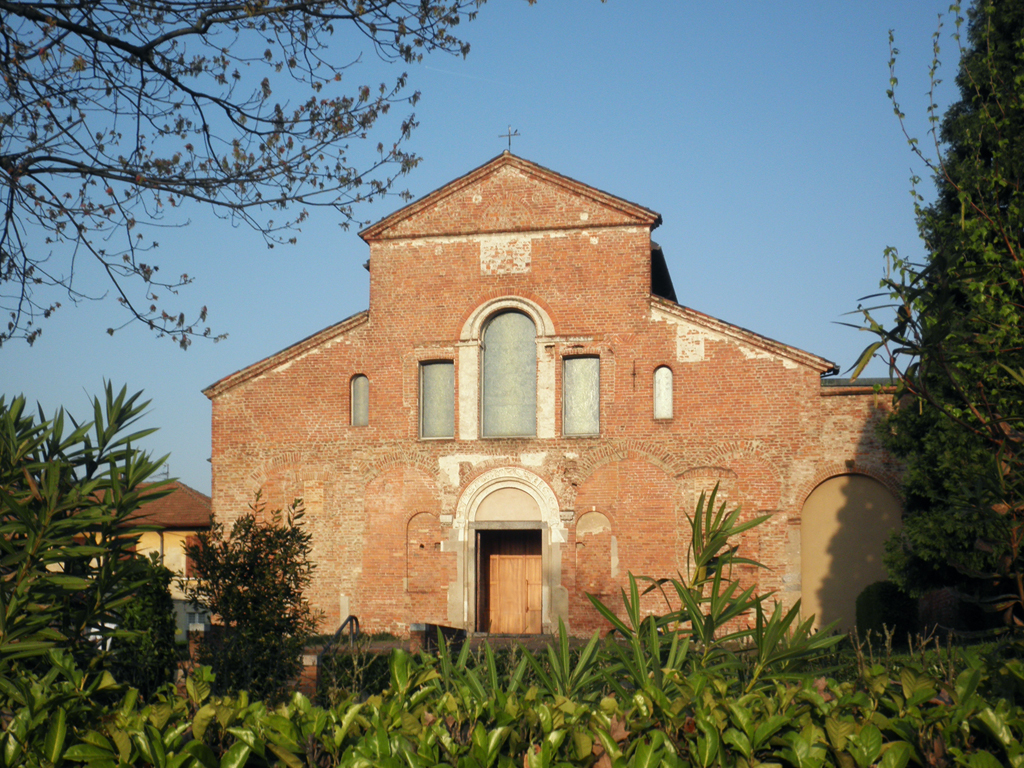
- Church of Santa Maria in Calvenzano.

- Location within Italy Location within Lombardy
- Coordinates: 45°21′N 9°21′E
- Country: Italy
- Region: Lombardy
- Metropolitan city: Milan (MI)

Government
  - Mayor: Luisa Salvatori

Area
  - Total: 5.65 km^{2} (2.18 sq mi)
- Elevation: 90 m (300 ft)

Population (31 December 2018)
  - Total: 4,012
  - Density: 710/km^{2} (1,840/sq mi)
- Demonym: Vizzolesi
- Time zone: UTC+1 (CET)
  - Summer (DST): UTC+2 (CEST)
- Postal code: 20070
- Dialing code: 02
- Website: Official website

Vizzolo Predabissi (Milanese: Vizzoeu) is a comune (municipality) in the Metropolitan City of Milan in the Italian region Lombardy, located about 20 kilometres (12 mi) southeast of Milan.

Vizzolo Predabissi borders the following municipalities: Colturano, Dresano, Casalmaiocco, Melegnano, Cerro al Lambro, Sordio and San Zenone al Lambro.
