= Sordio =

Sordio Sördi (Lombard)
- Comune
- Comune di Sordio
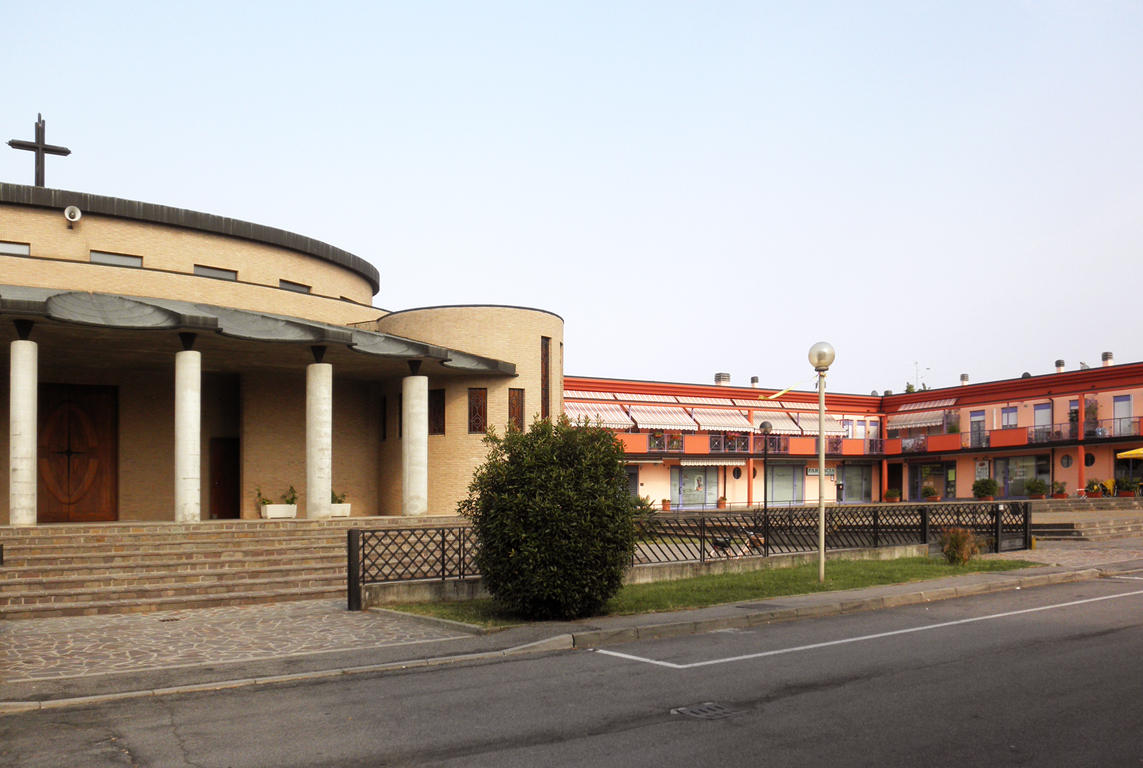

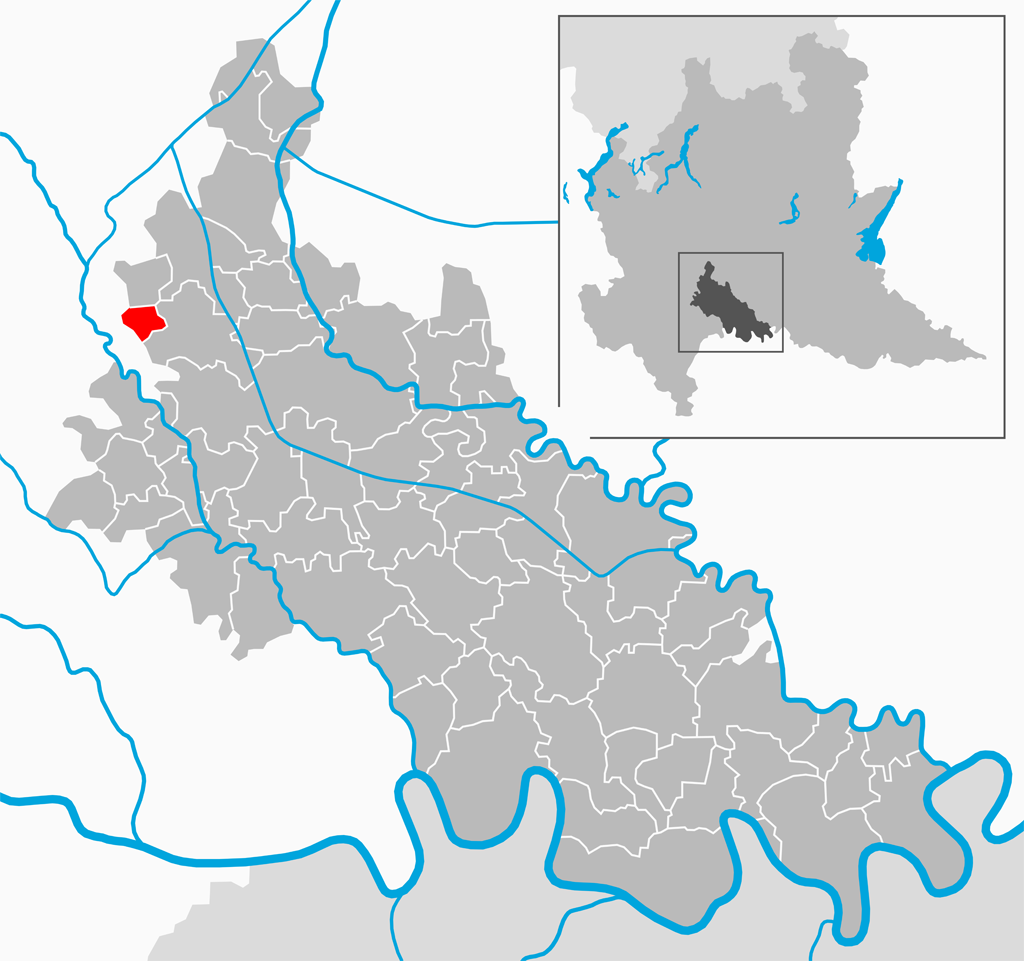

- Location within Italy Location within Lombardy
- Coordinates: 45°20′26″N 9°21′56″E
- Country: Italy
- Region: Lombardy
- Province: Lodi (LO)

Government
  - Mayor: Salvatore Iesce

Area
  - Total: 2.82 km^{2} (1.09 sq mi)

Population (30 November 2012)
  - Total: 3,188
  - Density: 1,130/km^{2} (2,930/sq mi)
- Demonym: Sordiesi
- Time zone: UTC+1 (CET)
  - Summer (DST): UTC+2 (CEST)
- Postal code: 26858
- Dialing code: 02
- Website: Official website

Sordio (Lodigiano: Sördi) is a comune (municipality) in the Province of Lodi in the Italian region Lombardy, located about 20 kilometres (12 mi) southeast of Milan and about 12 kilometres (7 mi) northwest of Lodi.

Sordio borders the following municipalities: Vizzolo Predabissi, Casalmaiocco, Tavazzano con Villavesco and San Zenone al Lambro.
