= Tribiano =

Tribiano Comune di Tribiano
- Comune
- Comune of Tribiano
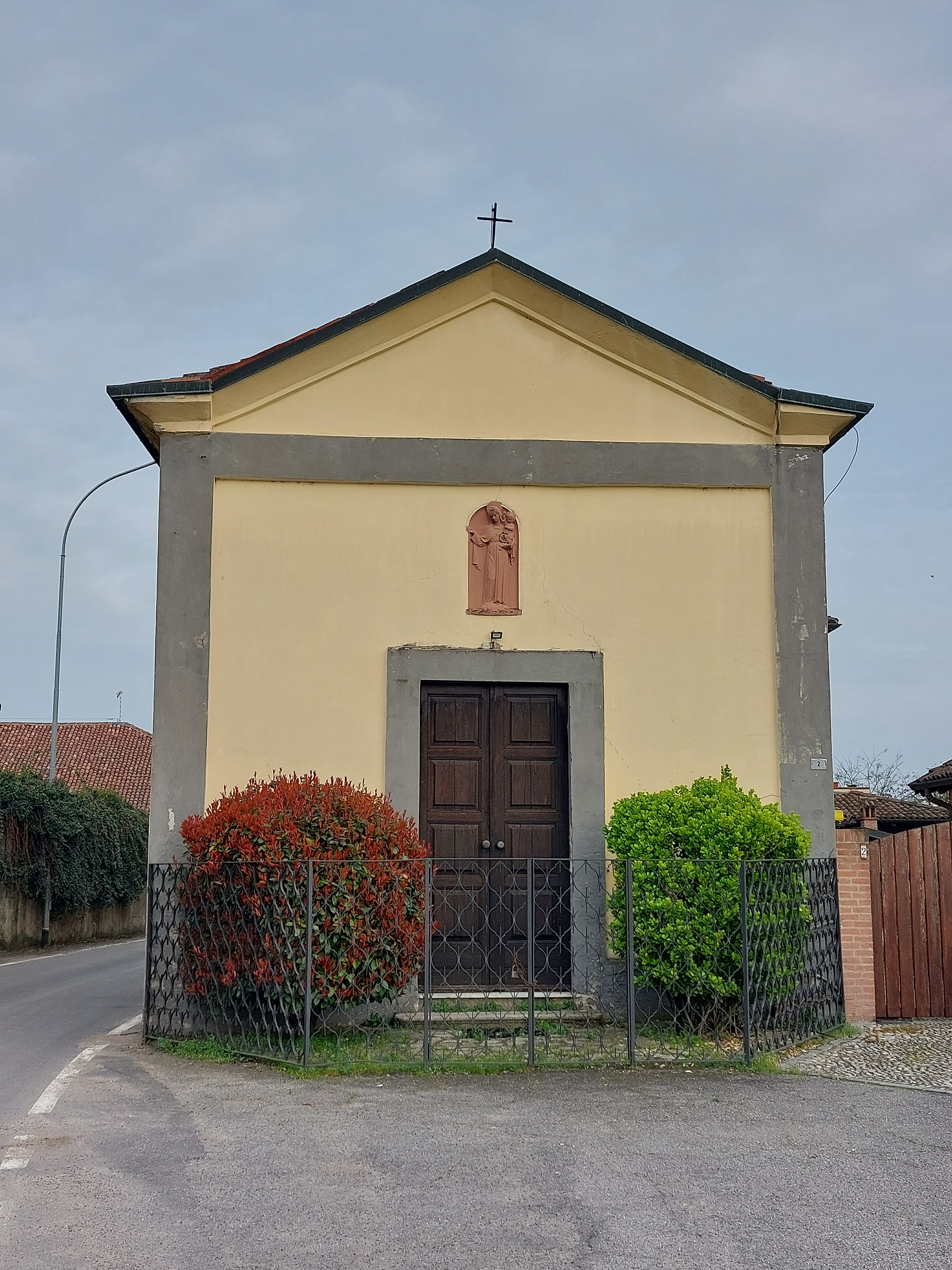
- Church of Santi Gervasio and Protasio

- Location within Italy Location within Lombardy
- Coordinates: 45°25′N 9°23′E
- Country: Italy
- Region: Lombardy
- Metropolitan city: Milan (MI)
- Frazioni: Lanzano, Zoate and San Barbaziano

Government
  - Mayor: Roberto Gabriele (Fratelli d'Italia)

Area
  - Total: 7.0 km^{2} (2.7 sq mi)

Population (2021)
  - Total: 3,623
  - Density: 520/km^{2} (1,300/sq mi)
- Demonym: Tribianesi
- Time zone: UTC+1 (CET)
  - Summer (DST): UTC+2 (CEST)
- Postal code: 20067
- Dialing code: 02
- Patron saint: Saints Vito, Modesto and Crescenzia
- Saint day: 15 June
- Website: https://www.comune.tribiano.mi.it/it-it/home

Tribiano (Lombard: Tribian [triˈbjãː]) is a comune (municipality) in the Province of Milan in the Italian region Lombardy, about 20 kilometres (12 mi) southeast of Milan. As of 31 December 2004 it had a population of 2512 and an area of 7.0 square kilometres (2.7 mi^{2}).

Tribiano borders the following municipalities: Paullo, Mediglia, Mulazzano, Colturano, Dresano.

== Demographic evolution ==
Since 1861 (year of Italian Unification) the population had a big increase, mostly in the 2000s, due an increase of people moving in Tribiano. Since 1861 the population went to 785 people, 864 in 1951, to 1193 in 1991 and 3623 in 2021.

== History ==
The foundation of Tribiano dates back to Roman times. At the time it was a small agricultural village called Trebianus, which was crossed by an important Roman road, the Via Regina, which connected the river port of Cremona (modern Cremona) with Mediolanum (Milan). Later it was part of the Lodi area and its diocese. In the Napoleonic age (1809) Paullo became a hamlet of Tribiano.

After the Second Italian War of Independence, following the enactment of the Rattazzi Decree (1859), the municipality was assigned to the province of Milan. Despite the historical ties with the Lodi area, at the constitution of the province of Lodi (1992) the municipality of Tribiano decided not to be part of it, thus remaining in the province of Milan.

During World War I and the World War II, many male citizens from Tribiano went to fight at the front and in the different military corps. There is a dedicated monument in Papa Giovanni Paolo II (Pope John Paul II) square.

== Symbols ==
=== Coat of arms ===
In blue, it has a bundle of three ears of wheat, each surmounted by a star, with the word "Trebianum" on its head, all in gold.

=== Banner ===
Divided into two colored parts on the left side in yellow and in the opposite side in blue. In the center there is the coat of arms of Tribiano adorned with branches and leaves of various types.

== Physical geography ==
The territory is arranged in such a way as to flank the main traffic routes of the Milanese south-east, and extends over an area of 4,150 km in length and almost 3 km in width.

A historic town with a mainly agricultural economy, around the 1960s, around 70 factories / industries were installed on the territory, which ensure work for thousands of workers from neighboring municipalities.

The landscape is typical of the Po Valley, with fields surrounded by canals, ditches and canals, suitable for irrigation, long avenues rendered ethereal by the rows of poplars, plane trees and willows that line the edges.

Tribiano runs along the Addetta canal, a branch of the Muzza Canal, which divides the town from North-East to South-West.

== Anthropic geography ==
=== Hamlets ===
==== Lanzano ====
Famous for its small church dedicated to Saints Gervasio and Protasio. A feud that was owned by various hands but with the veto to preserve and care for the land and the church.

==== Zoate ====
It too was a fiefdom, but it became a county only in the year 1668. In the hamlet there is a golf course and the well-known company Vortice.

==== San Barbaziano ====
San Barbaziano was a fief of the counts Melzi and of the Alari, the same ones who had the fief of Tribiano until its extinction. It is named for its parish church dedicated to Saint Barbatianus.
