= Cadoneghe =

- Comune
- Comune di Cadoneghe
- Location within Italy Location within Veneto
- Coordinates: 45°27′N 11°56′E
- Country: Italy
- Region: Veneto
- Province: Padua (PD)
- Frazioni: Mejaniga, Bragni, Bagnoli, Castagnara

Government
  - Mayor: Marco Schiesaro

Area
  - Total: 12 km^{2} (4.6 sq mi)

Population (December 31, 2017)
  - Total: 16,176
  - Density: 1,300/km^{2} (3,500/sq mi)
- Demonym: Cadoneghesi
- Time zone: UTC+1 (CET)
  - Summer (DST): UTC+2 (CEST)
- Postal code: 35010
- Dialing code: 049
- Patron saint: St. Andrew
- Saint day: November 30
- Website: Official website

Cadoneghe is a town and comune in the province of Padua, in the Veneto region of northern Italy. The town is approximately 50 kilometres (31 mi) from Venice, the capital of the region. The city is situated on the Brenta River.

Cadoneghe was once famous for being the site of the largest and most important slaughterhouse and meat company in Europe, Grosoli SpA. After the Grosoli family sold the company in the early 1980s, the company gradually lost its market and was eventually closed in the early 1990s, leaving Cadoneghe without any major industry.

Cadoneghe in 1975 was chosen as the best city of the Padova and Italy.

== Notable people ==
- Lino Cauzzo (1924–1998), professional footballer
