= Mediglia =

Mediglia Medija (Lombard)
- Comune
- Comune di Mediglia
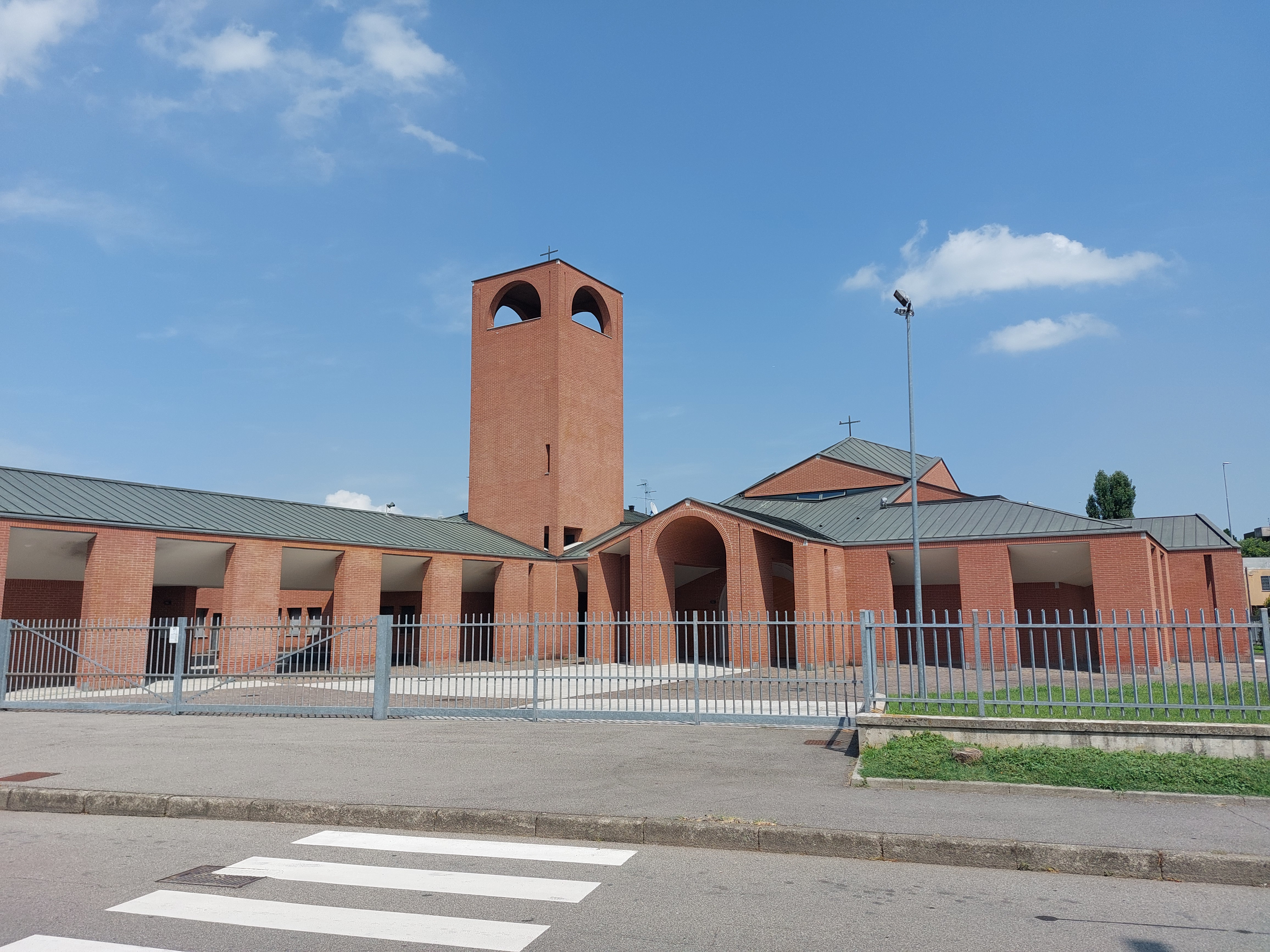
- Church of the Blessed Virgin of the Rosary

- Coat of arms

- Location within Italy Location within Lombardy
- Coordinates: 45°24′N 9°20′E
- Country: Italy
- Region: Lombardy
- Metropolitan city: Milan (MI)
- Frazioni: Bettolino di Mediglia, Bustighera, Caluzzano, Mombretto di Mediglia, Robbiano di Mediglia, San Martino Olearo, Triginto, Vigliano di Mediglia

Government
  - Mayor: Paolo Bianchi

Area
  - Total: 21.96 km^{2} (8.48 sq mi)
- Elevation: 95 m (312 ft)

Population (30 November 2017)
  - Total: 12,158
  - Density: 553.6/km^{2} (1,434/sq mi)
- Demonym: Medigliesi
- Time zone: UTC+1 (CET)
  - Summer (DST): UTC+2 (CEST)
- Postal code: 20076
- Dialing code: 02
- Website: Official website

Mediglia (Milanese: Medija) is a comune (municipality) in the Metropolitan City of Milan in the Italian region Lombardy, located about 15 kilometres (9 mi) southeast of Milan.
