= Western Lombard grammar =

This article discusses the grammar of the Western Lombard (Insubric) language. The examples are in Milanese, written according to the Classical Milanese orthography.

== General characteristics of Insubric grammar ==
The phonetical characteristics of Insubric language are the halving of consonants, the voicing of intervocalic consonants, the transformation of Latin "u" into Insubric /y/, Latin short "o" into /œ/ø/, partial transformation of long "o" into /u/, the falling of final vowels except "a", loss of Latin suffix "re" of infinitive, suffix "i" for 1st person, partial falling of intervocalic "d", partial transformation of "a" into "o" when followed by "l" and another consonant, the transformation of Latin groups "pl", "bl", "fl", "gl" into "pi", "bi", "fi", "gi" (read: dj) and of group "ct" into "c" (read: tsh), the nasalization of vowels followed by "n" or its transformation into a velar nasal, the falling of final "l" and "r" when followed by a long vowel, the distinction of vowel length, the partial transformation of intervocalic "l" into "r". The etymology of the words is very often derived from Latin. An uncommon feature for a Romance language is the extended use of idiomatic phrasal verbs (verb-particle constructions) much in the same way as in English. E.g. "trà" (to draw, to pull), "trà via" (to waste, to throw away), "trà sù" (to vomit, to throw up), "trà foeura" (to remove, to take away); "mangià" (to eat), "mangià foeura" (to squander). Unlike most Romance languages, Western Lombard has vowel quantity oppositions. Examples are:

- pas [paːs] ("peace") vs. pass [pas] ("step" or "mountain pass")
- ciapaa [t͡ʃaˈpaː] ("caught" or "got", masc.) vs. ciapà [t͡ʃaˈpa] ("to catch" or "to get").

The base vowels of Western Lombard language are: /a/ (c.m.o. "a"), /e/ (c.m.o. "e"), /ɛ/ (c.m.o. "e"), /i/ (c.m.o. "i"), /o/ (c.m.o. "o"), /ɔ/ (c.m.o. "o"), opener and closer /œ/ (c.m.o. "oeu"), /u/ (c.m.o. "o") and /y/ (c.m.o. "u").

== Syntax ==
The most frequent word order is subject–verb–object, but all the other orders are possible when there isn't any ambiguity: the inversions are commonly used to emphasise the first word. Examples are:

- Mi voo a scoeula. "I go to school."
- Voo a scoeula, mi. Again, this sentence means "I go to school" but in this case, the act of going to school wants to be emphasised.

Like the Italian language, when a proclitic pronoun is used, however, this comes before the verb and the auxiliary:

- Lù la ved. "He sees her".

The singular third person of the verb is preceded by a proclitic word ("el" for masculine subject, "la" for feminine subject: identical to definite articles) that remind the subject; the singular second person of the verb is preceded by a proclitic word ("te"). There might be, but it's optional, other proclitic words, like "a" in all the persons, or "i" in the plural third person:

- Luu el suguta a cantà. "He keeps singing."
- Lee la và in gesa. "She goes to the church."
- Ti te set ingles. "You are English."

As noted before differently from to Italian, the personal pronoun is always followed by the subject pronoun:

- Mi a voo a scoeula. / * Mi se voo a scoeula.
- Ti te set ingles.

However, similarly to Italian, in Lombard the personal pronoun can be dropped. Unlike Italian, whenever this happens the subject pronoun must not be dropped:

- A voo a scoeula. / Se voo a scoeula.
- Te set ingles.

== Articles ==
=== Definite article ===
The Insubric definite article derives from a Latin distal demonstrative, ille. It can vary according to the gender (feminine or masculine) and number (singular or plural) of the noun. The definite article takes the following forms:

	singular		plural
	before consonant	before vowel	plural
masculine	el	l'	i
feminine	la	l'	i

Like the, the Insubric definite article is used with a noun referring to a specific item when both the speaker and the audience know what the item is. It is necessary in the following cases:

Use	Example
General categories and abstractions	La pascenza a l'è on virtù. Patience is a virtue.
Name and adjective clusters	La Londra veggia a l'è bella. Old London is beauty.
Languages and academic subjects	Mi a capissi el todesch. I understand German.
Countries	Mi se voeuri visità la Franza. I want to visit France.
Mountains, rivers and lakes.	L'Ada la traversa el lach de Còmm. The Adda pass through the Como lake.
Seasons	La primavera a l'è la mia stagion preferida. Spring is my favourite season.
Titles, family names	Te i chì i Brambilla. Here are the Brambillas.
Parts of the body	El se lava i man. He washes his hands.
Possessive adjectives	El mè pader. My father.

Unlike the, the definite article is also used with mass nouns and plural nouns with generic interpretation, and with abstract nouns. For example:

- Me pias el latt. ("I like milk.")
- Me piasen i romanz. ("I like novels.")
- El capitalism ha transformaa quest paes chì. ("Capitalism has transformed this country.")

Besides, definite article is used in front of proper nouns:

- El Giovann m'ha dii. ("John told me.")
- La Sara stà de cà a Cernusch. ("Sarah lives in Cernusco.")

Western Lombard is a synthetic fusional language.

=== Indefinite article ===
The Insubric indefinite article is analogous to the English indefinite article a/an. Like a/an, the Insubric indefinite article is used with a noun referring to a non-specific item, or to a specific item when the speaker and audience do not both know what the item is; so, ho spaccaa ona cadrega rossa ("I broke a red chair"). Unlike a/an, the Insubric indefinite article has a plural form, often translated as some but usually simply omitted in English; so, gh'hinn di liber laggiò ("There are some books over there" or "There are books over there"). The indefinite article takes the following forms:

	singular	plural
masculine	on	di
feminine	ona	di

== Inflection of nouns and adjectives ==
Most of the masculine nouns and adjectives terminate without suffix. This is valid both for the singular and the plural form. Examples are:

- El milanes ("the milanese") → I milanes ("the milanese people")
- L'amis ("the friend") → I amis ("the friends")

Most of the feminine singular nouns and adjectives are formed by adding an "-a" as a suffix. The plural, instead, is the same than the masculine form.

- La milanesa ("the milanese woman") → I milanes ("the milanese women")
- L'amisa ("the girlfriend") → I amis ("the girlfriends").

=== Variants ===
Creation of the feminine form
The feminine form is not created by simply adding an "-a" when the word ends with:
- -aa, -ii, -uu → -ada, -ida, -uda

El fidanzaa ("the fiancé") → La fidanzada ("the fiancé")
Veduu ("seen", masc.) → Veduda ("seen", fem.)

Creation of the plural form for masculine nouns
Nouns do not change form when they become plural unless the word terminates with:
- -e, -o → -i

El corno ("the horn") → I corni ("the horns")

- -on → -oni (even if also "-on" is accepted)

El canton ("the corner" or "the canton") → I cantoni ("the corners" or "the cantons")

- -tt → -cc

El tett ("the roof") → I tecc ("the roofs"), unless -ett is vezzegiativ

- -ll → -j

El cavall ("the horse") → I cavaj ("horses")

- -in → if diminutive: -itt, otherwise: -in

El bagain ("the little boy") → I bagaitt ("the little boys")
but, El cammin ("the pathway") → I cammin ("the pathways")

Creation of the plural form for feminine nouns
- -a → –

La nevoda ("the granddaughter" or "the niece") → I nevod ("the granddaughters" or "the nieces")

- -nia → -gn

La linia ("the line") → I lign ("the lines")

- -ca, -ga → -ch, -gh

La cadrega ("the chair") → I cadregh ("the chairs")

- -òa, -ea → -ia
- -oa, -ua → -ov (La lengua, i lengov)

La lengua ("the tongue") → I lengov ("the tongues")

- -ma, -na → -mm, -nn

Carina ("nice", fem. sing.) → Carinn ("nice", plur.)

- -tt → -cc

La nòtt ("the night") → I nòcc ("the nights")

- -bra, -dra, -gra, -pra, -tra, -vra > -ber, -der, -gher, -per, -ter, -ver

La Scendra ("the ash") → I scender ("the ashes")

== Nouns ==
Every Insubric noun has a grammatical gender, either masculine or feminine. There is no case inflection. Articles and adjectives agree in gender and number with the noun they refer to. Usually, masculine nouns are unmarked whilst feminine nouns carry the suffix "-a"; the plural is unmarked, like the masculine feminine. Thus, the most common declension paradigm for Western Lombard names is the one that follows:

Example: declension of gatt ("cat")
	singular	plural
masculine	gatt	gatt
feminine	gatta	gatt

For exceptions, see Insubric grammar#Variants

=== Gender inflection ===
The grammatical gender of a noun referring to a human usually corresponds to the noun's natural gender (i.e. its referent's sex or gender). For such nouns, there will very often be one noun of each gender, with the choice of noun being determined by the natural gender of the person described; for example, a male writer is a scrittor, while a female writer is a scrittora. Alike other Latin languages, a plural noun that refers to both males and females is masculine.

=== Alteration ===
As in Italian, Portuguese, and Spanish, in Western Lombard altered nouns are nouns with particular shades of meaning. They are divided into diminutives, "vezzegiativ" (diminutives with kindness and sympathy nuance), augmentatives, and pejoratives.

Suffix	Role	Example	
"-on"	augmentative	alber ("tree")	alberon
"-ott"	augmentative + vezzegiativ/pejorative	scior ("mister")	sciorott ("squire")
"-in" (remember the plural form: "-itt")	diminutive	bagai ("boy")	bagain
"-ett" (remember the plural form: -itt)	diminutive + vezzegiativ	"vegg" ("old")	vegett ("old man")
"-ell"	diminutive + vezzegiativ	pover ("poor")	poverell ("poor man")
"-oeu" (solo m.)	vezzegiativ	can ("dog")	cagnoeu
"-asc"	pejorative (often in an ironic meaning)	savor ("taste")	savorasc
"-usc"	pejorative + diminutive (it's used with worthless things and people)	dottor ("actor")	dottorusc

== Pronouns ==
=== Personal pronouns ===
Western Lombard features a sizeable set of pronouns. Personal pronouns are inflected for person, number, case, and, in the third person, gender. Personal pronouns are normally dropped in the subject, as the conjugation is usually enough to determine the grammatical person. They are used when some emphasis is needed, e.g. son lombard ("I am Lombard") vs. mi son lombard ("I [specifically, as opposed to others] am Lombard").

Insubric personal pronouns
			Nominative		Dative			Accusative		Reflexive
			Tonic form	Proclitic subject	Proclitic form	Enclitic form	Stressed form	Proclitic form	Enclitic form	Reflexive
sg.	1st		mi	(a)	mi	-m	a mi	me	-m	me (se)
sg.	2nd		ti	te	ti	-t	a ti	te	-t	te se
sg.	3rd	m.	lù	el/l'	ghe	-gh	a lù	el/l'/la	-l	el se
sg.	3rd	f.	lee	la	ghe	-gh	a lee	l'/la	-la	la se
pl.	1st		num (or nunch)	(a)	ghe	-gh	a num	ghe	-gh	se
pl.	2nd	informal	vialter	(a)	ve	-v	a vialter	ve	-v	ve (se)
pl.	2nd	formal	vuu	(a)	ve	-v	a vialter	ve	-v	ve (se)
pl.	3rd		lor	i	ghe	-gh	a lor	i	-i	(i) se

=== Possessive pronouns ===
			possessed		
			singular		plural
			masculine	feminine	plural
possessor	1st person	singular	el mè	la mia	i mè
possessor	1st person	plural	el noster	la nostra	i noster
possessor	2nd person	singular	el tò	la tua	i tò
possessor	2nd person	plural	el voster	la vostra	i voster
possessor	3rd person	singular	el sò	la sua	i soeu
possessor	3rd person	plural	el sò	la sua	i soeu

== Verbs ==
Western Lombard verbs express an action or a state of being of a given subject, and like verbs in most of the Indo-European languages, Insubric verbs undergo inflection according to the following categories:

- Tense: past, present or future.
- Mood: indicative, subjunctive, conditional, imperative, infinitive, gerundive or participle.
- Aspect: perfective or imperfective.
- Voice: active or passive.

Verbs in the finite moods (indicative, imperative, subjunctive, and conditional) are conjugated to agree with their subjects in person (first, second, or third) and number (singular or plural). As in Italian, the subject may be tacit (Insubric is a null-subject language). Auxiliary verbs are combined with past participles of main verbs to produce compound tenses. For most main verbs the auxiliary is (the appropriate form of) avè ("to have"), but for reflexive verbs and certain intransitive verbs the auxiliary is a form of vess ("to be"). The participle agrees with the subject when the auxiliary is vess. Forms of vess are also used with the past participles of transitive verbs to form the passive voice. Unlike other Romance languages, in Western Lombard it does exist the negative form of the imperative. Insubric has four conjugations:

- The first conjugation class consists of all verbs with infinitives ending in "-à".
- The second conjugation class consists of all verbs with infinitives in "-è" (included the verb avè, "to have").
- The third conjugation class consists of all other verbs terminating with a consonant (included the verb vess, "to be").
- The fourth conjugation class consists of all verbs with infinitives in "-ì".

Unlike other Neo-Latin languages, Lombard language presents a characteristic probably inherited from the prolonged past contact – Sprachbund – with Germanic languages and dialects such as Allemannic, this is the presence of Phrasal Verbs / Compound (linguistics):

- Fa foeura – To do in / To eat up / To squander.
- Dà denter – To trade in / to bump into.
- Catà su – To pick up (literally as in English).
- Borlà giò – To fall down (literally as in English).
- Netà su / Lava’ su – To wash up (literally as in English).
- Trà su – To throw up (literally as in English).
- Trà vìa / Sc`jacá vìa – To throw away (literally as in English).
- Sàrà su – To lock up (literally as in English).
- Dà vià – To give away (literally as in English).
- Setáś giò – To sit down (literally as in English).

== Adverbs ==
=== Modal adverbs ===
An adjective can be made into a modal adverb by adding -ment (analogous to the English "-ly") to the ending of the feminine singular form of the adjective. E.g.:

- giusta ("correct", fem.) becomes giustament ("correctly")
- vera ("true", fem.) becomes verament ("truly")

Adjectives ending in -r or -l simply add -ment:

- fazzil ("easy") becomes fazzilment ("easily")
- particolar ("particular") becomes particolarment ("particularly")

In other cases, a periphrasis is used instead:

- a la svelta ("quickly")
- adasi adasi ("slowly")

There are also some cases of adverbs that are typically Insubric:

- abellasi ("slowly")
- inevid ("unwillingly")

Adverbial phrase are really common in Western Lombard:

- in genoggion ("on one's knees")
- a tomborlon ("head-over-heels", "upside down")
- de balossett ("cunningly")
- de cativ ("badly" or "wrongly")

=== Adverbs of space ===
- davaant ("in front")
- ananz / inanz ("forward")
- de dree ("behind / on the back")
- in meś ("between")
- arént ("near / adjacent / close")
- luntan ("away / abroad / a part")
- de part ("on the side")
- de sura ("upon / above")
- de surevia ("on / over")
- de suta ("under / below")
- derént ("inside")
- de foeura ("outside")

=== Adverbs of time ===
- adess ("now")
- poeu ("then")
- incoeu ("today")
- ier ("yesterday")
- doman ("tomorrow")
- prima ("before")
- despoeu, depos ("after")
- semper ("always")
- de spess ("often")
- jamò ("already")
- mai ("never")
- ancamò, amò ("again")
- gnancamò, nonamò ("not yet")

== Prepositions ==
Western Lombard prepositions link two related parts of a sentence. In word order, they are placed in front of a noun in order to specify the relationship between the noun and the verb, adjective, or other noun that precedes it. The basic Insubric prepositions are:

- de ("from", "of", "about")
- a ("to", "at")
- da ("from", "by", "since")
- in ("in", "on", "to")
- cunt ("with"), cun when followed by consonant
- su ("on")
- per ("for", "through")
- intra ("between", "among")
- suta ("under")
- sura ("upon")
- surevia ("over, on")

Süra, sürevia and süta are prepositions and, rarely, adverbs: the corresponding adverbs are de süra, de sürevia and de süta. The basic prepositions de, a and su can be combined with an article (only el and i) to create an articulated preposition:

	de	a	su
+ el	del	al	sul
+ la	de la	a la	su la
+ i	di	ai	sui

To make the basic preposition in an articulated one, the articulated form of the preposition de must be used: in + el forms in del, in + la forms in de la, and in + i forms in di.

== Subdivision ==
Insubric grammar has some geographical mutation. The main sections can be:

- Milanese grammar
- Southwestern Lombard grammars
- Brianzoeu, Comasco-Lecchese, Varesino and Ticinese grammars
- Alpine Lombard grammar

== Bibliography ==
- Andrea Rognoni, Grammatica dei Dialetti della Lombardia, Oscar Mondadori
