= Spasell =

Slang of Lombard

- Spasello
- Native to: Italy
- Region: Valassina
- Extinct: 19th century
- Language family: Indo-European: Italic; Latino-Faliscan; Romance; Italo-Western; Western Romance; Gallo-Romance; Gallo-Italic; Lombard; Western Lombard; Spasell

Language codes
- ISO 639-3: –
- Glottolog: None

Spasell is an extinct slang of Insubric language, spoken until the 19th century by inhabitants of Valassina, when they used to go out from the valley for business and they didn't want to be understood by the people. It is characterized by code-words conventionally defined basing on characteristics of the thing or on onomatopoeias; other words have an unknown origin. It has been noted by Carlo Mazza, vicar of Asso, in his book Memorie storiche della Vallassina of 1796. He informs us that several slangs have been created in the time, because in the time the words were introduced in the current language, reducing the differences between "official" language and "secret" language. After a list of terms, the vicar proposes, as example, the translation of Pater Noster in this language, evidencing that it's totally incomprehensible also by the Insubric speakers. There are various similar or identical slangs in many localities of Insubria, like Valtellina and Milan. Some Spasell words have been adsorbed by the common language, for example lòfi (see Spasell loffi=bad), used in northern Brianza to indicate a "so and so" person, or scabbi, used also by Carlo Porta in the poem Brindes de Meneghin a l'Ostaria to refer to wine, in alternation with vin.

Masett che stanziê in la creuggia di salvestri,
ch'el vost oden s'ingalmissa,
ch'el stanzia el nost bosin piatt,
che se rusca quel che vu tubè
sora i masett de la luscia, quant in quella di sciatt.
Refilên el sbêg de stobold,
e che no va stanzien nippa in del scimêe i nost lenarii,
come anch'el nost'oden szabolda ai olter ghielma;
Fêen taruscia la schigna che ne rusca el Naja de Tameu.
Per tagiorala no lassên sciobigà in nient de loffi.
AMEN.

— El «Pater Noster» in spaselll

Some Spasell words in Classical Milanese orthography:

- albarej - eggs (Vallassinese of Asso: ööf)
- arton - bread (pan)
- astregg - omelet (fritada)
- bajaff - weapon (arma)
- bald - day (dì)
- ballina - hour (ura)
- bell - sun (suu)
- bella - moon (lüna)
- belledra - sheep (pégura, barina)
- bighês - lover (muruus)
- boffaroeu - firearm (s'ciòp)
- bolla - people, community (géent)
- boschiroeura - hazelnut (nisciöla)
- bosin - master (padrón)
- bronza - bell (campana)
- bruna - night (nòcc)
- brunej - eyes (öcc)
- calcant - beggar (pitòch)
- calcosa - street (straa)
- Capellura - Our Lady (Madòna)
- Capelluu - God (Signuur)
- cer - white (biaanch)
- croeuggia - house (cà)
- croeulla - storm (tempèsta)
- daga - sword (spada)
- degoeuj - salad (nsalada)
- fangôs - shoes (scaarp)
- faree - black (négher)
- ficcà el vel - to go (ndà)
- fogatta - red (rós)
- foja - fear (pagüra, strimizi)
- follon - fear (pagüra, strimizi)
- fortin - vinegar (asée)
- fraina - snow (néef)
- fratessa - pocket (sacòcia)
- ghisalba - blind (òorp)
- gialdin - coin (zechin)
- gianderoeu - peach (pèrsega)
- gnifell - son (bagaj)
- griera - prison (prisón)
- gringaja - bell (campana)
- inciappinà - to become drunk (imbriagas)
- infioeura - chestnut (castègna)
- ingalmì - to understand (capì)
- lescia - garlic (aj)
- levesa - chestnut (castègna)
- loffi - bad (gram)
- longôs - year (ann, agn)
- longosin - month (mées)
- lumà - to see (vedè)
- lumart - mirror (spècc)
- luscia - water, rain (aqua)
- luscià - to cry (piaanc, caragnà)
- luscia del Capelluu - blessed water (aqua santa)
- luscion piatt - sea (maar)
- mager - good (bón)
- manìa - woman (dòna)
- masett - father (pà)
- masett de la luscia - cloud (nìula)
- masetta - mother (mam)
- mugenga - cow (vaca)
- muginghera - cowshed (stala)
- naja de tamoeu - devil (diàul)
- nold - grandfather (nònu)
- percà - to see (vedè)
- picch - hammer (martèl)
- pisto - priest (préet)
- prumm - pig (purcèl)
- quella di sciatt - earth, ground (tèra)
- rabbaja - polenta (pulénta)
- refald - hot (caalt)
- refilà - to give (dà)
- ruscà - to do (fà)
- ruspanda - hen (gaìna)
- ruspandon - cock (gal)
- saltarella - hare (légura)
- sbalada - death (mòort)
- sbeg - bread (pan)
- sbelledrà - to sing (cantà)
- sbertì - to kill (mazà)
- sbertidor - executioner (bòja)
- sboja-tambell - notary (nudaar)
- scabi - wine (vin)
- scabià - to drink (béef)
- scajà - to pay (pagà)
- sciucchesta - pint (pinta)
- sciucch - mug
- scoffenà - to work (laurà)
- scoloeu - hat (capèl)
- scoloeu de la croeuggia - roof (tècc)
- scovagioeu - handkerchief (panèt)
- seguacc - lake (laach)
- sgorattin - bird (üsèl)
- sguinz - fish (pès)
- silvestra - candlelight (lüm)
- slenza - rain (aqua)
- spiazz - priest (préet)
- spiazz de la bolla - vicar (cürat, prevòst)
- spolverenta - flour (farina)
- stanzià - to be, to have, to stay (vès, vèch, stà)
- stobald - today (incöö)
- sudà - to inebriate (imbriagas)
- szabolda - to be silent (tasè)
- tabacca - beard (barba)
- tabacchin - (pizèt)
- tambell - cards (caart)
- tambosna - pumpkin (züca)
- tamera - night (nòcc)
- tavolà - to come (vignì)
- tavolà la fraina - to snow (vignì la néef)
- tisell - cold (frècc)
- toff - gun (s'ciupetada)
- traversa - tablecloth (tuaja)
- tubà - to say (dì)
- vedrosin - glass (bicéer)
- vertera - door (pòrta)

== Bibliography ==
- Carlo Mazza, Memorie storiche della Vallassina, 1796 (PARTE SECONDA, CAPO XII)
