= Varesino dialect =

Western Lombard dialect of Italy

Varesino
- Varesotto
- Bosin
- Native to: Italy
- Language family: Indo-European: Italic; Latino-Faliscan; Romance; Italo-Western; Western Romance; Gallo-Romance; Gallo-Italic; Lombard–Piedmontese?; Lombard; Western Lombard; Varesino

Language codes
- ISO 639-3: –
- Glottolog: None

Varesino, Varesotto or Bosin (from the name of storytellers; see bosinada) is a dialect of Western Lombard language spoken in the Central province of Varese. The Northern side speaks more Ticinese than Bosin. The Southern side speaks more Bustocco.

== Example ==
=== Ta sa regordat? by Speri Della Chiesa Jemoli ===
Ta sa regordat – ra mè Luzzietta
Ra pruma volta – ca s'hemm parlaa?...
L'eva la festa – dra Schiranetta...
S'hemm trovaa insemma – là in sul segraa

Gh'evat ra vesta – tutta infiorava...
Par datt ra mœusta – t'ho pizzigaa...
Set vugnùa rossa – mi ta vardava...
M'het dai 'na s'giaffa – mi l'ho ciappaa...

Ma la tò sciampa – l'eva tant bella
Che in su ra faccia – l'ha mia fai maa...
Ra pâs l'hemm faia – cont la pommella,
Pessitt, gazzosa – zuccor firaa...

T'ho tœuj dò zòccor – con su ra galla...
Ra mè parolla – ti l'het 'cettaa...
(Gh'eva da scorta – tre vacch in stalla)
E dopo Pasqua – sa s'hemm sposaa...

Mò ti set veggia – ra mè Luzzietta,
E mi, a fa 'r màrtor – sont giò da straa...
Ma quand ca vedi – ra Schiranetta
Senti anmò i stréppit – da innemoraa!

...

=== Translation (Do you remember?) ===
Do you remember – my sweet Lucia
The first time – we talked to each other?...
It was the festival – [of the sanctuary] of the Schirannetta...
We met – there on the parvis

You wore a dress – all flowery...
To rush you – I pinched you...
You blushed – as I stared at you...
You slapped me – I got your slap...

But your hand [lit. '"paw"'] – was so pretty
That on my face – it never hurt...
We made peace – with a small apple,
Small fish, soda – and cotton candy...

I bought you two hooves – with a bow on...
My word – you accepted it...
(I kept in stock – three cows in the byre)
And after Easter – we got married...

Now you are old – my sweet Lucia,
And I am no longer able – to play the fool...
But when I see – the Schirannetta
I still hear the sounds – I used to hear as your valentine!
