= Barbapedana =

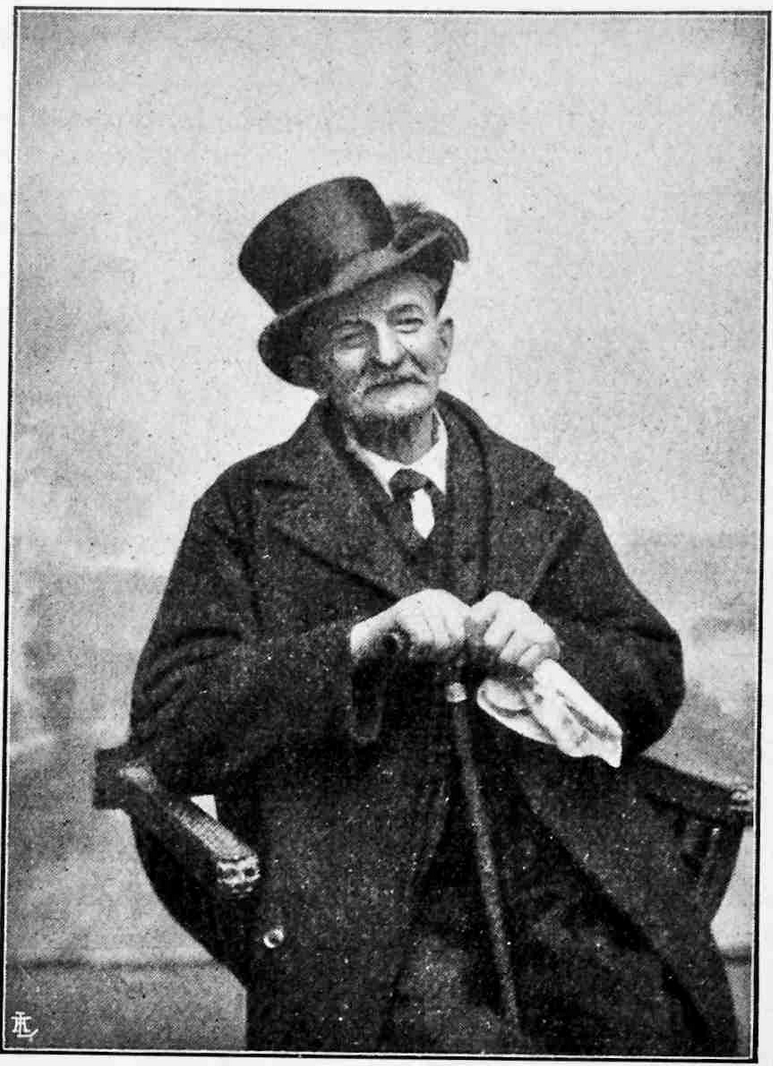
Image Barbapedana

Barbapedana (Milanese: Barbapedanna) is a word of uncertain origin that refers to a Milanese minstrel and cantastorie ("story singer") that sang in such places as trani (the Milanese traditional osterie, i.e., pubs). While the word "barbapedana" dates back at least to the 17th century, "the Barbapedana" per antonomasia was Enrico Molaschi, active in the late 19th century. Many rhymes from his repertoire have remained in the popular culture of Milan; for example, this is the case for the lines that Barbapedana sang to describe himself (such as Barbapedanna el gh'aveva on gilé / Rott per denanz e strasciaa per dedree; that is, "Barbapedana wore a gilet, broken in front and ripped off in the back") and for the nursery rhyme De piscinin che l'era ("So small he was"), about a man who was so small that he could do such things as "dance on top of a coin" or "make 200 shirts out of a piece of fabric".

== History of the Barbapedana ==
The origin and meaning of the word "barbapedana" are uncertain. Poetry by some "Barba Pedana" from Veneto, dating back to the 17th century, is reportedly preserved in the Biblioteca di San Marco in Venice. Jean-Jacques Rousseau, in his Confessions, mentions a cousin nicknamed "Barna Bredanna". While it is unclear whether there is any relation between these and Barbapedana, it is reasonable to believe that the Milanese minstrels of the 17th century were representatives of an older tradition that possibly extended across northern Italy and other areas of southern Europe.

The oldest known reference to the word "barbapedana" is possibly found in Carlo Maria Maggi's dialectal play Il Barone di Birbanza (1696; lines 324–325): L'ho dij par quij che porten la capascia / fin de Barbapedanna / che fa bandera su la durlindanna, where Barbapedanna is described as someone who puts his cloak on top of his sword's grip, like a flag; this is supposedly a reference to the habits of the dandy, playful Milanese youth of the time. Poet Gaetano Crespi reports an anonymous poem, also of the 17th century, which has this reference to the "cloak appended to the sword" (possibly an influence of Maggi's works), but otherwise describes the Barbapedana as a funny minstrel, and states that the cloak's lining was ripped off, that the man was "a man of Carnival" (homm de carnevaee) and that he was "one span tall" (volt una spanna), all of which are direct references to Barbapedana's most popular tunes:

Barbapedanna havevel 'na capascia
Senza color, con la fodraeda strascia;
L'era bandera sü la dürlindanna
Quand le portaeva in gir Barbapedanna.
L'era homm de carnevaee volt una spanna
E quest'even nomace Barbapedanna
L'eva st'homm inscì tant piscinin
C'al posseva balà ben sü on quatrin.

— Anonymous, 17th century

As this description includes the main traits of the Barbapedana as it is remembered today, and even obvious references to his most popular songs, it can easily be argued that an essentially unchanged Barbapedana "heritage" was passed over from one generation to the next, at least since the 17th century and possibly earlier, down to the last representatives of the genre, who were active in the early 20th century.

== Enrico Molaschi ==
The best known interpreter of the "barbapedana" was Enrico Molaschi (1823–1911). A description of his figure and style is found in several sources of the time, including Arrigo Boito's essay on traditional street music, an essay on Milanese traditions by Severino Pagani, and a book of Milanese poet and scholar Luigi Medici. According to these sources, Molaschi had met a former "Barbapedana" in the outskirts of Milan, in the area of Paullo, and later took on his heritage. After becoming a popular minstrel himself, in 1862, Molaschi relocated with his family to Milan, namely to a house in the district of Porta Tosa. Besides playing in the osterie, he was invited at celebrations, and in summer he was a regular of the garden parties in the luxury villas in Brianza. He was so popular that Queen Margherita of Savoy invited him to play for her in the Royal Villa of Monza; also, one year he was honoured with the role of "king of the Carnevale Ambrosiano" (Milan's carnival). In any case, especially in the last part of his life, Molaschi usually played in the area of what are now Piazzale Loreto and Corso Buenos Aires.

Boito, who could actually see Barbapedana Molaschi play when Molaschi was in his 40s, describes him as surprising musician and a guitar virtuoso, and as a muscular and energetic man. Pagani and Medici, on the other hand, describe Molaschi as an old man (in the early 20th century), depicting him as short and rather fat, wearing an old dark coat and a top hat adorned with a squirrel's tail.

Barbapedana's most popular songs were the forementioned De piscinin che l'era and Barbapedanna el gh'avea on gilé, and La tegnoeura ("the bat"), with lyrics by Milanese poet Averardo Buschi. Anyway, he usually adapted these songs to the audience he played for, so that his exhibitions were always partially based on improvisation; for this reason, he is also remembered as an interpreter of the bosinada, a Milanese literary genre that is based on dialectal improvisation in verses.

Molaschi performed until the early 20th century; by then, he had lost his teeth; as he could hardly sing, he mostly whistled his tunes. He was eventually admitted to the "Baggina" retirement home, where he died on 26 October 1911. His guitar (created in 1823 by renowned Milanese luthier Antonio Rovetta) is now exposed at the Museum of Musical Instruments of Milan.

Molaschi's heritage greatly contributed to the Barbapedana tradition and to the Milanese folklore in general. For example, it is a consequence of Molaschi's great popularity if the song De piscinin che l'era, that actually predates the 19th century and is traditional of most of northern Italy, is usually referred to as a "typical milanese song".

== After Enrico Molaschi ==
Molaschi was not the last Barbapedana, although the tradition began to fade after his death. Ethnomusicologist Roberto Leydi accounts for at least another Barbapedana claiming to be Molaschi's direct heir, active in the first half of the 20th century; and Luigi Veronelli mentions a "Barbapedana" Sandro Zonca who was a regular guest at the "Bocciofila Martesana" (a bocce club on the Navigli), who was "problematic" and "indulged in profanity", a fact that Veronelli ascribes to Zonca's awareness of the fact that he was "one of the last".

== References in popular culture ==
The traditional songs by Barbapedana have been recorded by several authors; a notable example is Nanni Svampa's recording of È tornato Barbapedana ("Barbapedana is back"). Barbapedana is also the name of an Italian kletzmer band.
