= Taches al tram =

Taches al tram (Milanese; English: hang on to the tram) is an expression in the Milanese dialect of Italian. It is used to indicate that someone is left to their own devices or must take care of their own problems. Figuratively, it can also describe suffering a loss or disappointment, or feeling powerless in a difficult situation. In everyday language, the phrase can be used euphemistically as an insult or for mockery.

== Meaning and usage ==
The expression taches al tram is used to show that a problem does not concern someone and that the interlocutor must fend for themselves. Similar phrases in Italian include attaccarsi al tram. The phrase conveys the idea of literally hanging onto a passing tram to leave a problem behind or to find one’s own way.

Example:

- Non so cosa farci, attaccati al tram! – "I don’t know what to do about it, hang yourself on the tram!"

== Historical and cultural context ==
In Milan, the expression is part of local idiomatic speech and is often used to express disapproval, dismissal, or indifference toward a concern. It is typical of the pragmatic and sometimes slightly mocking tone of the Milanese dialect.

== International recognition ==
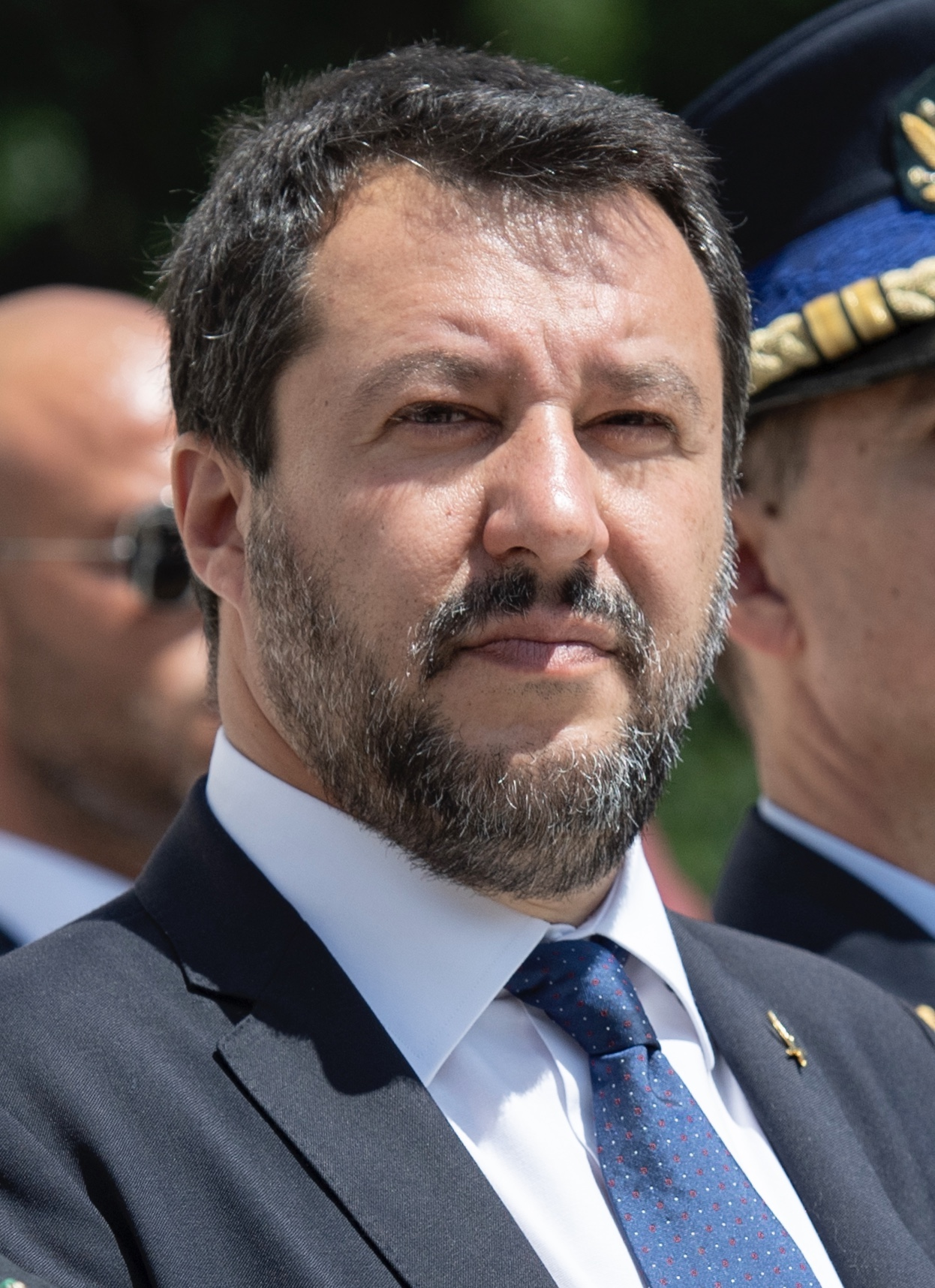
Matteo Salvini

The expression gained international attention when Italian politician Matteo Salvini used it in August 2025 in the context of the Ukraine crisis. During an event in his hometown of Milan, Salvini told French President Emmanuel Macron to taches al tram, essentially telling him to "hang on to the tram." He then added polemically:

Put on a helmet, wear a vest, grab a rifle, and go to Ukraine. (Italian: Ti metti il caschetto, il giubbetto, il fucile e vai in Ucraina. - French: Tu mets ton casque, ta veste, ton fusil et tu vas en Ukraine. - German: Setz dir einen Helm auf, zieh eine Weste an, schnapp dir ein Gewehr und geh in die Ukraine.)

This statement referred to France's discussion about a possible troop deployment to Ukraine and was perceived as provocative by French authorities. Consequently, the Italian ambassador in France was summoned by the Quai d'Orsay.

== Bibliography ==
- Silvia Frau: 500 Hidden Secrets Mailand – Die besten Tipps und Adressen der Locals. 2022. (in German)
