= Lodigiano =

Lodigiano may refer to:

- Any of a number of communes and institutions in the Italian city (and province) of Lodi
- Lodigiano, a type of Western Lombard dialect
