= Western Lombard dialects =

Group of Lombard dialects

Western Lombard
- Milanes/Milanées, Insubrigh/Insübrich, lumbard ucidental
- Native to: Italy, Switzerland
- Region: Italy (Lombardy, Piedmont); Switzerland (Ticino, Grisons)
- Ethnicity: Insubrians
- Native speakers: Unknown
- Language family: Indo-European: Italic; Latino-Faliscan; Romance; Italo-Western; Western Romance; Gallo-Romance; Gallo-Italic; Lombard; Western Lombard
- Dialects: Brianzöö; Bustocco-Legnanese; Comasco-Lecchese; Milanese; Novarese; Southwestern Lombard; Ticinese; Varesino

Language codes
- ISO 639-3: –
- Glottolog: west2343
- Linguasphere: ... 51-AAA-odj 51-AAA-odd ... 51-AAA-odj

Western Lombard is a group of varieties of the Lombard language, a Romance language of the Gallo-Italic subgroup. It is spoken primarily in Italy and Switzerland. Within Italy, it is prevalent in the Lombard provinces of Milan, Monza and Brianza, Varese, Como, Lecco, Sondrio, and parts of Cremona (excluding Crema and its immediate surroundings), Lodi, and Pavia. In Piedmont, it is spoken in the provinces of Novara, Verbano-Cusio-Ossola, the eastern area of the Province of Alessandria (around Tortona), and a small part of Vercelli (Valsesia). In Switzerland, Western Lombard is spoken in the canton of Ticino and part of the canton of Graubünden.

Due to its historical association with the Duchy of Milan, Western Lombard is frequently referred to as Insubric (from Insubria and Insubres) or Milanese. The term Cisabduan ("Cisabduano", literally "on this side of the Adda River") is also used, particularly in linguistic contexts, following the terminology introduced by Clemente Merlo.

== Relationship with Italian ==
In Italian-speaking contexts, Western Lombard is often mistakenly described as a dialect of Italian. However, Western Lombard and Standard Italian are distinct languages that are not mutually intelligible. While some speakers of different Lombard varieties may experience difficulties in understanding each other and might rely on a standard form for communication, varieties of Western Lombard are generally mutually intelligible. Western Lombard is considered relatively homogeneous compared to Eastern Lombard, although it exhibits some internal variations. These variations primarily involve differences in the pronunciation of the vowels /o/, /ɔ/, and the development of the affricate /ts/ into the fricative /s/.

Western Lombard lacks official status in Lombardy or any other region where it is spoken. Italian is the sole official language in Lombardy.

== Grammar ==
The following outlines the diachronic trends in Western Lombard plural declension, using Milanese orthography as a reference.

=== Feminine nouns ===
Most feminine nouns end in the inflection -a in the singular. The feminine plural form is typically non-inflected (e.g., singular la legora / plural i legor; singular la cadrega / plural i cadregh). The final vowel retains its original length, which is often long when followed by a voiced consonant and short when followed by a voiceless consonant. In certain cases, when the noun stem ends in specific consonant clusters, a final -i or a schwa may be inserted between consonants (for example, in Milanese: singular scendra, plural scendr > scender). For adjectives, the plural and masculine forms are frequently identical.

=== Masculine nouns ===
The majority of masculine nouns are uninflected, with the masculine plural always being non-inflected (e.g., singular el tramvaj / plural i tramvaj; singular el lett / plural i lett). When the noun stem concludes with particular consonant groups, both singular and plural forms may insert a schwa between consonants. Otherwise, a final -o (pronounced /u/) is added to singular nouns, and -i is added for plurals.

Masculine nouns ending in -in or, less commonly, -ett, form plurals in -itt (e.g., singular fiolin / plural fiolitt). Nouns ending in -ll have plurals in -j (e.g., singular el sidell / plural i sidej; singular el porscell / plural i porscej; singular el cavall / plural i cavaj). This pattern is also observed in the determinate article: singular ell > el, plural elli > ej > i.

Masculine nouns ending in -a are invariable and are generally proper nouns, words of Ancient Greek origin, or idiomatic terms such as pirla, a derogatory term for a person.

== Varieties ==
Western Lombard can be broadly categorized into four main dialect groups: lombardo alpino (spoken in the provinces of Sondrio and Verbania, the Sopraceneri region of Canton Ticino, and in Graubünden, Switzerland), lombardo-prealpino occidentale (spoken in the provinces of Como, Varese, and Lecco, as well as Lugano and neighboring areas in Canton Ticino), basso-lombardo occidentale (Pavia and Lodi), and macromilanese (provinces of Milan, Monza, Novara, and Valsesia in Vercelli). These boundaries are approximations, as linguistic borders are not always congruent with political divisions such as provinces and municipalities.

Examples of Western Lombard varieties include:

Milanese or Meneghin (macromilanese)

Bustocco-Legnanese

Brianzöö (lombardo-prealpino occidentale - macromilanese)

Monzese

Comasco-Lecchese (lombardo-prealpino occidentale)

  - Comasco
  - Laghée
  - Intelvese
  - Vallassinese
  - Lecchese
  - Valsassinese
  - Ossolano

Varesino or Bosin (lombardo-prealpino occidentale)

Alpine Lombard (lombardo alpino, influenced by Ladin)

  - Valtellinese
  - Chiavennasco

Ticinese (lombardo alpino) (influenced by Ladin)

Southwestern Lombard (basso-lombardo occidentale)

  - Pavese (influenced by Emilian-Romagnol, Piedmontese, and Ligurian)
  - Ludesan (influenced by Emilian)
  - Nuaresat (lombardo-prealpino occidentale - macromilanese)
  - Cremunéez (influenced by Emilian-Romagnol)

Slangs

  - Spasell

== Phonology ==
The following information is based on the Milanese dialect:

=== Consonants ===
		Labial	Dental/ Alveolar	Post- alveolar	Palatal	Velar
Stop/ Affricate	voiceless	p	t	t͡ʃ		k
Stop/ Affricate	voiced	b	d	d͡ʒ		ɡ
Fricative	voiceless	f	s	ʃ		
Fricative	voiced	v	z	ʒ		
Nasal		m	n		ɲ	(ŋ)
Rhotic			r			
Approximant	lateral		l		(ʎ)	
Approximant	median				j	w

- [ŋ] occurs only as a nasal sound before velar stops.
- The central approximant sounds /j w/ are mainly heard as allophones of /i u/ when preceding vowels.
- [ʎ] is not typically pronounced, and only occurs in a few words from Italian.

=== Vowels ===
	Front		Central	Back	
Close	i ĩ	y ỹ		u ũ	
Close-mid	e ẽ				
Open-mid	ɛ	œ		ɔ	
Open			a ã	ɑ	(ɒ)

- A double vowel aa is pronounced as [ɑː] or [ɒː]. /a/ may also be pronounced as [ɑ].

== Orthography ==
The Classical Milanese orthography is the most historically significant writing system for Western Lombard. It was employed by prominent authors such as Carlo Porta (1775–1821) and Delio Tessa (1886–1939), and refined by the Circolo Filologico di Milano. Besides Classical Milanese, other orthographic systems exist, including Ticinese, Comasca, Bosina, Nuaresat, and Lecchese.

== Literature ==
Western Lombard literature emerged in the 13th century with figures like Pietro da Barsegapè from Milan and Girard Pateg from Cremona. Uguccione da Lodi, roughly contemporary, authored the Libro, a poem of 702 verses addressing the creation of the world, the torments of hell, and moral themes.

Bonvesin da la Riva, a teacher of grammar, was a notable writer from the latter half of the 13th century. He produced works in both Latin and the vernacular. His most recognized work is Liber di Tre Scricciur, an ascetic poem that explores human existence and the twelve pains of Hell (Scrittura negra), the Passion of Christ (Scrittura rossa), and the death of the righteous and the twelve joys of Paradise (Scrittura dorata).

The late 15th century witnessed the development of Western Lombard literature, with poets such as Andrea Marone (1474-1527) and Lancino Curti (1460-1512). A notable work from the Renaissance period is Rabisch (“Arabesque"), a collection of poems published in 1589 by the Milanese painter and literary theorist Gian Paolo Lomazzo. Written in an invented language drawing from rural Lombard valley dialects, the collection features an unconventional narrative incorporating exotic animals, grotesque characters, and fantastical creatures.

More realistic depictions of plebeian life are found in the Canzoni of Fabio Varese (c. 1570-1630), a poète maudit of the early 17th century. These works, published only recently after a period of moralistic suppression, mark a shift towards social realism in Western Lombard literature. Simultaneously, Western Lombard varieties began to be used in theatre. Francesco de Lemene, an Arcadian playwright (1634-1704), contributed with plays like La sposa Francesca. Carlo Maria Maggi further developed dialect theatre, and his bilingual poetry and plays elevated Milanese dialect literature significantly. His works are characterized by a serious moral perspective and linguistic experimentation, ranging from dialectal plurilingualism in Il barone di Birbanza to social linguistic stratification in his later plays.

Maggi's dialect plays celebrate Milanese as a language, describing it in Concorso de' Meneghini as clear, unaffected, and seemingly "made on purpose just to tell the truth" (‘che apposta la pär fä / par dì la veritä’). They also established the archetypal Milanese character Meneghino, a sensible, patient, and pragmatic plebeian servant, and depicted the ‘verzee’, Milan's main vegetable market, as a place of authentic and spontaneous Milanese culture in Barone di Birbanza.

Satirical poetry flourished in the 18th century, with Domenico Balestrieri and Carlo Antonio Tanzi (1710-1762) as prominent figures. This era also saw linguistic debates regarding the value and status of dialects.

Milanese dialect poetry reached a peak in the early 19th century with authors like Carlo Porta and Tommaso Grossi. Porta's extensive poems and sonnets, ranging from Enlightenment-era works like I desgrazzi de Giovannin Bongee to Romantic social portraits such as La Ninetta del Verzee, Lament del Marchionn di gamb avert, and La nomina del cappellan, are particularly significant. These poems focus on the lives of the marginalized and impoverished, reflecting the emerging European emphasis on human rights. Despite anti-dialect sentiments among some literary circles, dialects became a medium for significant literary works. Recent scholarship suggests a substantial linguistic and poetic influence of Porta's work on Manzoni's novel The Betrothed.

Late 19th-century dialect theatre included comedies by Edoardo Ferravilla (1846-1916) and Carlo Bertolazzi (1870-1916). In the 20th century, as spoken use of dialects declined, they evolved into poetic languages. Delio Tessa and Franco Loi are considered important Italian dialect poets of the 20th century.

Today, a substantial body of Western Lombard literature exists, including dictionaries, grammars, and a 2020 translation of the Gospels into a narrative of the life of Christ.

== See also ==
Languages of Italy

Milanese

Insubric literature

Romance languages

== Bibliography ==
Haller, Hermann W. (1999). The Other Italy: The Literary Canon in Dialect. Toronto: University of Toronto Press. ISBN 0802044247.

Claudio Beretta, ed. (2003). Parlate e dialetti della Lombardia. Lessico comparato. Milan: Mondadori. ISBN 978-8804514756.

Rognoni, Andrea (2005). Grammatica dei dialetti della Lombardia. Milan: Oscar Mondadori. ISBN 978-8804546467.
