= Novarese Lombard =

Western Lombard dialect

Novarese
- Nuares
- Native to: Italy
- Language family: Indo-European: Italic; Latino-Faliscan; Romance; Italo-Western; Western Romance; Gallo-Romance; Gallo-Italic; Lombard–Piedmontese?; Lombard; Western Lombard; Southwestern Lombard; Novarese

Language codes
- ISO 639-3: –
- Glottolog: nova1239

Novarese, locally pronounced Nuares, is a dialect of the Western Lombard language spoken in the province of Novara (Piedmont).

The dialect is rarely used in the city, where the use of Italian language is preferred, largely because of high immigration from Mezzogiorno; Novarese is more often used in the surrounding rural areas. There are some elements of transition with the Piedmontese language, particularly on the eastern coasts of the Sesia river, creating several transition dialects.
