= Southwestern Lombard =

Western Lombard dialects

- Native to: Italy
- Native speakers: (undated figure of 300,000)
- Language family: Indo-European: Italic; Latino-Faliscan; Romance; Italo-Western; Western Romance; Gallo-Romance; Gallo-Italic; Lombard–Piedmontese?; Lombard; Western Lombard; Southwestern Lombard
- Dialects: Cremunés; Novarese; Pavese

Language codes
- ISO 639-3: –
- Glottolog: None

Southwestern Lombard is a group of dialects of Western Lombard language spoken in the provinces of Pavia, Lodi, Novara, Cremona, in the south of the historic Insubria, and comprises Pavese, Ludesan, Novarese, Cremunés and others.

== Bibliography ==
- Rognoni, Andrea (2005). Grammatica dei dialetti della Lombardia (in Italian). Oscar Mondadori. ISBN 978-88-04-54646-7.
