= Classical Milanese orthography =

Language Orthography

The classical Milanese orthography is the orthography used for the Western Lombard language, in particular for the Milanese dialect, by the major poets and writers of this literature, such as Carlo Porta, Carlo Maria Maggi, Delio Tessa, etc. It was first used in the seventeenth century by Carlo Maria Maggi; Maggi first introduced the trigram oeu, while previous authors, like Bonvesin de la Riva (thirteenth century), used Latinizing orthographies. In 1606 G. A. Biffi with his Prissian de Milan de la parnonzia milanesa began the first codification, incorporating vowel length and the use of ou to represent the sound /œ/. The classical orthography came as a compromise between the old Tuscan system and the French one; the characteristic that considerably differentiates this orthography from effective pronunciation is the method for the distinction of long and short vowels. As of today, because it has become more archaic, it is often replaced by simpler methods that use signs ö, ü for front rounded vowels and the redoubling of vowels for long vowels. The classical orthography was regularized in the 1990s by the Circolo Filologico Milanese for modern use.

The classical Milanese orthography (as edited by Circolo Filologico Milanese) has the following conventions that differ from the Italian alphabet.

General use of accents:

- acute accent: indicates a closed sound in e or o (⟨é⟩ /e/ and ⟨ó⟩ /o/ respectively, as in Italian)
- grave accent: indicates an open sound in e or o (⟨è⟩ /ɛ/ and ⟨ò⟩ /ɔ/ respectively, as in Italian)
- circumflex accent: indicates a stressed short o when otherwise would be unstressed (⟨ô⟩ /u/; the circumflex is not used in Italian)

Pronunciation of vowels and false diphthongs:

- ⟨a⟩, ⟨e⟩, ⟨i⟩ represent open and short vowels when followed by doubled consonants or if accented at the end of a word, and close and long when followed by single consonant.
- ⟨o⟩ represents /u/
- ⟨oeu⟩ represents /œ/
- ⟨u⟩ represents /y/; may also represent /w/ after ⟨q⟩ or in the diphthong ⟨au⟩.

Use of consonants:

- doubling: makes the preceding vowel short and open
- ⟨s⟩ represents either a voiced or voiceless sibilant; intervocalically, it is always voiced, and voiceless /s/ is represented with a double ⟨ss⟩. Word-finally, it is always voiceless.
- ⟨z⟩ represents historical /ts/ or /dz/
- ⟨n⟩ after a vowel and followed by consonant (or word-final) represents the nasalization of the preceding vowel; before another vowel or when written doubled, it represents /n/.
- ⟨m⟩ represents the nasalization of the preceding vowel when followed by consonant or word-final; otherwise it represents /m/.
- ⟨h⟩ represents that the preceding ⟨c⟩ or ⟨g⟩ are velar before a front vowel.
- ⟨sg(i)⟩ represents /ʒ/
- ⟨sc(i)⟩ represents /ʃ/
- ⟨s'c(i)⟩ represents /stʃ/

== Table of pronunciation ==
- The stress is normally on the penultimate syllable for words ending in vowel, on the last syllable for these ending in consonant.

Sign	Context	IPA	Notes
a (à)	unstressed, stressed if followed by double consonant, or accented word-finally	/a/	stress is indicated with grave accent
a (à)	elsewhere	/ɑː/	stress is indicated with grave accent
aa	word-finally	/ɑː/	always stressed
b	always	/b/	devoiced [p] word-finally
c	followed by consonant or by a, o, u	/k/
ci	followed by a, o, u	/tʃ/
c	followed by e, i or word-finally	/tʃ/
ch	followed by e, i or word-finally	/k/
d	always	/d/	devoiced [t] word-finally
e	unstressed	/e/
e (è)	followed by double consonant or accented word-finally	/ɛ/	always stressed; stress is sometimes indicated with grave accent
e (é)	elsewhere	/eː/	always stressed; stress is indicated with acute accent
ee	word-finally	/eː/	always stressed
f	always	/f/
g	followed by consonant or by a, o, u	/ɡ/
gi	followed by a, o, u	/dʒ/
g	followed by e, i or word-finally	/dʒ/	devoiced [tʃ] word-finally
gh	followed by e, i or word-finally	/ɡ/	devoiced [k] word-finally
i (ì)	followed by double consonant or accented word-finally	/i/	stress is indicated with grave accent
i	preceded by consonant and followed by vowel	/j/
i (ì)	elsewhere	/iː/	stress is indicated with grave accent
ii	word-finally	/iː/	always stressed
j	when not preceded by consonant	/j/
l	always	/l/
m	followed by consonant	/◌̃/
m	elsewhere	/m/
n	when it doesn't form a vowel with the preceding vowel or word-finally when last syllable is unstressed	/n/
n	elsewhere	/◌̃/
nn	word-finally	/n/
o	stressed in a non-final open syllable	/uː/
o	elsewhere	/u/
oo	word-finally	/uː/	always stressed
ò	always	/ɔ/	always stressed
ô	word-finally	/u/	always stressed
oeu	followed by double consonant	/œ/ /ø/	always stressed
oeu	elsewhere	/œː/ /øː/	always stressed
p	always	/p/
qu	always followed by a vowel other than u	/kʷ/
r	always	/r/
s	word-finally, followed by voiceless consonant or word-initially	/s/
s	intervocalic or followed by voiced consonant	/z/
sci	followed by a, o, u	/ʃ/
sc	followed by e, i or word-finally	/ʃ/
s'ci	followed by a, o, u	/stʃ/
s'c	followed by e, i	/stʃ/
sgi	followed by a, o, u	/ʒ/
sg	followed by e, i	/ʒ/
ss	between vowels	/s/
t	always	/t/
u (ù)	followed by double consonant or accented word-finally	/y/	stress is indicated with grave accent
u	between q or g and a vowel, or as part of a diphthong	/w/	never stressed
u (ù)	elsewhere	/yː/	stress is indicated with grave accent
uu	word-finally	/yː/	always stressed
v	always	/v/ /ʋ/	devoiced [f] word-finally
z	always	/ts/ /dz/ /s/ /z/	variable; always devoiced [ts]/[s] word-finally
