= Carlo Maria Maggi =

Italian scholar, writer and poet

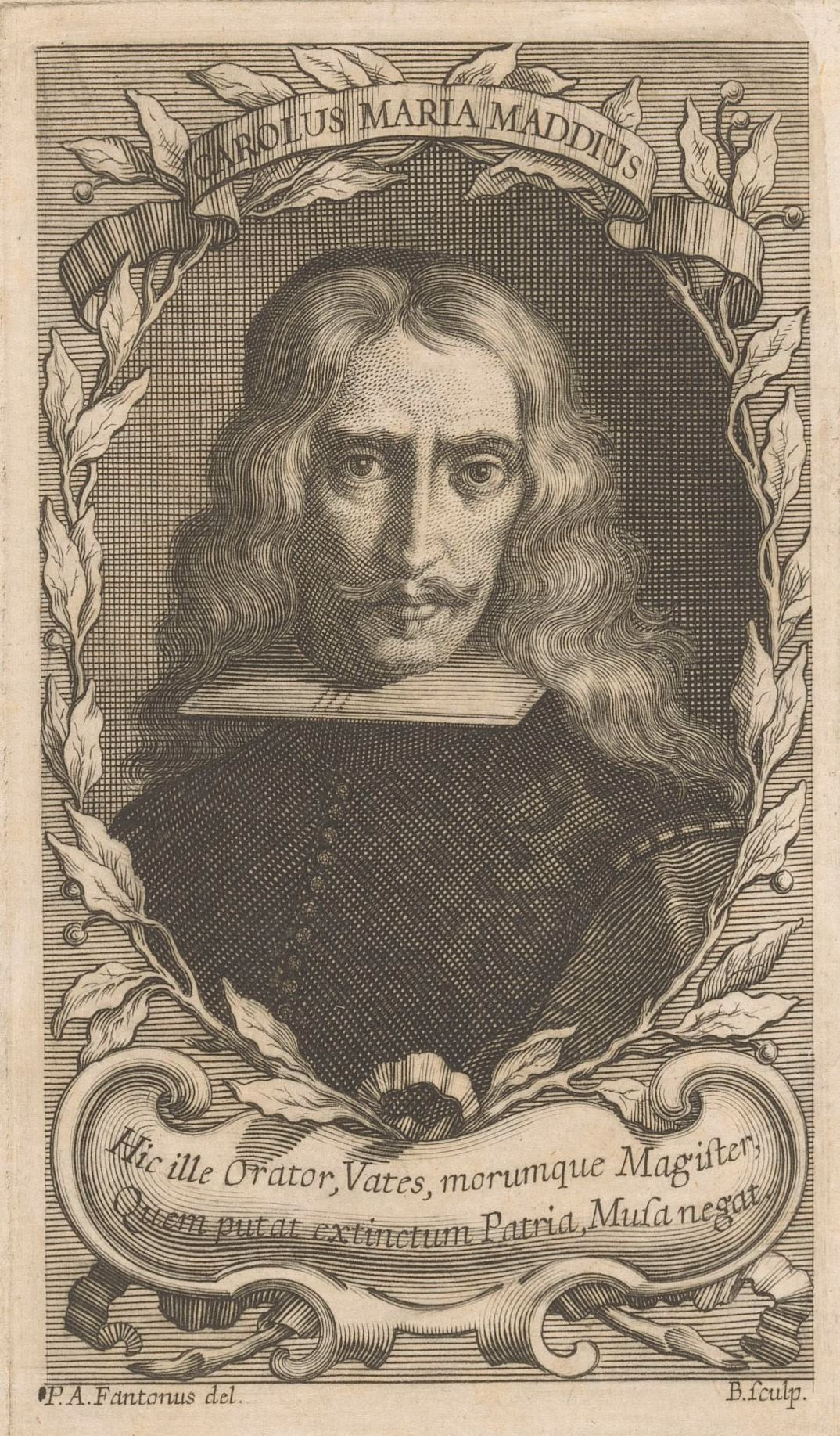
- Engraved portrait of Carlo Maria Maggi (1700)
- Born: 8 May 1630; Milan, Duchy of Milan
- Died: 22 April 1699 (aged 68); Milan, Duchy of Milan
- Resting place: San Nazaro in Brolo
- Education: University of Bologna
- Occupations: Poet; Intellectual; Civil Servant
- Spouse: Anna Maria Monticelli (m. 1656)
- Children: 11
- Parent(s): Giovanni Battista Maggi and Angela Maggi (née Riva)
- Writing career
- Language: Italian; Milanese; Latin; Greek
- Period: 17th century; Baroque
- Genres: Poetry; drama
- Notable work: Concorso de' Meneghini
- Literary movement: Baroque; Neoclassicism

Secretary of the Senate of Milan
- In office 12 July 1666 – 8 November 1674

Signature
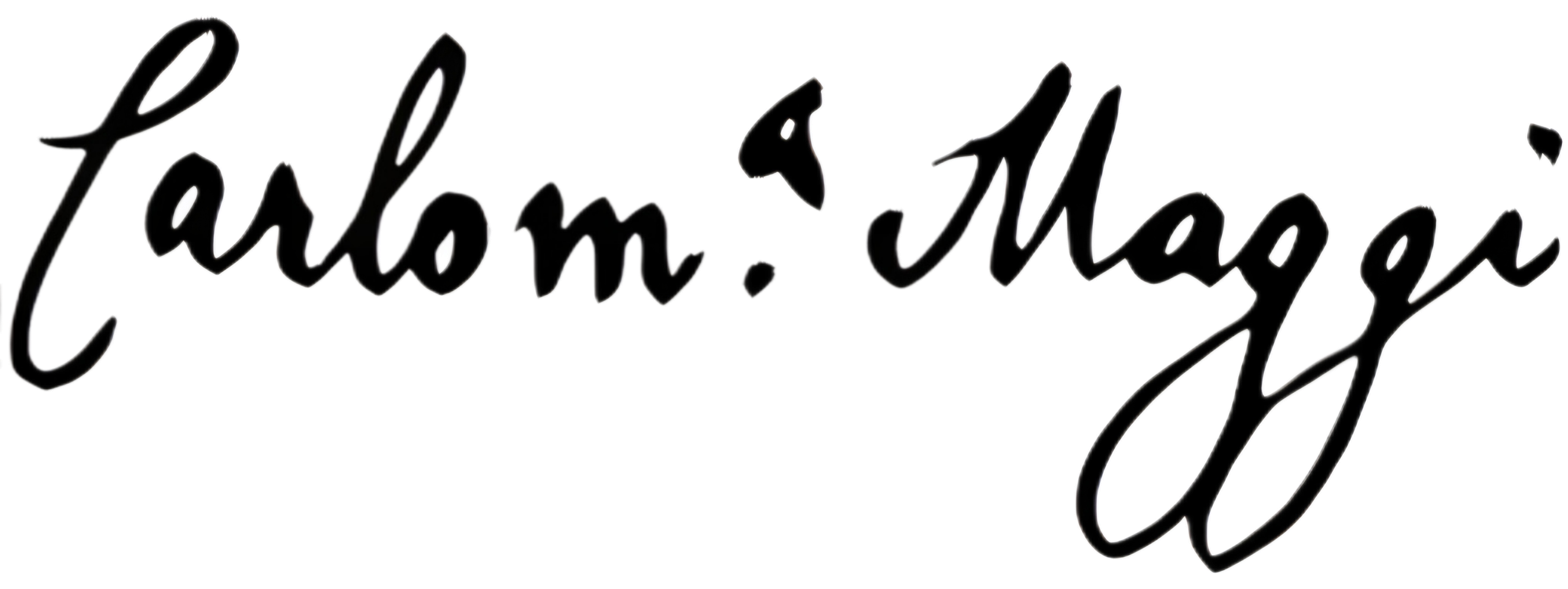

Carlo Maria Maggi (Italian pronunciation: [ˈkarlo maˈriːa ˈmaddʒi]; Milan, 1630 – Milan, 1699) was an Italian scholar, writer and poet. Despite being an Accademia della Crusca affiliate, he gained his fame as an author of "dialectal" works (poems and plays) in Milanese language, for which he is considered the father of Milanese literature. Maggi's work was a major inspiration source for later Milanese scholars such as Carlo Porta and Giuseppe Parini.

== Biography ==
A native of Milan, Carlo Maria Maggi came from a prominent mercantile family, wealthy enough to move in the higher echelons of Milanese society. He studied with the Jesuits at their Brera school in Milan. In 1649 Maggi graduated in law at the University of Bologna.

From 1656, after his marriage (his wife, to whom he was extremely dedicated and who gave birth to 11 children, is the 'Sur Maria' mentioned in some of his poems), he concentrated on his literary studies and poetry writing, and became a member of several of the literary academies populating Italy at the time, including the Crusca in Florence, the Faticosi in Milan, the Arcadia in Rome, the Intronati in Siena and the Olimpici in Vicenza.

Notwithstanding, or possibly because of, his busy literary activities, he was able during these years to cultivate the friendship of some of Milan's outstanding social, political and literary figures, such as Vitaliano Borromeo (of the illustrious family which had produced Archbishops Charles and Federico) and Count Bartolomeo Arese, President of the Senate. The latter would help Maggi obtain the office of Secretary to the Senate, a position he was to hold for 38 years until his death.

Maggi also accepted a professorship of classics at the Palatine Schools in 1664, the same position which Parini was to take over a century later, and capped his academic achievements by becoming superintendent of the University of Pavia. A fine classicist, Maggi displayed his skills in his translations of ancient plays, both Latin (Plautus' Aulularia and Seneca's Troades) and Greek (Iphigenia in Tauris by Euripides).

Maggi was a close friend of Ludovico Antonio Muratori, who edited his Rime Varie in 4 vols. at Milan in 1700. A larger edition was published in 1708 at Venice in 6 vols., entitled Poesie Varie. Maggi had already published a single volume with the title Rime Varie at Turin and Florence in 1688. Finally, there appeared a volume entitled Rime e Prose at Venice in 1719. His comedies, written between 1694 and 1699, were published posthumously in 1701.

== Works ==
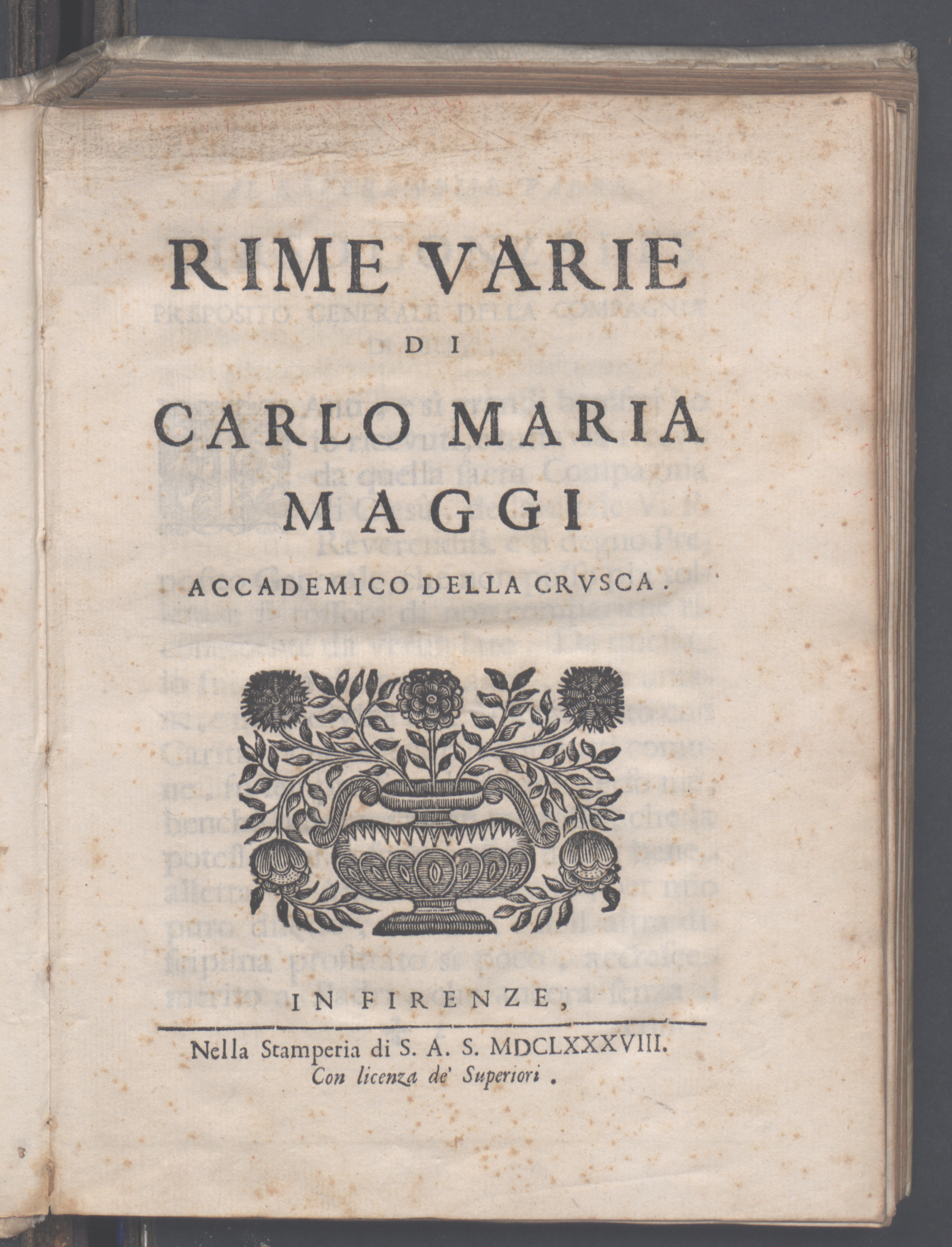
Rime varie, 1688

Although Maggi first gained a reputation as a librettist, most of his librettos were never published, and some were later disowned by the author and destroyed. His prominent works belong to the commedia dell'arte theatrical genre. Some of Maggi's most famous plays in Milanese are Il manco male (1695), Il Barone di Birbanza (1696), I consigli di Meneghino (1697), Il falso filosofo (1698), and Concorso de' Meneghini (1699). This last work may be considered as a sort of manifesto of dialectal poetry, as it explicitly celebrates the virtues of the Milanese language: che apposta la pär fä / par dì la veritä ("which seems as if it was specifically designed to tell the truth"). This equation between the Milanese language (and people) and sincerity is clearly embodied in the commedia character of Meneghino, which is supposedly Maggi's creation, and was later developed by other authors (most notably Carlo Porta) to eventually become a prominent symbol of Milan and the Milanese for antonomasia. Another recurring theme of Milanese literature first established by Maggi's works is the celebration of the verzee (Milan's vegetable market) as the place where the spirit of the city was most genuinely expressed. In Maggi's theatre the servant characters (who speak in dialect) have a monopoly of sententious and proverb-laden wisdom, which, consistent with the author's declared pessimistic moralism, compensates for and neutralizes the caricatured social, economic and cultural corruption of the ruling-class characters.

== Legacy ==
Maggi's work is a landmark in Milanese poetic production. Maggi definitively codifies the writing of Milanese dialect, introducing French oeu, so founding the classical Milanese orthography that will be retouched in the centuries till the present version of Circolo Filologico Milanese. Several Milanese authors paid homage to him. Veneration for Maggi as the forefather of Lombard literature and reworkings of the Meneghino character as the embodiment of the Milanese man of the people run throughout the poetry of Domenico Balestrieri and especially Carlo Porta. A selection of Maggi's poems, translated into English by Mariana Starke, was published in London in 1811.

== Works ==
- Carlo Maria Maggi (1688). Rime varie. In Firenze: nella Stamperia di S.A.S.
- Carlo Maria Maggi, Il Teatro milanese, a cura di D. Isella, I. Testi, traduzioni e note; II. Apparati critici e glossario, Torino, 1964.
- Carlo Maria Maggi (2006). Le rime milanesi. Milan: Garzanti. ISBN 9788811366195.

== Sources ==
- Muratori, Lodovico Antonio (1700). Vita di Carlo Maria Maggi. Milan: Giuseppe Pandolfo Malatesta.
- Mengaldo, Vincenzo (1966). "La «discoverta» del Maggi". Belfagor. 21 (5): 563–592. JSTOR 26141767.
- Palen Pierce, Glenn (1980). "Evidence of transition in the early works of Carlo Maria Maggi: the melodramas". Canadian Journal of Italian Studies. III: 193–222.
- Isella, Dante (1984). I Lombardi in rivolta. Da Carlo Maria Maggi a Carlo Emilio Gadda. Turin: Einaudi. pp. 3–26.
- Carpani, Roberta (1998). Drammaturgia del comico: i libretti per musica di Carlo Maria Maggi nei "theatri di Lombardia". Milan: Vita e Pensiero. ISBN 8834316983.
- Haller, Hermann W. (1999). The Other Italy: The Literary Canon in Dialect. University of Toronto Press. ISBN 0802044247.
- Bufacchi, Emanuela (2006). "MAGGI, Carlo Maria". Dizionario Biografico degli Italiani (in Italian). Vol. 67: Macchi–Malaspina. Rome: Istituto dell'Enciclopedia Italiana. ISBN 978-88-12-00032-6.
