= Pavese dialect =

Western Lombard dialect

Pavese
- Native to: Italy
- Language family: Indo-European: Italic; Latino-Faliscan; Romance; Italo-Western; Western Romance; Gallo-Romance; Gallo-Italic; Lombard–Piedmontese?; Lombard; Western Lombard; Southwestern Lombard; Pavese

Language codes
- ISO 639-3: –
- Glottolog: None

Pavese is a dialect of Western Lombard language spoken in province of Pavia (Lombardy). In Pavese, differently from most of Western Lombard dialects, the "z" (ts or dz) is transformed into "s".

In the past, before the influence of Milanese, Pavese was more similar to Emiliano-Romagnolo language. In Lomellina a Piedmontese-influenced dialect is spoken; in the Oltrepò Pavese fully Western Lombard dialects (like that of Bobbio) or Emilian–Romagnol-influenced dialects (like that of Broni) are spoken; the southern part of the province of Pavia speaks Ligurian-influenced dialects.

Pavese is the language of I Fiö dla Nebia and Quèi Ad La Barcéla, two popular musical groups.

== See also ==
- Itinerario di la Gran Militia, a la Pavese
