= Bosinada =

Poetic genre in Lombard language

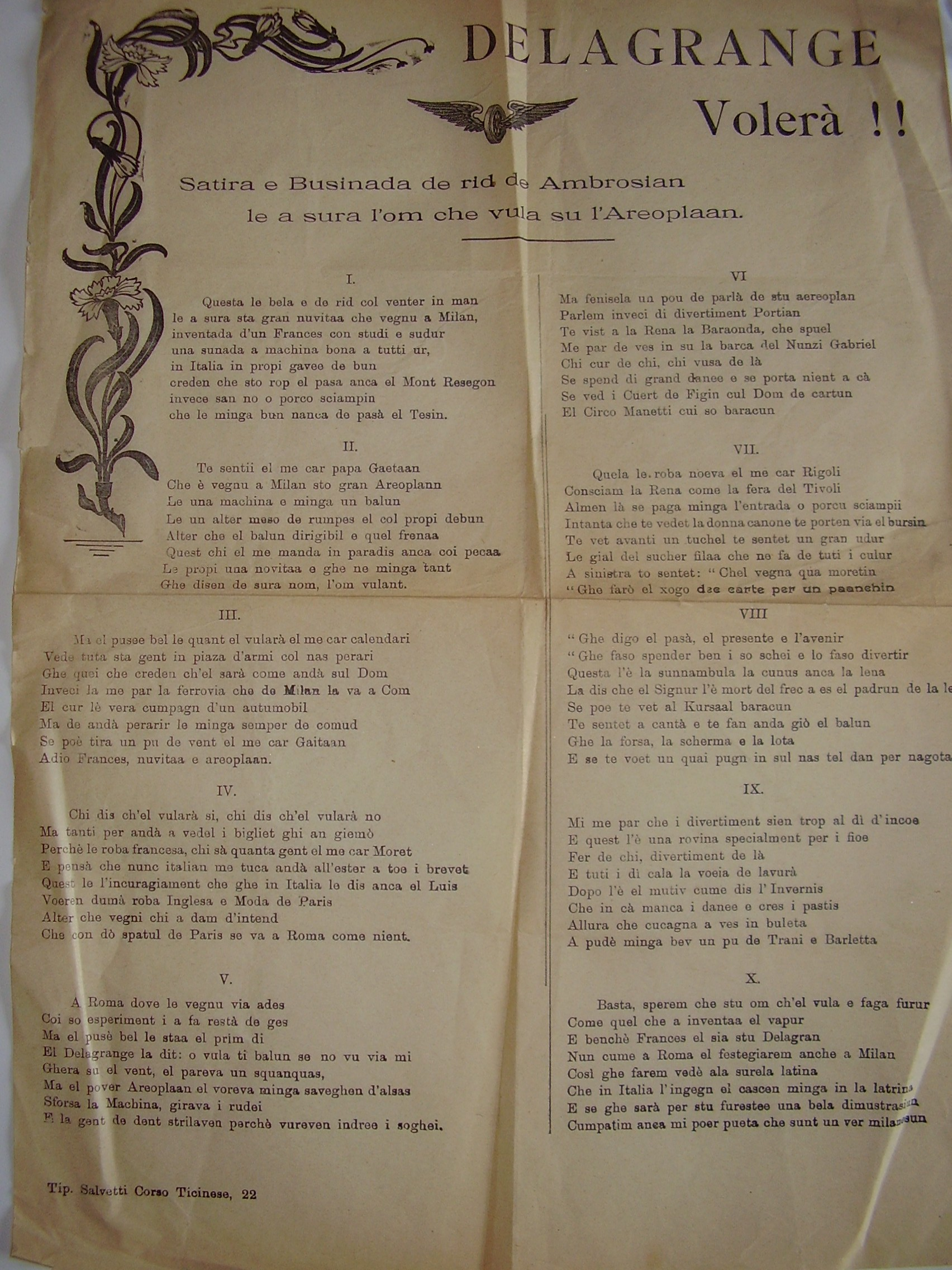
Delagrange volerà!, anonymous bosinada from the early 20th century

The bosinada (IPA: [buziˈnaːda]) or bosinata (pl. bosinade, bosinad, or bosinate) was a traditional, popular poetic genre in Lombard language that began in the 18th century or earlier and reached its apex in the late 19th century. Bosinate were usually written or printed on sheets of paper and recited by a sort of cantastorie or minstrel called a bosin (IPA: [buˈzĩː]; pl. bosit or bositt, IPA: [buˈzit]); (Note: The Italian suffix -ata, or -ada in Lombard, refers to something typical of the person the suffix is attached to; e.g., a bambinata (from bambino, "child") is "a childish act". Likewise, bosinada would mean "a bosin's thing".) they were usually satirical in content, sometimes explicitly designed to hold someone up to ridicule, or to debunk certain social habits or circumstances; in any case, they were the expression of the naive but sound good sense of the common people.

== Etymology ==
Most scholars agree that the word "bosin" comes from Ambrœx (Lombard for Ambrose), as Ambrose was a prominent symbol of Milan. Other explanations of the term nevertheless exist. In Milanese dialect, a bosin is also someone who comes from Brianza, and G. Crespi reports that the terms is also used more specifically to refer to that part of the Milanese countryside that lies between the Ticino river, the Lambro river, and the mountains of Varese, and that it directly derives from the name of the Bozzente creek, which was known as Bosintio in the past. These etymologies would thus establish a connection between the bosinata and the rural areas surrounding of Milan, which might make sense as the bosinate were conceived as a coarse, uneducated form of poetry that the Milanese might associate with the vulgar people of the contado. More specifically, scholar Bernardino Biondelli suggests that the first bosin were actually from Milan, but that they deliberately adopted a language inspired by that spoken in the rural areas outside Milan, to emphasize the naive character of their compositions.

== History ==
The oldest known bosinade date back to the early 18th century, but scholars (for example C. Repossi) tend to believe that the tradition might have begun much earlier, possibly in the 16th century. Only from the 18th century, in fact, bosinate were printed, which makes it possible to determine their age through an analysis of their typographical characteristics. Some of the earliest printed bosinate were composed by Gaspare Fumagalli around 1723. Collections of early bosinate were edited, among others, by Francesco Cherubini and Ferdinando Fontana.

In the 19th century the bosinada was so popular that even major Milanese dialectal poets such as Carlo Porta would occasionally refer to themselves as bosits, possibly as a statement of modesty. Bosinade also make occasional appearances in the plots of the stories and poems from these authors; in La Ninetta del Verzee ("Ninetta of the Verziere") by Porta, for example, the main character Ninetta hires a bosin to write a composition on her lover, who mistreats and exploits her, to hold him up to ridicule as a form of revenge.

Bosinate continued until the early 20th century. Some of the last known bosinade include La Balonada by Gaetano Crespi (1907), about a hot air balloon race, or Delagrange volerà! ("Delagrange will fly") on the flight experiments by Léon Delagrange.

== Structure ==
The bosinata did not have a fixed or codified structure. The meter itself was not fixed, and sometimes different meters were used in the same poem; in fact, irregular verses were quite common, as this reflects the popular and coarse nature of bosinade. Ottonari (octameters) and endecasillabi (hendecasyllables) were the most recurring meters. Verses usually came in rhyming couplets.

== Sources ==
- Bernardino Biondelli (1853), Saggio sui dialetti gallo-ítalici.
- Francesco Cherubini (1816), Collezione delle migliori opere scritte in dialetto milanese, Pirotta, Milan
- Gaetano Crespi (1907), La balonada. Satira giornalistica in sestine milanesi di G.C., Libreria Renato Baggio, Milan
- Ferdinando Fontana (1901), Antologia Meneghina, E. Colombi, Bellizona
- Cesare Repossi (1985), "Bibliografia delle Bosinate in dialetto milanese (1650-1848)", in: F. Della Peruta, R. Leydi, A. Stella, eds., Milano e il suo territorio, Silvana ed., Milan

== See also ==
- Western Lombard literature
