= Bustocco and Legnanese dialects =

Western Lombard dialects of Italy

Bustocco and Legnanese
- büstócu legnanés
- Pronunciation: [byˈstoku] [leɲaˈneːs]
- Native to: Italy
- Language family: Indo-European: Italic; Latino-Faliscan; Romance; Italo-Western; Western Romance; Gallo-Romance; Gallo-Italic; Lombard–Piedmontese?; Lombard; Western Lombard; Bustocco and Legnanese

Language codes
- ISO 639-3: –
- Glottolog: None

Bustocco and Legnanese (natively büstócu and legnanés) are two dialects of Western Lombard, spoken respectively in the cities of Busto Arsizio (Province of Varese) and Legnano (Province of Milan), Lombardy.

Although there is little evidence of Ligurian settlements in the area, they are widely thought to have been characterised by the Ligurian substratum. While Legnanese is closer to the Milanese dialect, Bustocco is especially considered very similar to the modern Ligurian language, for example for the frequent unstressed [u] at the end of masculine nouns and other words is more frequent (e.g. Bustocco gatu "cat", secu "dry", coldu "hot", bücéu "glass", candu "when" = Legnanese gatt, secch, cald, bicér, quand), as well as the elimination of some intervocalic consonants (e.g. Bustocco lauà "to work" = Legnanese lavurà). In both dialects stressed /a/ sounds like a mix between a and o.

A comic theatrical group called I Legnanesi uses Legnanese (with simplified grammar and lexicon heavily based on Italian) in its shows.
