= Delio Tessa =

Italian poet (1886–1939)

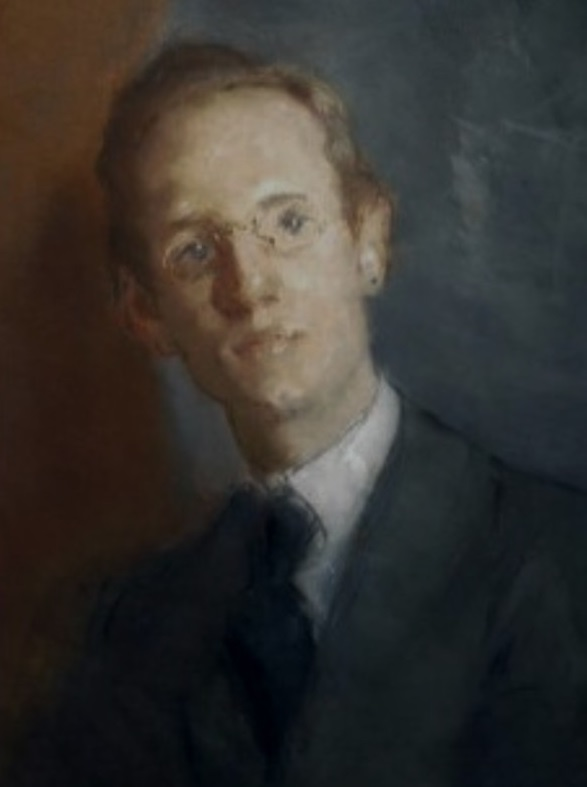
Delio Tessa, Viale Beatrice d'Este, Milano.jpg

Delio Tessa (18 November 1886 – 21 September 1939) was an Italian poet from Milan who wrote dialect poetry.

== Biography ==
He studied at the High school Beccaria in Milan and graduated as a lawyer in the University of Pavia. After University studies he did not like the job of conciliator judge.

He dedicated the free times deepening Milanese dialect literature as: Carlo Porta, and started to write some comedies and film scripts like: Vecchia Europa, postume published on 1986. He was part of the second generation of Lombard line.

An antifascist, he remained aloof from official culture, devoting himself to local sphere. Except the collection of poems L'è el dì di mort, alegher!, all his works have been published posthumously.

Tessa died in 1939 of abscess, and was buried, according to his will, in a common field of Musocco. However, in 1950 Milan City Council transferred his body to the city's Monumental Cemetery, where other eminent Milanese people lie.

== Poetry and thought ==
He was the most renowned writer in the Milanese dialect after Carlo Porta. The originality of his poetry stands mostly in his expressionism and his satirical (both sad and ironical) way to depict Death.

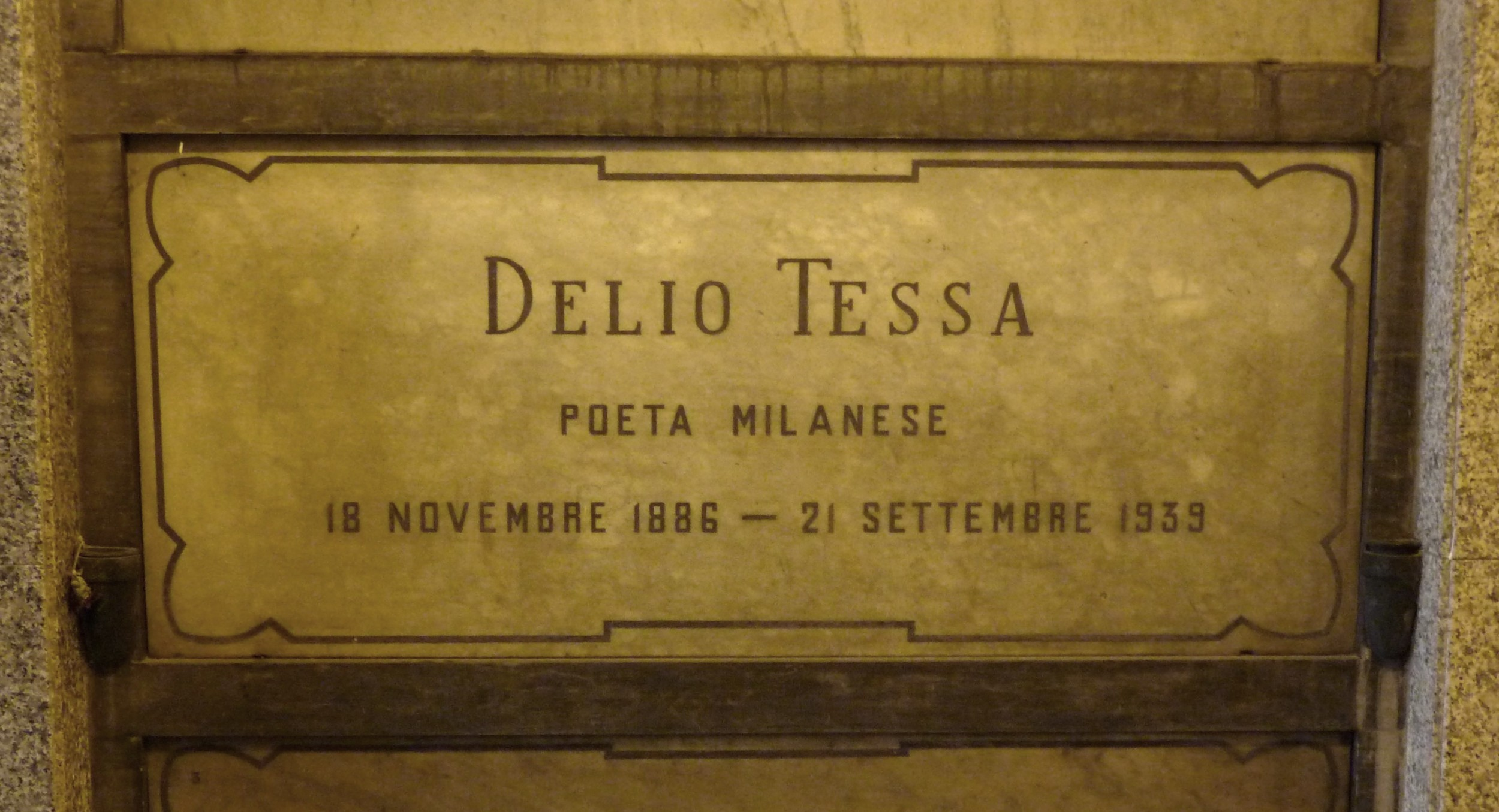
Tessa's grave at the Monumental Cemetery of Milan, Italy

The topics of his poetics are the drama of the World War I and of the daily life of neglects, revised in personal way and caring very much about the sonority of the lines.

Often the topic of the dead women is present, with a pessimism and distrust of personal and cultural origin (Scapigliatura, decadentism, Russian novel, expressionism).

The restlessness is reflected in the tension of the language, used like strongly fragmented popular language.

== Works and styles ==
His masterpiece is L'è el dì di Mort, alegher! ("It's the day of the Dead, be happy!", a collection of his lyrics, 1932).

Stylistically, he uses massively "enjambements" and parentheticals; he mixes Milanese dialect (a dialect of Western Lombard language spoken in the city and in the Hinterland) with Italian and foreign languages such as French and English, making them rhyme, too.

The themes of the First World War faced up by Tessa appeared in the settenary poem: Caporetto 1917; dedicated to the Battle of Caporetto.
