= Itinerario di la Gran Militia, a la Pavese =

Historical account

Start of the main text

The Itinerario di la Gran Militia, a la Pavese ("Itinerary of the Great Army, in Pavese") is an anonymous late medieval account of the First Crusade written in the dialect of Pavia. It relies almost entirely on William of Tyre as its source. It cannot be determined if its author relied on the Latin text of William's History or on its Old French translation, which was available in the Biblioteca visconteo in Pavia. Most of its unique material is legendary, relates to Lombardy and seeks to glorify the Visconti. It lists several supposed crusaders from Lombardy, including Ottone Visconti, without, however, citing any source. The surviving work is the first of three projected books, the latter two of which were probably never written. It ends with the Siege of Nicaea in 1097. The other two books were to complete the crusade and describe the geography of the East. It contains a table of contents, a prologue and an epilogue.

The Itinerario has been dated to the 14th or 15th century. Antonio Musarra associates it with the renewed interest in the crusade during the papacy of Pius II (1458–1464). It is preserved in a single parchment manuscript copied in Milan, now Biblioteca Nazionale Braidense, AC.VIII.34. The text takes up 22 leaves and is the only text in the slim volume, which is probably a presentation copy intended for a Visconti patron, like Filippo Maria Visconti (r. 1412–1447). It is copied in a neat "semi-Gothic book hand" and well decorated. The biscione (the snake symbol of the Visconti) appears repeatedly in marginalia and inhabited initials. The illumination is of the International Gothic style and closely related to the work of Franco and Filippolo de Veris and Michelino da Besozzo.

The manuscript does not appear in any of the Visconti catalogues or inventories. It was rebound in green morocco in the 19th century. An edition with a translation into French was published in 1895.

== Editions ==
- Paul Riant, ed. and trans. "Itinerario di la Gran Militia, a la Pavese". Recueil des Historiens des Croisades, Historiens Occidentaux, Volume 5, XIII (Paris: Imprimerie Nationale, 1895), 649–89.
