= Lombard literature =

Lombard literature is literature in the Lombard language. The term "Lombard literature" may sometimes refer to the literature of Lombardy in any language. In the latter sense Stephen McCormick uses it to refer to the Franco-Italian literature of the late Middle Ages.

Lombard literature was patronized by Duke Filippo Maria Visconti of Milan. In 1427, the ducal chancery switched to Lombard. Court writers were encouraged to write in Lombard or to translate works for the ducal library. Classical texts translated into Lombard for Visconti include the Lives of the Caesars and the Historia Augusta before 1431, possibly by Antonio da Rho, and Pier Candido Decembrio's 1438 translations of The Gallic War, the Histories of Alexander the Great and Polybius' On the Punic War.

Early authors in the Old Lombard language include:

- Francesco di Vanozzo
- Gherardo Patecchio
- Giacomino da Verona
- Guido Faba
- Pier Candido Decembrio
- Pietro da Barsegapè
- Uguccione da Lodi
- Vivaldo Belcazer

For authors in the Milanese dialect specifically, see List of Milanese dialect writers.

Early works written in Lombard include:

- Itinerario di la Gran Militia, in the Pavese dialect
- Lamento di Bernabò Visconti, in a Tuscanized vernacular
- Leggenda di San Bassiano, in the Lodigiano dialect
