= Meneghino =

Traditional character

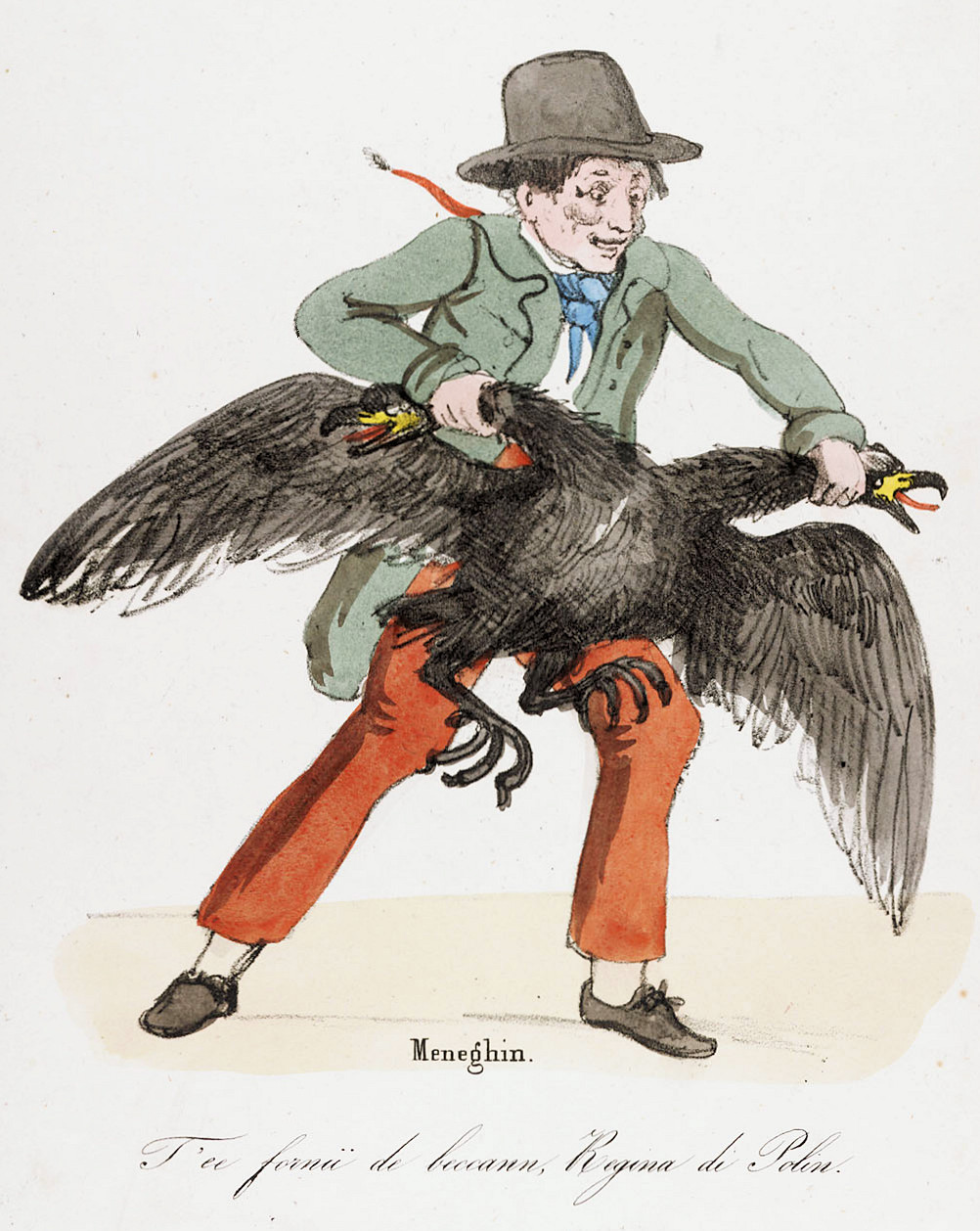
Satirical print after the Five Days of Milan: Meneghino pulls the necks of the Habsburg double-headed eagle, exclaiming, "You're done pecking at us, queen of the turkeys."

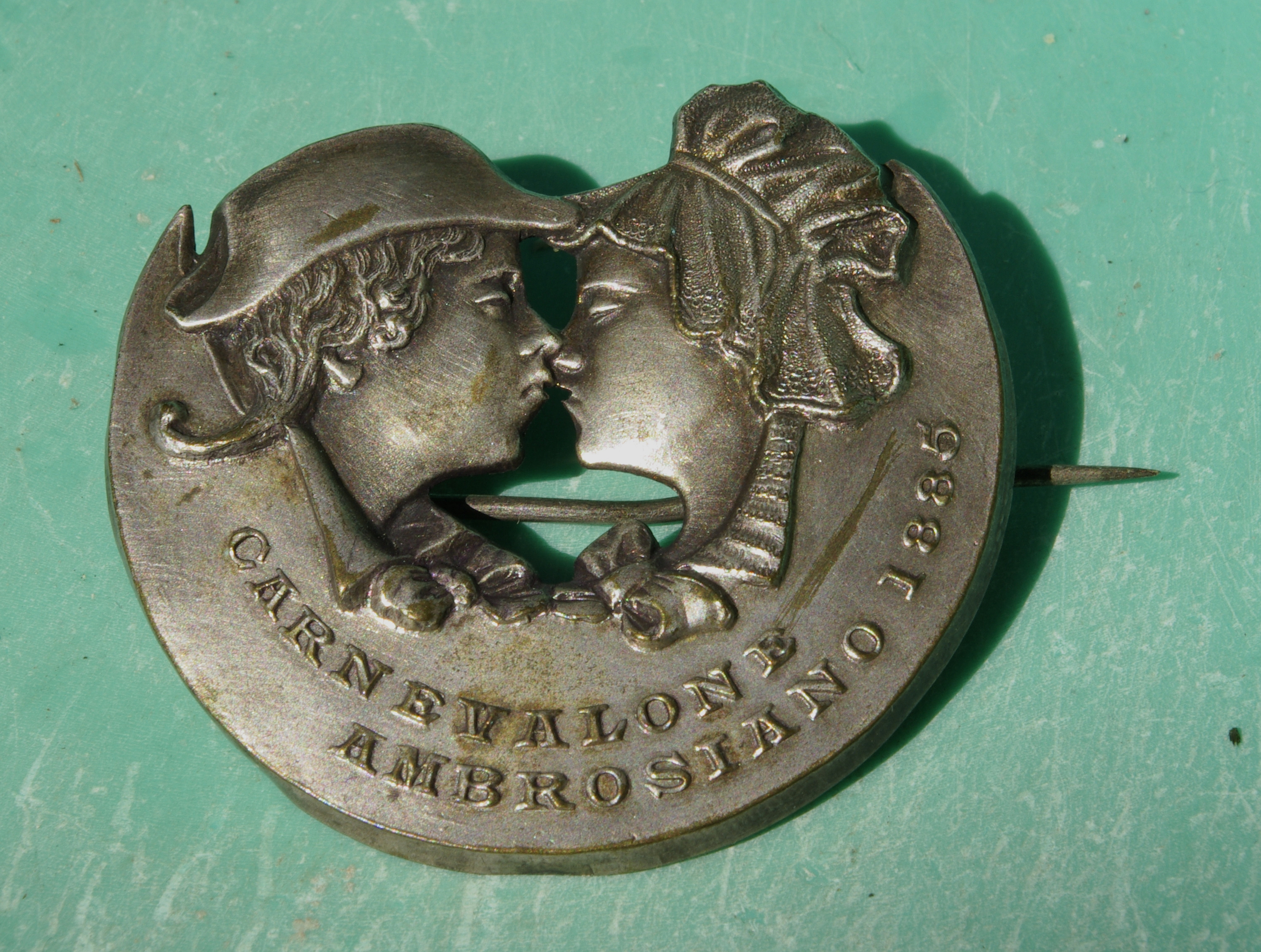
Meneghino and Cecca, pin from the Carnevale Ambrosiano of 1885

Meneghino (Italian pronunciation: [meneˈɡiːno]; Milanese: Meneghin [meneˈɡĩː]) is a traditional character of the Italian commedia dell'arte, associated to the city of Milan. As such, it also plays a major role in the Milanese celebrations of Carnival (Carnevale Ambrosiano) and in local marionette traditional shows.

It is uncertain whether his name is just a diminutive form of Domenico or a reference to the domenighini, a word used in Milan to refer to the servants that accompanied the faithful to masses on Sundays (domenica in Italian and domenega in Milanese). Meneghino is in fact a witty servant (and thus a variation on the theme of the Zanni character), but he is mostly characterized by honesty, sincerity and a strong sense of justice. He is usually represented as wearing a cocked three-cornered hat, a pony-tailed wig, short green pants, red-white striped stockings, black shoes with buckles, a white shirt, a yellow or otherwise colorful flowered vest, a long jacket, and an umbrella. Meneghino's sincerity is also symbolized by the fact that, unlike most commedia dell'arte characters, he doesn't wear a mask. While originally a servant, Meneghino has actually taken on different roles on stages, including that of the master, the peasant, and the merchant. In Carnival parades, he is often accompanied by his wife Cecca (Milanese diminutive of Francesca).

The character was first popularized (and possibly created) by Milanese writer Carlo Maria Maggi, who also gave him the surname Pecenna, a Milanese word which means "hairdresser" (from peccen "comb") but also conveys an implicit critique to the vanity and shallowness of aristocracy and clergy. The character was further developed by Milanese poet Carlo Porta, who used it in several works, including his debut El lavapiatt del Meneghin ch'è mort ("The dead Meneghino's dish-washer", 1792). Porta also developed the anti-clerical traits of the character in works such as Meneghin biroeu di ex monegh ("Meneghino Servant of the Former Nuns", 1820). Meneghino thus eventually became the embodiment of the Milanese's critical attitude towards the powerful, the rich, and the oppressors of the people. As a consequence, in the years that led to the Italian unification (i.e., during the Risorgimento), he became a symbol of the Milanese revolutionary movement against the Austrian oppression.

== See also ==
- Symbols of Milan
