= Lombard language =

Gallo-Italic language spoken in the Italian region of Lombardy

Lombard
- lombard, lumbard, lumbart, lombart
- Native to: Italy; Switzerland
- Region: Italy: Lombardy; Piedmont; South Tyrol; Trentino; Switzerland: Grisons; Ticino; Brazil: Santa Catarina
- Native speakers: 3.8 million (2002)
- Language family: Indo-European: Italic; Latino-Faliscan; Latin; Romance; Italo-Western; Western Romance; Gallo-Iberian; Gallo-Romance; Gallo-Italic; Lombard–Piedmontese?; Lombard
- Early forms: Old Latin: Vulgar Latin; Proto-Romance; Old Gallo-Italic; Old Lombard
- Dialects: Western Lombard; Eastern Lombard
- Writing system: Latin

Language codes
- ISO 639-3: lmo
- Glottolog: lomb1257
- Linguasphere: 51-AAA-oc
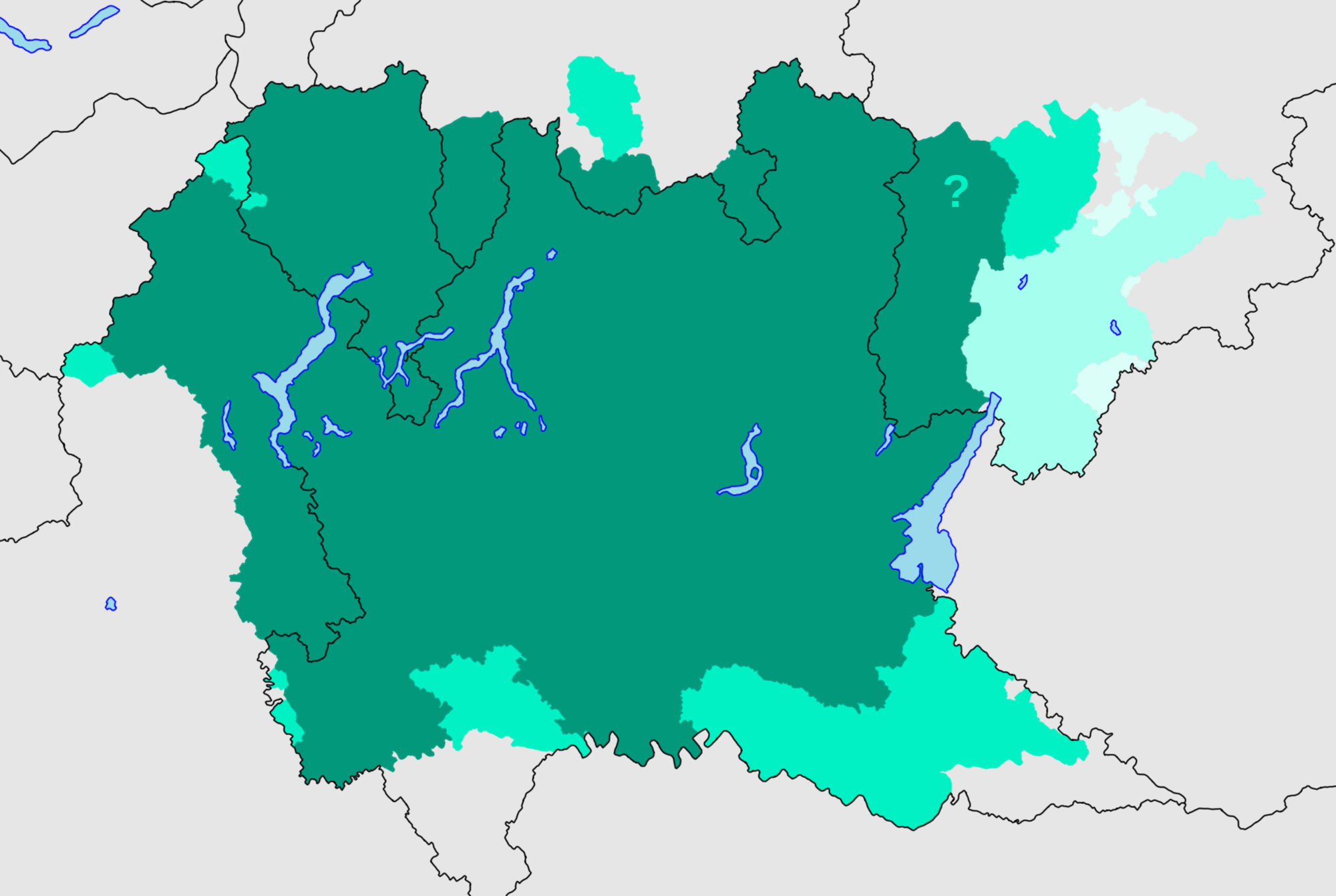
- Lombard language distribution in northern Italy and Switzerland: Areas where Lombard is spoken Areas where Lombard is spoken alongside other languages (Alemannic, Ladin and Romansh) and areas of linguistic transition (with Piedmontese, with Emilian and with Venetian) Areas of influence of Lombard (Tridentine dialect) ? Areas of uncertain diffusion of Ladin

The Lombard language (Lombard: lombard, (Note: Classical Milanese orthography, Scriver Lombard and New Lombard Orthography.) lumbard, (Note: Ticinese orthography.) lumbart (Note: Modern Western orthography and Classical Cremish Orthography.) or lombart, (Note: Eastern unified orthography.) depending on the orthography; pronunciation: [lumˈbaːrt, lomˈbart]) belongs to the Gallo-Italic group within the Romance languages. It is characterized by a Celtic linguistic substratum and a Lombardic linguistic superstratum and is a cluster of homogeneous dialects that are spoken by millions of speakers in Northern Italy and southern Switzerland. These include most of Lombardy and some areas of the neighbouring regions, notably the far eastern side of Piedmont and the extreme western side of Trentino, and in Switzerland in the cantons of Ticino and Graubünden. The language is also spoken in Santa Catarina in Brazil by Lombard immigrants from the Province of Bergamo, in Italy.

== History ==
=== Origins ===
The most ancient linguistic substratum that has left a mark on the Lombard language is that of the ancient Ligures. However, available information about the ancient language and its influence on modern Lombard is extremely vague and limited. That is in sharp contrast to the influence left by the Celts, who settled in Northern Italy and brought their Celtic languages and culturally and linguistically Celticised the Ligures. The Celtic substratum of modern Lombard and the neighbouring languages of Northern Italy is self-evident and so the Lombard language is classified as a Gallo-Italic language (from the ancient Roman name for the Celts, Galli).

Roman domination shaped the dialects spoken in the area, which is called Cisalpine Gaul ("Gaul, this side of the mountains") by the Romans, and much of the lexicon and grammar of the Lombard language have their origin in Latin. However, that influence was not homogeneous since idioms of different areas were influenced by previous linguistic substrata, and each area was marked by a stronger or weaker Latinisation or the preservation of ancient Celtic characteristics.

The Germanic Lombardic language also left strong traces in modern Lombard, as it was the variety of Germanic that was spoken by the Germanic Lombards (or Longobards), who settled in Northern Italy, which is called Greater Lombardy after them, and in other parts of the Italian Peninsula after the fall of the Western Roman Empire. Lombardic acted as a linguistic superstratum on Lombard and neighboring Gallo-Italic languages since the Germanic Lombards did not impose their language by law on the Gallo-Roman population, but they rather acquired the Gallo-Italic language from the local population. Lombardic left traces, mostly in lexicon and phonetics, without Germanicising the local language in its structure and so Lombard preserved its Romance structure.

=== From the 15th to the 17th century ===
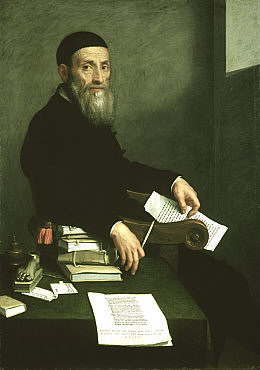
Giovanni Bressani, author of satirical poems in the Bergamo dialect

From the 15th century onwards, literary Tuscan began to supplant the use of northern vernaculars such as Lombard, even regardless of the fact that Lombard itself began to be heavily influenced by the Tuscan vernacular. Prior to that, the Lombard language was widely used in administrative spheres. Among those who favoured the strengthening of Tuscan influences over Lombard culture was the Duke of Milan Ludovico il Moro; during his reign he brought numerous men of culture from the Republic of Florence to the Sforza court, the most famous of whom was certainly Leonardo da Vinci. At the same time, however, Lancino Curzio still wrote some works in Milanese dialect at the Sforza court.

Between the 15th and 16th centuries, the Lombard language was widely and actively discredited in Italian literary circles. Tuscan writers and humanists such as Luigi Pulci and Benedetto Dei recorded aspects of the language spoken in Milan in the form of parodies; similarly, the Asti-born writer Giorgio Alione parodied Milanese in his Commedia e farse carnovalesche nei dialetti astigiano, milanese e francese misti con latino barbaro (eng. "Comedy and carnival farces in the Asti, Milanese and French dialects mixed with barbaric Latin") composed at the end of the 15th century. The Florentine humanist Leonardo Salviati, one of the founders of the Accademia della Crusca, an important Italian linguistic academy operating to this day, published a series of translations of a Boccaccian tale into various vernaculars (including Bergamo and Milanese) explicitly in order to demonstrate how ugly and awkward they were compared to Tuscan.

At the same time, the 15th century saw the first signs of a true Lombard literature: in the eastern parts of Lombardy, the Bergamo-born Giovanni Bressani composed numerous volumes of satirical poetry and the Brescia-born Galeazzo dagli Orzi wrote his Massera da bé, a sort of theatrical dialogue; in the west of the region area, the Mannerist painter Giovanni Paolo Lomazzo lead the composition of the "arabesques" in the Accademia dei Facchini della Val di Blenio, a Milanese academy founded in 1560.

At the beginning of the 17th century, the Ossola native Giovanni Capis published the Varon milanes de la lengua de Milan (eng. "Varrone Milanese on the language of Milan"), a sort of etymological dictionary was published.

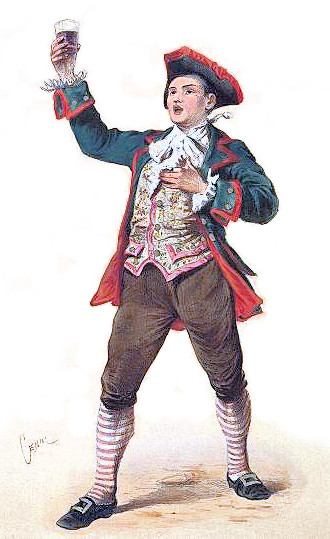
Meneghino, a character from the Milanese theatre, who later became a mask of the commedia dell'arte

An example of a text in ancient Milanese dialect is this excerpt from Il falso filosofo (1698), act III, scene XIV, where Meneghino, a traditional Milanese character from the commedia dell'arte, presents himself in court (Lombard on the left, Italian translation on the right):

«E mì interrogatus ghe responditt.
Sont Meneghin Tandœuggia,
Ciamæ par sora nomm el Tananan,
Del condamm Marchionn ditt el Sginsgiva;
Sont servitor del sior Pomponi Gonz,
C'al è trent agn che'l servj»

E io interrogatus risposi:
Sono Meneghino Babbeo
chiamato per soprannome il Ciampichino
del fu Marchionne detto il Gengiva;
sono servitore del signor Pomponio Gonzo
che servo da trent'anni

— Meneghino appears in court in "The False Philosopher" (1698), act III, scene XIV

The 17th century also saw the rise of the figure of the playwright Carlo Maria Maggi, who normalised the spelling of the Milanese dialect and who created, among other things, the Milanese mask of Meneghino. A friend and correspondent of Maggi was Francesco De Lemene, author of La sposa Francesca (the first literary work in modern Lodi dialect) and of a translation of Gerusalemme liberata. Moreover, the 17th century saw the emergence of the first bosinade: popular poems written on loose sheets and posted in the squares or read (or even sung) in public; they were widely diffused until the first decades of the 20th century.

=== In the modern era ===
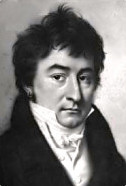
Carlo Porta, the most important author of Lombard literature, also included among the greatest poets of Italian national literature

Milanese literature in the 18th century was quickly developing: some important names which emerged in that period include Domenico Balestrieri, who was associated the famous poet Giuseppe Parini. The latter wrote some compositions in the Lombard language. One of the most important writers of the period was the Bergamo-based abbot Giuseppe Rota, author of a substantial (unpublished) Bergamo-Italian-Latin vocabulary and of several poetic works in the Orobic idiom, which he always called "lingua".

In this period the linguistic characteristics of Lombard were well recognizable and comparable to the modern ones, except for some phonetic peculiarities and the presence of a remote past tense, replaced almost fully by the past perfect tense by 1875.

The beginning of the 19th century was dominated by the figure of Carlo Porta, recognized by many as the most important author of Lombard literature, also included among the greatest poets of Italian national literature. With him some of the highest peaks of expressiveness in the Lombard language were reached, which clearly emerged in works such as La Ninetta del Verzee, Desgrazzi de Giovannin Bongee, La guerra di pret and Lament del Marchionn de gamb avert.

Milanese poetic production assumed such important dimensions that in 1815 the scholar Francesco Cherubini published an anthology of Lombard literature in four volumes, which included texts written from the seventeenth century to his day.

=== In the contemporary era ===
In the first part of the 20th century, the greatest exponent of Lombard literature was the Milanese lawyer Delio Tessa, who distanced himself from the Portian tradition by giving his texts a strong expressionist tone. In Bergamo, the most prominent advocate of Lombard language was Bortolo Belotti, a lawyer, historian and minister in the liberal governments of the time.

The Lombard language became known outside its linguistic borders thanks to I Legnanesi, a theatre company that performed comedies in the Legnanese dialect and which is the most famous example of travesti theatre in Italy. In their comic shows the actors propose to the public satirical figures of the typical Lombard court; founded in Legnano in 1949 by Felice Musazzi, Tony Barlocco and Luigi Cavalleri, it is among the most famous companies in the European dialect theatre scene.

The 21st century has also seen the use of Lombard in contemporary music, such as in the musical pieces of Davide Van De Sfroos and in the translations into Lombard of the works of Bob Dylan. There is no shortage of translations of great literary classics; in fact, there are numerous versions in Lombard of works such as Pinocchio, The Betrothed, The Little Prince, the Divine Comedy and – in religious literature – of the Gospels.

== Status ==
Lombard is considered a minority language that is structurally separate from Italian by both Ethnologue and the UNESCO Red Book on Endangered Languages. However, Italy and Switzerland do not recognize Lombard-speakers as a linguistic minority. In Italy, that is the same as for most other minority languages, which have been for a long time incorrectly classed as corrupted regional dialects of Italian. However, Lombard and Italian belong to different subgroups of the Romance language family, and Lombard's historical development is not related to Standard Italian, which is derived from Tuscan.

=== Speakers ===
A Lombard speaker

Historically, the vast majority of Lombards spoke only Lombard, as "Italian" was merely a literary language, and most Italians were not able to read or write. After the Italian economic miracle, Standard Italian arose throughout Italy and Lombard-speaking Switzerland, wholly-monolingual Lombard-speakers became a rarity as time went by, but a small minority may still be uncomfortable speaking Standard Italian. Surveys in Italy find that all Lombard-speakers also speak Italian, and their command of both two languages varies according to their geographical position as well as their socio-economic situation. The most reliable predictor was found to be the speaker's age. Studies have found that young people are much less likely to speak Lombard as proficiently as their grandparents. In some areas, elderly people are more used to speaking Lombard than Italian even though they know both.

== Classification ==
Chart of Romance languages based on structural and comparative criteria

Lombard belongs to the Gallo-Italic (Cisalpine) group of Gallo-Romance languages, which belongs to the Western Romance subdivision.

=== Varieties ===
Traditionally, the Lombard dialects have been classified into the Eastern, Western, Alpine and Southern Lombard dialects.

The varieties of the Italian provinces of Milan, Varese, Como, Lecco, Lodi, Monza and Brianza, Pavia and Mantua belong to Western Lombard, and the provinces of Bergamo, Brescia and Cremona are dialects of Eastern Lombard. All varieties spoken in the Swiss areas (both in the Canton of Ticino and the Canton of Graubünden) are Western, and both Western and Eastern varieties are found in the Italian areas.

The varieties of the Alpine valleys of Valchiavenna and Valtellina (Sondrio) and upper-Valcamonica (Brescia) and the four Lombard valleys of the Swiss canton of Graubünden have some peculiarities of their own and some traits in common with Eastern Lombard but should be considered Western. Also, dialects from the Piedmontese provinces of Verbano-Cusio-Ossola and Novara, the Valsesia valley (province of Vercelli), and the city of Tortona are closer to Western Lombard than to Piedmontese. Alternatively, following the traditional classification, the varieties spoken in parts of Sondrio, Trentino, Ticino and Grigioni can be considered as Alpine Lombard, and those spoken in southern Lombardy such as in Pavia, Lodi, Cremona and Mantova can be classified as Southern Lombard.

== Literature ==
Lacking a standard language, authors in the 13th and 14th language created Franco-Lombard, a mixed language including Old French, for their literary works. The Lombard variety with the oldest literary tradition (from the 13th century) is that of Milan, but Milanese, the native Lombard variety of the area, has now almost completely been superseded by Italian from the heavy influx of migrants from other parts of Italy (especially from Apulia, Sicily and Campania) during the rapid industrialization after the Second World War.

Ticinese is a comprehensive denomination for the Lombard varieties that are spoken in Swiss canton Ticino (Tessin), and the Ticinese koiné is the Western Lombard koiné used by speakers of local dialects (particularly those diverging from the koiné itself) when they communicate with speakers of other Lombard dialects of Ticino, Grigioni or Italian Lombardy. The koiné is similar to Milanese and the varieties of the neighbouring provinces on the Italian side of the border.

There is extant literature in other varieties of Lombard like La masséra da bé, a theatrical work in early Eastern Lombard, written by Galeazzo dagli Orzi (1492–?) presumably in 1554.

== Usage ==
Detailed geographic distribution of Lombard dialects Legend: L01 – Western Lombard; L02 – Eastern Lombard; L03 – Southern Lombard; L04 – Alpine Lombard

Standard Italian is widely used in Lombard-speaking areas. However, the status of Lombard is quite different in the Swiss and Italian areas and so the Swiss areas have now become the real strongholds of Lombard.

=== In Switzerland ===
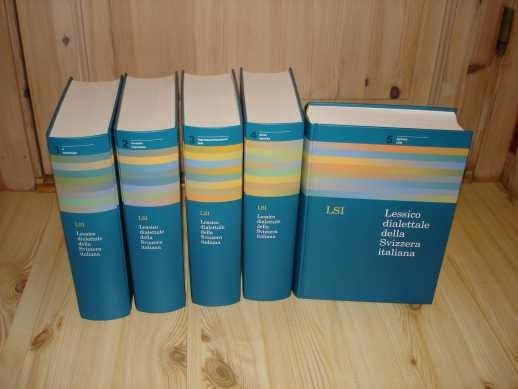
The LSI, published in 2004

In the Swiss areas, the local Lombard varieties are generally better preserved and more vital than in Italy. No negative feelings are associated with the use of Lombard in everyday life, even with complete strangers. Some radio and television programmes, particularly comedies, are occasionally broadcast by the Swiss Italian-speaking broadcasting company in Lombard. Moreover, it is common for people to answer in Lombard in spontaneous interviews. Even some television advertisements have been broadcast in Lombard. The major research institution working on Lombard dialects is in Bellinzona, Switzerland (CDE – Centro di dialettologia e di etnografia, a governmental (cantonal) institution); there is no comparable institution in Italy. In December 2004, it released a dictionary in five volumes, covering all Lombard varieties spoken in the Swiss areas.

=== In Italy ===
A Lombard-speaker, recorded in Italy

Today, in most urban areas of Italian Lombardy, people under 40 years old speak almost exclusively Italian in their daily lives because of schooling and television broadcasts in Italian. However, in rural areas, Lombard is still vital and used alongside Italian.

A certain revival of the use of Lombard has been observed in the last decade. The popularity of modern artists singing their lyrics in Lombard dialects (in Italian rock dialettale, the best known of such artists being Davide Van de Sfroos) is also a relatively-new but growing phenomenon involving the Swiss and the Italian areas.

Lombard is spoken in Campione d'Italia, an exclave of Italy that is surrounded by Swiss territory on Lake Lugano.

== Phonology ==
The following tables show the sounds that are used in all Lombard dialects.

=== Consonants ===
Consonant phonemes
		Labial	Alveolar	(Palato-) alveolar	Velar
Nasal		m	n	ɲ	(ŋ)
Stop	voiceless	p	t		k
Stop	voiced	b	d		ɡ
Affricate	voiceless		t͡s	t͡ʃ	
Affricate	voiced		d͡z	d͡ʒ	
Fricative	voiceless	f	s	ʃ	
Fricative	voiced		z	ʒ	
Approximant	central	ʋ		j	w
Approximant	lateral		l	(ʎ)	
Trill			r		

In Eastern Lombard and Pavese dialect /dz/, /z/ and /ʒ/ merge to [z] and /ts/, /s/ and /ʃ/ merge to [s]. In Eastern Lombard, the last sound is often further debuccalized to [h].

=== Vowels ===
Vowel phonemes
	Front		Central	Back
	Unrounded	Rounded	Central	Back
High	i iː	y yː		u uː
Mid	e eː	ø øː		o
Mid	ɛ	(œ)		ɔ
Low			a aː	

In Western varieties, vowel length is contrastive (Milanese andà "to go" and andaa "gone"), but Eastern varieties normally use only short allophones.

Two repeating orthographic vowels are separated by a dash to prevent them from being confused with a long vowel: a-a in ca-àl "horse".

Western long /aː/ and short /ø/ tend to be back [ɑː] and lower [œ], respectively, and /e/ and /ɛ/ may merge to [ɛ].

=== Alternative spelling systems ===
There have been contemporary attempts to develop alternative spelling systems suitable for use by all variants of Lombard. Among these, there is the attempt to develop a unified spelling (lomb. urtugrafia ünificada), which has not taken root due to the excessive complexity and lack of intuitiveness (as well as the lack of adaptability to the Italian keyboard) of the system, which uses symbols such as ç for /z/ and /ʧ/, or ə for unstressed /a/, /ə/ and /e/, as well as the obligation to mark the vowel length, despite the elimination of the accents on the first grapheme of the digraph (aa and not àa). Some examples are presented below:

Ortografia classica (1600-)	Ortografia ticinese (1907-)	Ortografia moderna (1979-)	Scriver Lombard (2011-)	Noeuva Ortografia Lombarda (2020-)	Phonetic (IPA)	Italian translation
lombard	lumbaart	lumbàrt	lombard	lombard	/lum'ba:rt/	lombardo
su	sü sö	sü sö	su sœ	su soeu	/sy/ (west.) /sø/ (east.)	su
fiœu	fiöö fiöl	fiöö fiöl	fiœl	fioeul	/fjø:/ (west.) /fjøl/ (east.)	ragazzo
comun	cumün comü	cumün comü	comun	comun	/ku'myn/ (west.) /ko'my/ (east.)	comune
nazion	nassiù(n) nazziù(n)	nasiù(n) naziù(n)	nazion	nazzion	/na'sju(n)/ /na'tsju(n)/	nazione
giamò	giamò	giamò	jamò	sgiamò	/ʤa'mɔ/	di già
casetta	caseta	caʃèta	caseta	caseta	/ka'zɛta/	casetta
gatt	gatt	gàt	gat	gat	/gat/	gatto
Lecch	Lecch	Lèch	Lec	Lech	/lɛk/	Lecco
Còmm	Comm; Cumm	Còm; Cum	Com	Com	/kɔm/ /kum/	Como
parlaa	parlaa parlàt	parla parlàt	parlad	parlad	/par'la:/ (west.) /par'lat/ (east.)	parlato
pajœu	pajöö pajöl	paiöö paiöl	paiœl	pajoeul	/pa'jø:/ (west.) /pa'jøl/ (east.)	paiolo
dur	düür	düür	dur	dur	/dy:r/	duro

== See also ==
- Emilian-Romagnol language
- Gallo-Italic of Sicily
- La Spezia–Rimini Line
- Languages of Europe
- Ligurian language
- Piedmontese language
- Pierre Bec
- Romance plurals
- Venetian language

== Sources ==
- Agnoletto, Attilio (1992). San Giorgio su Legnano - storia, società, ambiente. SBN IT\ICCU\CFI\0249761.
- D'Ilario, Giorgio (2003). Dizionario legnanese. Artigianservice. SBN IT\ICCU\MIL\0625963.
- Bernard Comrie, Stephen Matthews, Maria Polinsky (eds.), The Atlas of languages: the origin and development of languages throughout the world. New York 2003, Facts On File. p. 40.
- Brevini, Franco - Lo stile lombardo: la tradizione letteraria da Bonvesin da la Riva a Franco Loi / Franco Brevini - Pantarei, Lugan - 1984 (Lombard style: literary tradition from Bonvesin da la Riva to Franco Loi )
- Glauco Sanga: La lingua Lombarda, in Koiné in Italia, dalle origini al 500 (Koinés in Italy, from the origin to 1500), Lubrina publisher, Bèrghem.
- Claudio Beretta: Letteratura dialettale milanese. Itinerario antologico-critico dalle origini ai nostri giorni - Hoepli, 2003.
- G. Hull: "The linguistic Unity of Northern Italy and Rhaetia, PhD thesis, University of Sydney, 1982; published as The Linguistic Unity of Northern Italy and Rhaetia: Historical Grammar of the Padanian Language, 2 vols. Sydney: Beta Crucis Editions, 2017.
- Jørgen G. Bosoni: «Una proposta di grafia unificata per le varietà linguistiche lombarde: regole per la trascrizione», in Bollettino della Società Storica dell’Alta Valtellina 6/2003, p. 195-298 (Società Storica Alta Valtellina: Bormio, 2003). A comprehensive description of a unified set of writing rules for all the Lombard varieties of Switzerland and Italy, with IPA transcriptions and examples.
- Tamburelli, M. (2014). Uncovering the 'hidden' multilingualism of Europe: an Italian case study. Journal of Multilingual and Multicultural Development, 35(3), 252-270.
- NED Editori: I quatter Vangeli de Mattee, March, Luca E Gioann - 2002.
- Stephen A. Wurm: Atlas of the World's Languages in Danger of Disappearing. Paris 2001, UNESCO Publishing, p. 29.
- Studi di lingua e letteratura lombarda offerti a Maurizio Vitale, (Studies in Lombard language and literature) Pisa: Giardini, 1983
- A cura di Pierluigi Beltrami, Bruno Ferrari, Luciano Tibiletti, Giorgio D'Ilario: Canzoniere Lombardo - Varesina Grafica Editrice, 1970.
- Sanga, Glauco. 1984. Dialettologia Lombarda. University of Pavia. 346pp.
