= Carlo Porta =

Italian poet

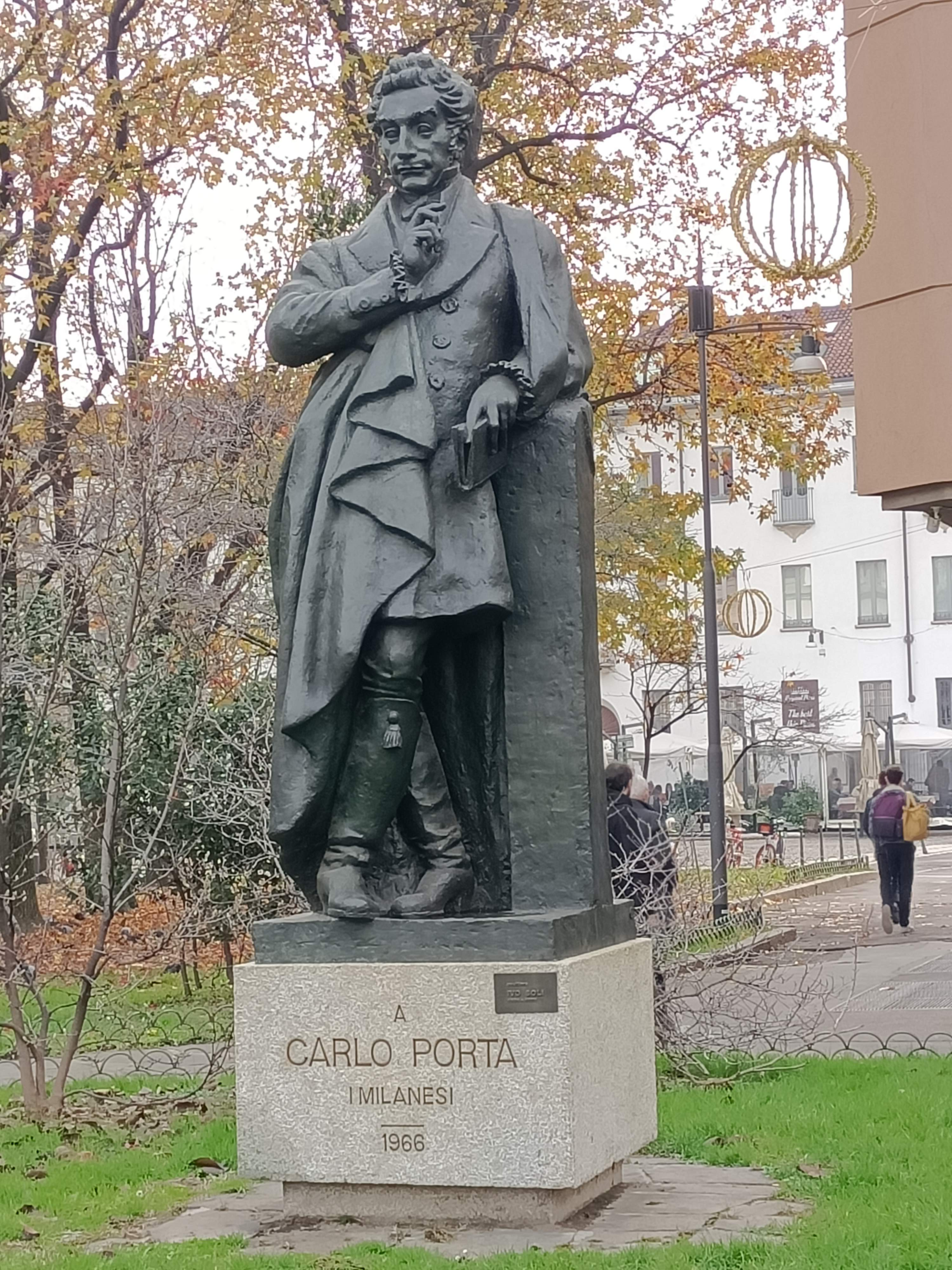
- Statue of Carlo Porta in the "Verzee"
- Born: 15 June 1775; Milan, Duchy of Milan
- Died: 5 February 1821 (aged 45); Milan, Kingdom of Lombardy–Venetia
- Occupations: Poet; Intellectual
- Spouse: Vincenza Prevosti (m. 1806)
- Children: 3
- Parent(s): Giuseppe Porta and Violante Porta (née Gottieri)
- Writing career
- Language: Italian; Milanese
- Period: 18th century
- Genres: Poetry; drama
- Literary movement: Romanticism

Signature
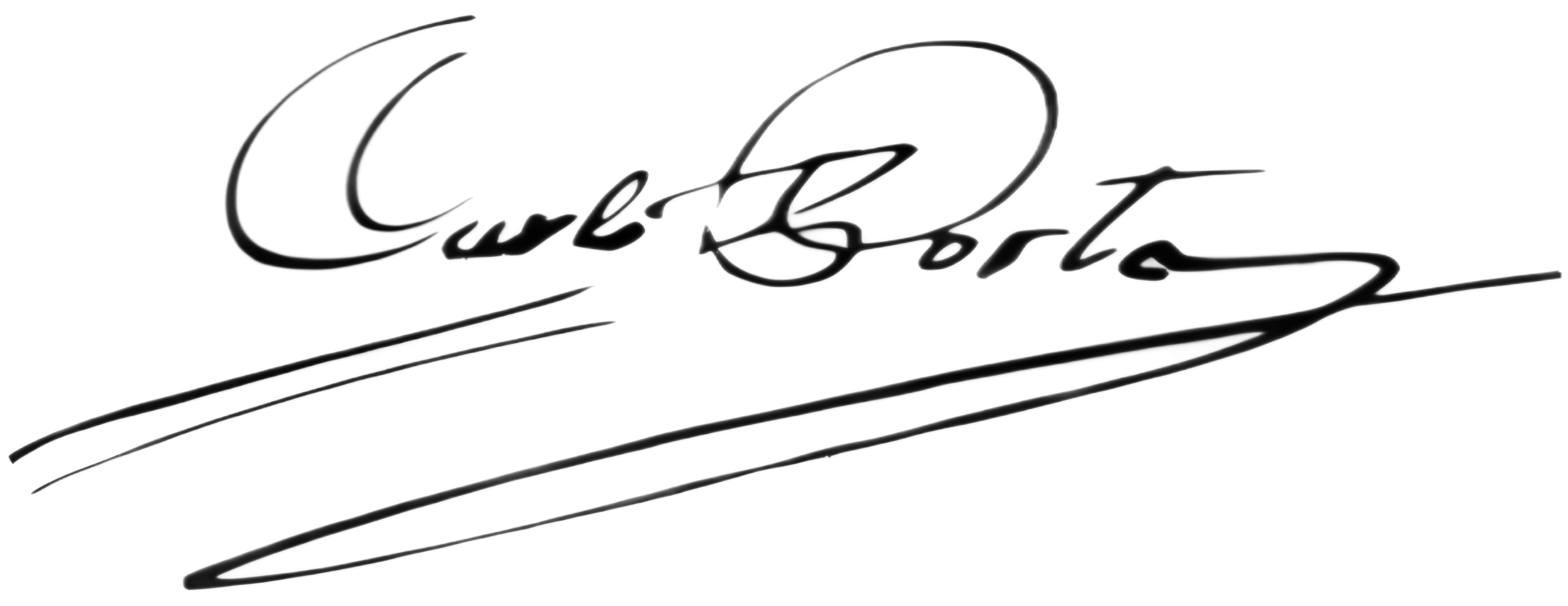

Carlo Porta (15 June 1775 – 5 January 1821) was an Italian poet, the most famous writer in Milanese (the prestige dialect of the Lombard language).

== Biography ==
=== Early life and education ===
Carlo Porta was born in Milan to a well-to-do family. His father, Giuseppe, was a civil servant for the Habsburg administration. He studied in Monza until 1792 and then in the Seminary of Milan. In 1796, the Napoleonic Wars pushed Porta to find a job in Venice (where one of his brothers lived) and he remained there until 1799. For a brief interlude (1800–4) he was a comic actor at the Teatro Patriottico of Milan.

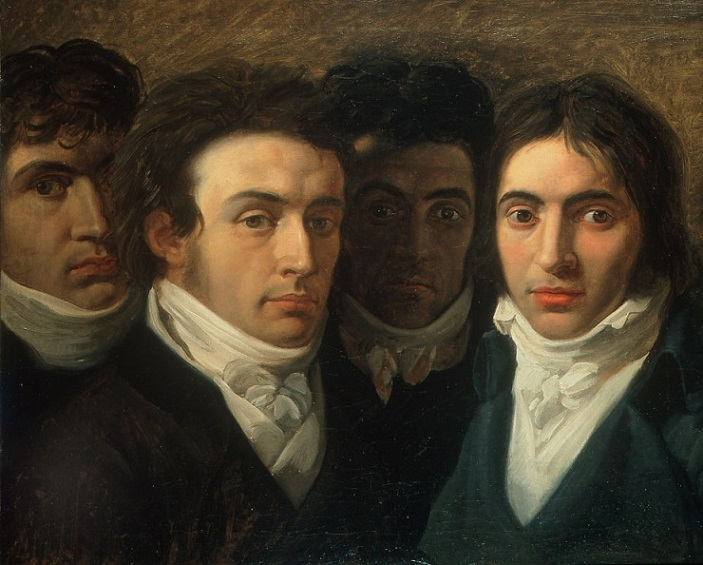
Giuseppe Bossi, Self-portrait with members of the Cameretta Portiana, 1809, oil on canvas, Pinacoteca di Brera, Milan

From 1804 until his death, Porta worked as government employee. He was a leading member of Milanese intellectual circles. In 1816 he opened his own cameretta, a gathering of progressive friends, including Manzoni, Grossi, Berchet and other Romantics, who met once a week to discuss political and literary matters. It was in honor of Porta that Manzoni wrote his only poem in the Lombard language. The cameretta portiana included Giuseppe Bossi, who painted a group portrait of four Amici della Cameretta Portiana.

In 1806, Porta married Vincenza Prevosti, by whom he had three sons.

=== Literary career ===
Porta began to write poems in 1790, although few of them were published before 1810. His first composition, El lavapiatt del Meneghin ch'è mort (‘The Dead Meneghino's Dish-washer’, 1792), pays homage to the Meneghino (the traditional commedia dell'arte character representing Milan) and to Carlo Maria Maggi, who had invented him. Veneration for Maggi as the forefather of the Lombard tradition and reworkings of the Meneghino character as the embodiment of the Milanese man of the people run throughout his poetry.

The next landmark in his poetic production was a partial translation into Milanese of Dante's Inferno (1802–5), the first ever known dialect translation of Dante.

His most famous poems were written from 1812. They can be divided into three categories: works against superstition and religious hypocrisy, descriptions of vivid Milanese popular characters, and political works. The first one includes Fraa Zenever ("Brother Juniper", 1813), On Miracol ("A Miracle", 1813), Fraa Diodatt ("Brother Adeodato", 1814), La mia povera nonna la gh'aveva ("My dead granny had...", 1810). His political satires were mainly sonnets, such as Paracar che scappee de Lombardia ("Scarecrows [literally 'milestones', referred to Frenchmen] who are escaping from Lombardy", 1814), E daj con sto chez-nous, ma sanguanon ("And go on with this 'chez-nous', but bloody Heaven...", a satire about French, 1811), Marcanagg i politegh secca ball (1815, "Goddam ballbreaker politicians"), Quand vedessev on pubblegh funzionari ("When I'd see a public officer...", 1812). Porta satirized the upcoming new Milanese aristocracy, too, in La nomina del cappellan (1819, "The chaplain's appointment"), making a parody of the episode of the "vergine cuccia" ("virgin pet-pup") in Il Giorno (Il Mezzogiorno), by Giuseppe Parini (a satire itself).

His most popular poems include Desgrazzi de Giovannin Bongee (‘The Misfortunes of Giovannino Bongeri’, 1812), with its follow-up, Olter desgrazzi de Giovannin Bongee (‘More Misfortunes of Giovannino Bongeri’, 1814), and Lament del Marchionn di gamb avert (‘The Lament of Bandy-Legged Melchior’, 1816). All three are narrative poems about poor, ill-treated, unassuming, Milanese lower-class men, such as long-suffering Marchionn, who tells of the misdeeds of his gorgeous and vivacious wife, ‘la Tetton’ (‘Big Tits’). But the most famous of a series of low-life female characters is Ninetta, the prostitute who is the protagonist of La Ninetta del verzee (1814), generally considered his masterwork.

The verzee, the main vegetable market in Milan, already immortalized by Maggi as the locus of Milanese popular culture, looms large throughout Porta's poetry. In On funeral (‘A Funeral’, 1816) he celebrates the ‘scoeura de lengua del Verzee’ (‘language school of the vegetable market’), from which he returns with a shopping basket laden with popular erudition freely given by maidservants and barrow-boys. Porta also overtly affirms the superiority of his dialect over the national language in ‘Calca l'aratro è ver, fatica e suda’, which alternates lines of Italian and Milanese, and contrasts the flimsy sentiment that fizzles out in teasing games, as expressed in the codified, rarefied Tuscan of the lyrical tradition, with the sincere and straight-forward love which the rural proletarian voices in Milanese dialect.

Anti-clerical satire is the focus of Ona vision (‘A Vision’), Fraa Zenever (‘Friar Juniper’), (‘Friar Godgiven’, 1813–14), and El viacc de fraa Condutt (‘Friar Condutt's Trip’, 1816). Porta's last poems, La nomina del cappellan (‘The Appointment of the Chaplain’, 1819), Meneghin biroeu di ex monegh (‘Meneghino Servant of the Former Nuns’, 1820), and La guerra di prett (‘The Priests' War’, 1821), portray a bitterly sarcastic picture of the effects of the Austrian Restoration on Milanese life.

Porta's favourite metre is ottava rima, especially in the narrative poems, which follow oral modes of verse narrative in other ways too, employing formulas which suggest gestures to listening spectators or at times developing direct addresses to them. The result is a striking air of immediacy and humour.

Porta died in Milan in January 1821 from an attack of gout and was buried in the Church of San Gregorio. His tomb was subsequently lost, but his tombstone is still conserved in the vault of San Gregorio church, in Milan. Together with his contemporary Giuseppe Gioacchino Belli, Porta is considered one of the most important dialect poets in Italian literary history. His poems quickly reached European fame and were praised and admired by Gogol, Stendhal and many others. He exerted a strong influence on the Milanese Scapigliatura and on Carlo Emilio Gadda.

== See also ==
- Insubric literature
- Domenico Balestrieri

== Bibliography ==
- Momigliano, Attilio (1972). L'opera di Carlo Porta, studio compiuto sui versi ed inediti. Citta di Castello: Lapi.
- Herbermann, Charles, ed. (1913). "Carlo Porta" . Catholic Encyclopedia. New York: Robert Appleton Company.
- Mazzoni, Guido (1935). "PORTA, Carlo". Enciclopedia Italiana. Rome: Istituto dell'Enciclopedia Italiana.
- Bezzola, Guido (1972). Le charmant Carline. Biografia critica di Carlo Porta. Milan: Il Saggiatore.
- Isella, Dante (1982). "Carlo Porta". In Emilio Cecchi; Natalino Sapegno (eds.). Storia della Letteratura Italiana. Vol. VII. Milan: Garzanti.
- Haller, Hermann W. (1986). The Hidden Italy: A Bilingual Edition of Italian Dialect Poetry. Detroit: Wayne State University Press.
- Haller, Hermann W. (1999). The Other Italy: The Literary Canon in Dialect. Toronto: University of Toronto Press. ISBN 0802044247.
- Milanini, Claudio (2016). "PORTA, Carlo". Dizionario Biografico degli Italiani (in Italian). Vol. 85: Ponzone–Quercia. Rome: Istituto dell'Enciclopedia Italiana. ISBN 978-88-12-00032-6.
