= Milanese dialect =

Lombard dialect spoken in Milan

Milanese
- milanes, milanés
- Native to: Italy
- Region: Lombardy (Metropolitan City of Milan, northern part of the province of Pavia)
- Language family: Indo-European: Italic; Latino-Faliscan; Romance; Italo-Western; Western Romance; Gallo-Romance; Gallo-Italic; Lombard–Piedmontese?; Lombard; Western Lombard; Milanese

Language codes
- ISO 639-3: –
- Glottolog: mila1243
- IETF: lmo-u-sd-itmi

Milanese (endonym in traditional orthography Milanes, Meneghin) is the central variety of the Western dialect of the Lombard language spoken in Milan, the rest of its metropolitan city, and the northernmost part of the province of Pavia. Milanese, due to the importance of Milan, the largest city in Lombardy, is often considered one of the most prestigious Lombard variants and the most prestigious one in the Western Lombard area.

In Italian-language contexts, Milanese (like most indigenous Romance varieties spoken in Italy other than standard Italian) is often called a dialetto ('dialect'). This can be misunderstood to mean a variety of the Tuscan-derived national language, which it is not. Lombard in general, including Milanese, is a sister language of Tuscan, thus also of Italian, rather than a derivative. Typologically, Lombard is a Western Romance language, and more closely resembles other Gallo-Italic languages in northern Italy (e.g. Piedmontese, Ligurian, Emilian, Romagnol) as well as others further afield, including Occitan and Romansh.

== Distribution ==
The Milanese dialect as commonly defined today is essentially concentrated around Milan and its metropolitan city, reaching into the northernmost part of the province of Pavia. Subdialects of Milanese – also known as dialètt arios – are spoken in the western part of the province (Castano Primo, Turbigo, Abbiategrasso, Magenta), the eastern part (Gorgonzola, Cassina de' Pecchi, Cernusco sul Naviglio, Segrate, Bellinzago), the parts to the north of the Naviglio Martesana (Carugate, Cassano d'Adda, Inzago, Gessate), certain areas where the dialect becomes transitional (between Saronno and Rho), the southern parts (Binasco and Melegnano), and the northern parts of the province of Pavia (north of the line between Bereguardo and Landriano, which includes places such as Trovo and Casorate Primo).

Historically, up to the late 19th century, "Milanese" was also used to define the dialects spoken in Brianza and in the areas of Varese (Varesòtt) and Lecco (Lecches); less commonly it was also used to cover the whole Western Lombard dialect area, which had in Milanese its most prestigious variety.

== Orthography ==
As Milanese, like the Lombard language as a whole, is not an officially recognized language anywhere, there have been many different orthographic conventions, including pan-Lombard proposals (like the Scriver Lombard orthography), and conventions limited to Western Lombard (the Unified Insubric Orthography). The de facto standard for Milanese, though, is the literary classical Milanese orthography (Ortografia Milanesa Classega).

Classical Milanese orthography is the oldest orthographic convention still in use and it is the one used by all writers of Milanese literature, most famously by Carlo Porta. The trigraph ⟨oeu⟩ (sometimes written ⟨œu⟩), used to represent the /ø/ phoneme, is considered the most distinctive feature of this standard. Since the latter half of the 20th century, as a consequence of the Italianization of Lombardy with the Lombard language ceasing to be the main language of daily use in Milan, the Classical orthography has been contested and lost ground as Italian speakers often find it counterintuitive. Classical Milanese orthography, which often reflects etymology, has indeed many words closely resembling their Italian cognates, but pronunciation is often different, one of the most striking examples being orthographic doubled consonants which represent geminates in Italian but a short preceding vowel (if stressed syllable) in Milanese: compare Italian ⟨caro⟩ /ˈkaro/ (dear) and ⟨carro⟩ /ˈkarro/ (cart) with its Milanese cognates ⟨car⟩ /ˈkaːr/ and ⟨carr⟩ /ˈkar/.

== Example ==
=== English ===
Our Father, Who art in heaven, Hallowed be Thy Name; Thy Kingdom come, Thy will be done, on earth as it is in heaven. Give us this day our daily bread, and forgive us our trespasses, as we forgive those who trespass against us; and lead us not into temptation, but deliver us from evil.

=== Milanese ===
Pader nòster, che te seet in ciel che 'l sia faa sant el tò nòmm che 'l vegna el tò regn, che 'l sia faa 'l tò vorè, come in ciel, inscì anca in su la terra. Dann incoeu el nòster pan de tucc i dì, e perdonon i nòster peccaa, inscì come anca num ghe perdonom a quij che n'hann faa on tòrt. E menon minga in de la tentazion, ma liberon del maa, e che 'l sia inscì.

=== Italian ===
Padre nostro che sei nei cieli, sia santificato il tuo Nome, venga il tuo Regno, sia fatta la tua Volontà come in cielo così in terra. Dacci oggi il nostro pane quotidiano, e rimetti a noi i nostri debiti come noi li rimettiamo ai nostri debitori, e non ci indurre in tentazione, ma liberaci dal Male. Così sia/Amen.

=== Latin ===
Pater noster qui es in caelis / sanctificetur nomen tuum / adveniat regnum tuum / fiat voluntas tua sicut in caelo et in terra / panem nostrum cotidianum da nobis hodie / et dimitte nobis debita nostra sicut et nos dimittimus debitoribus nostris / et ne nos inducas in tentationem sed libera nos a malo. Amen.

== See also ==
- Carlo Porta
- Western Lombard dialects
