= Old Gallo-Italic =

Language spoken from 900 until 1500

- Old Lombard; Old Northern Italian; Old Gallo-Italian
- lonbardo, lombardesco
- Native to: Northern Imperial Italy
- Ethnicity: Northern Italians
- Era: Evolved into several languages such as Lombard, Piedmontese, Ligurian, Emilian, Romagnol, and Judeo-Italian in 1500.
- Language family: Indo-European: Italic; Latino-Faliscan; Latin; Romance; Italo-Western; Western Romance; Gallo-Iberian; Gallo-Romance; Gallo-Italic; Old Gallo-Italic
- Early forms: Old Latin: Vulgar Latin; Proto-Romance

Language codes
- ISO 639-3: –
- Glottolog: gall1279

Old Gallo-Italic, also referred as Old Lombard, or Old Northern Italian is a Gallo-Romance language spoken from 900 until 1500. The language is similar to Old Occitan, which was spoken around the same area. Most texts were written in the Lombard koiné.

== History ==
=== Before the 13th century ===
Before the 13th century, the literary language in northern Italy was Old Occitan, being prominent in the 12th century. The first text in a vernacular, in an early form of Piedmontese, is in the Church of Santa Maria Maggio in Vercelli, dating from 1040. Another text from 1106 is in the Church of Sant'Evasio in Casale Monferrato. One of the works of Raimbaut de Vaqueiras, Domna, tan(t) vos ai preiada, featured early Genovese Ligurian.

The sermones subalpini was a text in early Old Piedmontese from the 12th century, and is a document devoted to the education of the Knights Templar stationed in Piedmont.

=== 13th and 14th centuries ===
Around the 13th century, many authors would ditch Old Occitan, Old French, and Latin for their native language. Several texts were made in Old Gallo-Italic, such as Bonvesin da la Riva's works, Sermon divin, the autobiography of Uguçon da Laodho, Splanamento, the works of Guido Faba and Giacomin da Verona.

== Characteristics ==
- The c-cedilla (ç) could be used before e, shown in the names Berrençers and Uçer.
- Future tense -ero may be from either Occitan or Latin, which was a very common feature in Gallo-Italic texts from the time.
- Old Gallo-Italic shows a compound future tense, as in Old Lombard a portare instead of portarà.

== Phonology ==
The phonology of Old Gallo-Italic was similar to those of Old French and Italian.

=== Consonants ===
	Labial	Dental/ Alveolar	Palato- alveolar	Palatal	Velar
Stop	p b	t d			k ɡ
Affricate		ts dz	t͡ʃ d͡ʒ		
Fricative	f v	s z	ʃ ʒ		
Lateral		l			
Trill		r			
Flap		ɾ			
Approximant				j	w
Nasal	m	n		ɲ	

- Some changes include the change of /ɾ/ to /r/, as seen with Modern Lombard, Piedmontese, Ligurian, Emilian and Romagnol.

=== Vowels ===
	Front		Central	Back
	Unrounded	Rounded	Central	Back
High	i	y		u
Mid	e	ø	ə	o
Mid	ɛ		ə	ɔ
Low			a	

== Dialects ==
- Old Lombard
  - Lombard
  - Siculo-Lombard
  - Lucano-Lombard
- Old Piemontese
  - Piedmontese
- Old Ligurian
  - Ligurian
- Old Venetian (?)
  - Venetian
- Old Emilian–Rumagnol
  - Emilian
  - Romagnol

== Literature and tradition ==
=== Authors ===
==== 13th century ====
- Bonvesin dra Riva (Milan): multiple poems; including Liber di Tre Scricciur;
- Pietro da Barsegapè (Milan): Sermon Divin from 1274;
- Uguçon da Laodho (Lodi): his autobiography;
- Gerard Pateg (Cremona): Splanamento;
- Giacomin da Verona: multiple poems;
- Guido Fava (Bologna): Gemma purpurea e Parlamenta et epistole;

==== 14th century ====
- Antonio da Ferrara: Prima che ‘l ferro arossi i bianchi pili;
- Nicolò de' Rossi (Treviso): Canzoniere;
- Francesco Vannozzo (Padova): Rime;
- Bernabò Visconti (Milan): Lamento.

==== 15th century ====
- Giovan Giorgio Alione (Asti): multiple poems;
- Lancino Curti (Milan): Meditatio in Hebdomadam Olivarum;

== Sample text ==
Liber di Tre Scricciur

In nom de Jesu Criste e de Sancta Maria
Quest'ovra al so onor acomenzadha sia:
Ki vol odir cuintar parol de baronia,
Sì olza e sì intenda per soa cortesia.

Odir e no intende negata zovarave
E ki ben intendesse anc negata farave
Ki no metess in ovra so k'el intenderave:
O l'om no mett lo cor e l'ingegn nient vare.

In questo nostro libro da tre guis è scrigiura:
La prima sì è negra e è de grand pagura
La segonda è rossa, la terza è bella e pura
Pur lavoradha a oro ke dis de grand dolzura.

English translation:

Book of the Three Scriptures

In the name of Jesus Christ, and Saint Mary
This work began in their honor:
Who wants to hear a valuable speech,
Please listen and understand.

Listening and not understanding would do no good,
And whoever understood well would still conclude nothing,
If he does not put into practice what he has understood:
What you don't put your heart and ingenuity into has no value.

In this book we deal with three types of writing:
The first is black and instills great fear
The second is red, the third is beautiful and pure,
Also worked with gold, so much so that you would say it is of great refinement.

== See also ==
- Gallo-Italic languages
- Old Gallo-Romance language
