= Faba (disambiguation) =

Vicia faba is a species of vetch, a flowering plant in the pea and bean family Fabaceae.

Faba may also refer to:

- Faba Mill., a synonym of Vicia L.
- 3-hydroxyoctanoyl-(acyl-carrier-protein) dehydratase, an enzyme
- Guido Faba (c. 1190 – c. 1245), Bolognese rhetorician
- Faba, a fictional character in the video games Pokémon Sun and Moon
