= Eating utensil etiquette =

Social conventions of cutlery usage

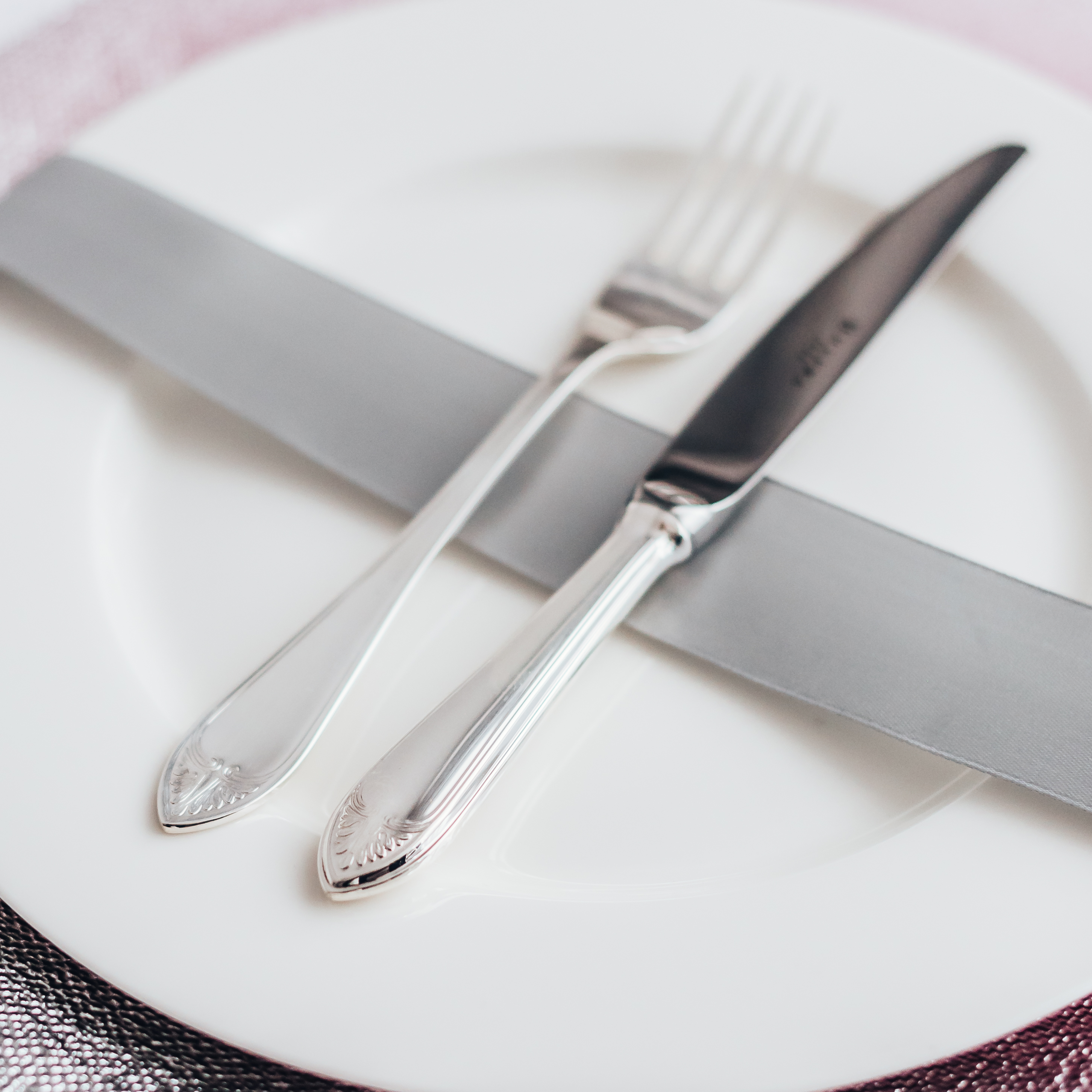
Dinner plate with knife and fork

Various customary etiquette practices exist regarding the placement and use of eating utensils in social settings. These practices vary from culture to culture. Fork etiquette, for example, differs in Europe, the United States, and Southeast Asia, and continues to change. In East Asian cultures, a variety of etiquette practices govern the use of chopsticks.

== Fork etiquette ==
When used in conjunction with a knife to cut and consume food in Western social settings, two forms of fork etiquette are common. In the European style, which is not uniform across Europe, the diner keeps the fork in the left hand; in the Western style, the fork is shifted between the left and right hands. Prior to the adoption of the fork, the custom in Europe was for all food to be conveyed to the mouth by the right hand (using a spoon, a knife, or fingers). When the fork was adopted, it followed this rule; it was held in the left hand while cutting and then transferred to the right to eat. This custom was brought to America by British colonists and became the American style. Most of Europe adopted the more rapid style of leaving the fork in the left hand in relatively modern times.

The difference between the American and European styles has been used as plot point in fictional works, including the 1946 film O.S.S. and the 2014 series Turn: Washington's Spies. In both works, using the wrong fork etiquette threatens to expose undercover agents.

=== German style ===
The German style, also called the continental or European style despite the fact that it is not uniform across Europe, is to hold the fork (with the tines pointing down) in the left hand and the knife in the right. Once a bite-sized piece of food has been cut, it is speared and conducted to the mouth by the left hand. For items which can not be speared, such as peas or rice, the tines of the fork point up and the blade of the knife is used to assist or guide placement of the food on the fork. The knife and fork are both held with the handle running along the palm and extending out to be held by thumb and forefinger. This style is sometimes called "hidden handle" because the palm conceals the handle.

=== French and British style ===
The French table setting involves placing the fork tines pointing down on the table on the left hand side of the plate. This was done to show the coat of arms that was traditionally on that side contrary to Germany or the United Kingdom. In the United Kingdom, the fork tines face upward while sitting on the table.

The knife should be in the right hand and the fork in the left. However, if a knife is not needed – such as when eating pasta – the fork can be held in the right hand. Bread is always served and can be placed on the table cloth itself. It is considered unacceptable to use one's fingers to taste the food. To taste a sauce before serving oneself, however, it is permissible to place a small piece of bread at the end of the fork for dipping.

=== American style ===
In the American style, also called the zig-zag method or fork switching, the knife is initially held in the right hand and the fork in the left. Holding food in place with the fork tines-down, a single bite-sized piece is cut with the knife. The knife is then set down on the plate, the fork transferred from the left hand to the right hand, and the food is brought to the mouth for consumption. The fork is then transferred back to the left hand and the knife is picked up with the right. In contrast to the European hidden handle grip, in the American style the fork is held much like a spoon or a pen once it is transferred to the right hand to convey food to the mouth.

One commentator has asserted that the American style of fork-handling is in decline, with the increased use of a hybrid of the traditional American and European styles. In this new style, the fork is not switched between hands between cutting and eating and may also be deployed "tines-up" as a scoop when convenient.

In defense of the traditional American style, Judith Martin wrote, "Those who point out that the European manner is more efficient are right. Those who claim it is older or more sophisticated—etiquette has never considered getting food into the mouth faster a mark of refinement—are wrong."

=== Southeast Asian style ===
In the Southeast Asian style, the spoon is held in the right hand throughout consumption, except with certain dishes when a fork is more suitable. Rice and soups are a staple of the diet in Southeast Asian countries, so using a spoon is practical in such dishes. The spoon is used for manipulating food on the plate; knives are rarely used. Dishes are often cut into small portions before cooking, eliminating the need for a knife.

== Table setting ==
Tables are often set with two or more forks, meant to be used for different courses; for example, a salad fork, a meat fork, and a dessert fork. Some institutions wishing to give an impression of high formality set places with many different forks for meals of several courses, although many etiquette authorities regard this as vulgar and prefer that the appropriate cutlery be brought in with each course.

In American dining etiquette, different placements are used when setting down the utensils to indicate whether a diner intends to continue eating or has finished.

== Cutlery placement after eating ==
In the United States, a diner may place all their utensils together in a "4-o'clock" position on their plate, to indicate to waiting staff that they have finished their course and the plate may be taken away.

== Chopstick etiquette ==
While etiquette customs for using chopsticks are broadly similar from region to region, finer points can differ. In some Asian cultures, it is considered impolite to point with chopsticks, or to leave them resting in a bowl. Leaving chopsticks standing in a bowl can be perceived as resembling offerings to the deceased or spirits.

== See also ==
- Table manners
- Montreal–Philippines cutlery controversy
