= Old Lombard dialect =

Romance language spoken in the 13th and 14th centuries

Old Lombard
- lonbardo, lombardesco
- Native to: Italy
- Region: Northern Italy, specifically the Lordship of Milan, Crema, Cremona, Lodi, and Bressa.
- Ethnicity: Lombards
- Era: Evolved into Modern Lombard, Siculo-Lombard and Lucano-Lombard in the end of the 14th century.
- Language family: Indo-European: Italic; Latino-Faliscan; Latin; Romance; Italo-Western; Western Romance; Gallo-Iberian; Gallo-Romance; Gallo-Italic; Lombard–Piedmontese; Old Lombard
- Early forms: Old Latin: Vulgar Latin; Proto-Romance; Old Gallo-Romance?; Old Gallo-Italic
- Writing system: Latin

Language codes
- ISO 639-3: –

Old Lombard (Old Lombard: lombardesco, lonbardo) is an Old Gallo-Italic dialect and the earliest form of Lombard. Spoken in the 13th and 14th centuries within the Late Middle Ages, several folks such as the Milanese writers Bonvesin da la Riva and Pietro da Barsegapé in the Duecento wrote in this dialect.

== Characteristics ==
Old Lombard shows precursors to modern Lombard in many areas and thus represents a helpful source for its historical grammar. The distinguishing features include:

- Outlauent vowels are often still preserved. For example, the intermediate stage quisti 'this' can be proven, which emerged from *questi through metaphony and became quist in Modern Lombard by apocope.
- In contrast to the present Lombard, the subject pronoun could still be omitted (e.g. B. avé no podeven fioli "[They] could not have children," Vita di Sant'Alessio 17).
- There are still remnants of the perfect. However, it is already shown many times how their clarity is endangered by sound change. For example, the forms dicit 'says' and dixit 'said', the latter coincide via *di(s)se to /ˈdize/.
- Morphologically, the literary Old Lombard is characterized, among other things, by the presence of numerous shape variants (polymorphisms). For example, apocopated infinitives stand on -à next to full forms on -are.

== State of research ==
Although Old Lombard is well documented, the research is still subject to some limitations. Since the medieval copyists did not use diacritical signs in the sense of modern orthography, the spelling often does not provide immediate information about the sound level. Often there are also Latinized, Tuscan, or Occitan spellings that cannot be reconciled with Lombard pronunciation. Since no elisions were marked in the medieval manuscripts, it is not possible, for example, to conclusively determine whether or in which cases ⟨che⟩ stands for the mere conjunction che 'that' and how often the sequence actually ch'e 'that I' can be read.Such questions are of central importance for the development of the mandatory subject pronouns in modern Lombardic.

== Sample text ==
Liber di Tre Scricciur

In nom de Jesu Criste e de Sancta Maria
Quest'ovra al so onor acomenzadha sia:
Ki vol odir cuintar parol de baronia,
Sì olza e sì intenda per soa cortesia.

Odir e no intende negata zovarave
E ki ben intendesse anc negata farave
Ki no metess in ovra so k'el intenderave:
O l'om no mett lo cor e l'ingegn nient vare.

In questo nostro libro da tre guis è scrigiura:
La prima sì è negra e è de grand pagura
La segonda è rossa, la terza è bella e pura
Pur lavoradha a oro ke dis de grand dolzura.

English translation:

Book of the Three Scriptures

In the name of Jesus Christ, and Saint Mary
This work began in their honor:
Who wants to hear a valuable speech,
Please listen and understand.

Listening and not understanding would do no good,
And whoever understood well would still conclude nothing,
If he does not put into practice what he has understood:
What you don't put your heart and ingenuity into has no value.

In this book we deal with three types of writing:
The first is black and instills great fear
The second is red, the third is beautiful and pure,
Also worked with gold, so much so that you would say it is of great refinement.
