= 3-hydroxyoctanoyl-(acyl-carrier-protein) dehydratase =

Class of enzymes

3-hydroxyoctanoyl-[acyl-carrier-protein] dehydratase

Identifiers
- EC no.: 4.2.1.59
- CAS no.: 9030-85-7

Databases
- IntEnz: IntEnz view
- BRENDA: BRENDA entry
- ExPASy: NiceZyme view
- KEGG: KEGG entry
- MetaCyc: metabolic pathway
- PRIAM: profile
- PDB structures: RCSB PDB PDBe PDBsum
- Gene Ontology: AmiGO / QuickGO
Search
- PMC: articles
- PubMed: articles
- NCBI: proteins

The enzyme 3-hydroxyoctanoyl-[acyl-carrier-protein] dehydratase (EC 4.2.1.59) catalyzes the chemical reaction

(3R)-3-hydroxyoctanoyl-[acyl-carrier-protein] $\rightleftharpoons$ oct-2-enoyl-[acyl-carrier-protein] + H_{2}O

This enzyme belongs to the family of lyases, specifically the hydro-lyases, which cleave carbon-oxygen bonds. The systematic name of this enzyme class is (3R)-3-hydroxyoctanoyl-[acyl-carrier-protein] hydro-lyase (oct-2-enoyl-[acyl-carrier protein]-forming). Other names in common use include D-3-hydroxyoctanoyl-[acyl carrier protein] dehydratase, D-3-hydroxyoctanoyl-acyl carrier protein dehydratase, beta-hydroxyoctanoyl-acyl carrier protein dehydrase, beta-hydroxyoctanoyl thioester dehydratase, beta-hydroxyoctanoyl-ACP-dehydrase, and (3R)-3-hydroxyoctanoyl-[acyl-carrier-protein] hydro-lyase.

== See also ==
- 3-hydroxypalmitoyl-[acyl-carrier-protein] dehydratase
