= Montreal–Philippines cutlery controversy =

2006 racial controversy in Canada

The Montreal–Philippines cutlery controversy was an incident in 2006 in which a Filipino-born Canadian boy was punished by his school in Roxboro, Montreal, for following traditional Filipino etiquette and eating his lunch with a fork and a spoon, rather than the Canadian tradition of a knife and fork.

In response to the media coverage of the affair, a protest was held outside the Canadian embassy in Manila and the Philippine Ambassador to Canada, José Brillantes, described it as an "affront to Filipino culture." Some commentators saw it as an example of prejudice, nationalism and a culture clash, especially since the school board had previously expelled a Sikh student for carrying a kirpan (blade worn by Sikhs).

== Timeline ==
The boy, John Luke Joachim Gallardo Cagadoc (gallicized as Jean-Luc), was born in 1998 in Manila to Filipino parents from Pampanga and Palawan. The Cagadocs migrated to Quebec, Canada, the same year for job opportunities, settling in Montreal.

In April 2006, schoolteacher Martine Bertrand, who was assigned a role of school lunchroom monitor at École Lalande, sanctioned the then seven-year-old Luc on ten separate occasions for what the school called "disgusting" and "piggish" eating habits: using a fork to push his food onto a spoon before eating it. The school board countered that the boy was punished only for disruptive behavior. The boy's mother, Theresa Gallardo Cagadoc, pursued a formal apology and reported that school principal Normand Bergeron told her in a telephone conversation that in Canada, one should eat with Canadian manners ("Madame, you are in Canada. Here in Canada you should eat the way Canadians eat.").

The story first appeared in the West Island Chronicle. According to the Montreal-area newspaper, when Cagadoc questioned Bergeron about punishing students for their table habits, Bergeron replied that Luc must be moved to another table if he continues to "eat like a pig" as it was their manner of how they discipline students.

In a Chronicle article, Bergeron expanded on his comments, claiming that Luc was sometimes disruptive, which was the reason for his sanctions and not his fork and spoon habits:

[In my conversation with (the mother)] I said, "Here, this is not the manner in which we eat." ... I don't necessarily want students to eat with one hand or with only one instrument, I want them to eat intelligently at the table ... I want them to eat correctly with respect for others who are eating with them. That's all I ask. Personally, I don’t have any problems with it, but it is not the way you see people eat every day. I have never seen somebody eat with a spoon and a fork at the same time.

Later reporting alleged that Luc was warned that he was tardy at the table, and so he reverted to the spoon-feeding method to save time. Luc said that he was separated from his lunchmates any time he ate that way.

Bergeron was subsequently restrained from speaking on the issue by the school board; spokesperson Brigitte Gavreau stated that board policy was that students could eat with any utensils.

A score of protestors outside the Canadian Embassy in Manila appealed for "respect for cultural diversity" and affirmed "we eat with a spoon and we're proud." The item was quickly picked up worldwide, especially in Filipino newspapers and websites.

A security guard was assigned to the primary school, a police cruiser went on duty, and the school principal received a death threat. Fo Niemi, the Cagadocs' lawyer and the executive director for the Center for Research-Action on Race Relations (CRARR), had to actively discourage people from the Filipino community from protesting in front of the school board.

France Pilon, the assistant director of the school board, said that Luc's parents were repeatedly invited to meet with school officials, but declined, reportedly on legal advice. Pilon also said that Luc's parents have instructed him to eat apart from other students.

The case was brought to the Quebec Human Rights Tribunal for formal mediation. For safety and security, Luc was transferred to a different elementary school.

== Commission ruling ==
In 2008 the Quebec Human Rights and Youth Rights Commission ruled that Bertrand's reprimand was an isolated incident, and found no evidence that Bergeron was biased. It found that Luc was disciplined for unsafe eating behavior, not for his cutlery etiquette.

The commission concluded that Luc was clowning around by stuffing a large amount of rice into his mouth, and that the reprimand was for his own safety. The commission concluded that it was discriminatory for Bertrand to have asked Luc if people in "his country" washed their hands before eating.

In November 2008 it was reported that CRARR had asked the Human Rights and Youth Rights Commission to review its decision, alleging anomalies in process that possibly prejudiced the commission's decision. The principal's newspaper comments were allegedly ignored. Theresa Cagadoc said that the human rights commission had interviewed representatives from the school board, but not the Cagadocs. Theresa was reportedly considering an appeal to the Quebec Human Rights Tribunal, a quasi-judicial body, while members of the area's Filipino community wanted to take the case to court.

In April 2010 the Quebec Human Rights Tribunal mandated that the school reimburse the Cagadocs CDN $17,000 in moral and punitive damages. The Tribunal stated that the school principal shared blame for not implementing an intercultural education policy.

== See also ==
- Filipino cuisine
- Eating utensil etiquette
- Etiquette in Asia
- Etiquette in North America
- Pastagate
- Table manners
