= Spoon =

Eating utensil

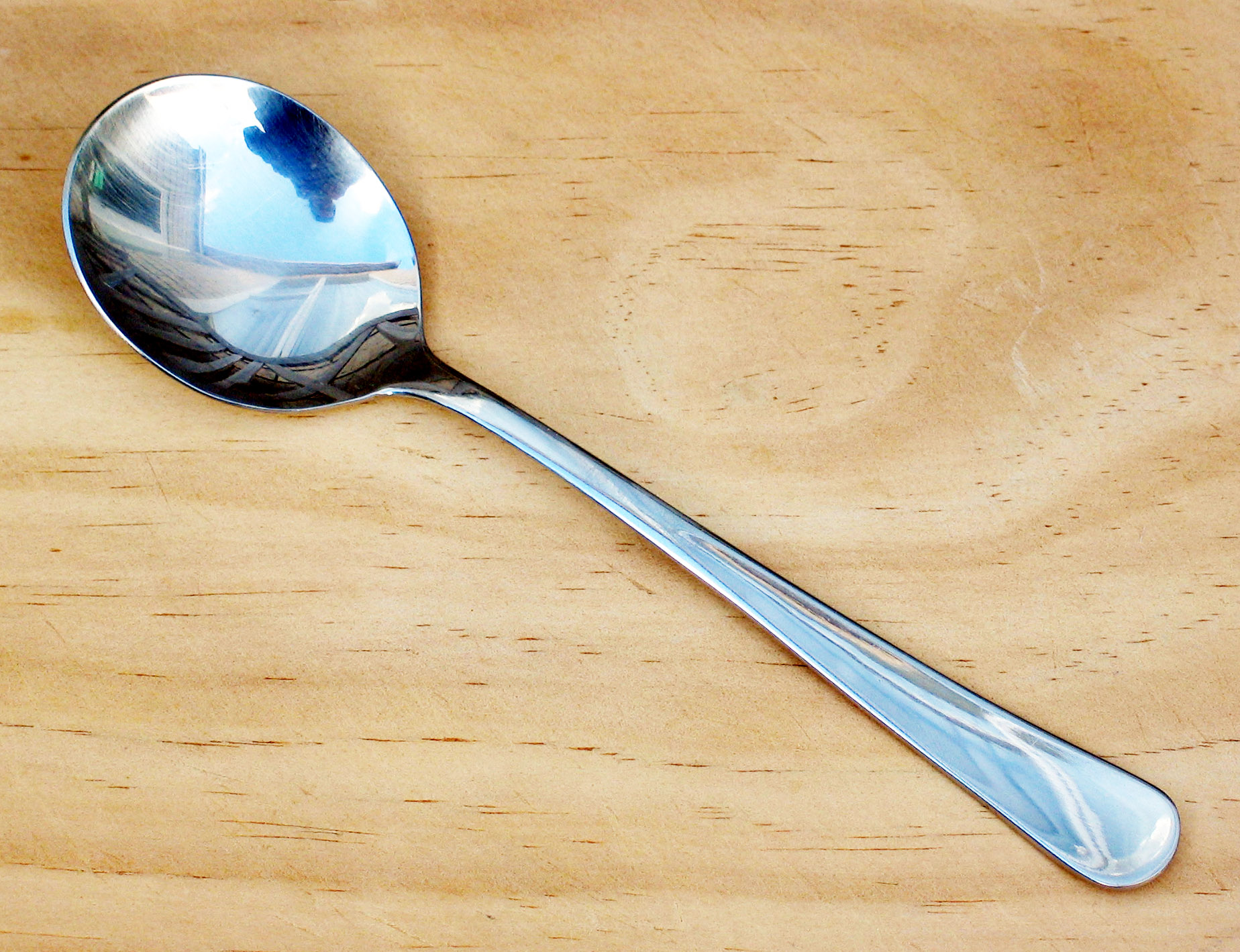
Stainless steel bouillon (soup) spoon

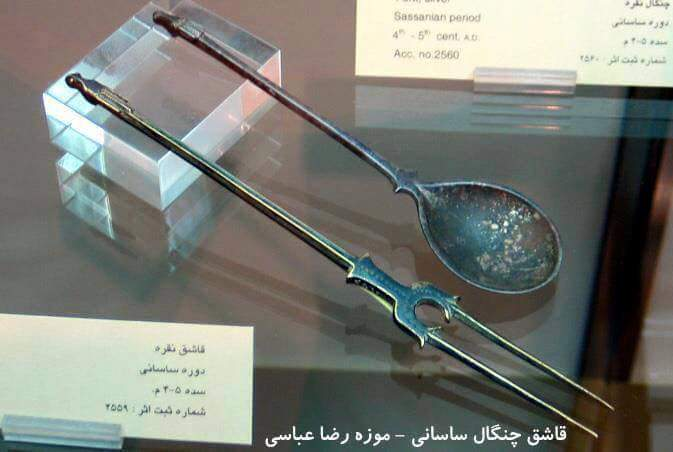
Sasanian spoon and fork (4th century)

A spoon (UK: /ˈspuːn/, US: /ˈspuːn/ SPOON) is a utensil consisting of a shallow bowl (also known as a head), oval or round, at the end of a handle. A type of cutlery (sometimes called flatware in the United States), especially as part of a place setting, it is used primarily for transferring food to the mouth (eating). Spoons are also used in food preparation to measure, mix, stir and toss ingredients and for serving food. Present day spoons are made from metal (notably stainless steel, flat silver or silverware, plated or solid), wood, porcelain or plastic. There are many different types of spoons made from different materials by different cultures for different purposes and food.

== Terminology ==
The spoon consists of a bowl and a handle. A handle in the shape of a slender stick is frequently called a stem. The stem can end in a sharp point or be crowned with a knop, a decorative knob. The knop-top spoons with a variety of knop shapes described by colorful terms like "acorn", "writhen-end" (spiral ornament on a ball), "maidenhead" (a bust), "diamond point," "apostle" were particularly popular in England in the 14th to 17th centuries.

The name spoon came from Old English spon, 'chip'.

== History ==
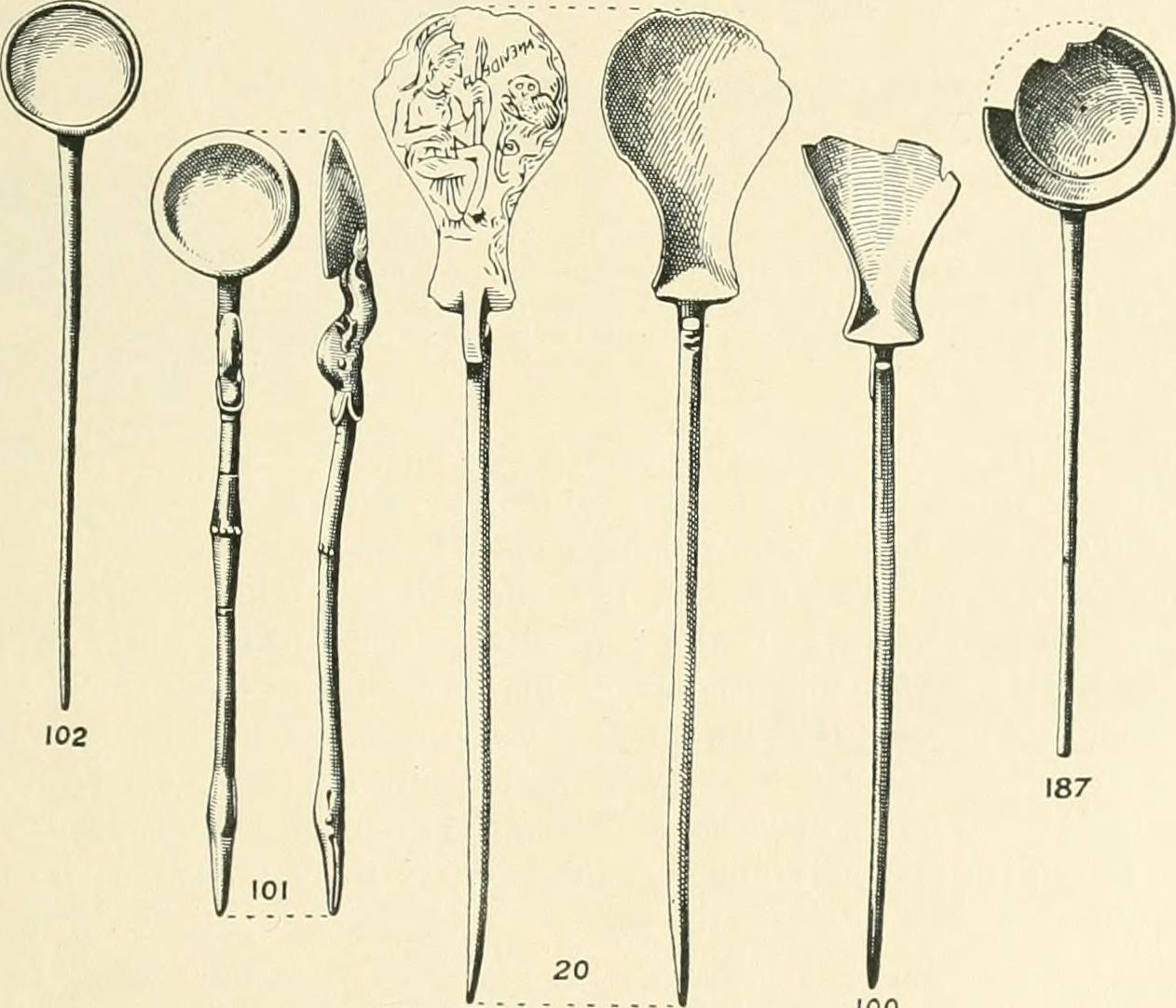
Assorted spoons of the Roman world (British Museum)

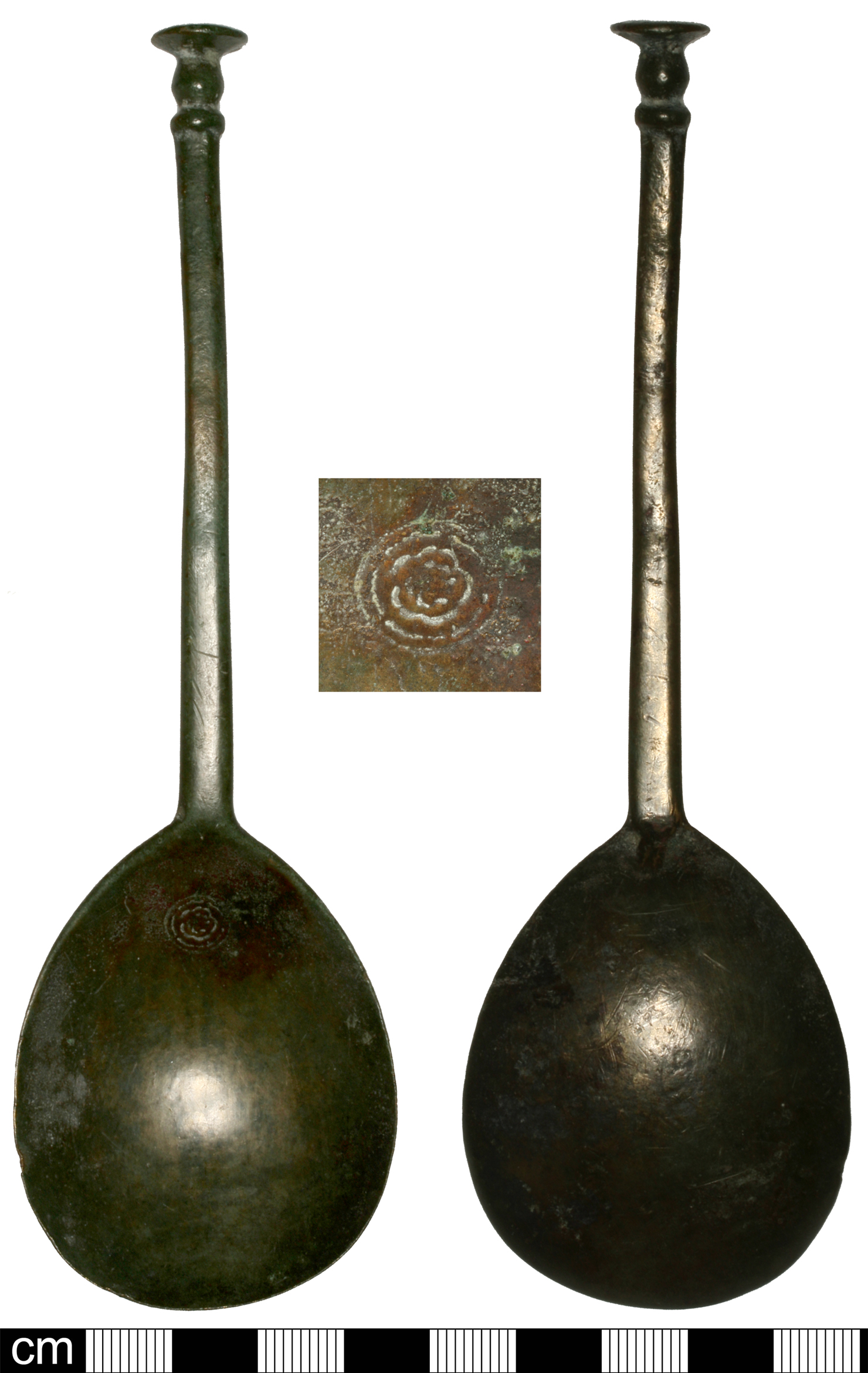
Medieval spoons with seal top

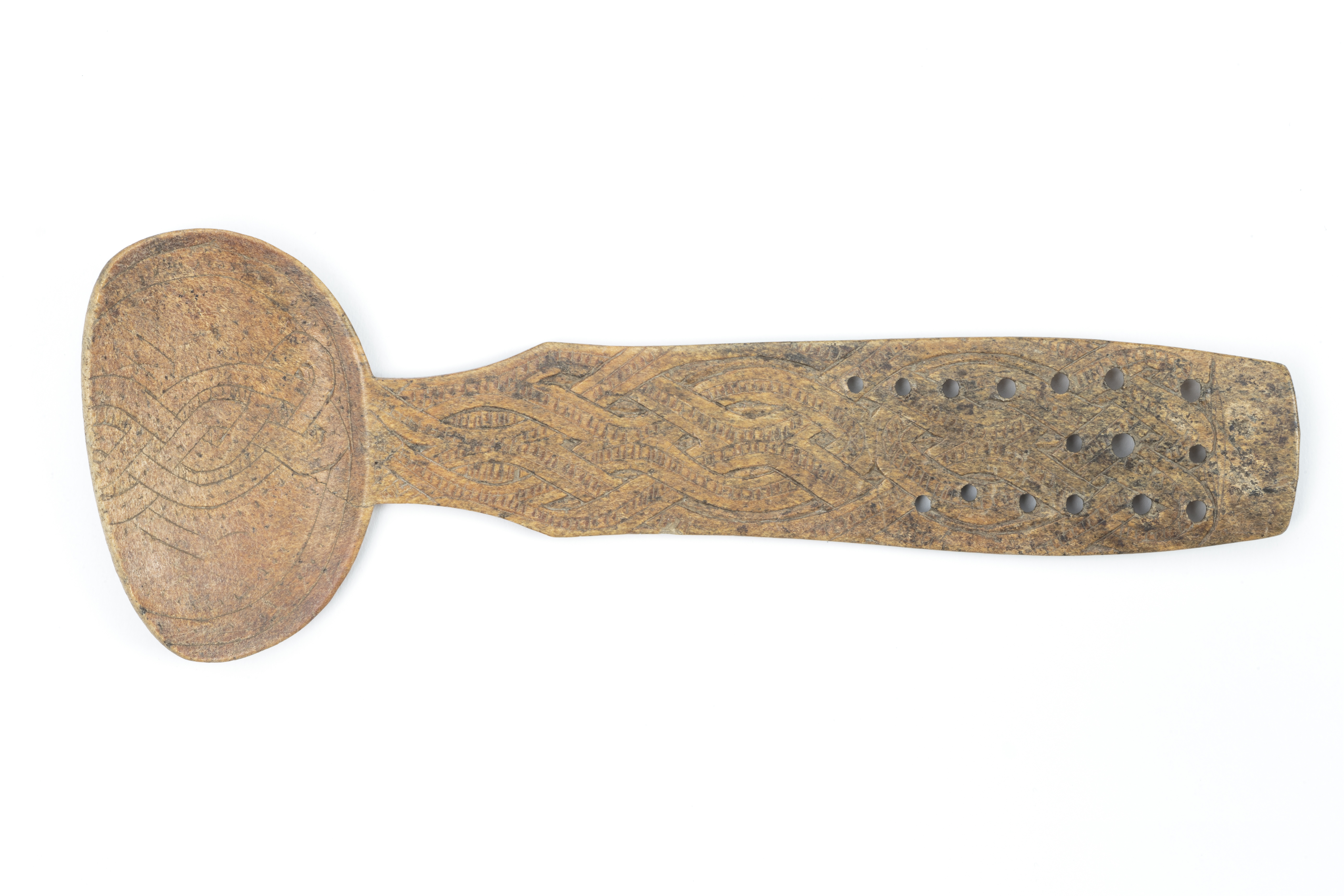
A Crusade-era spoon from 1017 that was found on archaeological excavation of Tursiannotko in Pirkkala, Finland

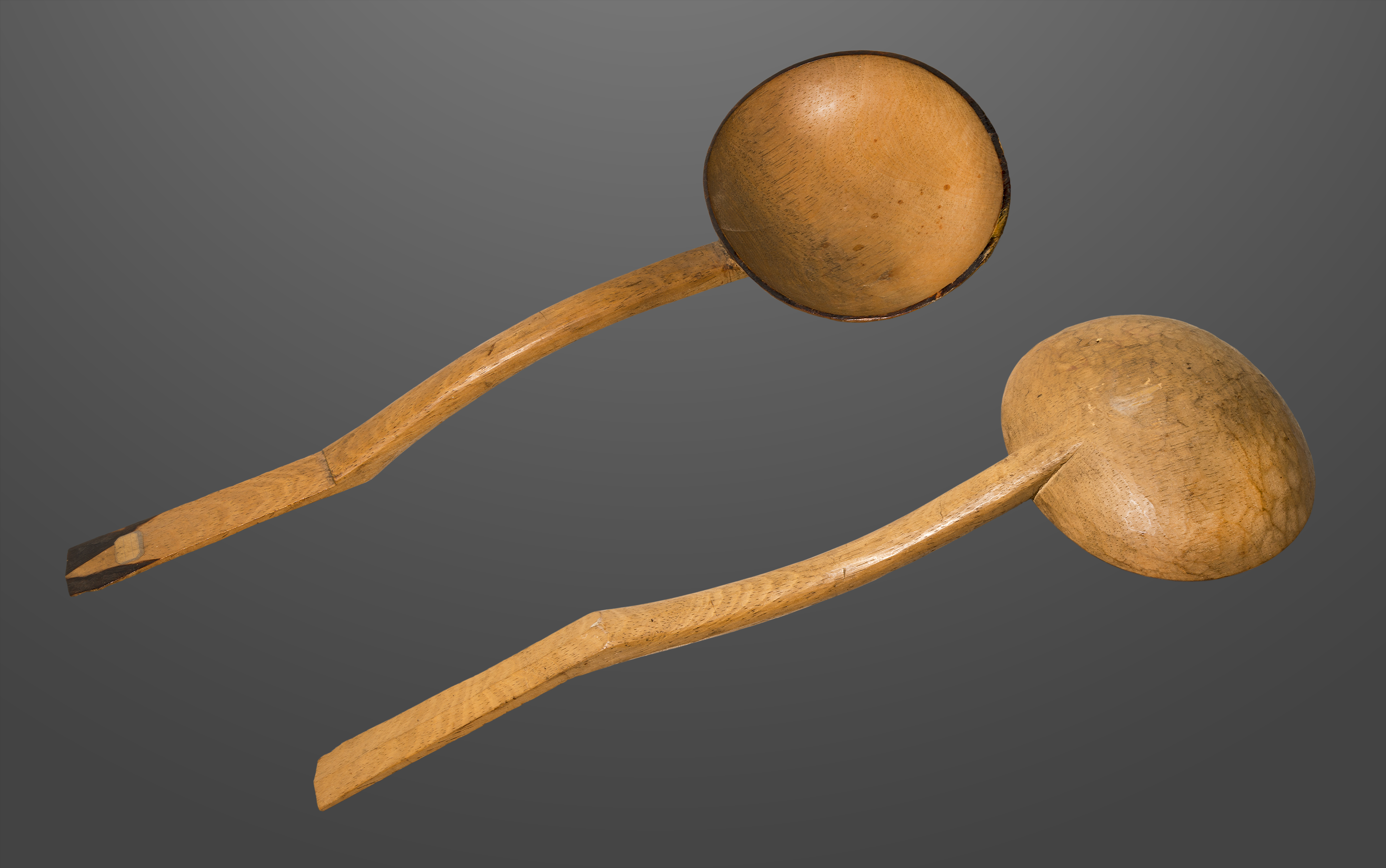
Wooden spoons, Betsileo people, Madagascar, 19th century

Preserved examples of various forms of spoons used by the ancient Egyptians include those composed of ivory, flint, slate and wood, many of them carved with religious symbols. During the Neolithic Ozieri civilization in Sardinia, ceramic ladles and spoons were already in use. In Shang dynasty China, spoons were made of bone. Early bronze spoons in China were designed with a sharp point, and may have also been used as cutlery. The spoons of the Greeks and Romans were chiefly made of bronze and silver and the handle usually takes the form of a spike or pointed stem. There are many examples in the British Museum from which the forms of the various types can be ascertained, the chief points of difference being found in the junction of the bowl with the handle. The ancient Greeks called the spoon mystron (μύστρον), and they also used pieces of bread scooped out in the shape of a spoon, which they called, mystile (μυστίλη).

A 2024 study by archaeologist Andrzej Kokowski and biologists from Maria Curie-Skłodowska University in Lublin, Poland, identified 241 small, spoon-shaped objects at 116 archaeological sites across Scandinavia, Germany, and Poland, dating back to the Roman era. These sites primarily consisted of marshes and graves. The study proposes that these objects, often found alongside items associated with warfare and featuring a small disk 10-20 millimeters in diameter, were likely used to administer drugs, especially stimulants, before battles. Germanic peoples of the era had access to various substances with potential medicinal or psychoactive properties, including poppy, hops, hemp, henbane, belladonna, and certain fungi.

In the early Muslim world, spoons were used for eating soup. Medieval spoons meant for domestic use were commonly made of cow horn or wood, but brass, pewter, and latten spoons appear to have been common in about the 15th century. The full descriptions and entries relating to silver spoons in the inventories of the royal and other households point to their special value and rarity. The earliest English reference appears to be in a will of 1259. In the wardrobe accounts of Edward I for the year 1300 some gold and silver spoons marked with the fleur-de-lis, the Paris mark, are mentioned. One of the most interesting medieval spoons is the Coronation Spoon used in the anointing of the English and later British sovereign; this 12th-century object is the oldest surviving item in the British royal regalia.

The sets of Apostle Spoons, popular as christening presents in Tudor times, the handles of which terminate in heads or busts of the apostles, are a special form to which antiquarian interest attaches. The earlier English spoon-handles terminate in an acorn, plain knob or a diamond; at the end of the 16th century, the baluster and seal ending becomes common, the bowl being fig-shaped. During The Restoration, the handle becomes broad and flat, the bowl is broad and oval and the termination is cut into the shape known as the hind's foot.

In the first quarter of the 18th century, the bowl becomes narrow and elliptical, with a tongue or rat's tail down the back, and the handle is turned up at the end. The modern form, with the tip of the bowl narrower than the base and the rounded end of the handle turned down, came into use about 1760.

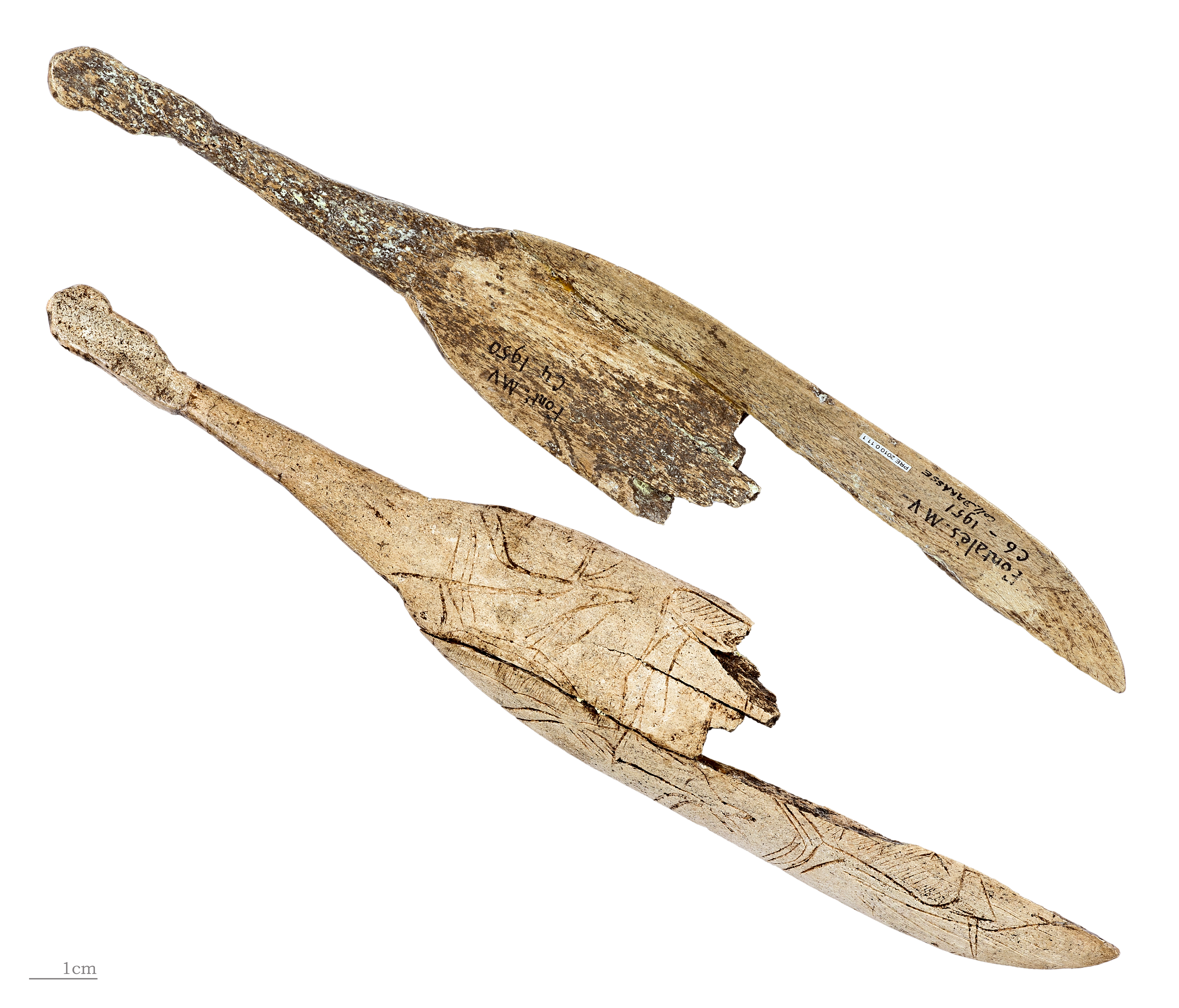
Spoon engraved in reindeer antler, Magdalenian c. 17,000 – c. 12,000 BCE

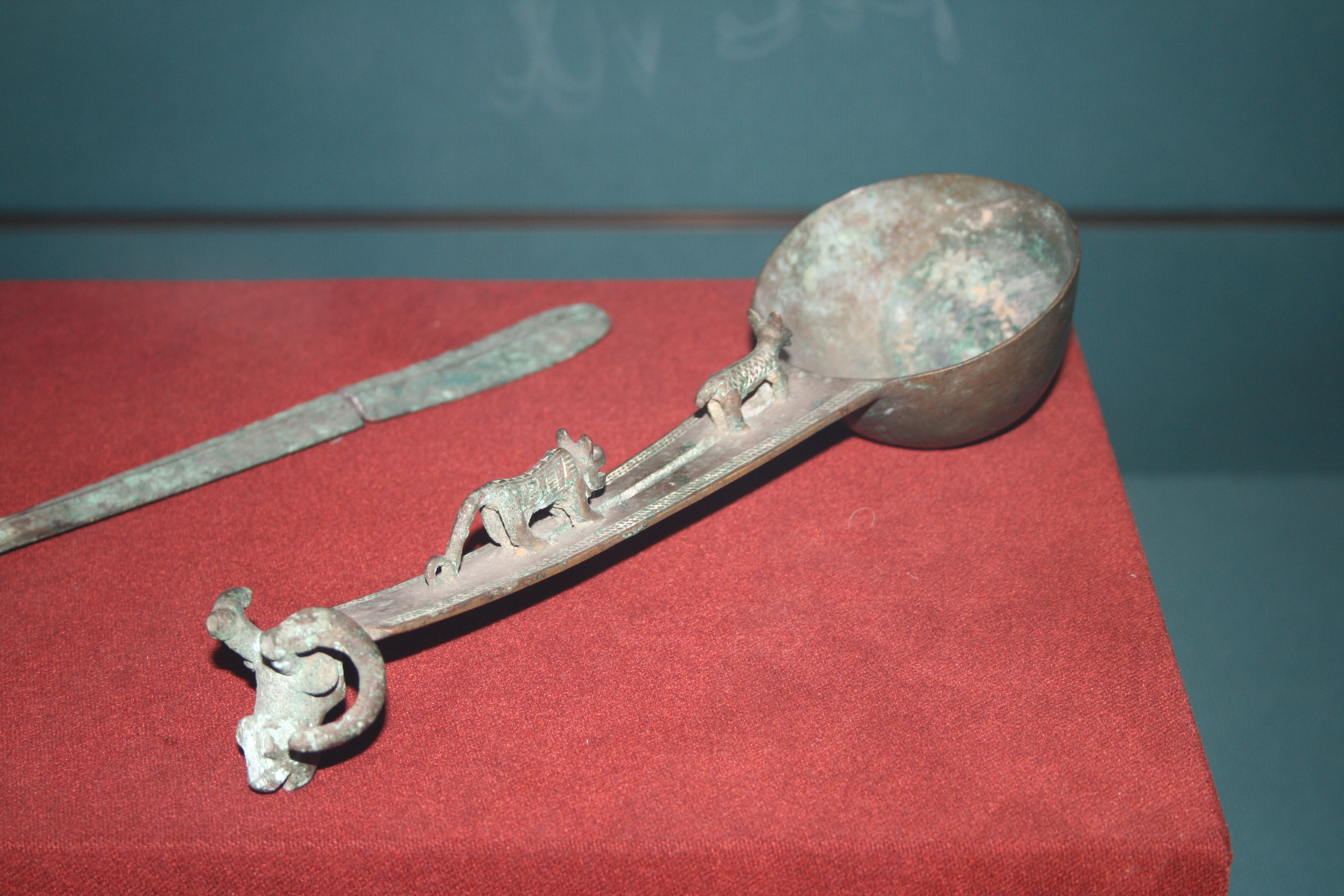
Bronze spoon, Shang dynasty

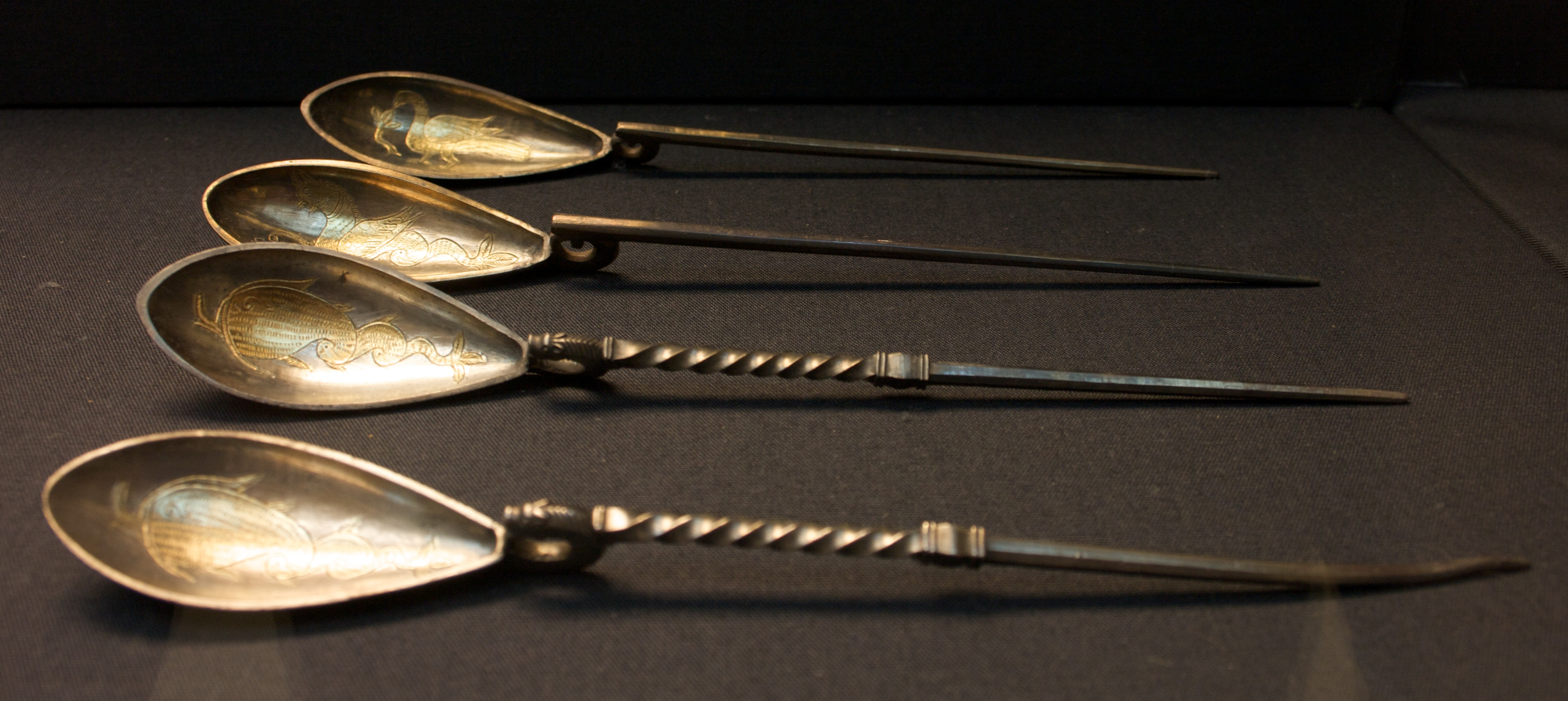
Roman spoons from the Hoxne hoard, c. 4-5th century CE

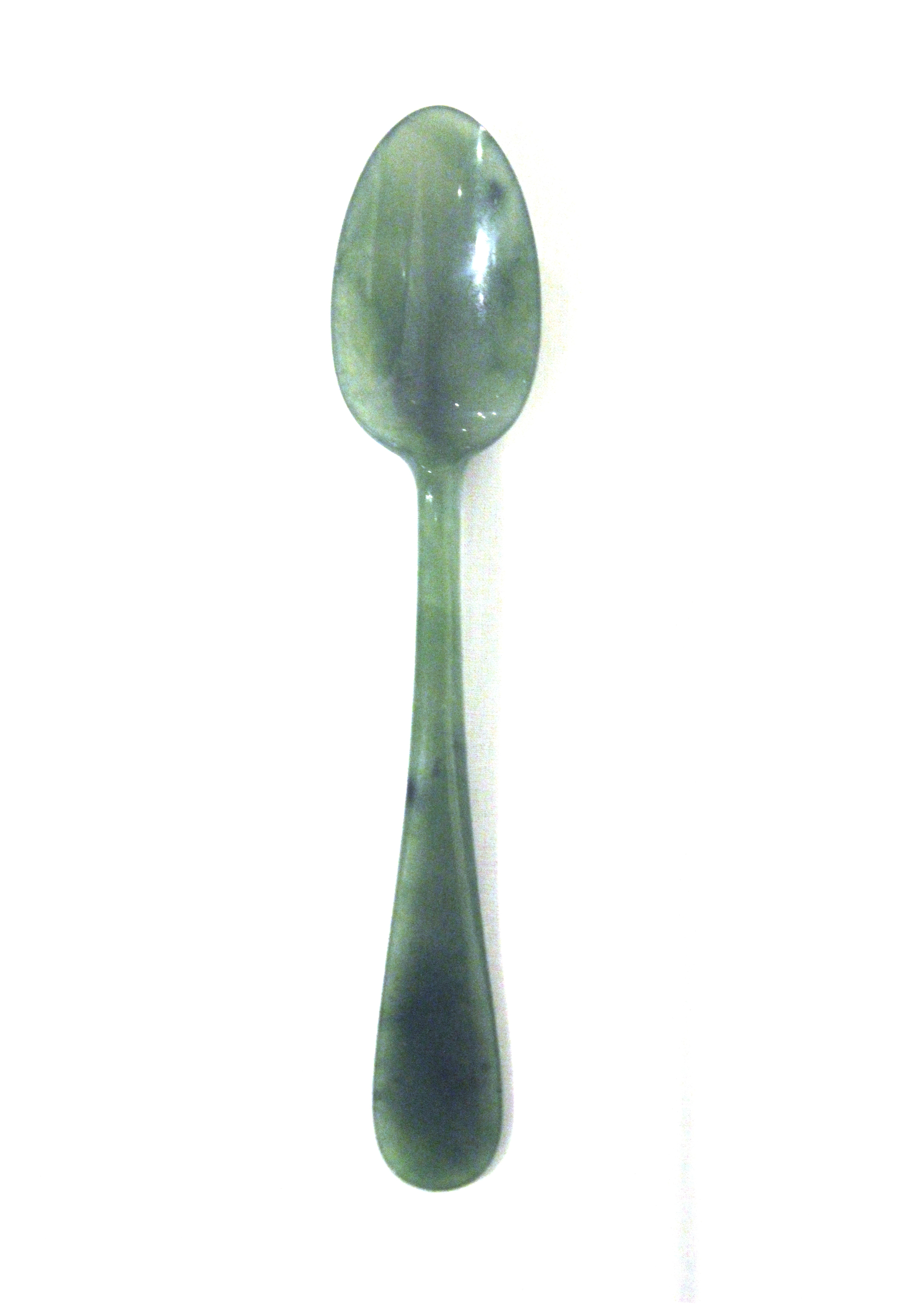
Jade spoon, Mughal dynasty, India

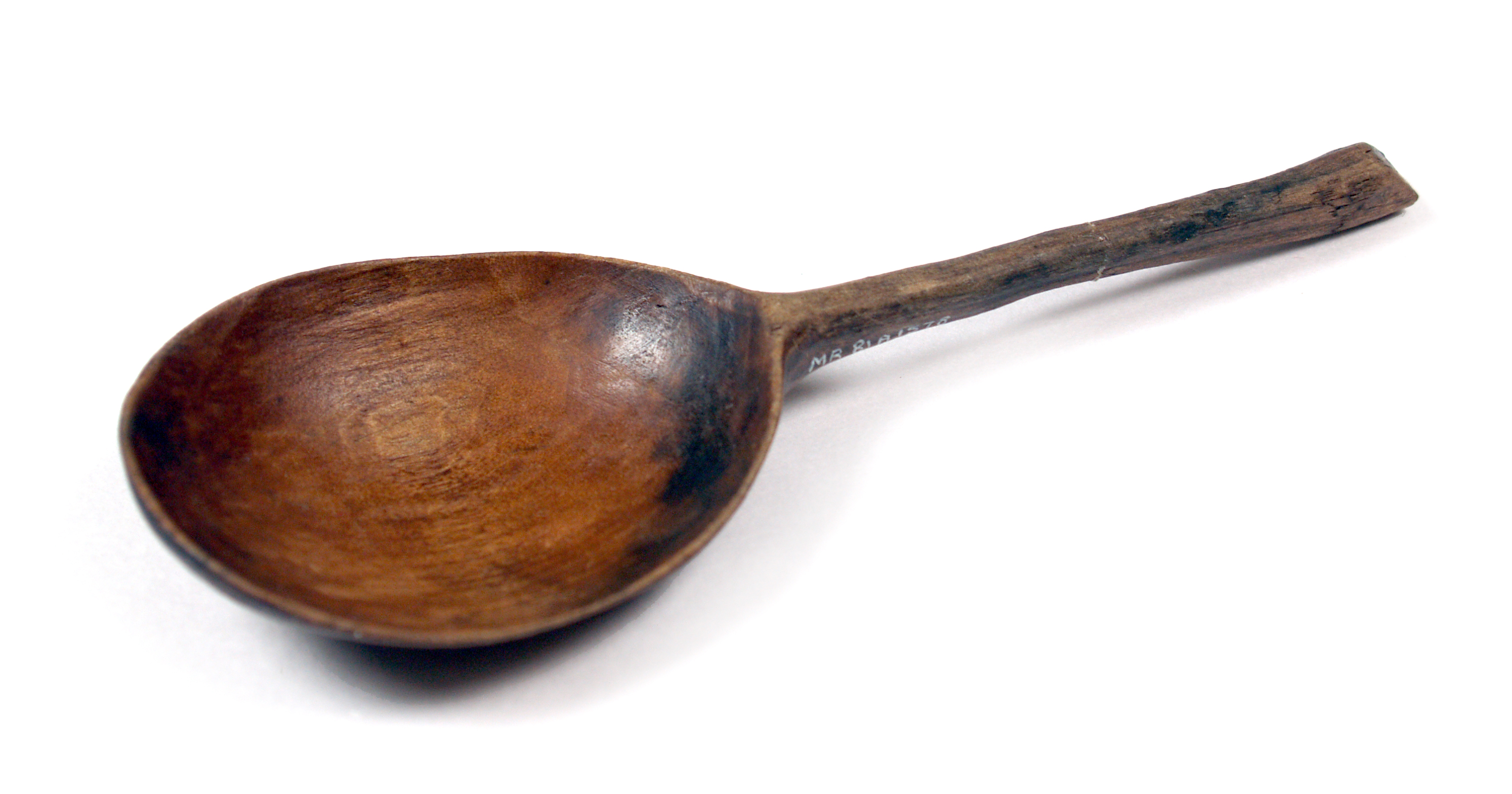
Wooden spoon found on board the 16th century carrack Mary Rose

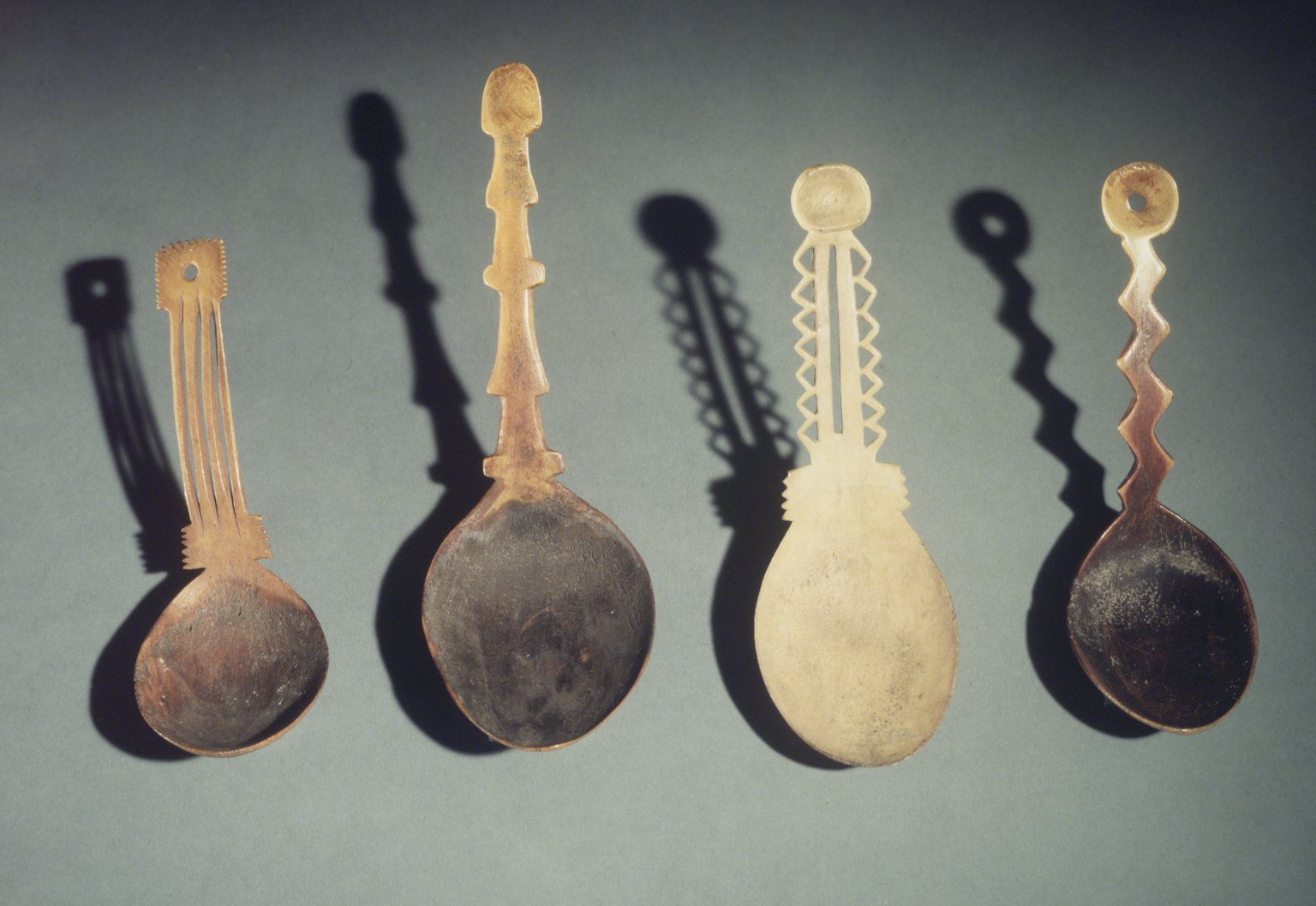
Native American Yurok spoons, 19th century

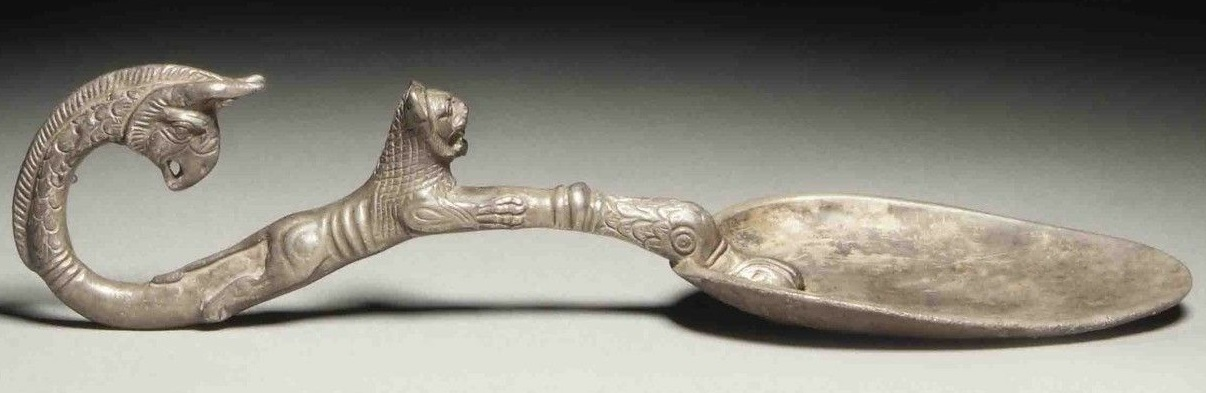
Achaemenid spoon (400 BC)

== Types and uses ==
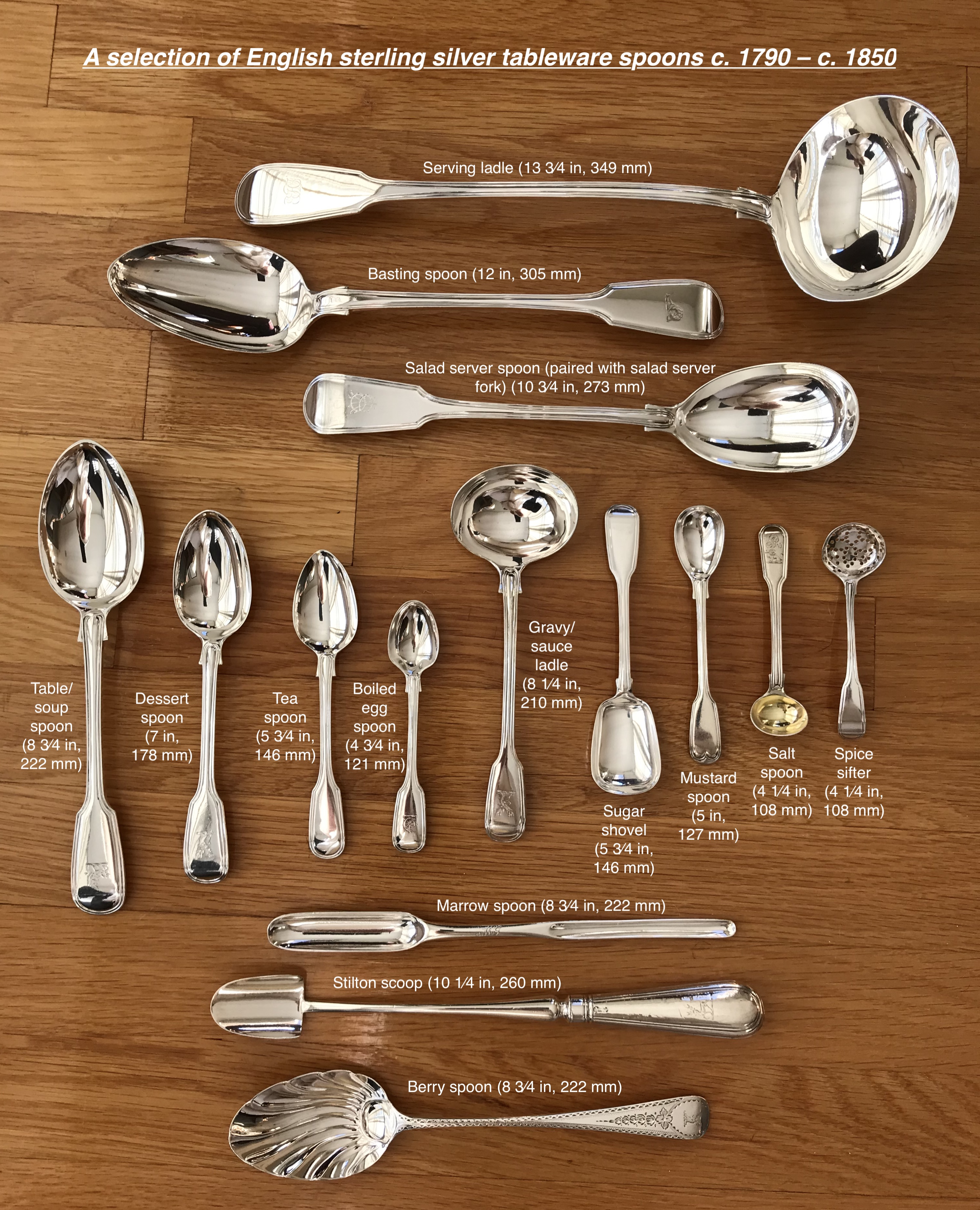
A selection of Georgian-Victorian English sterling silver tableware spoons (c. 1790 – c. 1850)

Spoons are used primarily for eating liquid or semi-liquid foods, such as soup, stew or ice cream, and very small or powdery solid items which cannot be easily lifted with a fork, such as rice, sugar, cereals and green peas. In Southeast Asia, spoons are the primary utensil used for eating; forks are used to push foods such as rice onto the spoon as well as their western usage for piercing the food.

Spoons are also widely used in cooking and serving. In baking, batter is usually thin enough to pour or drop from a spoon; a mixture of such consistency is sometimes called "drop batter". Rolled dough dropped from a spoon to a cookie sheet can be made into rock cakes and other cookies, while johnnycake may be prepared by dropping spoonfuls of cornmeal onto a hot greased griddle.

A spoon is similarly useful in processing jelly, sugar and syrup. A test sample of jelly taken from a boiling mass may be allowed to slip from a spoon in a sheet, in a step called "sheeting". At the "crack" stage, syrup from boiling sugar may be dripped from a spoon, causing it to break with a snap when chilled. When boiled to 240 °F. and poured from a spoon, sugar forms a filament, or "thread". Hot syrup is said to "pearl" when it forms such a long thread without breaking when dropped from a spoon.

Used for stirring, a spoon is passed through a substance with a continued circular movement for the purpose of mixing, blending, dissolving, cooling, or preventing sticking of the ingredients. Mixed drinks may be "muddled" by working a spoon to crush and mix ingredients such as mint and sugar on the bottom of a glass or mixer. Spoons are employed for mixing certain kinds of powder into water to make a sweet or nutritious drink. A spoon may also be employed to toss ingredients by mixing them lightly until they are well coated with a dressing.

For storage, spoons and knives were sometimes placed in paired knife boxes, which were often ornate wooden containers with sloping tops, used especially during the 18th century. On the table, an ornamental utensil called a nef, shaped like a ship, might hold a napkin, knife and spoon.

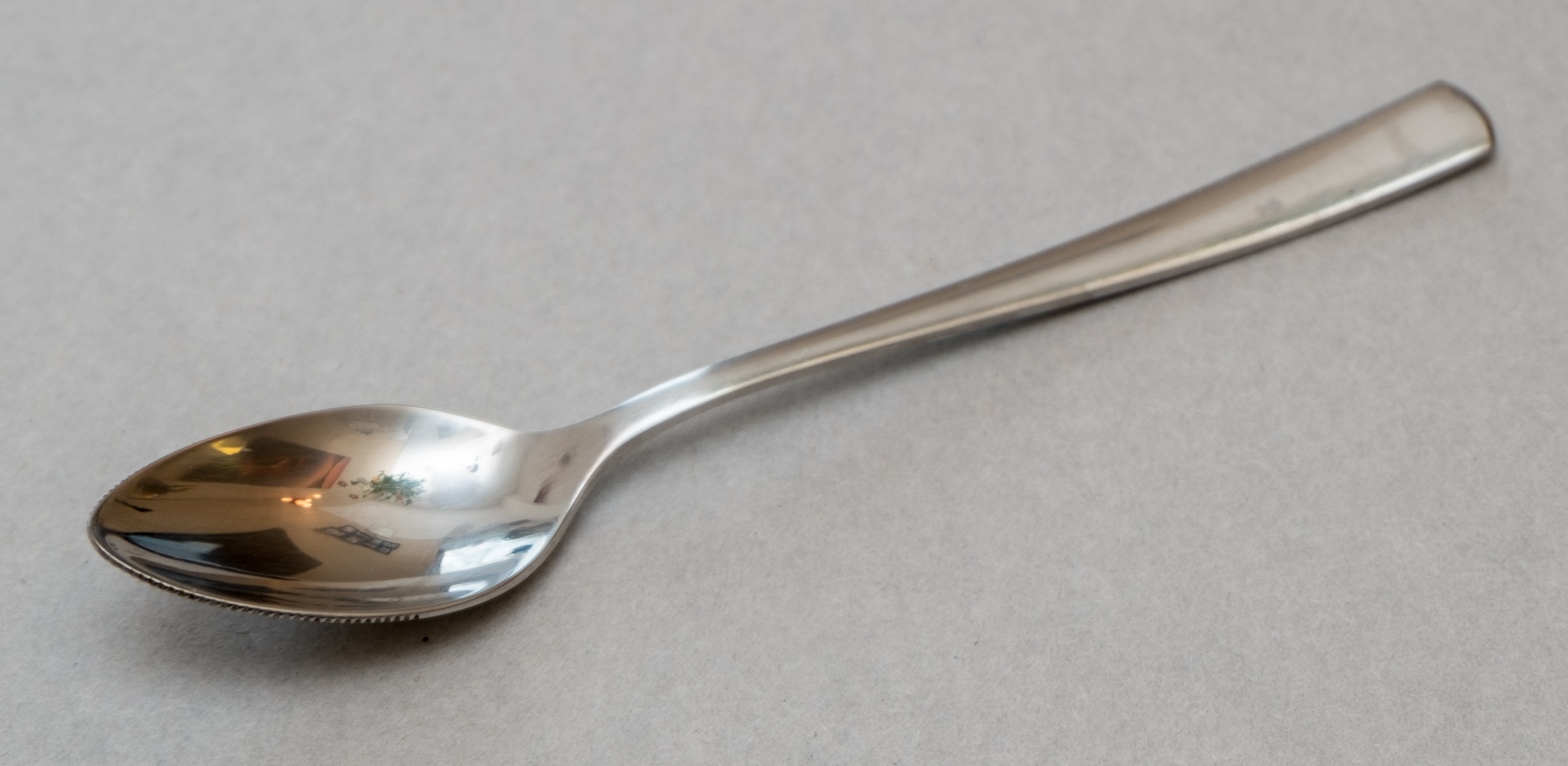
Spoon with a special tip for kiwifruits or melons

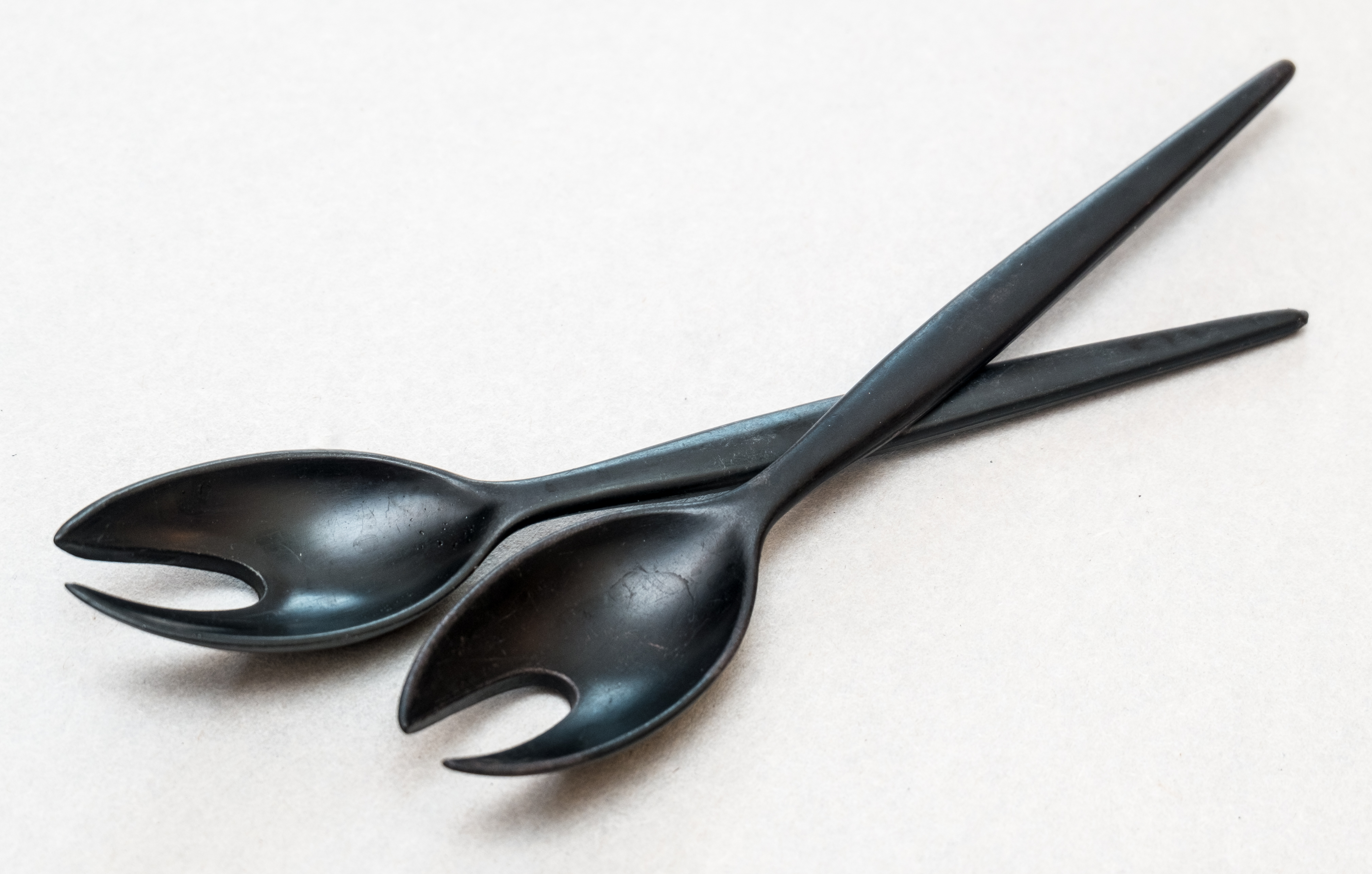
Spoons for salad

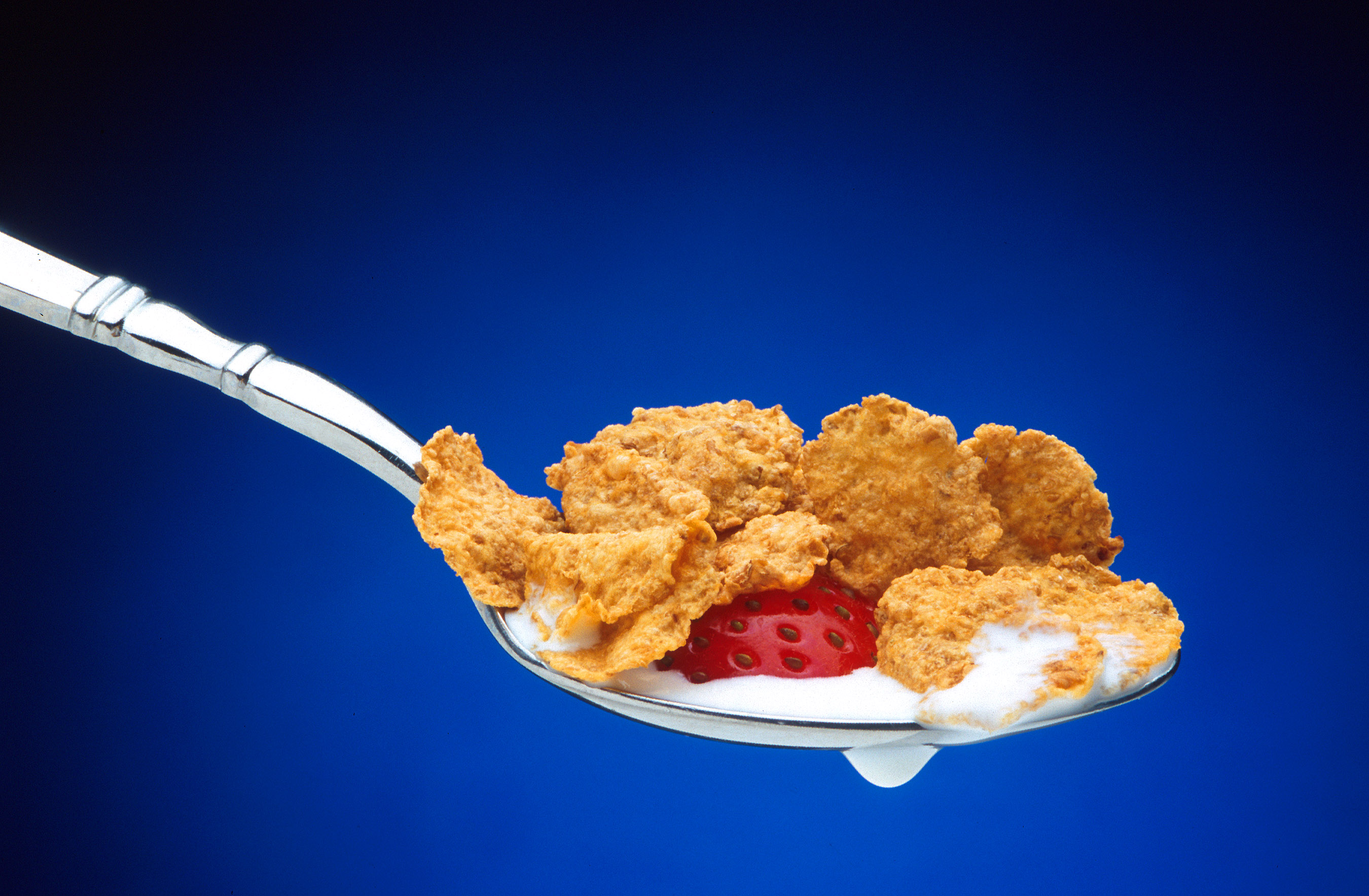
Cold breakfast cereal held in a dessert spoon

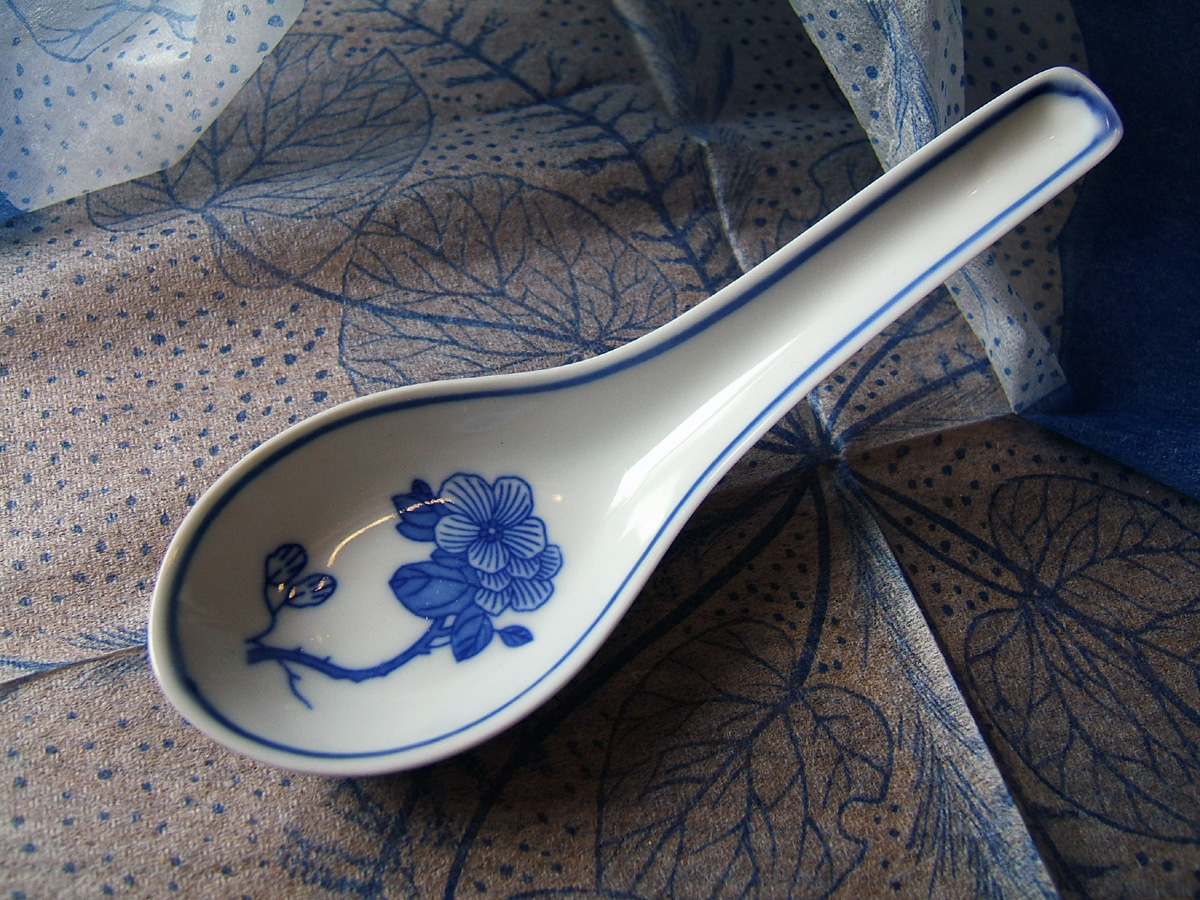
Chinese-type porcelain spoon

== Language and culture ==
Spoons are mentioned in the Bible (KJV): God in the Book of Exodus tells Moses to make for Tabernacle, among other things, spoons of gold.

The expression "born with a silver spoon in his mouth" (born into privilege) formed due to the mediaeval custom of gifting a "baptismal spoon" to a child; well-to-do families were able to afford spoons made of precious metals.

Spoons can be used as a musical instrument.

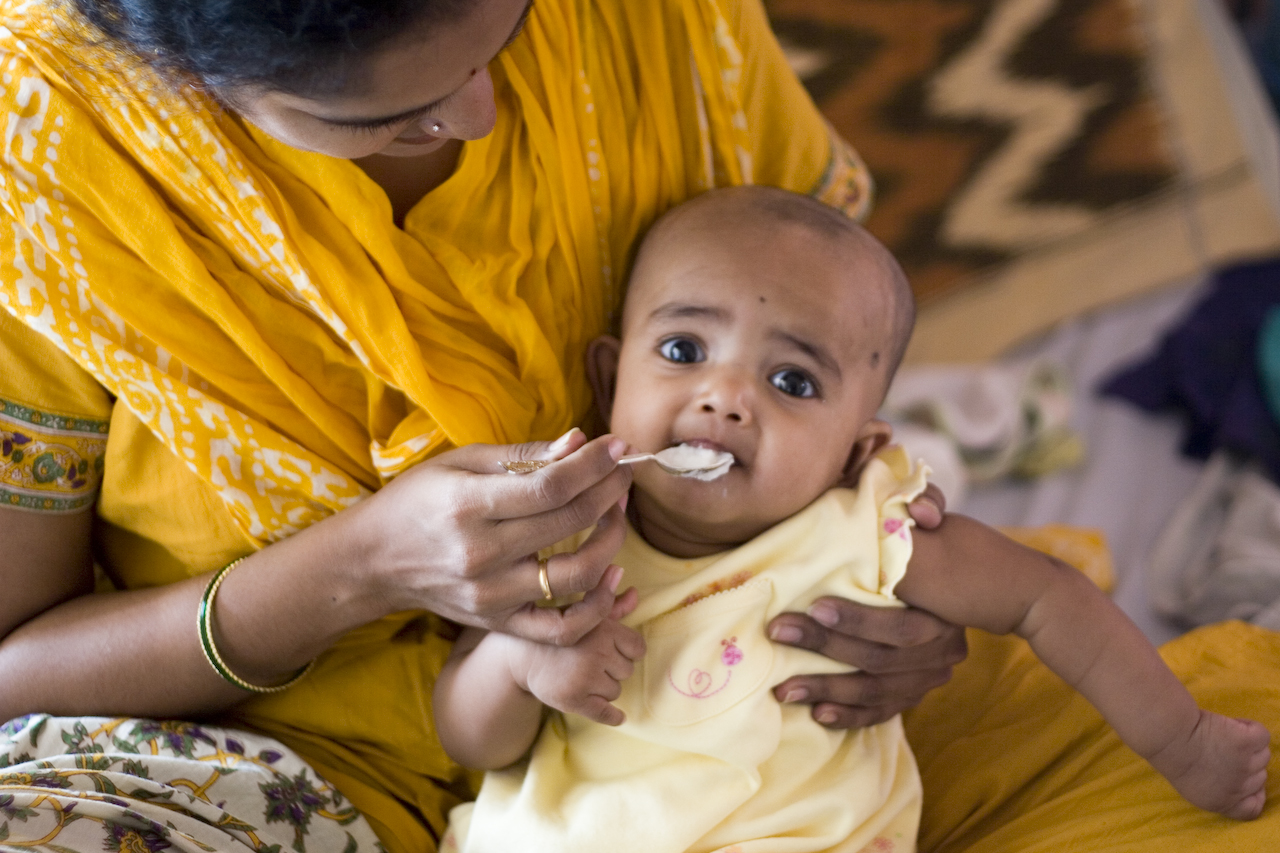
Spoon-feeding

To spoon-feed oneself or another can simply mean to feed by means of a spoon. Metaphorically, however, it often means to present something to a person or group so thoroughly or wholeheartedly as to preclude the need for independent thought, initiative or self-reliance on the part of the recipient; or to present information in a slanted version, with the intent to preclude questioning or revision. Someone who accepts passively what has been offered in this way is said to have been spoon-fed.

A spoonful is the amount of material a spoon contains or can contain. It is used as a standard unit of measure for volume in cooking, where it normally signifies a teaspoonful. It is abbreviated coch or cochl, from Latin: cochlearium, a small Roman spoon. "Teaspoonful" is often used in a similar way to describe the dosage for over the counter medicines. Dessert spoonful and tablespoonful may also be found in drink and food recipes. A teaspoon holds about 5 ml and a tablespoon about 15 ml.

A souvenir spoon generally exists solely as a decorative object commemorating an event, place, or special date.

== Manufacture ==
For machine-made spoons, the basic shape is cut out from a sheet of sterling silver, nickel silver alloy or stainless steel. The bowl is cross rolled between two pressurized rollers to produce a thinner section. The handle section is also rolled to produce the width required for the top end. The blank is then cropped to the required shape, and two dies are used to apply the pattern to the blank. The flash is then removed using a linisher, and the bowl is formed between two dies and bent.

The stages of the hand forging process

To make a spoon the traditional way by way of hand forging, a bar of silver is marked up to the correct proportions for the bowl and handle. It is then heated until red hot and held in tongs, and using the hammer and anvil, beaten into shape. The tip of the bar is pointed to form the tip of the bowl, then hammered to form the bowl. If a heel is to be added, a section down the centre is left thicker. The edges of the bowl and the tip of the spoon are left thicker as this is where most of the thickness is needed. The handle is then started and hammered out to length going from thick at the neck and gradually tapering down in thickness giving a balanced feel. During this process, the piece becomes very hard and has to be annealed several times, then worked again until the final shape is achieved.

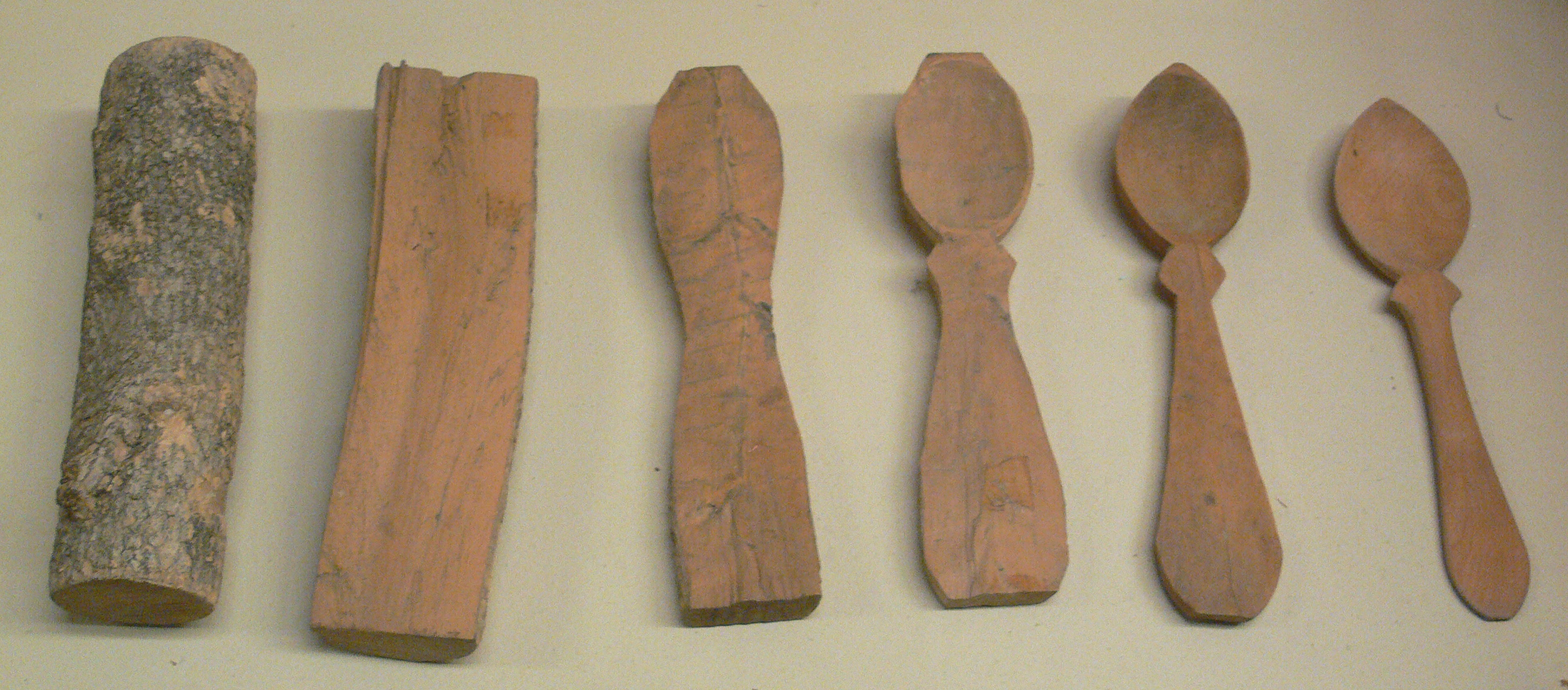
Wooden spoon carving steps

The bowl is filed to shape, often using a metal template. The bowl is then formed using a tin cake and spoon stake. The molten tin is poured around the spoon stake and left to harden. The handle is then bent down to 45 degrees, and the spoon is hammered into the tin using the spoon stake and a heavy hammer, to form the bowl. The bend in the handle is then adjusted to match the other spoons in the set so that it sits correctly on the table. The bowl is then filed level, a process called striking off. The surfaces are filed, first with a rough file to remove the fire stain from the surface, then with a smooth file. It is then buffed to remove any file marks and fire stain from inside the bowl and is polished to the desired finish.

== Derivatives ==
Both the spork and the sporf are derived from the spoon: they combine the bowl of the spoon with the tines of the fork and with both tines and the cutting edge of the knife, respectively.

== See also ==
- Cutlery
- List of types of spoons
- Montreal–Philippines cutlery controversy
- Scoop (utensil)
- Spoon bending
- Spoon theory
