= Liber di Tre Scricciur =

Medieval Italian epic poem

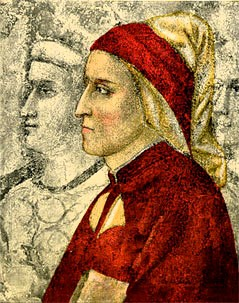
Engraving after the fresco in Bargello Chapel, painted by Giotto di Bondone in the 14th century.

The Liber di Tre Scricciur (pronounced [ˈliːber di ˈtrɛ skriˈtʃyːr]; originally spelled Libro dre Tre Scrigiure; "Book of the Three Scriptures") is a 1274 epic poem by Bonvesin da la Riva (c. 1240–1313) written in the Lombard language. The poem is an imaginative vision of the afterlife, divided into three books or "scriptures": one about Hell (Scricciura Negra, "Black Scripture"), one about the Passion of Christ (Scricciura Rossa, "Red Scripture") and one about Heaven (Scricciura Dorada, "Golden Scripture"). It is composed of quatrains with only one rhyme. With this poem Bonvesin takes a distinguished place among the precursors of Dante. The book is constructed with skill and symmetry, and deserves the attention of Dante scholars.

== See also ==
- Divine Comedy
