= Bonvesin da la Riva =

- Born: c. 1240 Milan
- Died: c. 1313 Milan
- Resting place: San Francesco Grande
- Occupation: Poet, teacher
- Language: Latin; Milanese dialect
- Period: High Middle Ages
- Genre: Poetry
- Notable works: Liber di Tre Scricciur
- Parents: Petrus de Laripa (father)

Bonvesin da la Riva (Lombard pronunciation: [bũʋeˈzĩː da la ˈriːʋa]; sometimes Italianized in spelling Bonvesino or Buonvicino; c. 1240 – c. 1313) was an Italian Medieval writer and poet. Bonvesin was a notable Lombard poet and writer, giving one of the first known examples of the written Lombard language. He is often described as the "father" of the Lombard language.

== Biography ==
A well-to-do Milanese lay member of the Ordine degli Umiliati (literally, "Order of the Humble Ones") Bonvesin was a teacher of (Latin) grammar in Legnano and in Milan. In 1291, he bought a house in the suburb of Porta Ticinese. There he dwelt and prospered, surviving two wives (Benghedice and Floramonte) and dying without issue between 1313 and 1315. In the interim, he had accumulated and preserved a comfortable capital, as we know from his two wills (of 1304 and 1313, respectively). In 1290, he loaned 200 lire (a denomination of much greater weight 700 years ago) to the Ospedale della Colombetta at a rate of 6 percent per annum to be received as an annuity by him or his wife, should she outlive him. In 1296, he was made a brother (confratello) of the Ospedale di San Giovanni di Gerusalemme at Porta Romana; between 1303 and 1305, he became a member of the College of Dons (i.e., supervisors without pay) for the Ospedale Nuovo, also known as di Donna Bona. At this time, he was advanced in years but still teaching, as one can tell from his bequest of books, classroom equipment, and accounts receivable to his favorite hospitals and their clerical supervisors in the 1304 will (his copy of Huguccio's Summa derivationum, a major reference source for scholars and writers of his time, gets special mention). By the time of his second and final will (January 5, 1313), in which he describes himself as "old" and "ailing" (senes and aeger), he had apparently retired from teaching and disposed of books and equipment, since there is no longer any mention of them. A document dated March 1315 speaks of Bonvesin as already dead for some time. It is most likely that he did not long survive the 1313 will. He was buried in the cloister of the church of St. Francis. The monument which a descendant dedicated to his memory during the fifteenth century disappeared by 1700.

== Works ==
Bonvesin de la Riva wrote several moral and didactic works, both in Latin and in the Milanese vernacular. All his Milanese writings, which are conventionally given Latin titles, are in verse, their exclusive metrical form being alexandrines in monorhymed four-line stanzas. Surviving manuscripts demonstrate that Bonvesin produced many works in the vernacular, in fact, about ten thousand verses' worth, distributed among twenty poems which belong to the earliest literary texts written in the dialect of Milan proper, though they represent, at the same time, the last flowering of Lombard religious poetry.

The most important is probably the Liber di Tre Scricciur (Book of the Three Scriptures), completed before 1274. Over 2,000 lines long and divided into three parts, it describes the torments of Hell, Christ's Passion, and the rewards of Paradise. There is no mention of Purgatory, a fact which has sometimes led to accusations of heresy. The work is tightly constructed and contains quite powerful depictions of the punishments of the sinners, which show a talent for grotesque, even fearsome realism. As the author of the Liber di Tre Scricciur Bonvesin has often been considered – together with Giacomino da Verona – as one of Dante's precursors. As has been said more than once, by the very fact that it includes a middle panel between Hell and Heaven, the "Book of the Three Scriptures" takes a significant step beyond the two-part format used by Giacomino in the Babilonia and Jerusalem and indeed adumbrates the scheme of the Commedia itself.

A similar talent emerges in the De elemosynis (On Almsgiving), an account of contemporary hospitals in Milan, containing some grim descriptions of patients and their illnesses. In fact, Bonvesin seems to have had a particular interest in the care of the sick, leaving money to hospitals in his wills of 1304 and 1313.

A rather more cheerful and engaging insight into contemporary society is afforded by the De quinquaginta curialitatibus ad mensam (Fifty courtesies at Table), which lists the fifty rules of good table manners (don't slurp from a spoon, don't dip your bread in a communal wine-cup, etc.).

Another picture of contemporary Milan is painted by the Latin De magnalibus urbis Mediolani (On the Marvels of Milan), written in the late spring of 1288, which differs from earlier descriptions in not focusing on saints and churches, but rather praises the city for its size and wealth, backing up its claims with extensive facts and figures. Bonvesin's De magnalibus urbis Mediolani, languished unknown in a single manuscript in the Biblioteca Nacional de España, Madrid, until 1894. Its eight chapters form a monument of civic pride typical of the Italian communes, written by a man in a position to offer an unrivalled statistical report of the city that he felt was exalted above all others, like the eagle among birds. In Milan, he counted the belltowers (120) and the portoni, massive front doors of houses (12,500), the city's lawyers (120), physicians (28), ordinary surgeons (at least 150), butchers (440) and communal trumpeters (6). His order, the Umiliati, served as a kind of civil service in Milan, collecting taxes and controlling the communal treasury, so he was in a position to know. His long inventory of the fruits and vegetables that Milanesi were eating served as a rare source of ordinary fare for the historian of cuisine.

Bonvesin's many religious works include a number of lives of saints and a series of vernacular contrasti—dialogues between, for example, the soul and the body, or the Devil and the Virgin Mary. He also composed allegorical contrasti. In the Disputatio mensium the months of the year rebel against their king, January, taking turns to boast of their qualities and benefits, whilst in the Disputatio rosae cum viola the most humble of flowers, the violet, puts forward a case for its superiority over the most magnificent, the rose.

== Works in English translation ==
- Select Poems. ed. and trans. P. S. Diehl and R. Stefanini. New York, Bern, and Frankfurt am Main: Peter Lang. 1987. ISBN 978-0820404271.

== Bibliography ==
- Debenedetti, Santorre (1930). "BONVESIN da la Riva". Enciclopedia Italiana. Rome: Istituto dell'Enciclopedia Italiana.
- Contini, Gianfranco, ed. (1937). Cinque volgari di Bonvesin Da La Riva. Modena: Società Tipografica Modenese.
- Ragni, Eugenio (1970). "Bonvesin da la Riva". Enciclopedia Dantesca. Rome: Istituto dell'Enciclopedia Italiana.
- Brevini, Franco (1984). Lo stile lombardo. La tradizione letteraria da Bonvesin da la Riva a Franco Loi. Lugano: Pantarei.
- Gragnolati, Manuele (2000). "From Decay to Splendor: Body and Pain in Bonvesin da la Riva's Book of the Three Scriptures". In Caroline Walker Bynum; Paul Freedman (eds.). Last Things: Death and the Apocalypse in the Middle Ages. Philadelphia: University of Pennsylvania Press. pp. 83–98. doi:10.9783/9780812208450.83. ISBN 978-0-8122-3512-8.
- Honess, Claire (2002). "Bonvesin de la Riva". The Oxford Companion to Italian Literature. Oxford: Oxford University Press.
- Stefanini, Ruggero (2004). "Bonvesin da la Riva". In Kleinhenz, Christopher (ed.). Medieval Italy. An Encyclopedia. Taylor & Francis. pp. 145–147. ISBN 978-1135948801.
- Gragnolati, Manuele (2006). "Bonvesin da la Riva". In Marrone, Gaetana (ed.). Encyclopedia of Italian Literary Studies. Routledge. pp. 289–292. ISBN 9781135455309.
- Katherine L. Jansen; Joanna Drell; Frances Andrews, eds. (2009). "Bonvesin della Riva on Milan and Its Contado (1288) translated from Latin by Frances Andrews". Medieval Italy: Texts in Translation. Philadelphia: University of Pennsylvania Press. pp. 16–19. doi:10.9783/9780812206067.16. ISBN 978-0-8122-4164-8.
- Raymund Wilhelm; Stephen Dörr, eds. (2009). Bonvesin da la Riva – Poesia, lingua e storia a Milano nel tardo Medioevo. Atti della giornata di studio, Heidelberg, 29 giugno 2006. Heidelberg: Universitätsverlag Winter. doi:10.9783/9780812206067.16. ISBN 978-3825355838.
