= Table manners =

Rules of etiquette used while eating

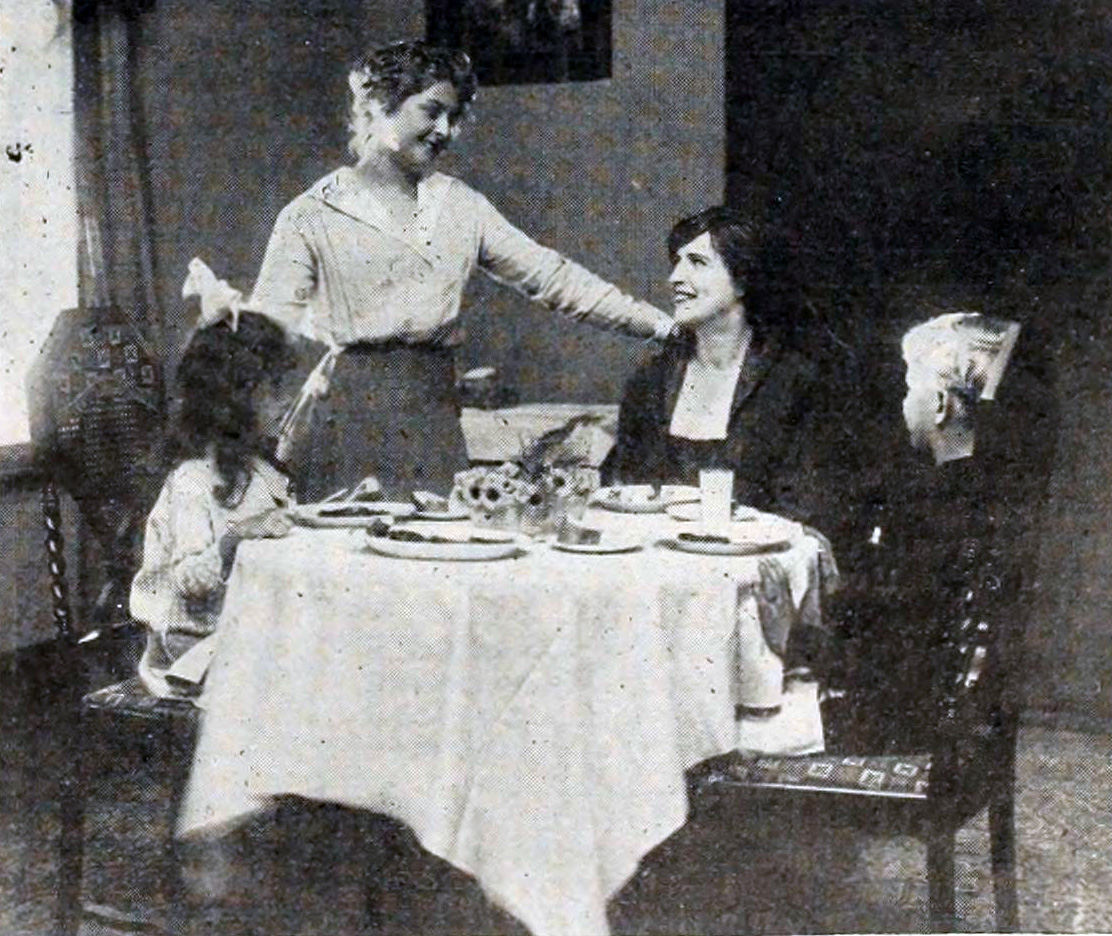
Table Manners in the Nursery, from a 1916 magazine article from the United States

Table manners are the social customs or rituals used while eating and drinking in a group setting. While different cultures have established different eating rituals, in general the rules pursue similar goals, with focus on cleanliness, consideration for other diners, and the unity of the group sharing the meal. Each gathering may vary in how strictly these customs are insisted upon.

== Importance ==
Sharing food in company of others satisfies the dual purposes of sustenance and community. Human brains are sensitive to the deviations from the routine, so in order to "fit in", every person is trained, from a very early age (babies start learning the meal schedule and chewing during weaning), to obey the table manners of a particular group.

Shared meals are often used to celebrate or commiserate significant life events such as weddings, birthdays, personal achievements and funerals. The established patterns of table manners helps people to navigate these sometimes stressful occasions.

Shared meals can assist to reinforce a social group and maintain its cohesiveness: in Victorian times manners were "the barrier which society draws around itself, a shield against the intrusion of the impertinent, the improper, and the vulgar." Eating habits can be used as class markers, for instance this role was played by caviar, champagne, goat cheese for upper classes, as notes by the Classical Antiquity (cf. works by Mozi for the ancient Chinese perspective).

== Origins ==
The need for eating − and the desirability of sharing of food − lies at the root of human behavior; thus, table manners have been argued to be as old as the humanity itself, and are present in any modern society.

The eating rituals might be quite artificial, although their evolution is mostly guided by practical reasons for most of them, including neatness, cleanliness, and noiselessness. For example, eating spaghetti with bare hands, not unusual in the 19th-century Italy, is unacceptable nowadays. Not just the meals themselves, but their schedule (like breakfast–lunch–dinner sequence with a typical prohibition of snacking in between) are tightly controlled, probably stemming from the meals held when the ancient hunters and gatherers were bringing food to share from their outings.

=== Education ===
Notable role in spreading the table manners was played by the court of Louis XIV (and its European imitators), where gaining the power required staying close to the king himself, the feat requiring, among other skills, good table manners in order not to offend other people. When the bourgeois gained access to court, etiquette books were produced to bring them up to speed, like Antoine de Courtin's Nouveau traité de la civilité qui se pratique en France parmi les honnestes gens by ("The New Treatise of the Civility Which Is Practised in France Among Honest People", 1672). The Church of France started teaching good manners in its schools and producing textbooks on the subject.

After the 16th century, the spread of table manners was helped by the introduction of the institution of "childhood", where the introduction of children to the adult world was delayed and substituted by a crash course in civility that includes teaching of table manners starting at an early age.

== Evolution ==
Table manners evolve with time, but quite slowly. One of the purposes of any ritual is conservation, so the evolution of manners happens gradually and against unwillingness of most participants. The new habits are usually invented by the elites, and it takes decades and occasionally centuries before the widespread acceptance. For example, the introduction of forks into the Western etiquette took 800 years, from the first mention as a novelty in the 11th century document to the universal adoption as an affordable attribute of the civilized behavior.

In the Western world, a major change occurred during the Renaissance, when the term "courtesy" (implying the noblemen mingling in the court) was changed to "civility", applying to everyone. In the process, a public display of bodily functions, from belching to spitting − and even mentioning them − became impolite. "Walls" were put around fellow eaters who started to use their own utensils, avoided touching even their own food by fingers, and adopted body postures minimizing brushes against their neighbors.

== Critique and humor ==
Early books on table manners mostly concentrated on the actions to avoid, sometimes providing extremely rude behaviour as examples of bad manners. In the 16th-century Germany, multiple humorous books on manner have been printed that used florid language to suggest ridiculous acts: "if you want to improve your health, increase your standing in the community, and do yourself justice, you really must grab what you want off the table". Jonathan Swift in his Directions to Servants suggests that the cook uses bare hands to do everything in order to preserve his master's utensils.

Erasmus declared the external decorum to be the "crassest part" of philosophy. He still published a book, On Civility in Children (1530), that was reprinted many times.

== Enforcement ==
For those who fail to behave appropriately, society's primary punishment is social exclusion, a rejection that is felt perhaps most profoundly around the dining table.

Bourgeoisie were notable for stricter adherence to the table manners than nobility, even in the absence of external constraints, such as a king. Their self-imposed restrictions were driven by fear of losing a lot in case of a blunder that turned out to be a better motivator than the obedience and self-interest of courtiers. Erasmus in his book for children suggests, "Grasping the bread in the palm of the hand and breaking it with the fingertips is an affected practice which should be left to certain courtiers. You should cut it properly with your knife..." (the modern handling of bread rolls in the West keeps the tradition of the court).

== Europe ==
Traditionally in European Countries, the host or hostess takes the first bite unless the host invites others to start. The host begins after all food for that course has been served and everyone is seated. In religious households or formal institutions, a family meal may commence with saying grace, or at dinner parties the guests might begin the meal by offering some favorable comments on the food and thanks to the host. In a group dining situation it is considered impolite to begin eating before all the group have been served their food and are ready to start.

Napkins should be placed on the lap and not tucked into clothing. Napkins are primarily for wiping one's mouth and should be placed unfolded on the seat of one's chair should one need to leave the table during the meal, or placed unfolded on the table when the meal is finished.

The fork is held with the left hand and the knife held with the right. The fork is held generally with the tines down, using the knife to cut food or help guide food on to the fork. When no knife is being used, the fork can be held with the tines up. With the tines up, the fork balances on the side of the index finger, held in place with the thumb and index finger. The fork shall not be held like a shovel, with all fingers wrapped around the base. A single mouthful of food should be lifted on the fork and one should not chew or bite food from the fork. The knife should be held with the base into the palm of the hand, not like a pen with the base resting between the thumb and forefinger. The knife must never enter the mouth or be licked. When eating soup, the soup spoon is held in the right hand and the bowl tipped away from the diner, scooping the soup in outward movements. The soup spoon need not be put entirely into the mouth, and soup should be sipped from the side of the spoon, not the end. Food should be chewed with the mouth closed. Talking with food in one's mouth is seen as very rude. Licking one's fingers and eating too slowly or too quickly can also be considered impolite as it can disrupt the flow of the meal for the group.

Food should always be tasted before salt and pepper are added. Applying condiments or seasoning before the food is tasted can be construed as a lack of faith in the cook's ability to appropriately season the meal during cooking.

Butter should be cut, not scraped, from the butter dish using a butter knife or side plate knife and put onto a side plate, not spread directly on to the bread. This prevents the butter in the dish from gathering bread crumbs as it is passed around. Bread rolls should be torn with the hands into mouth-sized pieces and buttered individually, from the butter placed on the side plate, using a knife. As with butter, cheese should be cut and placed on the plate before eating.

When eating with other people, pouring one's own drink is acceptable, but it is more polite to offer to pour drinks to the people sitting on either side. Wine bottles can be removed from an ice bucket to indicate they are empty, rather than turned upside down.

It is impolite to reach over someone's plate to pick up food or other items. Diners should always ask for items to be passed along the table to them. In the same vein, diners who are not themselves using the item should pass those items directly to the person who asked, or to someone else who can pass them along to the person. It is also seen as rude to slurp food, eat noisily or make noise with cutlery.

A diner should attempt to sit upright, and keep elbows as off the table.

When one has finished eating, regardless of whether the plate is empty or not, this can be communicated to others by placing the knife and fork together on the plate at either the 6 o'clock position (facing upwards), or the 4 o'clock position (facing towards approximately 10 o'clock). The fork tines should face upwards. The napkin, if there is one, should be folded (not too neatly, so it's obvious that it was used) to the left of the plate. This is particularly customary in restaurants, where it is understood as a cue by waiters that one's plate can be collected.

At family meals, children are often expected to ask permission to leave the table at the end of the meal, while adults remain talking, this varies extensively by country, culture and family.

Mobile phones may be left on silent and kept away with exceptions for commitments to parenting and on-call work. If a call needs to be answered or returned, the diner may excuse themselves and take the call out of ear-shot.

== North America ==
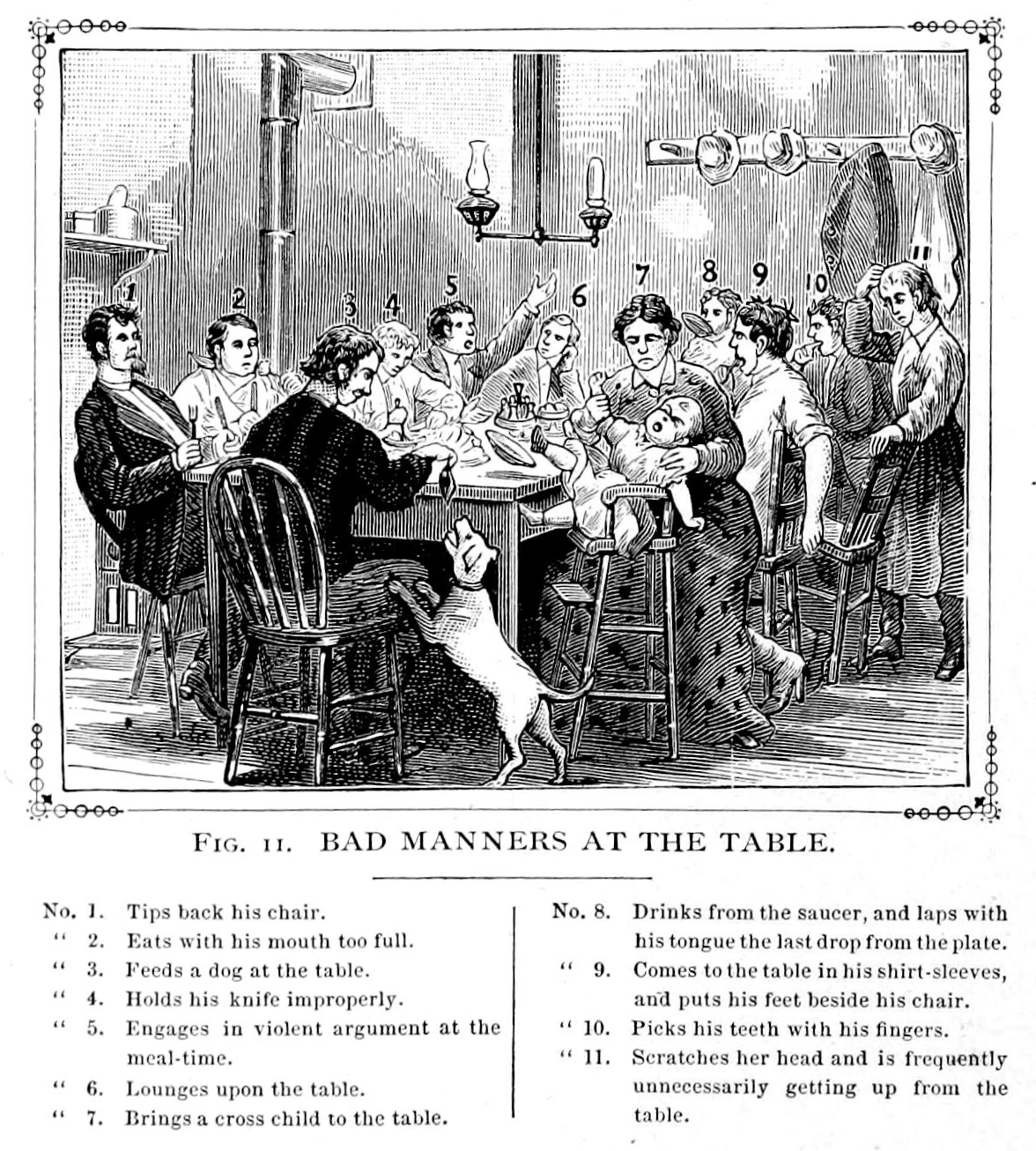
Illustration of bad table manners in Hill's Manual of Social Business Forms (1879)

Modern etiquette provides the smallest numbers and types of utensils necessary for dining. Only utensils which are to be used for the planned meal should be set. Even if needed, hosts should not have more than three utensils on either side of the plate before a meal. If extra utensils are needed, they may be brought to the table along with later courses.

A tablecloth extending 10–15 inches past the edge of the table may be used for formal dinners, while placemats may be used for breakfast, lunch, and informal suppers. Candlesticks, even if not lit, should not be on the table while dining during daylight hours. At some restaurants, women may be asked for their orders before men.

Men's and unisex hats should never be worn at the table if the meal takes place indoors. Ladies' hats may be worn during the day, and outdoors.

Phones and other distracting items should not be used at the dining table. Reading at a table is permitted only at breakfast, unless the diner is alone. Urgent matters should be handled, after excusing oneself, by stepping away from the table.

If food must be removed from the mouth for some reason—a pit, bone, or gristle—the rule of thumb, according to Emily Post, is that it comes out the same way it went in. For example, if olives are eaten by hand, the pit may be removed by hand. If an olive in a salad is eaten with a fork, the pit should be deposited back onto the fork inside one's mouth, and then placed onto a plate. The same applies to any small bone or piece of gristle in food. A diner should never spit things into a napkin, certainly not a cloth napkin. Since the napkin is always laid in the lap and brought up only to wipe one's mouth, hidden food may be accidentally dropped into the lap or onto the host's floor. Food that is simply disliked should be swallowed.

When eating soup or other food served with bowl and spoons, the spoon is always pushed away from oneself, rather than being drawn toward oneself. Food is never slurped. This stems from aristocratic views that drawing the spoon toward oneself portrayed negative images of either hunger or gluttony.

The fork may be used in the American style (in the left hand while cutting and in the right hand to pick up food) or the European Continental style (fork always in the left hand). (See Fork etiquette) The napkin should be left on the seat of a chair only when leaving temporarily. Upon leaving the table at the end of a meal, the napkin is placed loosely on the table to the left of the plate. The habit of leaving the crumpled napkin on the plate upon completion is seen as uncouth and inconsiderate.

== India ==
In formal settings, the host asks the guests to start the meal. Generally, one should not leave the table before the host or the eldest person finishes his or her food. It is also considered impolite to leave the table without asking for the host's or the elder's permission. Normally whoever finishes eating first will wait for others and after everybody is finished all leave the table.

In a traditional Indian meal setup, the plate is normally served with small quantities of all the dishes.

The custom of dining is to use the right hand when eating or receiving food. It is inappropriate to touch any communal utensils by the hand used for eating. If the right hand is used for eating, then the left hand should be used for serving oneself from common utensils. Hand washing, both before sitting at a table and after eating, is important.

Small amounts of food are taken at a time, ensuring that food is not wasted. It is considered important to finish each item on the plate out of respect for the food being served. Traditionally, food should be eaten as it is served, without asking for salt or pepper. It is however, now acceptable to express a personal preference for salt or pepper and to ask for it.

Distorting or playing with food is unacceptable. Eating at a moderate pace is important, as eating too slowly may imply a dislike of the food and eating too quickly is considered rude. Generally, it is acceptable to burp, slurp while at the table. Staring at another diner's plate is also considered rude. It is inappropriate to make sounds while chewing. Certain Indian food items can create sounds, so it is important to close the mouth and chew at a moderate pace.

At the dining table, attention must be paid to specific behaviors that may indicate distraction or rudeness. Answering phone calls, sending messages and using inappropriate language are considered inappropriate while dining and while elders are present.

== China ==
Seating and serving customs play important roles in Chinese dining etiquette. For example, the diners should not sit down or begin to eat before the host (or guest of honor) has done so. When everyone is seated, the host offers to pour tea, beginning with the cup of the eldest person. The youngest person is served last as a gesture of respect for the elders.

Communal utensils (chopsticks and spoons) are used to bring food from communal dishes to an individual's own bowl (or plate). It is considered rude and unhygienic for a diner to use his or her own chopsticks to pick up food from communal bowls and plates when such utensils are present. Other potentially rude behaviors with chopsticks include playing with them, separating them in any way (such as holding one in each hand) or piercing food with them. Standing chopsticks upright is considered especially rude, evoking images of incense or 'joss' sticks used ceremoniously at funerals. A rice bowl may be lifted with one hand to scoop rice into the mouth with chopsticks. It is also considered rude to look for a piece one would prefer on the plate instead of picking up the piece that is closest to the diner as symbol of fairness and sharing to the others.

The last piece of food on a communal dish is not served to oneself without asking for permission. When offered the last bit of food, it is considered rude to refuse the offer. It is considered virtuous for diners to not leave any bit of food on their plates or bowls. Condiments, such as soy sauce or duck sauce, may not be routinely provided at high-quality restaurants. The assumption is that perfectly prepared food needs no condiments and the quality of the food can be best appreciated.

== Korea ==
In formal settings, a meal is commenced when the eldest or most senior diner at the table partakes of any of the foods on the table. Before partaking, intention to enjoy their meal should be expressed. Similarly, satisfaction or enjoyment of that meal should be expressed at its completion. On occasion, there are some dishes which require additional cooking or serving at the table. In this case, the youngest or lowest-ranked adult diner should perform this task. When serving, diners are served food and drink in descending order starting with the eldest or highest-ranked diner to the youngest or lowest-ranked.

Usually, diners will have a bowl of soup on the right with a bowl of rice to its left. Alternatively, soup may be served in a single large communal pot to be consumed directly or ladled into individual bowls. Dining utensils will include a pair of chopsticks and a spoon. Common chopstick etiquette should be followed, but rice is generally eaten with the spoon instead of chopsticks. Often some form of protein (meat, poultry, fish) will be served as a main course and placed at the center of the table within reach of the diners. Banchan will also be distributed throughout the table. If eaten with spoon, banchan is placed on the spoonful of rice before entering the mouth. With chopsticks, however, it is fed to the mouth directly. The last piece of food on a communal dish should not be served to oneself without first asking for permission, but, if offered the last bit of food in the communal dish, it is considered rude to refuse the offer. Bowls of rice or soup should not be picked up off the table while dining, an exception being made for large bowls of Korean noodle soup. Slurping while eating noodles and soup is generally acceptable. It is not uncommon to chew with the mouth open.

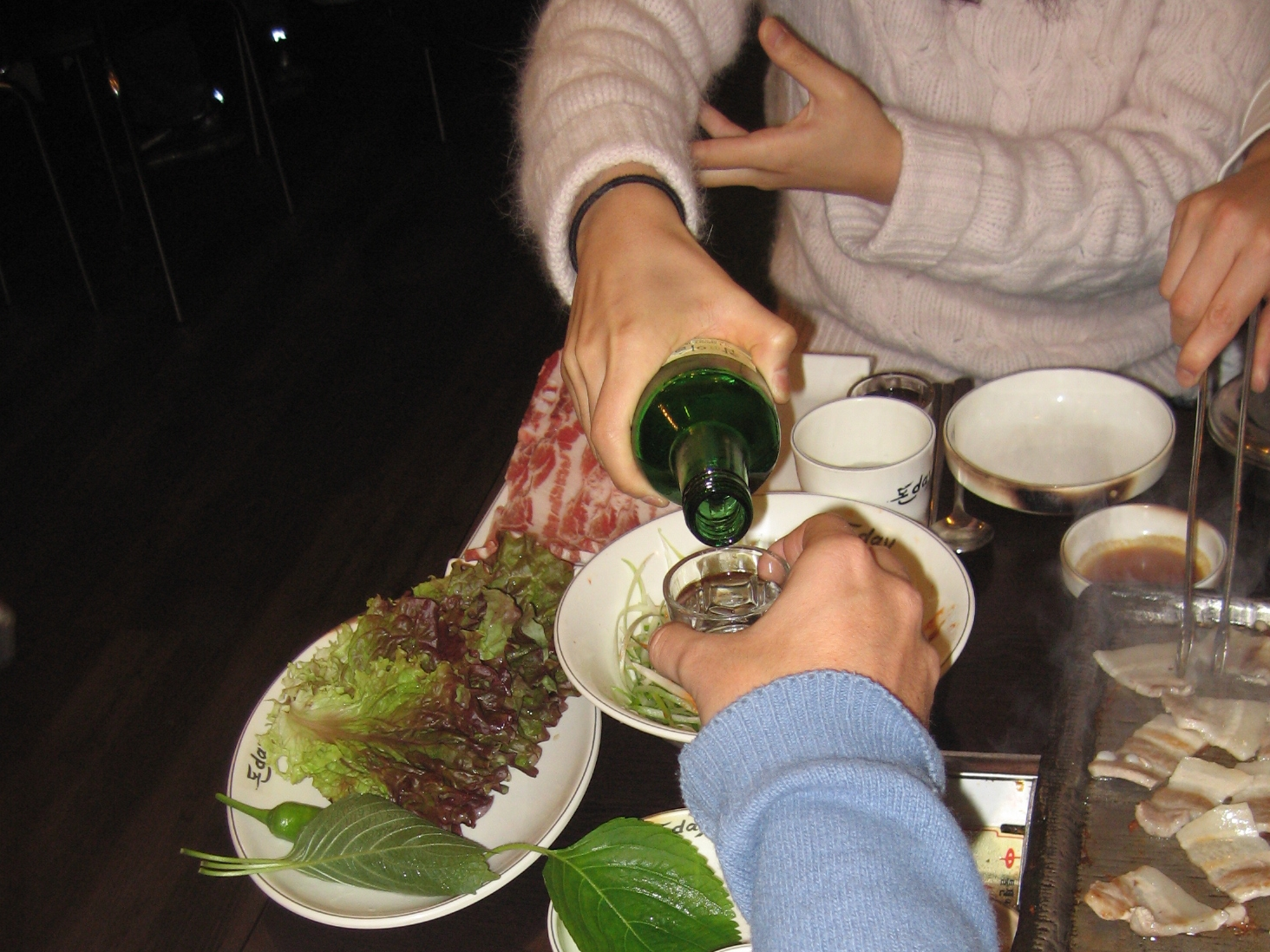
When serving alcohol in Korea, the bottle should be held with the right hand, supported lightly with the left hand.

If alcohol is served with the meal, it is common practice that when alcohol is first served for the eldest or highest-ranked diner to make a toast and for diners to clink their glasses together before drinking. The clinking of glasses together is often done throughout the meal. A host should never serve alcohol to themselves. Likewise, it is considered rude to drink alone. Instead, keep pace with other diners and both serve and be served the alcohol. Alcohol should always be served to older and higher-ranked diners with both hands, and younger or lower-ranked diners may turn their face away from other diners when drinking the alcohol.

== See also ==
- Cultural competence
- Eating utensil etiquette
- Montreal–Philippines cutlery controversy

== Sources ==
- Anderson, E. N. (December 31, 2020). "Me, Myself, and the Others: Food as Social Marker". Everyone Eats. New York University Press. pp. 171–187. doi:10.18574/nyu/9780814785768.003.0014. ISBN 978-0-8147-8576-8.
- Visser, Margaret (1991). The Rituals Of Dinner: the origins, evolution, eccentricities, and meaning of table manners (1st ed.). Harper Collins.
