= 3-hydroxypalmitoyl-(acyl-carrier-protein) dehydratase =

Class of enzymes

3-hydroxypalmitoyl-[acyl-carrier-protein] dehydratase

Identifiers
- EC no.: 4.2.1.61
- CAS no.: 9030-86-8

Databases
- IntEnz: IntEnz view
- BRENDA: BRENDA entry
- ExPASy: NiceZyme view
- KEGG: KEGG entry
- MetaCyc: metabolic pathway
- PRIAM: profile
- PDB structures: RCSB PDB PDBe PDBsum
- Gene Ontology: AmiGO / QuickGO
Search
- PMC: articles
- PubMed: articles
- NCBI: proteins

In enzymology, a 3-hydroxypalmitoyl-[acyl-carrier-protein] dehydratase (EC 4.2.1.61) is an enzyme that catalyzes the chemical reaction

(3R)-3-hydroxypalmitoyl-[acyl-carrier-protein] $\rightleftharpoons$ hexadec-2-enoyl-[acyl-carrier-protein] + H_{2}O

Hence, this enzyme has one substrate, [[(3R)-3-hydroxypalmitoyl-[acyl-carrier-protein]]], and two products, [[hexadec-2-enoyl-[acyl-carrier-protein]]] and H_{2}O.

This enzyme belongs to the family of lyases, specifically the hydro-lyases, which cleave carbon-oxygen bonds. The systematic name of this enzyme class is (3R)-3-hydroxypalmitoyl-[acyl-carrier-protein] hydro-lyase (hexadec-2-enoyl-[acyl-carrier protein]-forming). Other names in common use include D-3-hydroxypalmitoyl-[acyl-carrier-protein] dehydratase, beta-hydroxypalmitoyl-acyl carrier protein dehydrase, beta-hydroxypalmitoyl thioester dehydratase, beta-hydroxypalmityl-ACP dehydrase, and (3R)-3-hydroxypalmitoyl-[acyl-carrier-protein] hydro-lyase. This enzyme participates in fatty acid biosynthesis.

== Structural studies ==
As of late 2007, only one structure has been solved for this class of enzymes, with the PDB accession code 2PFF.
