= Guido Faba =

Notary, scribe and teacher of rhetoric from Bologna

Guido going around the wheel of fortune in an illustration for his Rota nova (Oxford, New College Library, MS 255, fol. 1r). At the top, he sits throned and receiving wings from the Archangel Michael. The allegorical meaning of the illustration is found in the autobiographical preface.

Guido Faba or Fava (c. 1190 – c. 1245) was a notary, scribe and teacher of rhetoric from Bologna. At least eleven works are attributed to him, all on rhetoric, mainly the ars dictaminis (art of letter writing). Although he wrote mainly in Latin, two of his works contain advice for using vernacular Italian in formal settings.

== Life ==
Guido included a short autobiography of himself in the preface to his Rota nova in 1225–1226. It is the most important source for his life.

Guido was born in Bologna in or shortly before 1190. His father's name was Niccolò. In some manuscripts of his work, he is called Guido de Lombardia. According to his own account, he received the nickname Faba as a child "because of the effect of his antics". It comes from the Latin expression fabas dicere, to be a jokester. It has, however, been suggested that he was related to Aliprando Faba, to whom he dedicated his Summa dictaminis.

By 1210, Guido had a master's degree. According to his autobiographical account, he took a two-year hiatus from his original studies at the University of Bologna:

The malice of the adversary of old began to envy Guido's future wisdom and the service he would perform for humanity to such an extent that he had to abandon his literary studies in which he had achieved great proficiency, and descend to learning, in addition, the blacksmith's art. In this he had advanced for two years when he was recalled by three miracles from God.

Ernst Kantorowicz interprets this passage as an allegory describing how Guido quit the humanities (literary studies or humanistic letter) to study law for two years before returning to his former studies. This probably took place in 1211–1213. For financial reasons, he became a notary, probably around 1216. He appears as a notary with the Bolognese delegation to the papal legate Ugo da Ostia at Viterbo in 1219–1220. In his autobiography, he describes his notarial turn allegorically as being "handed over to the solace of the tanners". He further claims that he served "for two years as the scribe of the bishop of Bologna", and this is confirmed by documents for the period 1221–1222 under Bishop Enrico della Fratta.

Disappointed, according to his account, by the worldliness of the bishop's court, Guido returned to scholarly practice around 1223. Before 1225–1226, he became a teacher of rhetoric attached to the chapel of San Michele in Mercato di Mezzo, which he reorganized. At some point before 1227, Guido seems to have visited Rome and also served as a papal judge delegate. He took holy orders and in his works describes himself as a master (magister), chaplain (cappellanus), canon (canonicus), priest (sacerdos) and presbyter of San Michele.

Augusto Gaudenzi proposed, on the basis of Guido's Parlamenta et epistole, that Guido relocated to Siena after 1239 for political reasons, being a Ghibelline. Guido died after 1243. Gaudenzi proposed that he died between 1245 and 1250, because in a manuscript from that period there is an obelus beside his name.

== Works ==
=== Dictaminal canon ===
The central canon of Guido's writings consists of six Latin works, all on rhetoric, often transmitted together.

- Summa dictaminis, written in 1228–1229 and dedicated to Aliprando Faba, is Guido's major theoretical work. An epitome is known under the title Summula de alto stilo, propter rudes et non vitiosos. The section listing 104 biblical sentences for use in exordia (introductions) was sometimes copied separately under the titles De sapientia Salomonis e De proverbiis Salomonis.
- Dictamina rhetorica, written around 1226–1228, is a collection of 220 model letters for writing to everybody from a student to the emperor. It was highly influential.
- Exordia, sometimes erroneously called Proverbia inter amicos et socios, is a collection of 330 suggested opening sentences for letters. It is divided into nine sections. In some manuscripts, each opening is given a corresponding continuatio, a sentence to connect the exordium (introduction) to the narratio (body). In other manuscript, the continuationes are separate. An Italian version of the Exordia is also known.
- Arenge is a collection of model speeches for use by statesmen, judges, ambassadors and churchmen. It was written before 1240–1241, when a revised version with six additional long speeches appeared. An Italian version is also known.
- Summa de vitiis et virtutibus (also Tractatus de vitiis et virtutibus or Exordia de vitiis et virtutibus), written after the Exordia, is a collection of exordia and continuationes organized by the seven virtues and seven deadly sins. Each virtue or sin has six exordia. An Italian version of the Summa is known.
- Petitiones is a collection of model letters for supplications to the pope. Its date is uncertain. It is known from ten manuscripts.

=== Minor and vernacular works ===
Guido's other works all circulated much less widely, but the Gemma and Parlamenta are important in the history of the Italian language.

- Gemma purpurea, written in Latin between 1239 and 1248, is a guide to letter writing, including technical and stylistic aspects and terms of address. It includes model exordia in both Latin and vernacular Italian, making it the earliest evidence for formal letter writing in the vernacular in Italy. There are nine complete manuscripts and two that omit the vernacular examples.
- Parlamenta et epistole, written around 1242–1243 and generally considered Guido's last work, is another work that mixes Latin and the vernacular. It contains 26 model vernacular speeches (parlamenta), each accompanied by up to three Latin letters (epistole) for a total of 95 rhetorical models. Each chapter is designed for a given situation (e.g., a father to his son at university). The three Latin letters represent three different levels of "rhetorical complexity". The complete work is found in three manuscripts. In a concession to popular taste, Guido included one exchange of letters between Lent and Carnival—a popular allegorical genre at the time. It is found in one other manuscript.
- Epistole, written in 1239–1241, is a collection of Latin model letters preserved in a single manuscript.
- Libelli ecclesiastici, like the Petitiones, is a collection of model petition letters on ecclesiastical topics. It was written between 1226 and 1234.

In addition, an anonymous Proverbia, a collection of Latin proverbs in eighteen thematic chapters, has been attributed to Guido on the basis of its structure and the sole manuscript that preserves its, in which it immediately follows a copy of Guido's Arenge. Its date is uncertain.

=== Rota nova and related works ===
Rota nova ('New Wheel'), written around 1225–1226 and preserved complete in a single manuscript (partially in three others), is an introductory Latin text on the art of letter writing. The long preface contains a short autobiography in the third person. The main body is divided in two sections, one on errors to avoid and the other on rules to follow. The title, a play on Boncompagno's Rota veneris ('Old Wheel'), refers to the wheel of fortune. Guido explains:

It deserves to be called 'The New Wheel,' because, just as the status of anyone goes through many changes with the advent of something new, so through the aforesaid mutation Guido ascended from a lower to a higher position. And sitting enthroned in the seat of the wheel, he holds in his right hand two wings, which he received from the archangel [San Michele]. In one of these wings the vices of all letter writing are cut away, and in the other wing are contained the rules which constitute the knowledge of dictamen and of the ornate style ...

The Rota nova probably represents the new curriculum Guido introduced at San Michele. The two parts of the text are called ala prima (first wing) and ala secunda (second wing). Each is introduced by a illustration.

Several short works by Guido are found only in Oxford, New College Library, MS 255, the same manuscript containing the complete text of the Rota nova. They are "supporting texts", but have been treated as part of the Rota nove by the manuscript's editors.

- Littere stili secularis
- Littere prosaici dictaminis stili ecclesiastici
- Littera quam magister Guido Sancti Michaelis Bononie misit scolaribus in suo principio, et lecta fuit per omnes scolas
- Invectiva magistri contra scolares malitiosos et tenaces
- Littera carnisprivii contra quadragesimam adversariam suam, a letter from Carnival to his adversary Lent
- Invectiva quadragesime contra carnisprivium inimicum suum, a letter from Lent to his enemy Carnival

== Bibliography ==
=== Editions ===
- Guido Faba (2000). Campbell, Alphonsus P.; Pini, Virgilio (eds.). Magistri Guidonis Fabe Rota nova. Istituto per la storia dell'Università di Bologna.
- Guido Faba (2022). Vescovo, Michele (ed.). Gemma purpurea. Sismel.

=== Secondary literature ===
- Bausi, Francesco (1995). "Fava, Guido". Dizionario Biografico degli Italiani (in Italian). Vol. 45: Farinacci–Fedrigo. Rome: Institute of the Italian Encyclopaedia. ISBN 978-88-12-00032-6.
- Cartlidge, Neil (2004). "The Battle of Shrovetide: Carnival against Lent as a Leitmotif in Late Medieval Culture". Viator. 35: 517–542. doi:10.1484/j.viator.2.300208.
- Copeland, Rita (2009). "Medieval Intellectual Biography: The Case of Guido Faba". In Andrew Galloway; R. F. Yeager (eds.). Through A Classical Eye: Transcultural and Transhistorical Visions in Medieval English, Italian, and Latin Literature in Honour of Winthrop Wetherbee. University of Toronto Press.
- Copeland, Rita; Sluiter, Ineke, eds. (2012). "Guido Faba, Preface to the Rota nova, ca. 1225". Medieval Grammar and Rhetoric: Language Arts and Literary Theory, AD 300–1475. Oxford University Press. pp. 699–705.
- Kantorowicz, Ernst (1941). "An 'Autobiography' of Guido Faba". Mediaeval and Renaissance Studies. 1: 253–280.
- Murphy, James Jerome (1974). Rhetoric in the Middle Ages: A History of Thetorical Theory from Saint Augustine to the Renaissance. University of California Press.
- Raccagni, Gianluca (2013). "The Teaching of Rhetoric and the Magna Carta of the Lombard Cities: The Peace of Constance, the Empire and the Papacy in the Works of Guido Faba and His Leading Contemporary Colleagues". Journal of Medieval History. 39 (1): 61–79.
- Usher, Jonathan (2002). "Guido Fava". In Peter Hainsworth; David Robey (eds.). The Oxford Companion to Italian Literature. Oxford University Press.
