= Old Romagnol =

Language spoken from the 16th to 19th centuries in Romagna

- rumagnol
- Region: Romagna
- Era: 16th–19th centuries; developed into Romagnol by the 20th century
- Language family: Indo-European: Italic; Latino-Faliscan; Romance; Italo-Western; Western Romance; Gallo-Romance; Gallo-Italic; Emilian–Romagnol; Old Romagnol
- Early forms: Latin: Proto-Romance
- Writing system: Latin

Language codes
- ISO 639-3: –

Old Romagnol is the earliest recorded form of the Romagnol language, spoken in the Romagna part of the Emilia-Romagna region in Italy, and San Marino. It was the form of Romagnol spoken around the early modern period.

Belonging to the Gallo-Italic languages, it was related to most of the languages of Northern Italy, such as Lombard, Piedmontese, and Ligurian. It developed from Vulgar Latin, just like all other Romance languages. In the 20th century, Romagnol had started to flourish, marking the end of the Old Romagnol era.

== History ==
Just like all other Romance languages, Old Romagnol developed out of Vulgar Latin. Its usage covered a period of three centuries.

While there was several mentions of Romagnol in medieval times, such as in Dante Alighieri's De vulgari eloquentia, the first texts in Romagnol appeared around the end of the Italian Renaissance, in the 16th century, when Romagnol had fully developed into separate dialect.

The first literary work in Romagnol, "sonetto romagnolo" by Bernardino Gatti was printed in 1502 in Ravenna.

The first Romagnol dictionary was published in 1840, and was written by Antonio Morri. Morri also translated the Gospel of Matthew, which was published in 1865 by Louis Lucien Bonaparte.

== Sample text ==
Below is the Lord's Prayer, from a translation of the Gospel of Matthew.

Pêdar nòstar, ché t së in zil: séja santifichê é tu nöm
Végna é tu régn. Séja fàtt lá tu vuluntê, täṅt in zil, quänt in tèrra.
Dàzz incö é päṅ pár nòstar sustentaméṅt.
É pàssa söra á i nóstar dèbit, cöm äṅca nojëtar passéṅ söra á quíi di nóstar debitúr.
É nó z'indúr in tentaziöṅ. Má gvërdaz dá ögni mêl, é cussí séja.

Translation:

Our Father in heaven, hallowed be your name,
your kingdom come, your will be done, on earth as it is in heaven.
Give us today our daily bread.
And forgive us our debts, as we also have forgiven our debtors.
And lead us not into temptation, but deliver us from the evil one
