= Lake Sirino =

Lake in Basilicata, Italy

- Lago Sirino (Italian)
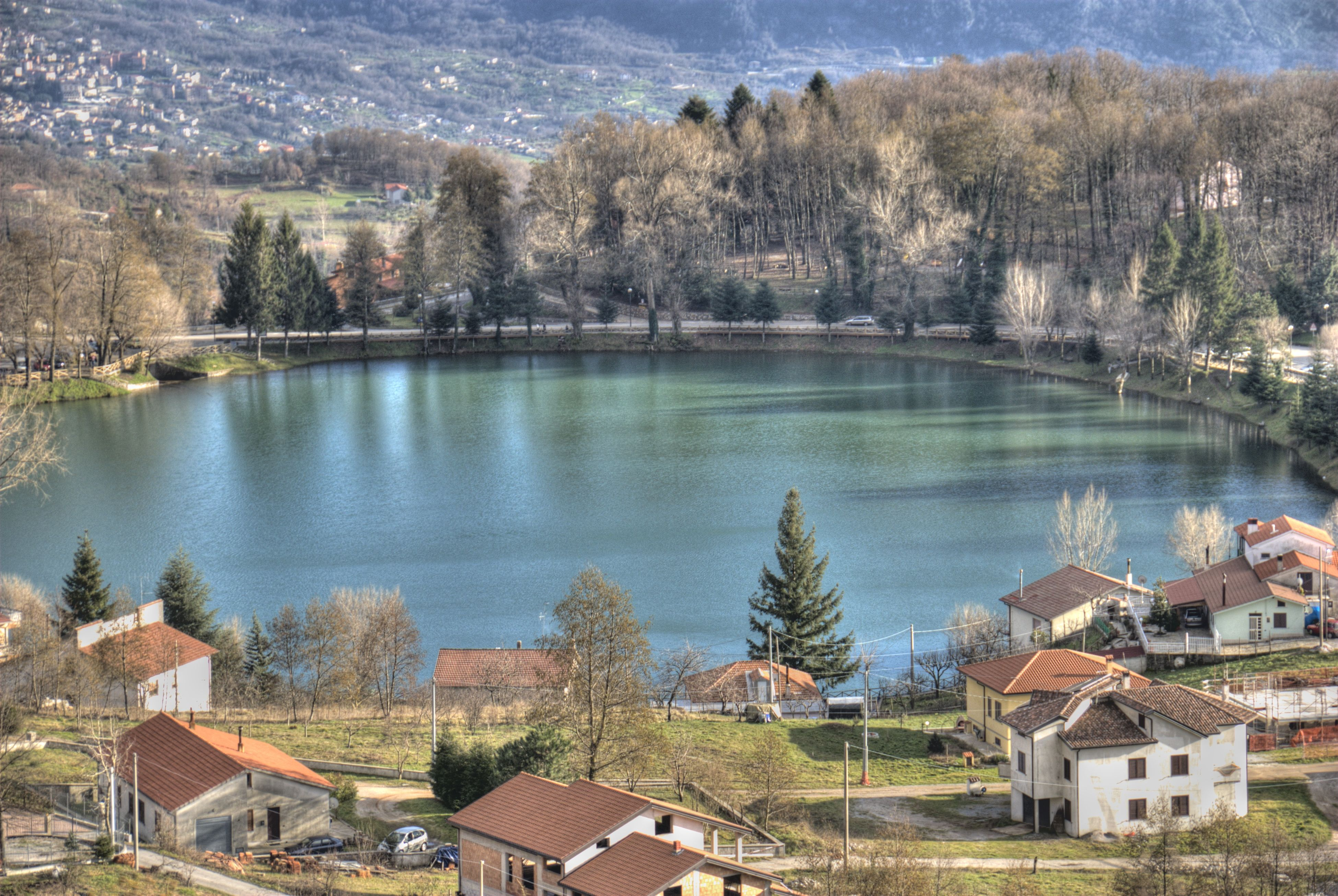

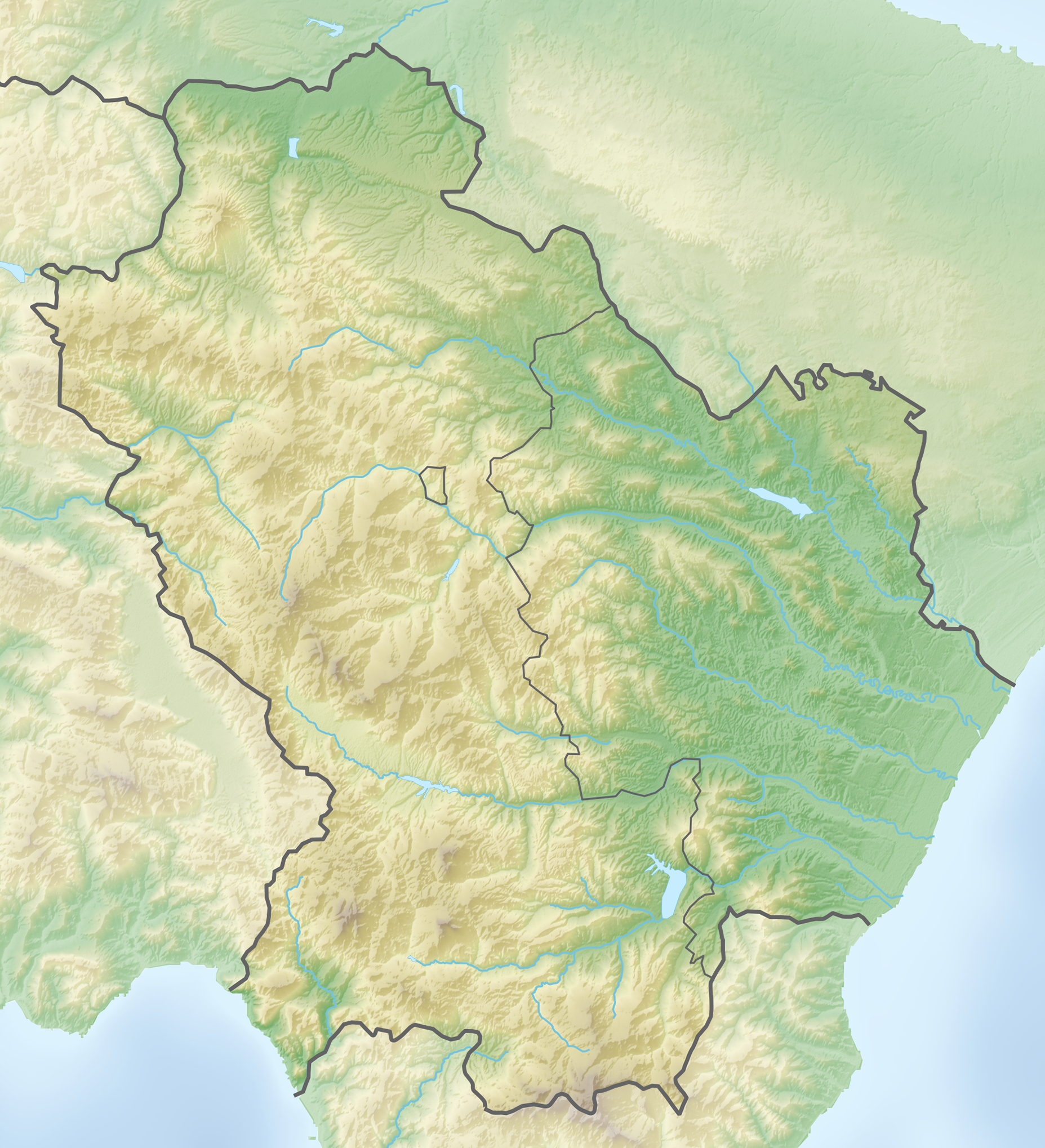
- Location within Basilicata
- Location: Nemoli, Italy
- Coordinates: 40°05′33″N 15°48′31″E
- Surface area: 0.05 km^{2} (0.019 sq mi)
- Max. depth: 9 m (30 ft)
- Surface elevation: 788 m (2,585 ft)

Lake Sirino is a small natural reservoir in Basilicata located in a karst sinkhole at the foot of the mountain of the same name, in the municipality of Nemoli, at an altitude of 788 meters above sea level.

The small lake, practically a pond, is slightly elliptical in shape and is perhaps the last remnant of the large Pleistocene lake that occupied the Noce valley. The body of water, in ancient times much larger than the present five hectares of the winter flood periods, occupied the lake basin of the Noce in prehistoric times, along the present course of the river and widened upstream from the town of Nemoli reaching Lauria; from there, passing through Trecchina, it circled around the slopes of Mount Coccovello and the adjacent mountain ranges.

The bottom and shores of the lake consist of limestone with flint nodules dating from the Triassic period and polychrome jaspers predominantly red, gray, brownish and white, called siliceous schists, from the Jurassic period. The basin is fed by perennial springs and has no visible outfall. The rich flora surrounding it is marked by alders, elms, chestnut trees, poplars, several species of conifers and marsh vegetation. Its waters are populated by a diverse fish fauna consisting of rainbow trout, brown trout, eel, chub, European perch, tench, carp, crucian carp, barbel, largemouth bass, rudd and bleak. Amphibians are also present. It falls within the territory of the Appennino Lucano - Val d'Agri - Lagonegrese National Park.

In feudal times it belonged to the universitas of Rivello; in 1834 it then passed into the jurisdiction of Nemoli, which became in the same year an autonomous municipality independent of Rivello. In recent years there have been a number of episodes of hydrogeological instability, also characterized by the opening of chasms of considerable size that have caused the water level to drop, such as to cause concern among the inhabitants of the hamlet of the same name and within the municipal administration.

On the shores of the lake is located the hamlet of Lago Sirino, which hosts some tourist initiatives and some businesses; the place can be reached in a short time from the A2 Salerno-Reggio Calabria highway (Lagonegro Nord/Sud and Lauria Nord), which overlooks it, through the provincial road formerly known as Strada statale 19 delle Calabrie passing from the south through the hamlet of Pecorone di Lauria. Along the perimeter of the lake there is a 1-kilometer road marked as a cycle path; there is also an RV area in the immediate vicinity.

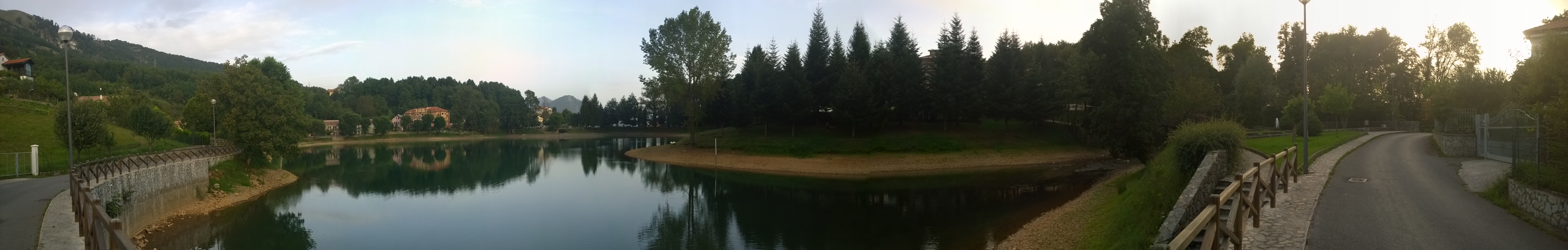

== See also ==
- Massiccio del Sirino
