= Gallo-Italic of Basilicata =

Dialect of Italian

- Native to: Northwest Italy
- Region: Basilicata (Southern Italy)
- Language family: Indo-European: Italic; Latino-Faliscan; Latin; Romance; Italo-Western; Western Romance; Gallo-Iberian; Gallo-Romance; Gallo-Italic; Gallo-Italic of Basilicata

Language codes
- ISO 639-3: –
- Glottolog: None

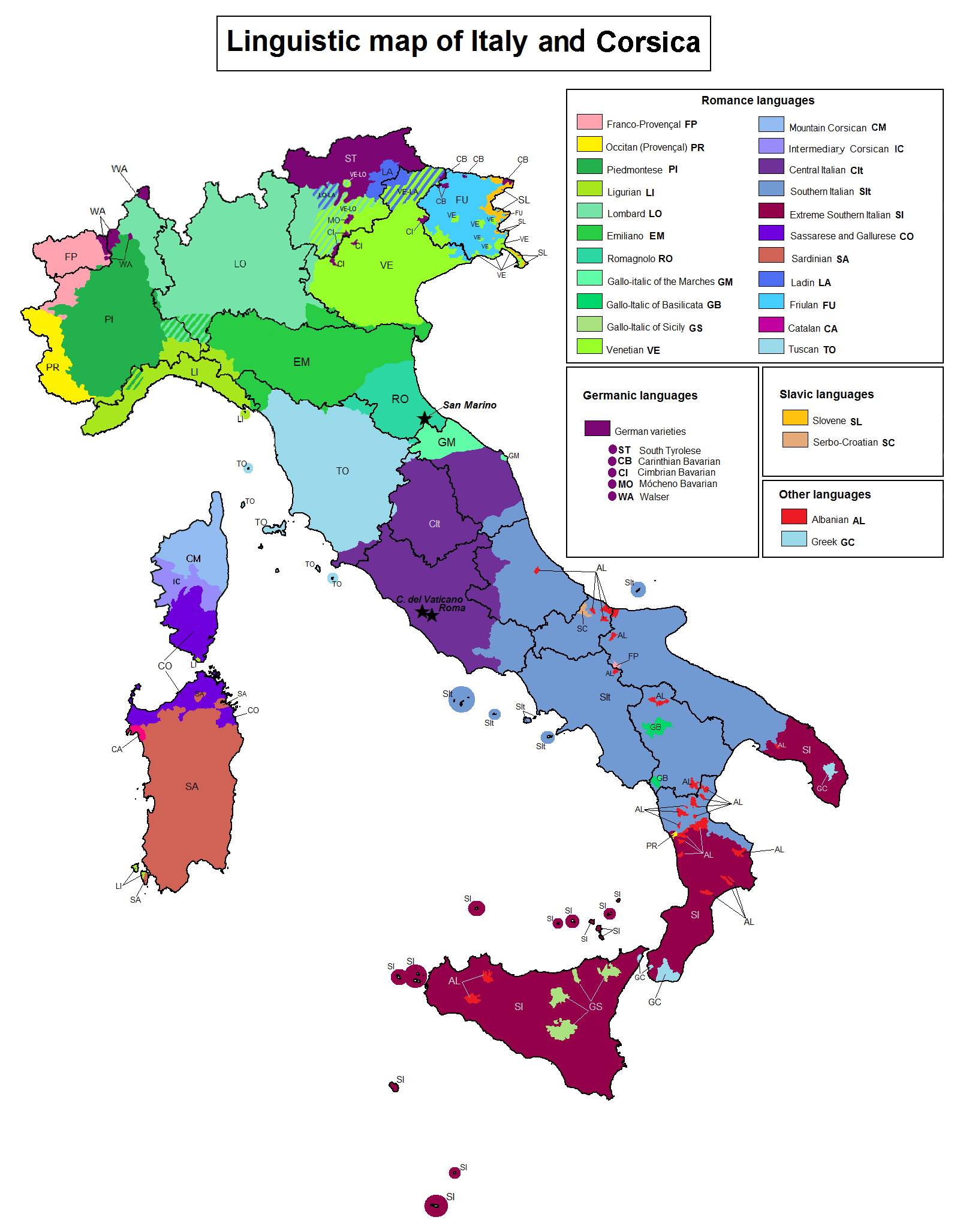
Linguistic map of Italy

The Gallo-Italic of Basilicata (Italian: Gallo-italico di Basilicata) is a group of Gallo-Italic dialects found in Basilicata in southern Italy, that could date back to migrations from Northern Italy during the time of the Normans.

These dialects are found in two areas: one near the regional capital of Potenza (in Tito, Picerno, Pignola and Vaglio Basilicata), but not in Castelmezzano, and another on the Tyrrhenian coast (Trecchina, Rivello, Nemoli and San Costantino).

Similar communities have survived in Sicily, speaking Gallo-Italic dialects of Sicily.

== Sources ==
- Lüdtke, Helmut (1979). Lucania. Profilo dei dialetti italiani, 17. Pisa: Pacini.
- Nicola De Blasi; Paolo Di Giovine; Franco Fanciullo (1991). Le parlate lucane e la dialettologia italiana (Studi in memoria di Gerhard Rohlfs). Atti del convegno di Potenza 1988 (in Italian). Galatina: Congedo Editore. ISBN 88-7786-453-2.
- Rohlfs, Gerhard (1988). Studi linguistici sulla Lucania e sul Cilento (in Italian). Galatina: Congedo Editore. ISBN 978-88-7786-357-7.
- Toso, Fiorenzo (2002). Le minoranze linguistiche in Italia (in Italian). Bologna: Il Mulino. ISBN 88-15-12677-5.
