= Judaeo-Piedmontese =

Extinct variety of the Piedmontese language in Italy

- Native to: Italy
- Region: Piedmont
- Native speakers: nearly extinct (2015)
- Language family: Indo-European: Italic; Latino-Faliscan; Latin; Romance; Italo-Western; Western Romance; Gallo-Iberian; Gallo-Romance; Gallo-Italic; Lombard–Piedmontese?; Piedmontese; Judaeo-Piedmontese

Language codes
- ISO 639-3: –

Judaeo-Piedmontese was the vernacular language of the Italian Jews living in Piedmont, Italy, from about the 15th century until World War II. It was based on the Piedmontese language, with many loanwords from ancient Hebrew, Provençal, and Spanish. Most of the speakers were murdered during the war, and as of 2015 it is virtually extinct.

== Vocabulary ==
The dialect never had written phonetic rules; the words in this list are written according to Agostino della Sala Spada's short satirical poem La gran battaja d’j’abrei d’Moncalv (The great battle of the Jews of Moncalvo, La gran battaglia degli ebrei di Moncalvo in Italian) and Primo Levi's book The Periodic Table.

Much like other Judaeo-Italian dialects, certain words could be made by combining Italian dialectal and Hebrew influences, for example, 'masakinim' "avaricious, stingy person" from Northern Italian 'masà' "to kill" and Hebrew 'kinnim' "lice"; 'ciápa ganáu' "gendarme" from Northern Italian 'ciapar' "to catch" and Hebrew 'gannav' "thief" or 'pagahov' "forced courtesy, duty call" from Italian 'pagare' and Hebrew 'ḥov', "debt".

Pronunciation:

(kh) as in German "Nacht".

(ñ) nasal, as in English "sing"; not to be confused with the Spanish ñ.

(ô) as in English "loom".

(u) like the French u or the German ü.

(sc) like the English sh.

(j) as in German "Jung" or in English "young".

- (a)brakhà - blessing
- Adonai Eloénô - God, Lord
- bahalòm - in a dream (used for jokes)
- barakhùt - blessed
- barôcabà - Welcome! (literally: Blessed be he who comes!)
- batacaìn - cemetery
- beemà - beast
- berìt - pact, penis (vulgar)
- Cadòss Barôkhù - God
- casacà - right to housing, right to an extension of the concession
- cassèr - community, ghetto
- ciápa ganáu - gendarme
- frascata - Sukkot festival
- ganàv - thief
- ganavé - to steal
- ghescér - bridge
- gôì - non-Jewish man
- gôià - non-Jewish woman
- gojìm - non-Jewish people
- hafassìm - jewels (lit. "stuff")
- hamòr - donkey
- hamortà - stupid woman (lit. female of donkey)
- hasìr - pig
- hasirùd - rubbish
- havertà - rough and dissolute woman
- jorzai/ursái/orsái - anniversary of the death of a relative, commemoration of the dead
- khakhàm - rabbi (lit. "learned one")
- khalaviòd - breasts (from Hebrew "halav", milk)
- khaltrùm - Catholic bigotry
- khamisà - five
- khamissidò - slap
- khanéc - neck (pregnant with meaning, used to swear)
- khaniké - to hang (kill)
- khèder - room
- kinìm - lice
- lakhtì - (exclamation) go away!
- Lassòn Acòdesh - Sacred Language
- macòd - blows
- maftèkh - key
- mahabáre - to hide
- mahané - neck (generic and neutral)
- malasehorà - sadness, melancholy
- mamsér - bastard
- mañòd - money
- masakinim - avaricious, stingy person
- medà meshônà - accident (lit. "strange death")
- menaghèm / meraghèl - spy
- musaf 'd kippur - long, grouchy face
- Milca - Queen
- morénô - rabbi (lit. "our master")
- nainé - to look at
- ñarél - non-circumcised
- ndohanà - adorned, dressed for a festive occasion
- nero - evil, bad, terrible
- pakhàt - fear
- pagahov - forced courtesy, duty call
- pegartà - dead woman
- pôñaltà - dirty, shabbily-clothed woman
- pôñèl - dirty, shabbily-clothed man
- rabbenù - rabbi
- rashàn - non-pious
- rôkhòd - winds
- ruàkh - wind
- samdé - to baptize (lit. "destroy")
- sarfatìm - guards
- saròd - disgraced
- scòla - synagogue, temple
- sefòkh - toddler vomit
- sôrada - appearance, look
- sôtià - crazy woman
- tafùs - prison, jail (it is a Hebrew loanword in Piedmontese jargon. Ca tafus meaning "jail", from ca house, although the piedmontese word is përzon)
- takhôrìm - haemorroids
- tanhanè - to argue

== See also ==
- History of the Jews in Asti

== Sources ==
- La gran battaja d’j’abrei d’Moncalv
