= Nemoli =

- Comune
- Comune di Nemoli
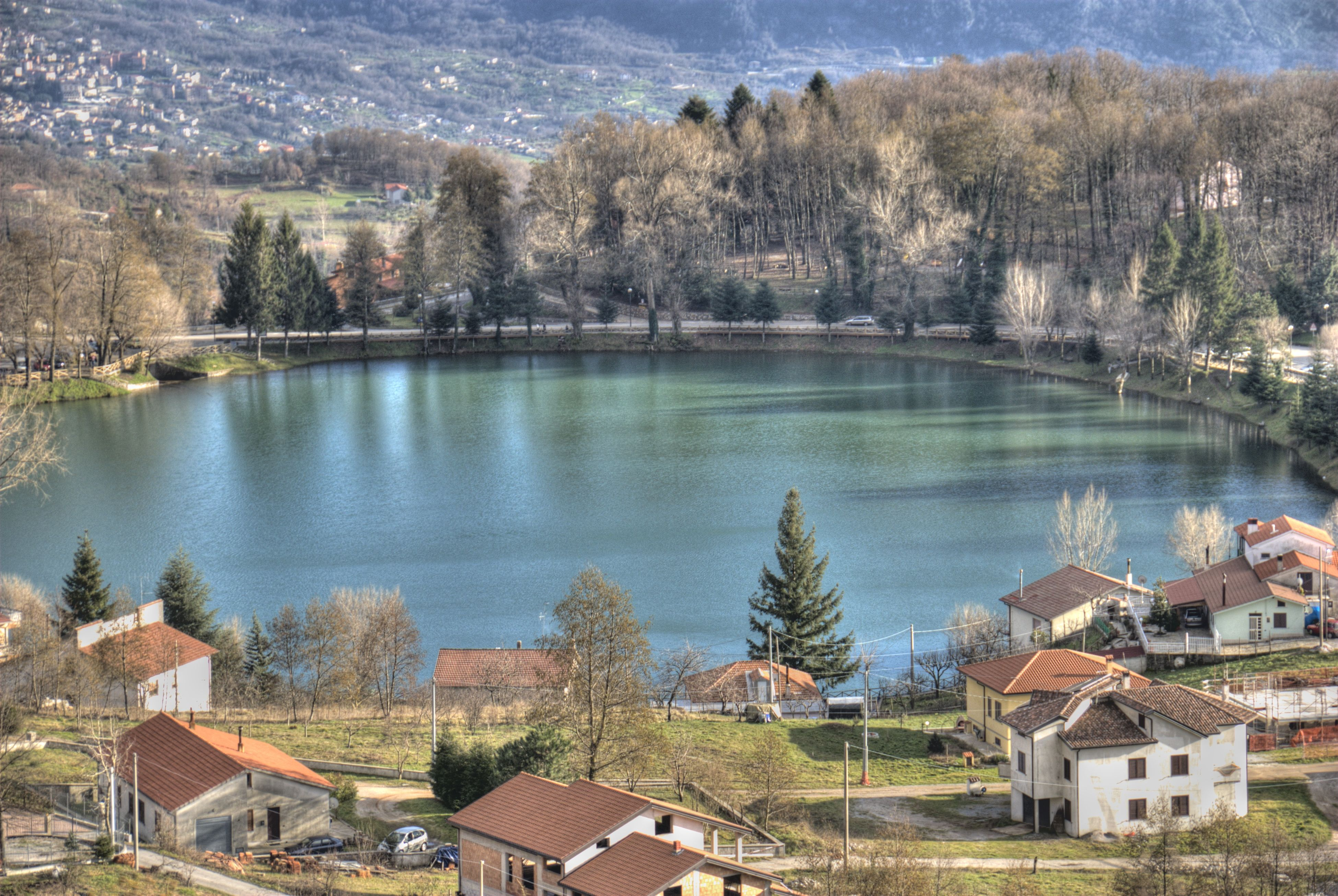
- Lake Sirino, Nemoli

- Position of Nemoli inside the province of Potenza

- Location within Italy Location within Basilicata
- Coordinates: 40°4′N 15°48′E
- Country: Italy
- Region: Basilicata
- Province: Potenza (PZ)
- Frazioni: Lago Sirino, Varco Valle

Area
  - Total: 19 km^{2} (7.3 sq mi)
- Elevation: 421 m (1,381 ft)

Population (1 January 2008)
  - Total: 1,536
  - Density: 81/km^{2} (210/sq mi)
- Demonym: Nemolesi
- Time zone: UTC+1 (CET)
  - Summer (DST): UTC+2 (CEST)
- Postal code: 85040
- Dialing code: 0973
- ISTAT code: 076054
- Patron saint: San Pietro
- Saint day: 7 April
- Website: Official website

Nemoli is a town and comune of 1,501 inhabitants, found in the province of Potenza, in the Southern Italian region of Basilicata. The town, positioned between the Apennine Mountains, is noted for its artisanal work, typically in wood and copper.

== Geography ==
Nemoli is found in the southernmost area of the province of Potenza. Its territory extends for about 12 miles, or 19.7 kilometers. Located at the center of the Noce valley, it's surrounded by the Sonante, Torbido, and Pulcino rivers, aqueducts from which supply many of the surrounding valley towns with water. To the north, near the old station of Nemoli, at 2585 feet or 788 meters above sea-level, is Lake Sirino.

Nemoli is surrounded by the Apennine Mountains, whose notable peaks include Mount Coccovello (4,938 feet or 1,505 metres) and Mount Sirino (6,256 feet or 1,907 metres). The region has various vegetation, including fruit trees, olive trees, beech trees, vines, meadows. Among which there are foxes, hares, badgers, martens, hedgehogs and the rare European squirrel "moscardino". It is also possible to see imperial crows, kits, and buzzards fly over the valley.

In the main center of town, there are archways, alleys, Neapolitan style galleries, the eighteenth-century palazzo filizzola, and a bronze monument dedicated to fallen soldiers.

== History ==
The first traces of human settlement in the Nemoli region date back to the fifth century, such as particular bronze statuettes discovered around the area. These statues, which typically represent warriors and animals, suggest an existence of a Phoencian city called Irie, whose inhabitants worshipped a male deity. The first signs of residential life in the area date back to the first centuries of the last millennium. During medieval times, Nemoli, then called Bosco, depended on the city of Lauria, where the abbey of San Filippo was located. The town then merged with the territory of Rivello, which was one of three homesteads in the area, including San Costantino and Rotale. In 1650, a large group of Waldensians settled there, having been driven out of Calabria, which greatly increased the local population.

During the brief government of the Parthenopean Republic of 1799, the area became known as La Serra, re-entering the administrative system of the Crati department and, at a more strictly local level, of the Lauria canton. In 1806, per the desire of Giuseppe Bonaparte, the consular road delle Calabrie began to be built. This road, which crossed Bosco, brought economic prosperity and an increase in population. In these abundant times, there were factories such as ironworks and mills. Bosco also became a place of rest for carters passing through. Starting from 1824, there were numerous petitions and exhibits, forwarded to authorities and the minister and secretary of state of internal affairs, to make Bosco autonomous from Rivello. But all responses were negative, in part due to the fact that the inhabitants of Bosco and of Rivello constituted the one and only parish.

The area was renamed Nemoli with a special decree from the Borbone reign of Naples, just after the destruction of the town of the same name, Bosco in Cilento, burned and destroyed in 1828 for rebelling against the Borbone reign in Naples. Taking advantage of a visit by the king of Naples, Ferdinando II di Borbone, on 10 April 1833, a Bosco delegate took position on the shores of Lake Sirino and declared his desire for autonomy from Rivello. On 6 June in 1833, the request for independence was formally expressed to Naples, asking also to change the name of the area so as not to confuse it with the previously destroyed Bosco of Cilento. Nemoli was among the possible alternatives, as it comes from the Latin Nemus Olim, meaning once Bosco. With a decree issued 8 December 1833, Ferdinando II gave Bosco the right to build itself autonomously as a comune and to finally render itself independent from Rivello, with the name Nemoli, starting from 1 January 1834. A century later, the commission of ecclesiastical affairs submitted a request of the king to have a separate parish. As a result, inhabitants of Nemoli finally obtained their own parish on 11 October 1938 with the erecting of a church to santa Maria delle Grazie, alleviating tensions between locals.

== Monuments and interesting sites ==
- Church of Santa Maria delle Grazie - from 1600, the church conserves a wooden overhanging altar, which holds the statue of the Madonna, made in the Byzantine style of polychrome dating back to the fourteenth century. There is also a holy water stoup made by F. De Sicignano in 1512, a bell from 1373, and a remarkable rose window constructed by Florentine artisans.
- Church of Lake Sirino – this church has a rose window, other effigies of the Neapolitan school, a statue of Christ made by master craftsmen of Ortisei and a wooden group of Santa Famiglia.
- Church of Santa Maria
- Filizzola Palace

== Society ==
=== Language and dialects ===
The population speaks a Gallo-Italic dialect.

=== Traditions and folklore ===
Polenta festival

The polenta festival is an ancient tradition that developed around Carnevale, and that took life from spontaneous offers of the population that led to its organization. Every year, there's more than 1000 pounds (or 5 quintals) of polenta, prepared according to a centuries-old recipe with a sauce made from sausage, bacon, and ground red pepper. The polenta is offered to everyone who arrives in the town. Every serving is accompanied with local wine made by nemolesi manufacturers.

Christmas bonfire

It's a typical Nemolesi custom to light a big fire at night on Christmas Eve in the middle of Umberto I plaza. The bonfire is kept alive by various locals until Epiphany (or 6 January) and becomes a hangout spot for locals and not, who can warm up and chat while waiting for holy mass.

== Culture ==
=== Music ===
In the popular music sphere, Nemoli has a tradition tied to songs that represent various working conditions, world events, and religious events. As in most of the Valnocina area, the organ or mandacett is the most common instrument for the style. Nemolesi musical tradition is most tied to the rites around Carnevale and Easter, for which instruments such as O 'Tricca'ballac and A' Trocc'l are played. Although not an instrument of Nemolese origins, the Cupi Cupi, built with the bladder of the Pig and played in the Carnival period, is also part of the local musical tradition.

=== Sport ===
Nemoli has an amateur soccer team, l'ASD Nemoli, enrolled in the 2nd category of Basilicata.

== Transportation ==
The closest available airport is that of Lamezia Terme.
