= Gallo-Picene language =

Romance language from Pesaro and Urbino

Gallo-Picene
- Gallo-Piceno, Northern Marche, Marche Gallic, Metauro-Pisaurine, Southern Romagnolo
- Native to: Italy
- Region: Marche
- Native speakers: ~400,000
- Language family: Indo-European: Italic; Latino-Faliscan; Latinic; Romance; Italo-Western; Western Romance; Gallo-Iberian?; Gallo-Romance; Gallo-Italic; Emilian–Romagnol; Romagnol?; Gallo-Picene
- Dialects: Conero Gallo-Italic island; Fano; Montemarciano; Pesarese; Senigallia; Urbania; Urbino
- Writing system: Latin

Language codes
- ISO 639-3: None (mis)
- Glottolog: sout2611
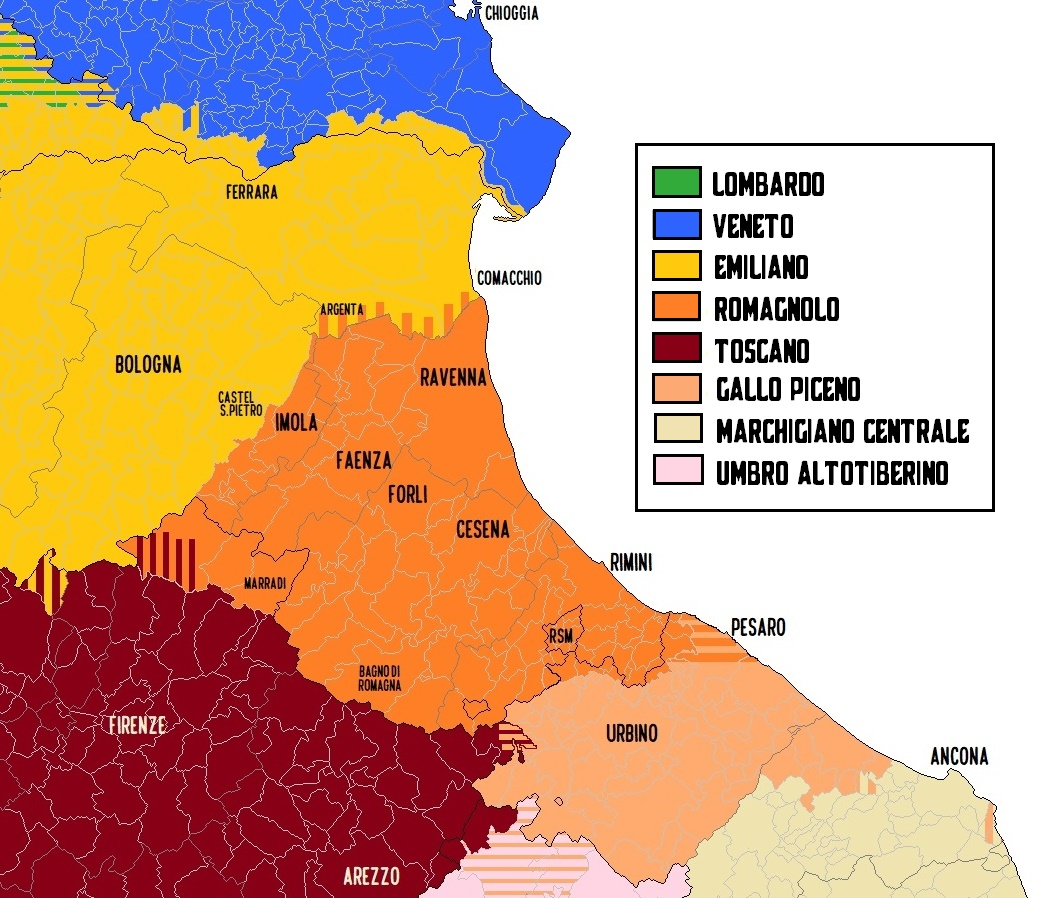
- Gallo Piceno

Gallo-Picene (also known as Gallo-Piceno, Northern Marche, Marche Gallic, Metauro-Pisaurine, Southern Romagnol or Marchignol) defines the set of linguistic varieties of the Gallo-Italic type spoken in almost the entire Province of Pesaro and Urbino and some northern areas of the Province of Ancona (the area of Senigallia and the Gallic linguistic island of Conero), in the Italian region of Marche.

== Classification ==
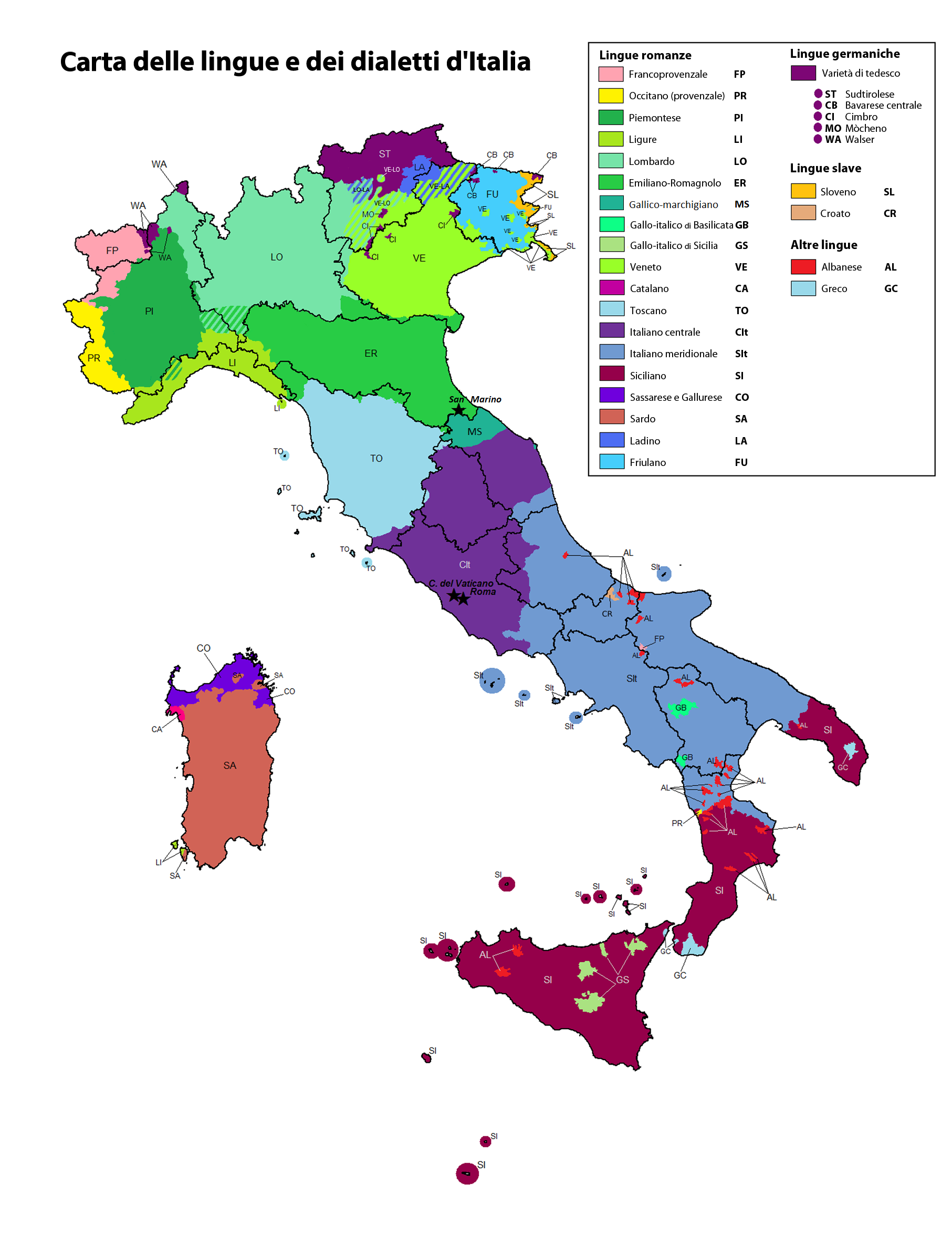
The Gallo-Picene dialect (here referred to as "Gallic Marchigiano - MS") among the dialects and languages spoken in Italy.

Gallo-Picene is an autonomous variant of the Gallo-Italic linguistic group, which also includes Emilian, Ligurian, Lombard, Piedmontese and Romagnol.

According to other linguistic classifications, it would not be autonomous, but should be ascribed or directly connected to Romagnol, which in turn is part of the wider Emilian-Romagnol linguistic continuum. However, a more recent study illustrates the incomplete adhesion of Gallo-Picene to Romagnolo in the light of the Central Italian type elements, alongside the Gallo-Italic phenomena penetrated from eastern Romagna, of which this dialectal group is a forerunner.

== Diffusion and variants ==
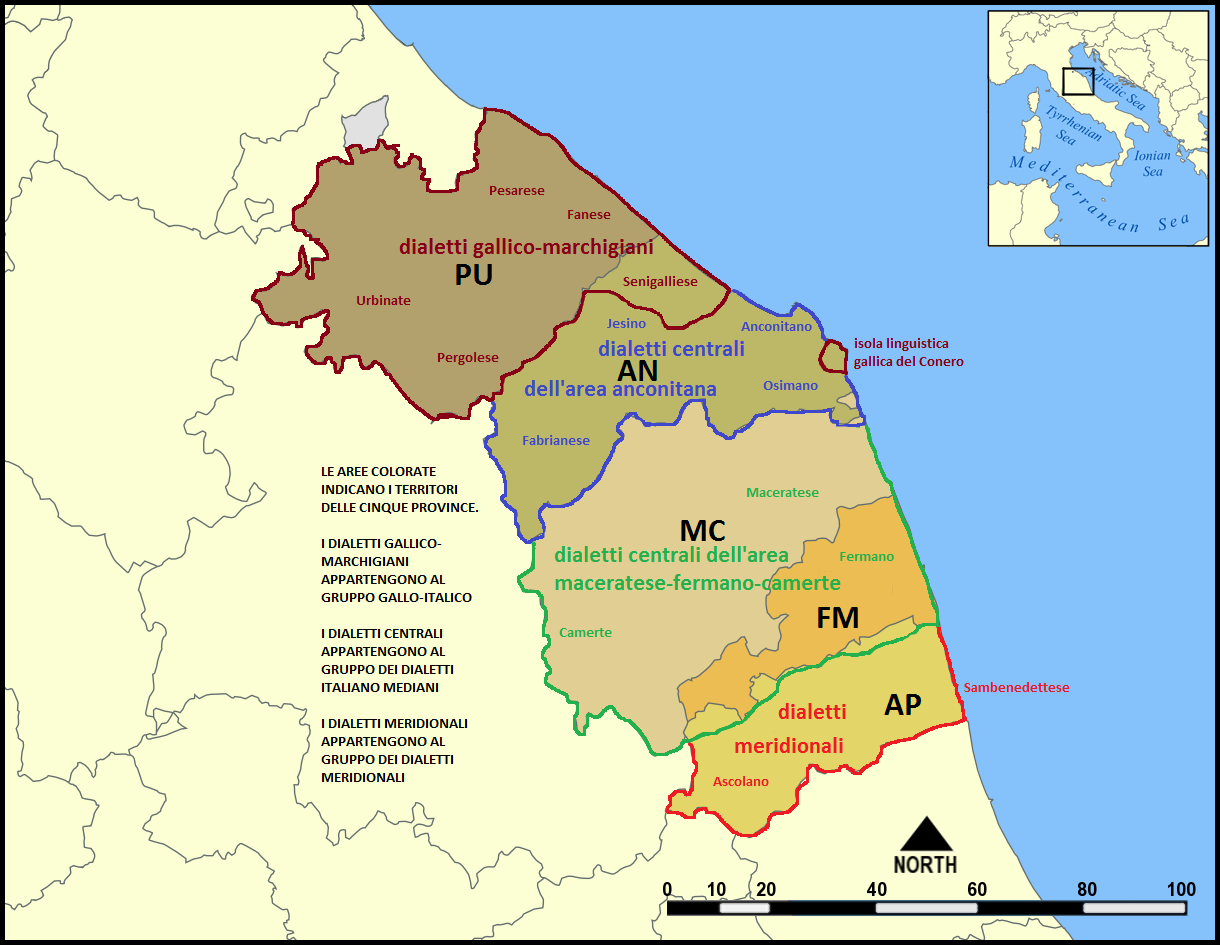
Location of the areas where the Gallo-Picene dialect is widespread, here referred to as "Gallic-Marchean dialects".

The area in which the Gallo-Picene varieties are widespread corresponds to the province of Pesaro and Urbino (with the exception of the Umbrian-speaking area of Pergola), the district of Senigallia and the Gallic linguistic island of Conero in the province of Ancona. However, there is not complete uniformity throughout the area since, despite the similarities of the various dialects distributed throughout the territory, the lexicon and pronunciations can vary. An example is the personal subject pronoun "io": in Fano and Urbino it is said "ì" or "ji", in a good part of the historical region of Montefeltro and in Alta Valmarecchia it is said "ìa", in Tavullia and in other localities of the Pesaro hinterland "jé", in the urban dialect of Pesaro and in the adjacent hamlets it is said "mè" as well as in a good part of the Gallo-Italic dialects (in Lombard, Ligurian and Piedmontese /mi/ and /ti/, in Emilian and in Romagna /me/ and /te/).

On the basis of these differences in vocabulary and pronunciation, three sub-areas have been identified:

- Marecchiese
- Pesarese
- Urbinate-Fanese-Senigalliese
  - Closely connected to this sub-area are the dialects of the Conero Riviera, with the exception of the Ancona dialect, constituting the Gallic linguistic island of Cònero.

Already at the beginning of the 20th century, the philologist Giovanni Crocioni reported the diffusion of Gallo-Picene also south of the traditional border of the Esino river, which progressively loses its Gallic characteristics and acquires those typical of the Central Italian dialects, in a linguistic continuum that reaches up to the Ancona dialect, in which some Gallo-Picene characteristics can be detected. The Gallic linguistic island of Conero, which includes Camerano and the Ancona hamlets of Poggio and Massignano, constitutes the southern outpost of Gallo-Picene.

== Characteristics ==
All the varieties of Gallo-Picene are part of the linguistic group of Gallo-Italic dialects, together with Emilian, Ligurian, Lombard, Piedmontese and Romagnol, especially from the phonetic point of view. They can be briefly summarised as follows:

- Palatization of a in free syllables, a phenomenon also found in Perugia, which occurs systematically in the Pesaro dialect and in the variants of the Urbino and Metauro countryside (with the exception of some dialects); for example, in Pesaro chèsa is used for house, falegnèm for carpenter, chèr for dear, pèdra for father, while in Fano and in the city of Urbino chèsa, falegnàm, càr, pàder or pàdre are used);
- The tonic i before a nasal becomes é (or a diphthong éi) in Pesaro and in the areas bordering Romagna (vén or véin for wine, cucéna or cucéina for cooking)
- The open pronunciation of final stressed e (mε, trε, perchε, especially in Pesaro and Urbino, while in Fano and Senigallia the pronunciation is generally closed as in standard Italian);
- The different distribution of open and closed vowels (béne, éra, sédia), in particular in the dialects of the Marecchiese sub-area and of the Pesaro countryside bordering Romagna (Gabicce Mare and Gradara), in which this type of pronunciation is even more marked (sémpre, niénte, lénto ma lèsso, mòndo, sèmbra ma ròtto, strètto), a phenomenon which also continues in the Rimini-type Romagnol dialect;
- The reduction to ì of the diphthong "iè" in a free syllable in the Pesaro variant (pìd for "foot", pìtra for "stone", bichìr for "glass"), while in Urbino and Senigallia the diphthong is maintained with a narrow pronunciation (piéd or pìa for "foot", diétra for "behind", piétra for "stone", bichiér for "glass");
- The final unstressed sounds disappear completely, as do many of the medials with the exception of -a (dmèn - dmàn in the Fano and Urbino variants for "tomorrow", fémna for "female"), with a consequent drastic reduction of syllables in polysyllabic words (stmèn -stmàn in the Fano and Urbino variants for "weeks"); this phenomenon occurs in a slightly different way in Senigallia, where vowels with an indistinct timbre (schwa) sometimes appear in place of the etymological vowels.

On the consonantal level, notable features are:

- The simplification of intense consonants, in pre-accentual position in almost all variants and, in Pesaro and Fano, also in post-accentual position (e.g. in Pesaro cità, dòna, ragàza, while in Urbino they say dònna and ragàssa), a phenomenon which however also borders on linguistically "median" territory, as demonstrated by the dialect of Ancona;
- The lenition of intervocalic voiceless sounds (avùd for "had", fadìga for "fatigue", fóg for "fire"), which extends even further south into the central Marche region, and can also be found in Jesi and Osimo (magnado for "eaten", dide for "you say").
- The voicing of intervocalic s, present throughout the area and as far as Ancona.

Among the morphological-syntactic traits, we can note the plurals in -ai, -ei, -oi from singulars in "-al, -el, -ol", as also in Veneto (cavài, cavéi, fagiói) and then, in the Pesaro sub-area, the personal subject pronouns of the type mε, tε for "I" "you", and the reduplication of the entire pronominal series with forms without accent (in Pesaro mε a parle "I speak", tε t zi "you are", ló 'l bala "he dances", lori i bala "they dance", el vènt el tira, etc.), phenomena typical of Gallo-Italic dialects.

Another characteristic that directly refers to other Gallo-Italic idioms is the loss of internal and final unstressed vowels (other than /a/) and the reduction in protony: /bli:n/ (bellino). The typical Gallo-Italic metaphony is also present and the reduction of double vowels in postonic position /surE:la/. Up to the Metauro river, the presence of subject clitics and the transition from /a/ > /E/ in free syllables and the transition from /ts/, /dz/ > /s/, /z/ are documented: /tsio/ > /sio/ (zio), /dzeta/ > /zeta/ (zeta).

== Examples ==
The beginning of Giovanni Boccaccio's story Il re di Cipri, da una donna di Guascogna trafitto, di cattivo valoroso diviene in the various Gallo-Picene dialects, taken from I parlari italiani in Certaldo alla festa del V centenario di Messer Giovanni Boccacci (published in 1875):

=== Pesaro dialect ===
A digh donca ch'ai temp del prim re 'd Cipr, dop la conquista fata dla Tera Sänta da Gufred 'd Bujon, sucess ch'na sgnora 'd Guascogna la j'andò 'n piligrinagg m'al Sipulcr 'd nostr Signor, da dò tornand, ariväda ch'la fó a Cipr, da certi sceleräd la fó tratäda pegg d'na cagna.

=== Fano dialect ===
I' v' dig donca che in ti temp del prim re de Cipr, dop che Gottifred de Bujon ebb' presa la Terra Santa, una sgnora dla Guascogna andò come piligrina al Sant Spolcr; e po tornò e andò a Cipr, e in quel sit certi sceleræt i fecer na grossa purcata.

=== Urbania dialect ===
Donca digh ch'ai temp del prim re 'd Cipri, dop che Gofred 'd Bujon ebb artolt m'ai Turchi la Tera Santa, sucess ch'na signora 'd Guascogna git in pelegrinagg m'al Sant Sepolcr; e, t'el tornè, rivèta ch'fò a Cipri, sochi birbacioni e maladuchèti i 'j fen vergogna.

=== Urbino dialect ===
Donca digh ch'al temp del prim re di Cipri, dop pijat la Tera Santa da Gottifré di Buglione, sucess ch'na sgnora civila vols gì artrovä 'l Sepolcher. int l'arnì, riväta m'a Cipri, certi birbacion i dicen 'na mochia 'd vilanii.:

=== Senigallia dialect ===
Digh donca ch'ent i temp del prim re 'd Zipr, dop la presgia dla Tera Scianta fatta da Gottifrè 'd Bujon è suzzess ch'na scignora 'd Cascogna in pelegrinazz era gita al Spulcr, d'indov turnand, rivata a Zipr, fu da 'n po' 'd selerati omi sa cativ disprezz ultrazata.

=== Montemarciano dialect ===
Dig donca, ch' n' tempi dl prim Re d' Cipri, dop la presa fatta dla Terra Santa da Guttifré d' Buglion, sucdè ch' una signora d' Guascogna fe un viag long fina al Spolcr: dlà arturnand', e arrivata en Cipri, certi omnacci i dicen tant' brut cos, [...].
