= History of the Jews in Asti =

Asti is a city of about 75,000 inhabitants located in the Piedmont region of northwestern Italy, about 55 kilometres (34 miles) east of Turin, in the plain of the Tanaro River. It is the capital of the province of Asti. In the Middle Ages it was an important trade center and the capital of a powerful republic. Though it is believed that Asti's Jewish community existed as early as the 8th century, it became prominent in the area in the 14th century with the arrival of many Jews expelled from France. The Jewish synagogue and cemetery in Asti can still be visited today, as well as the old ghetto, a local Jewish museum and some of the old Jewish homes. Nowadays, however, the Jewish community of Asti consists of only several Jews, and is branched to the Jewish community of Torino.

== History ==
=== Middle ages ===
The first documentation of Jews in Asti dates back to 812, when the phrase "terra Judeo" is mentioned in a document regarding the town, but the authenticity is questionable. It is not until the 14th century that there is evidence of a meaningful Jewish presence.

=== The Renaissance ===
The Jewish community of Asti had enlarged significantly due to the 1322 expulsion of the French Jews by king Charles IV.

In 1469, a local Jew named Perutio is mentioned as a resident of the city. He is mentioned in a context of a business trip to Pavia. Another Jew is mentioned between 1471–1472, requesting refuge in Asti due to a plague that happened in nearby Alexandria. During these years, the city council requested the duke of Orleans, the ruler of the area, to expel the town Jews. The duke refused, though the Jews obligation to wear a yellow badge did remain. In 1515, the Jews named Clement and Solomon sons of Moses, were granted permission to reside in Asti thanks to the privileges given to the Jews of the entire area by its ruler Maximilian Sforza.

After the town was given in 1530 to the Duchy of Savoy, its ruler Beatrice of Portugal, Duchess of Savoy ordered the expulsion of all Jews living in the town and its surroundings. Jews were readmitted to the town after her death, allowing them to practice loans. And many Jews did practice money lending, such as Isaac and Jacob Puget and Elijah from Nice who opened two loan banks in Asti after they were granted permission to do so. The rulers of Asti and Savoy had a strong interest in maintaining the Jewish money lending businesses since the latter paid fees for licensing and other grants to the rulers. In 1565, two money lending businesses were active in Asti, by the three Jews mentioned earlier. Prohibitions and regulations by the rulers made it illegal and impossible to open any other money lending business without the agreement of the two businesses approval. By the second half of the 16th century, the Asti bank businesses had already owned local banks in other towns such as Alba, Crescentino and Chieri. By 1597, two other banks were also active in Asti, owned by Puges Moses and Abraham Concio.

== The Ghetto ==
The Jewish Ghetto was formally established in the third decade of the 18th century, as a result of the 1723 constitution of Savoy. Though most Jews had already lived close to each other, from 1730 till 1798 (the publication of the Napoleonic decree), it was mandatory to do so. The gates to the ghetto were probably located on both sides of the current Via Alberti. On the other side it was limited by Via Ottolenghi.

== Privileges of the Jewish community of Asti ==
The Jewish community of Asti enjoyed better conditions and lesser prohibitions by the rulers of the Duchy of Savoy in comparison to the rest of the Jewish communities in Savoy. Since 1538 and on, Asti Jews were allowed to settle internal issues by two Jewish arbitrators, unlike other communities around. They could not be sued during feast days, they were entitled to own their own cemetery and they were even entitled to move out of the city, due to wars and other reasons, with permission to return.

== See also ==
- Judaeo-Piedmontese
