= Romagnol =

Romance language spoken in Romagna (Italy) and San Marino

- Rumagnôl, Rumagnùl
- Pronunciation: [rumɐˈɲoːl] or [rumɐˈɲoə̯l], [rumɐˈɲul]
- Native to: Italy, San Marino
- Region: Primarily Emilia-Romagna, San Marino, Marche
- Ethnicity: 1.1 million (2008)
- Native speakers: Unknown, c. 430,000, assuming Romagnol and Emilian retained at same rate (2006)
- Language family: Indo-European: Italic; Latino-Faliscan; Latinic; Romance; Italo-Western; Western Romance; Gallo-Iberian?; Gallo-Romance; Gallo-Italic; Emilian–Romagnol; Romagnol
- Dialects: Ravennate; Forlivese; Faentino; Cesenate; Riminese; Sammarinese; Gallo-Picene (disputed)
- Writing system: Latin

Language codes
- ISO 639-3: rgn
- Glottolog: roma1328
- ELP: Romagnol
- Linguasphere: 51-AAA-oki ... okl
- Romagnol is classified as Definitely Endangered by the UNESCO Atlas of the World's Languages in Danger

Romagnol (rumagnôl or rumagnùl; Italian: romagnolo) is a Romance language spoken in the historical region of Romagna, consisting mainly of the southeastern part of Emilia-Romagna, Italy. The name is derived from the Lombard name for the region, Romagna. Romagnol is classified as endangered because older generations have "neglected to pass on the dialect as a native tongue to the next generation".

== Classification ==
Romagnol belongs to the Gallo-Romance family alongside Piedmontese, Ligurian and Lombard, forming with Emilian and as one of the two branches of the Emilian-Romagnol linguistic continuum.

Further groupings of variants of Romagnol have not been set yet and both speakers and authors tend to refer to their own town or the nearest major province cities.

The variants of Romagnol form a dialect continuum with their neighbouring varieties, while the more distant dialects might be less mutually intelligible. Variants spoken north of the Santerno river are considered by speakers of Sammarinese as being less, but still, intelligible, while past the Sillaro such intelligibility is lost.

=== Forlivese variety ===
Forlivese is the central variety of Romagnol spoken in the city of Forlì and in its province.

In Italian-speaking contexts, Forlivese (like most of the other non-Italian language varieties spoken within the borders of the Italian Republic) is often described as a "dialect". However, this is not the case, as Romagnol and Italian are different Romance languages and, therefore, only partially mutually intelligible.

Forlivese is a central Romagnol variety, still intelligible to speakers of other neighbouring Romagnol varieties. Currently, the use of Forlivese is mostly limited to familiar terms and sentences, and is rare amongst Forlì inhabitants. Some pieces of literature and a recent translation of the Gospels are available. In his De vulgari eloquentia, Dante Alighieri also speaks of Romagnol and cites the city of Forlì as meditullium, that is, the central place of Romagna.

== Geographic distribution ==
=== Western border ===
In the West, The Sillaro river marks the cultural and linguistic border between Emilian language speakers and Romagnol speakers; it runs 25 km east from Bologna to the west of Castel San Pietro Terme. Romagnol is spoken to the east of this river and to the south of the Reno river.
In the rest of Emilia-Romagna Region, Emilian is spoken in all the rest of the region moving from the Sillaro river to the west, up to Piacenza, and to the north of the Reno, up to the Po.

=== Northern border ===
The Reno river is the border between Romagnol and the dialect of Ferrara. Romagnol is spoken also in some villages northwards of the Reno river, such as Argenta and Filo, where people of Romagnol origin live alongside people of Ferrarese origin. Ferrara goes into Emilian language territory.

=== Southern border ===
Outside Emilia-Romagna, Romagnol is spoken in the Republic of San Marino ("Sammarinese"), and in two municipalities located in the province of Florence, Marradi and Palazzuolo sul Senio.

In the province of Pesaro and Urbino of Marche region, Gallo-Picene is spoken, but its status as sub-variant of Romagnol or as separate language is disputed.

== History ==
Romagnol's first acknowledgement outside regional literature was in Dante Alighieri's treatise De vulgari eloquentia, wherein Dante compares "the language of Romagna" to his native Tuscan dialect. Eventually, in 1629, the author Adriano Banchieri wrote the treatise Discorso della lingua Bolognese, which countered Dante's claim that the Tuscan dialect was better, arguing his belief that Bolognese (an Emilian dialect influenced by Romagnol that saw wide use in writing) was superior in "naturalness, softness, musicality, and usefulness". Romagnol received more recognition after Romagna gained independence from the Papal States.

=== Literature ===
==== 16th to 19th century ====
The first appearance of a distinct Romagnol literary work is "Sonetto romagnolo" by Bernardino Catti, from Ravenna, printed 1502. It is written in a mixture of Italian and Romagnol.

The first Romagnol poem dates back to the end of the 16th century: E Pvlon matt. Cantlena aroica (Mad Nap), a mock-heroic poem based on Orlando Furioso and written by an anonymous author from San Vittore di Cesena. The original poem comprised twelve cantos, of which only the first four survived (1848 lines).

The first Romagnol poet to win fame was the cleric Pietro Santoni, (Fusignano, 1736–1823). He was the teacher of Vincenzo Monti, one of the most famous Italian poets of his time.

In 1840, the first Romagnol-Italian Dictionary was published by Antonio Morri; it was printed in Faenza.

==== 20th century ====
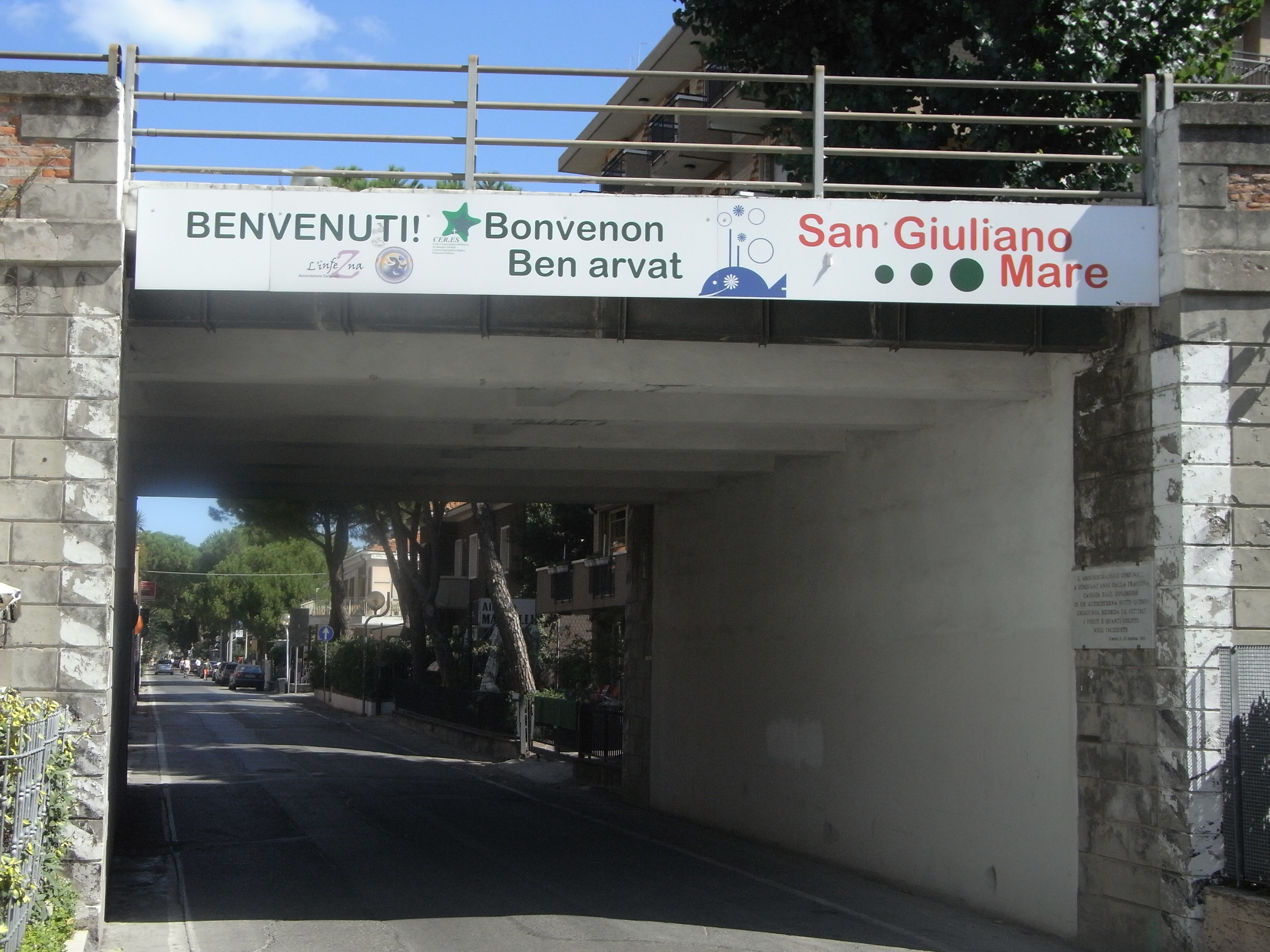
Sign in Rimini with welcome message in Italian, Esperanto and Romagnol (Ben arvat).

The 20th century saw a flourishing of Romagnol literature. Theatrical plays, poems and books of a high quality were produced. Some of the best known Romagnol authors are:

- Raffaello Baldini, who won in 1988 the "Premio Viareggio" and in 1995 the "Premio Bagutta", known for long pessimistic poems and prose
- Tonino Guerra (1920–2012), wrote poems during his exile to WWII-era Germany, focusing on people of suffering and poverty
- Giuliana Rocchi (1922–1996), a poet from Santarcangelo di Romagna whose work drew on her experiences as a working-class woman and addressed everyday life, social inequality, and the condition of women. Her poetry collections include La vóita d’una dòna (1980–81) and La Madòna di Garzéun (1986).
- Olindo Guerrini, with "Sonetti romagnoli"
- Aldo Spallicci, an antifascist exiled from Romagna. He wrote poems such as "Rumâgna" that were often descriptive of Romagna
- Lidiana Fabbri (born 1951), from the Rimini area, whose poetry addresses, among other themes, the experiences and social condition of women in Romagna. Her works include S’un fil ad vènt (2007), Garnèli (2009), Mulìghi (2016), and Bascòzi (2022).
- Francesco "Checco" Guidi, with his activity as poet and recorder of local popular expressions and says. He is specialized in the variant of Sammarinese dialect spoken in Serravalle, which is close to Riminese.

Romagnol was the native language of the famous dictator Benito Mussolini.

== Grammar ==
=== Orthography ===
Romagnol lacks a standardized orthography, leading to huge varieties among authors.
The orthography adopted here is from Daniele Vitali's L'ortografia Romagnola (2008).

=== Morphology ===
Unlike Standard Italian, not all nouns end in a theme vowel. Masculine nouns lack theme vowels, and feminine nouns typically (but not always) terminate in a. Masculine nouns and adjectives undergo lexically-specified umlaut to form the plural, and feminine nouns and adjectives form the plural by a becoming i or being deleted after a consonant cluster or geminate consonant.

Romagnol		Italian	
Singular	Plural	Singular	Plural
Sacrêri (m. sg.)	Sacréri (m. pl.)	Sacrario	Sacrari
grând (sg.)	grènd (pl.)	grande	grandi

Both languages derive their lexicon from Vulgar Latin, but some words differ in gender.

Romagnol	Italian	Vulgar Latin	English
la risa	il riso	risus (masc.)	rice
la sècia	il secchio	siclus (masc.)	bucket

=== Syntax ===
Italian and Romagnol share many of the same features when it comes to verbs. Both languages use subject–verb–object in simple sentences for their word order. Verbs are conjugated according to tense, mood, and person. Romagnol also has four conjugations, compared to Standard Italian's three: the first, -êr; the second, -ér; the third, -ar; and the fourth, -ìr. Marked differences in Romagnol from Standard Italian are that personal pronouns are required, and some verbs in Romagnol use a reflexive construction even if the speaker is not the second argument of the verb although Italian uses an intransitive construction.

Romagnol	Italian	English
Me a'm so lavê	(Io) mi sono lavato	I washed myself
Me a sò	(Io) sono	I am
Me a j'ò	(Io) ho	I have

Impersonal verbs, which lack a canonical subject, in Romagnol use "avèr" but in Standard Italian use "essere." Even though the subject is null, an expletive pronoun is inserted in the specifier position, much like "it" in English.

- Italian: è piovuto, It rained
- Romagnol: l'à piuvù, It rained

Also, whereas Standard Italian and other northern dialects omit the definite article before "singular names and names of relatives", Romagnol keeps it.

== Phonology ==
Romagnol has lexical and syntactic uniformity throughout its area. However, its pronunciation changes as one goes from the Po Valley to the hills.

It has an inventory of up to 20 vowels that contrast in the stressed position, compared to seven in Italian. They are marked in the orthography by using diacritics on a, e, i, o and u.

The absence of an official institution regulating its orthography often leads to ambiguities in the transcription of vowel sounds.

=== Syllable structure ===
Some words that in Latin are trisyllabic or tetrasyllabic in which u is not stressed are reduced in Romagnol to being only monosyllabic. An atonic syllable is dropped.

Latin	Romagnol	Italian	English	Emilian
geniculum	znöcc	ginocchio	knee	znocc
tepidus	tèvd	tiepido	tepid	tevad
oculus	öcc	occhio	eye	occ
frigidus	frèd	freddo	cold	fredd

=== Vowels ===
These three tables list the vowel inventory of the "classical" version of the northern macro-dialect of Romagnol.

Monophthongs
	Front	Central	Back
High	i		u
Mid	e	(ə~ɐ)	o
Mid	ɛ	(ə~ɐ)	ɔ
Low		a	

Diphthongs
Symbol	Value
ê	[eə̯]
ô	[oə̯]
ë	[ɛə̯]
ö	[ɔə̯]

Nasal Vowels
Symbol	Value
ã/â	[ə̃]
ẽ	[ɛ̃]
õ	[õ]

The following table lists the vowels above alongside their relative orthography:

Symbol in orthography	"Classical" pronunciation	Dialectal pronunciation around Lugo (RA)	Example in Romagnol	Comparison with Italian	English meaning
ë	ɛə̯	ɛæ̯	bël	bello	"nice" (masculine singular)
è, e	ɛ	ɛ~ɜ	bèl	belli	"nice" (masculine plural)
ê	eə̯	eɜ̯~iɜ̯	fêr	fare	"to do"
é	e	ej	méla	mela	"apple"
ö	ɔə̯	ɔɒ̯	cöl	collo	"neck"
ô	oə̯	oɞ̯	rôda	ruota	"wheel"
ò, o	ɔ	ɔ~ɞ	òngg	undici	"eleven"
ó	o	ow	sól	sole	"sun"
ẽ	ɛ̃	æ̃j̃	bẽ	bene	"fine" (adverb)
ã, â	ə̃	ɤ̃	cã	cane	"dog"
õ	õ	õw̃	bõ	buono	"good"
a	a	ɐ~ə	zèngia	cinghia	"belt"
à, a (when stressed)	a	äː	fàza	faccia	"face"
u	u	u	purtê	portato	"brought"
ù, u (when stressed)	u	ʊu̯	dur	duro	"hard" (masculine singular)
i	i	i	istê	estate	"summer"
ì, i (when stressed)	i	iː~ɪi̯	partìr	partire	"to leave"

=== Consonants ===
	Labial	Inter- dental	Dental/ Alveolar	Retroflex	Palato- alveolar	Palatal	Velar
Nasal	m		n			ɲ	(ŋ)
Stop	p b		t d				k ɡ
Affricate					t͡ʃ d͡ʒ		
Fricative	f v	θ ð	(s z)	ʂ ʐ			
Lateral			l			ʎ	
Trill			r				
Approximant						j	w

The letter z is always pronounced as either [θ] or [ð] and not [t͡s] or [d͡z] as in Standard Italian.

[ŋ] occurs only before velar stops.

Romagnol, in addition to its larger inventory of vowels, also has more consonants compared to Standard Italian. Additionally, consonants have these differences from Standard Italian:

- In central dialects, word-final n is deleted, and the preceding vowel is nasalised, as is shown above.
- /dʒ/ and /tʃ/ can occur word-finally and are usually distinguished by the doubling of the final consonants (cc or gg).
- /ʂ/ and /ʐ/ may be realised as alveolars [s] and [z] by some speakers from the influence of Standard Italian.
- The voicing of those consonants is always contrastive.
