= Gallo-Italic languages =

Family of Romance languages

Gallo-Italic
- Geographic distribution: Italy, San Marino, Switzerland, Monaco, France
- Ethnicity: Italians, Swiss people
- Linguistic classification: Indo-European: Italic; Latino-Faliscan; Latin; Romance; Italo-Western; Western Romance; Gallo-Iberian; Gallo-Romance; Gallo-Italic
- Subdivisions: Piedmontese; Ligurian; Lombard; Emilian-Romagnol (Emilian • Romagnol • Gallo-Picene); Siculo-Lombard; Lucano-Lombard; (disputed Venetian)

Language codes
- Glottolog: gall1279
- Geographic distribution of undisputed Gallo-Italic varieties

The Gallo-Italic languages constitute the majority of the Romance languages of northern Italy: Piedmontese, Lombard, Emilian, Ligurian, and Romagnol. In central Italy they are spoken in the northern Marches (Gallo-Italic of the Marches); in southern Italy in some language islands in Basilicata (Gallo-Italic of Basilicata) and Sicily (Gallo-Italic of Sicily).

Although most publications define Venetian as part of the Italo-Dalmatian branch, both Ethnologue and Glottolog group it into the Gallo-Italic languages.

The languages are spoken also in the departement of Alpes-Maritimes in France and in Ticino and southern Grisons, both in Switzerland, and the microstates of Monaco and San Marino. They are still spoken to some extent by the Italian diaspora in countries with Italian immigrant communities.

Having a Celtic substratum and a Germanic, mostly Lombardic, superstrate, Gallo-Italic descends from the Latin spoken in northern part of Italia (former Cisalpine Gaul). The group had for part of late antiquity and the early Middle Ages a close linguistic link with Gaul and Raetia, west and north to the Alps. From the late Middle Ages, the group adopted various characteristics of the Italo-Dalmatian languages of the south.

As a result, the Gallo-Italic languages have characteristics of the Gallo-Romance languages to the northwest (including French and Franco-Provençal), the Occitano-Romance languages to the west (including Catalan and Occitan) and the Italo-Dalmatian languages to the north-east, central and south Italy (Venetian, Dalmatian, Tuscan, Central Italian, Neapolitan, Sicilian). For this there is some debate over the proper grouping of the Gallo-Italic languages. They are sometimes grouped with Gallo-Romance, but other linguists group them in Italo-Dalmatian.

Most Gallo-Italic languages have to varying degrees given way in everyday use to regional varieties of Italian. The vast majority of current speakers are diglossic with Italian.

Among the regional languages of Italy, they are the most endangered, since in the main cities of their area (Milan, Turin, Genoa, Bologna) they are mainly used by the elderly.

== Geographical distribution ==
Within this sub-family, the language with the largest geographic spread is Lombard, spoken in the Italian region of Lombardy, in eastern Piedmont and western Trentino. Outside Italy it is widespread in Switzerland in the canton of Ticino, and some southern valleys of the canton of the Grisons.

Piedmontese refers to the languages spoken in the region of Piedmont and the north west corner of Liguria. Historically, the Piedmontese-speaking area is the plain at the foot of the Western Alps, and ends at the entrance to the valleys where Occitan and Franco-Provençal are spoken. In recent centuries, the language has also spread into these valleys, where it is also more widely spoken than these two languages, thus the borders of Piedmontese have reached the western alps watershed that is the border with France.

The speaking area of Ligurian or Genoese cover the territory of the former Republic of Genoa, which included much of nowadays Liguria, and some mountain areas of bordering regions near the Ligurian border, the upper valley of Roya river near Nice, in Carloforte and Calasetta in Southern Sardinia, and Bonifacio in Corsica.

Emilian is spoken in the historical-cultural region of Emilia, which forms part of Emilia-Romagna, but also in many areas of the bordering regions, including southern Lombardy, south-eastern Piedmont, around the town of Tortona, province of Massa and Carrara in Tuscany and Polesine in Veneto, near the Po delta. With Romagnol, spoken in the historical region of Romagna, forms the Emilian-Romagnol linguistic continuum.

Gallo-Piceno (gallo-italic of the Marches or gallico-marchigiano) is spoken in the province of Pesaro and Urbino and in the northern part of the province of Ancona (Marche). Once classified as a dialect of Romagnol, now there is a debate about considering it a separated Gallo-Italic language.

=== Isolated varieties in Sicily and in Basilicata (Southern Gallo-Italic variants) ===
Varieties of Gallo-Italic languages are also found in Sicily, corresponding with the central-eastern parts of the island that received large numbers of immigrants from Northern Italy, called Lombards, during the decades following the Norman conquest of Sicily (around 1080 to 1120). Given the time that has lapsed and the influence from the Sicilian language itself, these dialects are best generically described as Southern Gallo-Italic. The major centres where these dialects can still be heard today include Piazza Armerina, Aidone, Sperlinga, San Fratello, Nicosia, and Novara di Sicilia. Northern Italian dialects did not survive in some towns in the province of Catania that developed large Lombard communities during this period, namely Randazzo, Paternò and Bronte. However, the Northern Italian influence in the local varieties of Sicilian are marked. In the case of San Fratello, some linguists suggested that the nowadays dialect has Provençal as its basis, having been a fort manned by Provençal mercenaries in the early decades of the Norman conquest (bearing in mind that it took the Normans 30 years to conquer the whole of the island).

Other dialects, attested from 13th and 14th century, are also found in Basilicata, more precisely in the province of Potenza (Tito, Picerno, Pignola and Vaglio Basilicata), Trecchina, Rivello, Nemoli and San Costantino.

== General classification ==
Chart of Romance languages based on structural and comparative criteria, not on socio-functional ones

- Gallo-Italic
  - Piedmontese
  - Ligurian
  - Lombard
    - Western Lombard dialects
    - Eastern Lombard dialects
  - Emilian
  - Romagnol
    - Gallo-Piceno
  - Gallo-Italic of Basilicata
  - Gallo-Italic of Sicily
  - (Venetian)

== Phonology ==
Gallo-Italic languages are often said to resemble Western Romance languages like French, Spanish, or Portuguese, and in large part it is due to their phonology. The Gallo-Italic languages differ somewhat in their phonology from one language to another, but the following are the most important characteristics, as contrasted with Italian:

=== Vowels ===
- Most Gallo-Italic languages have lost all unstressed final vowels except /a/, e.g. Lombard òm "man", füm "smoke", nef "snow", fil "wire", röda "wheel" (Italian uomo, fumo, neve, filo, ruota). They remain, however, in Ligurian, with passage of -o to -u, except after n; e.g. ramu, rami, lüme, lümi "branch, branches, light, lights" (Italian ramo, rami, lume, lumi), but can, chen /kaŋ, keŋ/ "dog, dogs" (Italian cane, cani).
- u /u/ tends to evolve as ü /y/, as in French and Occitan, as in Lombard füm (Italian fumo "smoke") and Ligurian lüme, Piedmont lüm (Italian lume "light"). In some parts, e.g. southern Piedmont, this has further developed into /i/, e.g. fis (Italian fuso), lim (Italian lume "light"). In some mountainous parts of Piedmont, however (e.g. Biellese, Ossolano), this development was blocked before final /a/, leading to masculine crü (Italian crudo "raw") but feminine cru(v)a (Italian cruda).
- Metaphony is very common, affecting original open stressed è /ɛ/ and ò /ɔ/ when followed by /i/ or sometimes /o/ (operating before final vowels were dropped). This leads at first to diphthongs ie and uo, but in many dialects these progress further, typically to monophthongs i and ö /ø/. Unlike standard Italian diphthongization, this typically operates both in open and closed syllables, hence in Lombardy (where typically /i/ but not /o/ triggers metaphony) quest (Italian questo "this") vs. quist (Italian questi "these").
- Stressed closed é /e/ and sometimes ó /o/, when occurring in an open syllable (followed by at most one consonant) often diphthongized to /ei/ and /ou/, as in Old French; e.g. Piedmont beive (Italian bere < *bévere "to drink"), teila (Italian tela "cloth"), meis (Italian mese "month"). In some dialects, /ei/ developed further into either /ɛ/ or /i/, e.g. tèla /tɛla/ < *teila (Italian tela "cloth"), sira (Italian sera "evening"), mis (Italian mese "month").
- Stressed /a/ in an open syllable often fronts to ä /æ/ or è /ɛ/.

=== Consonants ===
- Lenition affects single consonants between vowels. /d/ and /ɡ/ drop; /b/ becomes /v/ or drops; /t/ and /k/ become /d/ and /ɡ/, or drop; /p/ becomes /b/, /v/, or drops. /s/ between vowels voices to /z/. /l/ between vowels sometimes becomes /r/, and this /r/ sometimes drops. Double consonants are reduced to single consonants, but not otherwise lenited. /n/ becomes velarized to /ŋ/. These changes occur before a final vowel drops. After loss of final vowels, however, further changes sometimes affect the newly final consonants, with voiced obstruents often becoming voiceless, and final /ŋ/ sometimes dropping. Liguria, especially in former times, showed particularly severe lenition, with total loss of intervocalic /t/, /d/, /ɡ/, /b/, /v/, /l/, /r/ (probably also /p/, but not /k/) in Old Genoese, hence müa (Latin matura "early"), a éia e âe? (Italian aveva le ali? "did it have wings?"; modern a l'aveiva e ae? with restoration of various consonants due to Italian influence). In Liguria and often elsewhere, collapse of adjacent vowels due to loss of an intervocalic consonant produced new long vowels, notated with a circumflex.
- /k/ and /ɡ/ preceding /i/, /e/ or /ɛ/ often assibilitated historically to /s/ and /z/, respectively. This typically does not occur in Lombardy, however, and parts of Liguria have intermediate /ts/ and /dz/, while Piemontese varieties typically have differential developments, with /k/ assibilating (sent /sɛŋt/ '100'), but /ɡ/ retaining palatalization (gent /dʒɛŋt/ 'people').
- Latin /kl/ palatalized to /tʃ/ (Piemontese ciav, Romagnol ceva 'key'); similarly /ɡj/ from Latin /ɡl/ develops as /dʒ/. In Liguria, /pj/ and /bj/ from Latin /pl/ and /bl/ are affected in the same way, e.g. Ligurian cian (Italian piano "soft") and giancu (Italian bianco "white").
- Latin /kt/ develops into /jt/, /tʃ/ or /t/, varying by locale (contrast Italian /tt/).

=== Lexical comparison ===
Numbers	Lombard	Istrian	Emilian	Piedmontese	Venetian	Ligurian
1	vyŋ / vœna	uŋ / una	oŋ / ona	yŋ / 'yŋa	uŋ / una	yŋ / yna
2	dy	dui	du / dʌu	dʊi̯/ 'dʊe̯	due / dɔ	dui / duɛ
3	tri	tri	tri / trai	trɛi̯ / trɛ	tri / trɛ	trei / trɛ
4	kwatr	kwatro	kwatr	kwatr	kwatro	kwatrʊ
5	ʃiŋk	siŋkwe	θeŋk	siŋk	siŋkwe	siŋkwɛ
6	ses	seje	sis	ses	sie	sei
7	sɛt	siete	sɛt	sɛt	sɛte	sɛtɛ
8	vɔt	wɔto	ɔt	œt	ɔto	øtʊ
9	nœf	nuve	nov	nœw	nove	nøvɛ
10	des	ʒize	diz	des	dieze	deʒɛ

== Comparisons of the sentence: "She always closes the window before dining." ==
Italian (reference)
(Lei) chiude sempre la finestra prima di cenare.
- (Gallo-Italic)
Bergamasque (Eastern Lombard)
(Lé) La sèra sèmper sö ol balcù prima de senà.
Brescian (Eastern Lombard)
(Lé) La sèra semper sö la finèstra enacc de senà.
Milanese (Western Lombard)
(Lee) la sara semper sü la fenestra inans de zena.
Ludesan (Western Lombard)
lé la sarà semper sü la finèstra inans da disnà.
Piacentine (Emilian)
Le la sära sëimpar sö/sü la finestra (fnestra) prima da diśnä
Bolognese (Emilian)
(Lî) la sèra sänper la fnèstra prémma ed dṡnèr.
Cesenate (Romagnol)
(Lî) la ciöd sèmpar la fnèstra prèmma d' z'nèr.
Riminese (Romagnol)
(Léa) la ciùd sémpre la fnèstra prèima ad z'né.
Pesarese (Gallo-Piceno)
Lìa la chiód sénpre la fnèstra préma d' ć'nè.
Fanese (Gallo-Piceno)
Lìa chìud sèmper la fnestra prima d' c'né.
Piedmontese
(Chila) a sara sempe la fnestra dnans ëd fé sin-a.
Canavese (Piedmontese)
(Chilà) a sera sémper la fnestra doant ëd far sèina.
Ligurian
Lê a særa sénpre o barcón primma de çenâ.
Tabarchin (Ligurian dialect of Sardinia)
Lé a sère fissu u barcun primma de çenò.
Carrarese (transition dialect among Ligurian, Emilian and Tuscan)
Lê al sèr(e)/chiode sènpre la fnestra(paravento) prima de cena.
- (Rhaeto-Romance)
Romansh
Ella clauda/serra adina la fanestra avant ch'ella tschainia.
Friulian
Jê e siere simpri il barcon prin di cenâ.
Gherdëina Ladin
Ëila stluj for l vier dan cené.
Nones (Ladin)
(Ela) la sera semper la fenestra inant zenar. ()
Solander (Ladin)
La sèra sempro (sèmper) la fenèstra prima (danànt) da cenàr.
- (other, for reference)
Venetian
Ła sàra/sèra senpre el balcón vanti senàr/dixnàr.
Trentine
Èla la sèra sèmper giò/zo la fenèstra prima de zenà.
Istriot (Rovignese)
Gila insiera senpro el balcon preîma da senà.
Florentine (Tuscan)
Lei la 'hiude sempre la finestra prima di cenà.
Corsican
Ella chjudi sempri a finestra primma di cenà.
Sardinian
Issa tancat semper sa ventana in antis de si esser chenada.
Neapolitan
Essa abbarrechée sempe 'a fenesta primma ca cene.
Salentino
Quiddhra chiude sèmpre a fenéscia prìma cu mancia te sira.
Sicilian
Idda chiudi sèmpri la finéstra prìma di manciari a la sira.
Perugian
Lia chiud sempre la fnestra prima d' cenè.
French
Elle ferme toujours la fenêtre avant de dîner.
Catalan
(Ella) sempre tanca la finestra abans de sopar.
Aragonese
(Ella) s(i)empre tanca/zarra la finestra/ventana antes de cenar/sopar.
Romanian
(Ea) închide totdeauna fereastra înainte de a cina.
Spanish
(Ella) siempre cierra la ventana antes de cenar.
Latin
(Illa) Claudit semper fenestram antequam cenet.

== See also ==
- Gallo-Italic of Basilicata
- Gallo-Italic of Sicily
- Languages of Italy
- List of languages in Europe
- Romance plurals
- Venetian
- Old Gallo-Italic

== Sources ==
- Bernard Comrie, Stephen Matthews, Maria Polinsky (eds.), The Atlas of languages: the origin and development of languages throughout the world. New York 2003, Facts On File. p. 40.
- Stephen A. Wurm, Atlas of the World's Languages in Danger of Disappearing. Paris 2001, UNESCO Publishing, p. 29.
- Glauco Sanga: La lingua Lombarda, in Koiné in Italia, dalle origini al 500 (Koinés in Italy, from the origin to 1500), Lubrina publisher, Bèrghem
- Studi di lingua e letteratura lombarda offerti a Maurizio Vitale, (Studies in Lombard language and literature) Pisa : Giardini, 1983
- Brevini, Franco – Lo stile lombardo : la tradizione letteraria da Bonvesin da la Riva a Franco Loi / Franco Brevini – Pantarei, Lugan – 1984 (Lombard style: literary tradition from Bonvesin da la Riva to Franco Loi )
- Hull, Geoffrey The Linguistic Unity of Northern Italy and Rhaetia: Historical Grammar of the Padanian Language 2 vols. Sydney: Beta Crucis Editions, 2017.
- Mussafia Adolfo, Beitrag zur kunde der Norditalienischen Mundarten im XV. Jahrhunderte (Wien, 1873)
- Pellegrini, G.B. "I cinque sistemi dell'italoromanzo", in Saggi di linguistica italiana (Turin: Boringhieri, 1975), pp. 55–87.
- Rohlfs, Gerhard, Rätoromanisch. Die Sonderstellung des Rätoromanischen zwischen Italienisch und Französisch. Eine kulturgeschichtliche und linguistische Einführung (Munich: C.H. Beek'sche, 1975), pp. 1–20.
- Canzoniere Lombardo – by Pierluigi Beltrami, Bruno Ferrari, Luciano Tibiletti, Giorgio D'Ilario – Varesina Grafica Editrice, 1970.
