= Gallo-Romance =

Gallo-Romance may refer to:

- Old Gallo-Romance, the Romance language spoken from around 600 to 900 AD
- Gallo-Romance languages, a branch of the Romance language family, which includes in the narrowest sense the langues d'oïl and Franco-Provençal
- Gallo-Roman culture
