= Emilian–Romagnol =

Continuum of Gallo-Italic dialects of Emilia and Romagna, Italy

- Native to: Italy, San Marino
- Region: Primarily Emilia-Romagna, Marche, San Marino
- Native speakers: Unknown (4.4 million population): Sole or prevalent language of 10.5%; Used alongside Italian by 28.3% (2006)
- Language family: Indo-European: Italic; Latino-Faliscan; Romance; Italo-Western; Western Romance; Gallo-Italic; Emilian–Romagnol
- Dialects: Emilian; Gallo-Picene; Romagnol

Language codes
- ISO 639-3: eml – inclusive code (deprecated in 2009); Individual codes: egl – Emilian rgn – Romagnol
- Glottolog: emil1243 Emiliano-Romagnolo
- Linguasphere: 51-AAA-ok
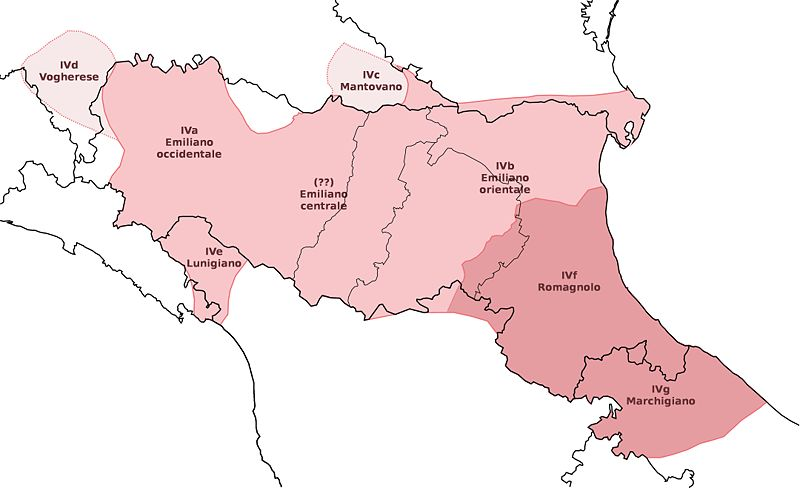
- Emilian Romagnol transition between Emilian and Lombard

Emilian–Romagnol (Italian: emiliano-romagnolo) is a linguistic continuum that is part of the Gallo-Italic languages spoken in the northern Italian region of Emilia-Romagna. It is divided into two main varieties, Emilian and Romagnol.

== Description ==
As part of the Gallo-Italic languages, Emilian–Romagnol is most closely related to the Lombard, Piedmontese and Ligurian languages, all of which are spoken in neighboring regions.

Among other Gallo-Italic languages, Emilian–Romagnol is characterized by systematic raising and diphthongization of Latin stressed vowels in open syllables, as well as widespread syncope of unstressed vowels other than /a/ and use of vowel gradation in the formation of plurals and certain verb tenses.

== Classification ==
While first registered under a single code in ISO standard 639-3, in 2009 this was retired in favour of two distinct codes for the two varieties, due to the cultural and literary split between the two parts of the region, making Emilian and Romagnol distinct ethnolinguistic entities. Since 2015, Emilian and Romagnol are considered, with separated entries, definitely endangered languages according to the UNESCO Atlas of the World's Languages in Danger.

Chart of Romance languages based on structural and comparative criteria

- Emilian
  - Carrarese dialect
  - Lunigianese dialect
  - Tortonese dialect
  - Pavese-Vogherese dialect, Oltrepò dialect
  - Placentine dialect, Bobbiese dialect
  - Modenese dialect, Carpesan dialect, Mirandolese dialect, Frignanese dialect
  - Reggio dialect, Guastallese dialect
  - Parmesan dialect
  - Casalmaggiore-Viadana dialect
  - Mantuan dialect
  - Lower Mantuan dialect
  - Bolognese dialect
    - Bologna city dialect
    - Mid-mountains dialects
    - Upper mountains dialects
    - Northern plains dialects
    - Eastern plains dialects
    - Western plains dialects
  - Ferrarese dialect
    - Comacchio dialect
- Romagnol
  - Ravenna dialect
  - Forlì dialect
  - Cesena dialect
  - Rimini dialect
  - Sammarinese dialect
    - north-eastern (Serravallian)
    - south-western
    - south-eastern
- Gallo-Picene: classification is disputed. While generally considered close to Romagnol, being part of the Gallo-Italic group, some have suggested a third component of Emilian–Romagnol continuum
  - Urbinate dialect
  - Montefeltrin dialect
  - Pesarese dialect
  - Fanese dialect
  - Senigallia dialect
  - Conero Gallo-Italic dialects
  - Upper Tiber transitional dialects

== Sample text ==
Emilian-Romagnol: Tot j essèri umèn i nàs lébri e cumpagn in dignità e dirét. Lou i è dutid ad rasoun e ad cuscinza e i à da operè, ognun ti cunfrunt at ch’j ilt, sa sentimint ad fratelènza.

English: All human beings are born free and equal in dignity and rights. They are endowed with reason and conscience and should act towards one another in a spirit of brotherhood.

Piacentino Dialect	Bolonese Dialect	English
A t' vöi bëin	A t vói bän	I love you
Sì	Sé/ Ói	Yes
No	Nå	No
A t' ringras	A t aringrâz	Thanks
Bon giùran	Bån dé	Good morning
Rvëdas	A se vdrän	Good bye
Me/ Mi	Mé, A	I
E	E	And
Cus al custa/ Quant al custa/ Cus al vegna	Quant véńnel/ Csa cåsstel	How much is it
Cma ta ciamat	Cum t ciâmet?	What's your name
Scüsìm/ Scüsèm	Scuśèm/ Ch'al scûśa bän	Excuse me
Diu	Dìo	God
Lëingua	Längua	Language
Sul	Såul	Sun
Bulogna	Bulåggna	Bologna

== See also ==
- Languages of Italy
