= Massiccio del Sirino =

Mountain in Italy

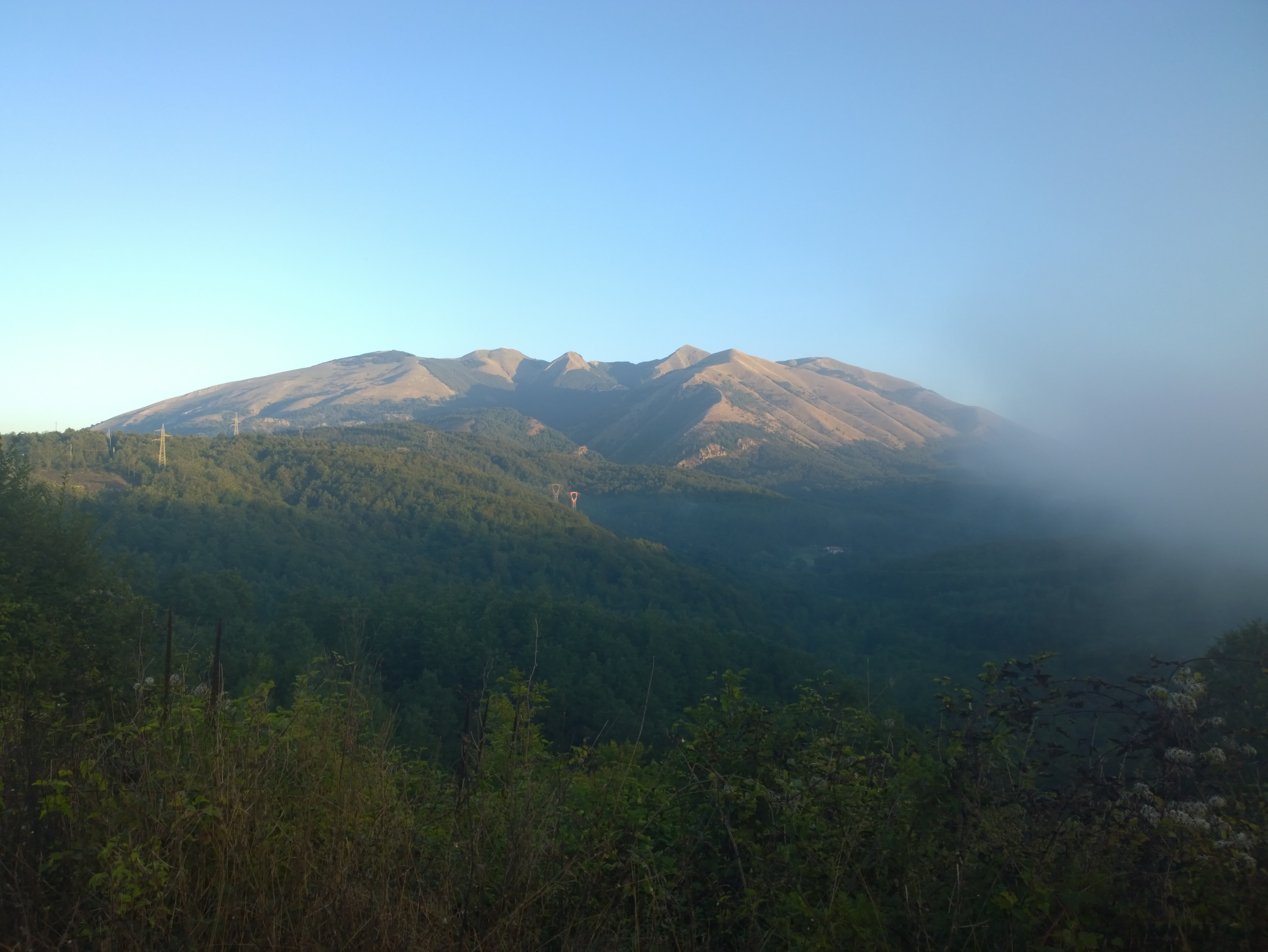
- The massif seen from Lauria.

Highest point
- Elevation: 2,005 m (6,578 ft)
- Prominence: 1,159 m (3,802 ft)
- Listing: Ribu
- Coordinates: 40°07′58″N 15°50′10″E

Geography
- Location: Basilicata, southern Italy
- Parent range: Southern Apennines

Massiccio del Sirino is a massif of Basilicata, southern Italy. The highest peak is Monte Papa, at 2,005 m. It is located in the southern tip of the Appennino Lucano - Val d'Agri - Lagonegrese National Park.

== See also ==
- Lake Sirino
