= Coccovello =

Mountain in Italy

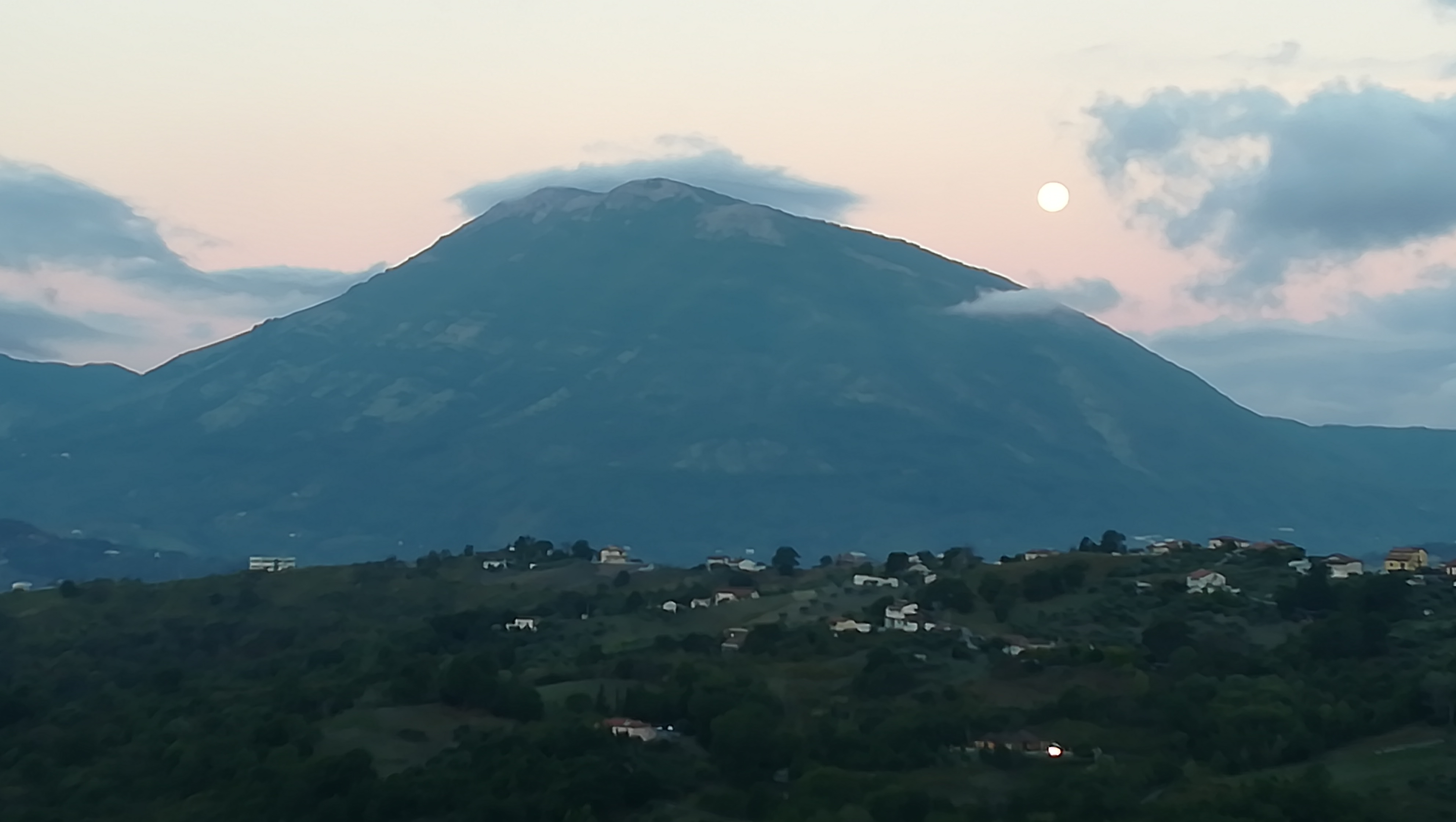

Highest point
- Elevation: 1,505 m (4,938 ft)
- Prominence: 880 m (2,890 ft)
- Coordinates: 40°02′59″N 15°42′57″E

Geography
- Location within Italy
- Location: Basilicata, Italy
- Parent range: Southern Apennines

Coccovello is a mountain of Basilicata, southern Italy and an example of karst topography.
