= Piedmontese language =

Gallo-Italic language spoken in Italy

Piedmontese
- piemontèis
- Pronunciation: [pjemʊŋˈtɛjz]
- Native to: Italy
- Region: Northwest Italy: Piedmont; Liguria; Lombardy; Aosta Valley
- Native speakers: 2,000,000 (2012)
- Language family: Indo-European: Italic; Latino-Faliscan; Latin; Romance; Italo-Western; Western Romance; Gallo-Iberian; Gallo-Romance; Gallo-Italic; Lombard–Piedmontese?; Piedmontese
- Dialects: Judaeo-Piedmontese (†)
- Writing system: Latin

Official status
- Recognised minority language in: Italy: Piedmont

Language codes
- ISO 639-3: pms
- Glottolog: piem1238
- ELP: Piemontese
- Linguasphere: 51-AAA-of
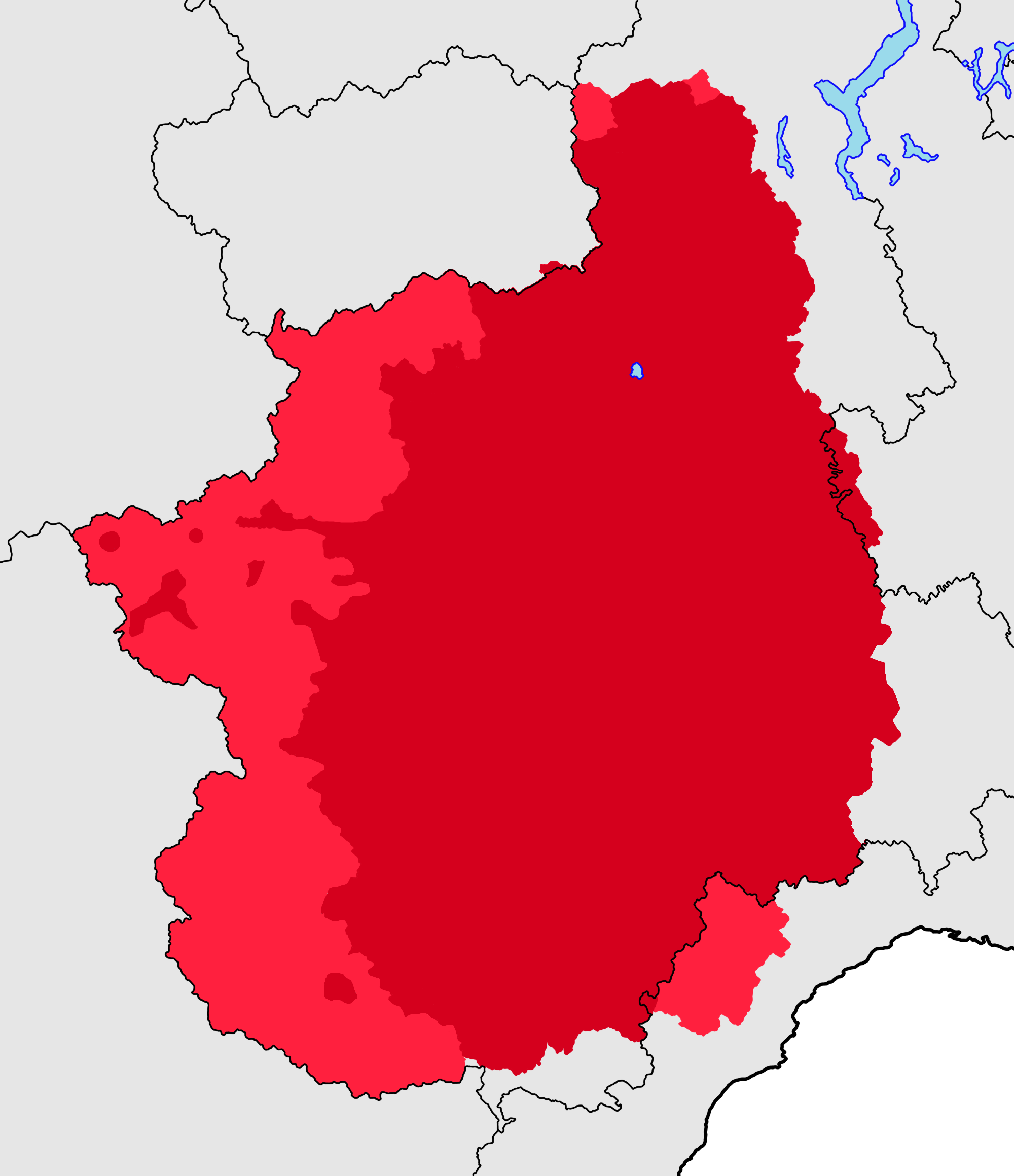
- Piedmontese language distribution in Europe: Areas where Piedmontese is spoken (municipalities where Occitan and Arpitan presence is only de jure are included) Areas where Piedmontese is spoken alongside other languages (Occitan, Arpitan and Alemannic) and areas of linguistic transition (with Ligurian and with Lombard)

- Piedmontese was classified as Definitely Endangered by the UNESCO Atlas of the World's Languages in Danger in 2010.

Piedmontese (English: /ˌpiːd.mɒn.ˈtiːz/ PEED-mon-TEEZ; autonym: piemontèis [pjemʊŋˈtɛjz] or lenga piemontèisa; Italian: piemontese) is a language spoken by some 2,000,000 people mostly in Piedmont, a region of Northwest Italy. Although considered by most linguists a separate language, in Italy it is often mistakenly regarded as an Italian dialect. It is linguistically part of the Gallo-Italic languages group from Northern Italy (with Lombard, Emilian, Ligurian and Romagnol), making it part of the wider western group of Romance languages, which also includes French, Arpitan, Occitan, and Catalan. It is spoken in the core of Piedmont, in northwestern Liguria (near Savona), and in Lombardy (some municipalities in the westernmost part of Lomellina near Pavia).

It has some support from the Piedmont regional government but is considered a dialect rather than a separate language by the Italian central government.

Due to the Italian diaspora Piedmontese has spread in the Argentine Pampas, where many immigrants from Piedmont settled, the Piedmontese language is also spoken in some states of Brazil, alongside the Venetian language.

== Literature ==
The first documents in the Piedmontese language were written in the 12th century, the sermones subalpini, when it was extremely close to Occitan, dating from the 12th century, a document devoted to the education of the Knights Templar stationed in Piedmont.

During the Renaissance, the oldest Piedmontese literary work of secular character, are the works of Zan Zòrs Alion, poet of the duchy of Montferrat, the most famous work being the opera Jocunda.

In the 1500s and 1600s, there were several pastoral comedies with parts in Piedmontese.

In the Baroque period, El Cont Piolèt, a comedy by Giovan Battista Tan-na d'Entraive was published.

Literary Piedmontese developed in the 17th and 18th centuries, but it did not gain literary esteem comparable to that of French or Italian, other languages used in Piedmont. Nevertheless, literature in Piedmontese has never ceased to be produced: it includes poetry, theatre pieces, novels, and scientific work.

== History ==
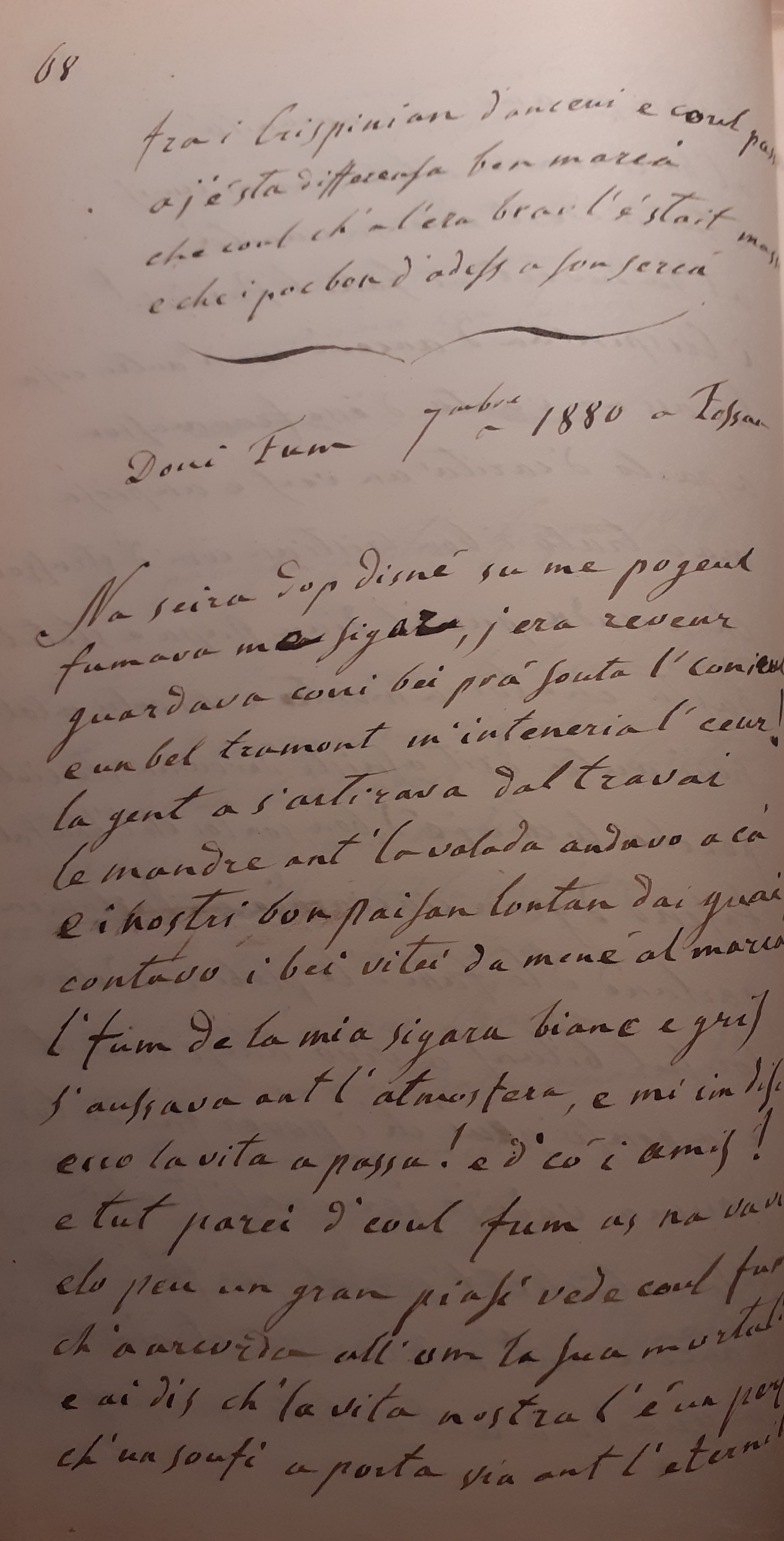
Diary kept in Piedmontese in the 19th century by Giacinto Tholosano, Barone di Valgrisanche

The first documents in the Piedmontese language were written in the 12th century, the sermones subalpini, when it was extremely close to Occitan.

=== Current status ===
In 2004, Piedmontese was recognised as Piedmont's regional language by the regional parliament, although the Italian government has not yet recognised it as such. In theory, it is now supposed to be taught to children in school, but this is happening only to a limited extent.

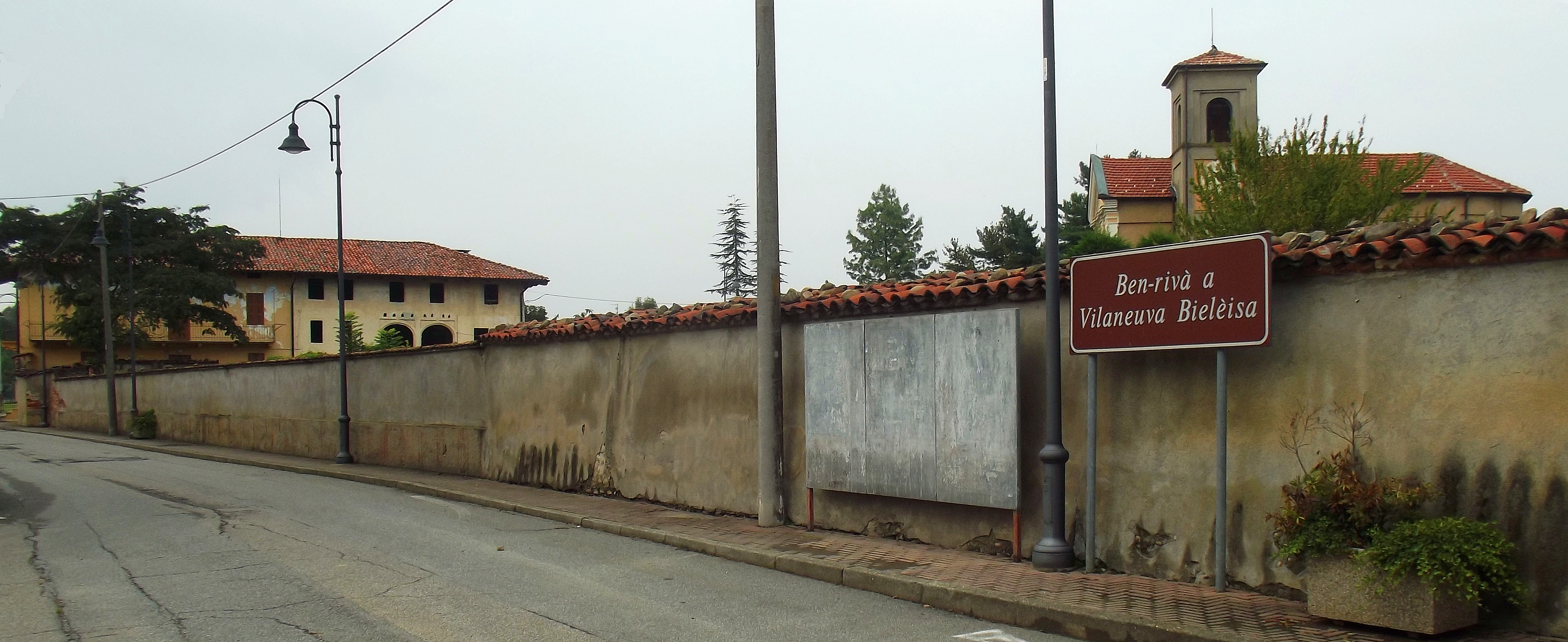
Welcome sign in Villanova Biellese / Vilaneuva Bielèisa in Piedmontese

The last decade has seen the publication of learning materials for schoolchildren, as well as general-public magazines. Courses for people already outside the education system have also been developed. In spite of these advances, the current state of Piedmontese is quite grave, as over the last 150 years the number of people with a written active knowledge of the language has shrunk to about 2% of native speakers, according to a recent survey. On the other hand, the same survey showed Piedmontese is still spoken by over half the population, alongside Italian. Authoritative sources confirm this result, putting the figure between 2 million and 3 million speakers out of a population of 4.2 million people. Efforts to make it one of the official languages of the Turin 2006 Winter Olympics were unsuccessful.

== Dialects ==
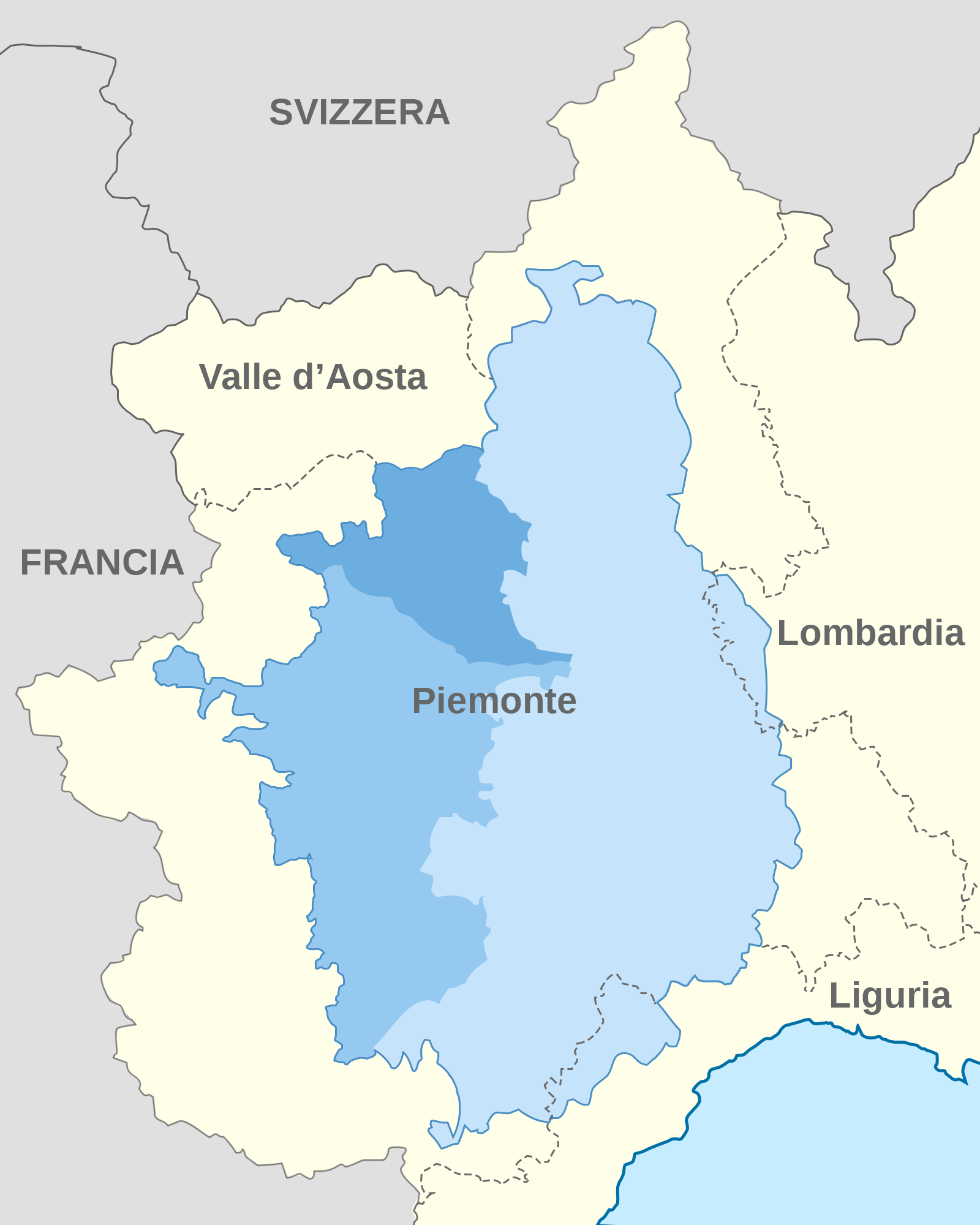
Geographical variants of Piedmontese

Piedmontese is divided into three major groups

- Western, which include the dialects of Turin and Cuneo.
- Eastern, which in turn is divided into south-eastern (Astigiano, Roero, Monregalese, High Montferrat, Langarolo, Alessandrino) and north-eastern (Low Montferrat, Biellese, Vercellese, Valsesiano).
- Canavese, spoken in the Canavese region in north-western Piedmont.

The variants can be detected in the variation of the accent and variation of words. It is sometimes difficult to understand a person that speaks a different Piedmontese from the one you are used to, as the words or accents are not the same.

=== Eastern and western group ===
The Eastern Piedmontese group is phonologically more innovative than its Western counterpart.

Words that in the West end in jt, jd or t in the East end in [dʒ] or [tʃ], for example Western [lajt], [tyjt], and [vɛj] (milk, all and old) correspond to Eastern [lɑtʃ], [tytʃ] and [vɛdʒ].

A typical Eastern feature is [i] as an allophone of /e/: at word end, at the end of verbal infinitives, as in "to read" and "to be" (Western [leze], [ese] vs. Eastern [lezi], [esi]) and in feminine plurals. Nevertheless, this development is also shared partially (in the case of the infinitive) by most Western dialects, including that of Turin, which is the most spoken dialect of Western Piedmontese and also of the whole language.

A morphological feature that sharply divides the East from the West is the indicative imperfect conjugation of irregular verbs. In the East, the suffix -ava/iva is used, while in the West, the corresponding suffix is -asìa/isìa. The groups are also distinguished by differing conjugations of the present simple of irregular verbs: dé, andé, sté (to give, to go, to stay).

English	eastern			western		
	to give	to go	to stay	to give	to go	to stay
I	dagh	vagh	stagh	don	von	ston
you	dè	vè	stè	das	vas	stas
he/she/it	da	va	sta	da	va	sta
we	doma	andoma	stoma	doma	andoma	stoma
you	déj	andéj	stéj	deve	andeve	steve
they	dan	van	stan	dan	van	stan

=== Judeo-Piedmontese ===
A variety of Piedmontese was Judeo-Piedmontese, a dialect spoken by the Piedmontese Jews until the Second World War, when most were killed during the Holocaust. Some survivors knew the language but as of 2015, the language had nearly gone extinct. It had many loanwards from Provencal, Spanish and Hebrew. It kept many conservative features that Piedmontese abandoned over time. The language never became as large in terms of words as larger Jewish languages like Yiddish, and it never developed a standardized writing system.

== Phonology ==
=== Consonants ===
		Labial	Dental/ Alveolar	Post- alveolar	Palatal	Velar
Stop	voiceless	p	t			k
Stop	voiced	b	d			ɡ
Affricate	voiceless			t͡ʃ		
Affricate	voiced			d͡ʒ		
Fricative	voiceless	f	s			
Fricative	voiced	v	z			
Nasal		m	n		ɲ	ŋ
Trill			r			
Approximant			l		j	w

/v/ is realized as labio-velar [w] between /a/ and /u/ and as [w] or [f] when in word-final position.

=== Vowels ===
	Front		Central	Back
Close	i	y		u
Mid	e	ø	ə	
Mid	ɛ		ə	ɔ
Open			a	

Allophones of /a/ are [ɑ, ɒ] in stressed syllables and as [ɐ] when in unstressed position and at end of the word.

=== Phonological processes ===
- Apocope, i.e., dropping of all of the unstressed vowels at word end, except /a/, which is usually centralized to [ɐ].
- Syncope i.e., weakening or dropping of unstressed pro-tonic and post-tonic vowels: /me'luŋ/ > /mə'luŋ/ > /m'luŋ/, same happens in French, and other Gallo-Romance languages. In some cases, prothesis of [ə] or [ɐ] is also present to make some consonant clusters easier to pronounce (ex. novod, "nephew", [nʊˈvud] > [nvud] > [ɐnˈvud], this feature is also present in Emilian.
- Nasalization of vowels in front of /n/, as in Western Romance, and then shift of nasalization from the vowel to /n/ with development of the /ŋn/ cluster, and subsequent dropping of [n] (/'buna/> /'bũna/> /'buŋna/ > /'buŋa/).
- Development of vowels /ø/ and /y/ from [ɔ] and [uː] of Latin, respectively.
- Consonantal degemination: SERRARE > saré.
- Latin groups of occlusives [kt] and [gd] become [jd]-, as in Gallo-Romance: NOCTEM > neuit [nøi̯d]; LACTEM > làit [lɑi̯d]. Some dialects have reached the more advanced stage, with palatalization of [i̯d] to [d͡ʒ] (for example Vercelli dialect [nød͡ʒ] and [lad͡ʒ]), as happens in Spanish and Occitan.
- Palatization of [kl] and [gl] : Latin CLARUS > ciàr [tʃɑi̯r], "light", GLANDIA > gianda [ˈdʒɑŋdɐ] "nut".
- The Latin unvoiced occlusive /p/, /t/, /k/, are voiced (becoming /b/, /d/, /g/), and then lenited and usually drop: FORMICAM > formìa; APRILEM > avril, CATHÉDRA > careja.
- Latin /k/-/g/ before front vowels, became post-alveolar affricates /t͡ʃ/ and /d͡ʒ/, then /t͡s/ and /d͡z/ due to typical Western Romance assibilation, later /t͡s/ and /d͡z/ became fricatives: /s/ and /z/: CINERE > sënner; CENTUM > sent; GINGIVA > zanziva.

== Alphabet ==
Piedmontese is written with a modified Latin alphabet. The letters, along with their IPA equivalent, are shown in the table below.

Letter	IPA value	Letter	IPA value	Letter	IPA value
A a	/a/, [ɑ]	H h	∅	P p	/p/
B b	/b/	I i	/i/ or (semivocalic) /j/	Q q	/k/ (Note: Always before u.)
C c	/k/ or /tʃ/ (Note: Before i, e or ë, c and g represent /tʃ/ and /dʒ/, respectively.)	J j	/j/	R r	/r/~/ɹ/
D d	/d/	L l	/l/	S s	/s/, /z/ (Note: s is voiced [z] between vowels, at the end of words, immediately before nasal/voiced consonants.)
E e	/e/ or /ɛ/ (Note: e is /e/ in closed syllables and /e/ or /ɛ/ in open syllables.)	M m	/m/	T t	/t/
Ë ë	/ə/	N n	/n/ or /ŋ/ (Note: Before consonants and at the end of words, n represents the velar nasal /ŋ/.)	U u	/y/, or (semivocalic) /w/, /ʊ̯/
F f	/f/	O o	/ʊ/, /u/ or (semivocalic), /ʊ̯/	V v	/v/, /ʋ/, or /w/ (Note: v is generally /v/, /ʋ/ before dental consonants and between vowels, /w/ ([f] by some speakers) at the end of words.)
G g	/ɡ/ or /dʒ/	Ò ò	/ɔ/	Z z	/z/

Certain digraphs are used to regularly represent specific sounds as shown below.

Digraph	IPA value	Digraph	IPA value	Digraph	IPA value
gg	/dʒ/	gh	/ɡ/	cc	/tʃ/
gli	/ʎ/ (Note: Represents /ʎ/ in some Italian loanwords.)	ss	/s/	gn	/ɲ/
sc	/sk/, /stʃ/	sc, scc	/stʃ/	eu	/ø/
		sg, sgg	/zdʒ/		

All other combinations of letters are pronounced as written. Grave accent marks stress (except for ⟨o⟩ which, when stressed, is written with an acute ⟨ó⟩ to avoid confusion with ⟨ò⟩, which is never stressed); grave accent also breaks diphthongs, so ua is /wa/ and uà is /ˈwa/, while ùa is pronounced separately, /ˈy.a/.

== Characteristics ==
Some of the characteristics of the Piedmontese language are:

1. The presence of clitic so-called verbal pronouns for subjects, which give a Piedmontese verbal complex the following form: (subject) + verbal pronoun + verb, as in (mi) i von 'I go'. Verbal pronouns are absent only in the imperative form.
2. The bound form of verbal pronouns, which can be connected to dative and locative particles (a-i é 'there is', i-j diso 'I say to him').
3. The interrogative form, which adds an enclitic interrogative particle at the end of the verbal form (Veus-to…? 'Do you want to...?'])
4. The absence of ordinal numerals higher than 'sixth', so that 'seventh' is col che a fà set 'the one which makes seven'.
5. The existence of three affirmative interjections (that is, three ways to say yes): si, sè (from Latin sic est, as in Italian); é (from Latin est, as in Portuguese); òj (from Latin hoc est, as in Occitan, or maybe hoc illud, as in Franco-Provençal, French and Old Catalan and Occitan).
6. The absence of the voiceless postalveolar fricative /ʃ/ (like the sh in English sheep), for which an alveolar S sound (as in English sun) is usually substituted.
7. The existence of an S-C combination pronounced [stʃ].
8. The existence of a velar nasal [ŋ] (like the ng in English going), which usually precedes a vowel, as in lun-a 'moon'.
9. The existence of the third Piedmontese vowel Ë, which is very short (close to the vowel in English sir).
10. The absence of the phonological contrast that exists in Italian between short (single) and long (double) consonants, for example, Italian fata 'fairy' and fatta 'done (F)'.
11. The existence of a prosthetic Ë sound when consonantal clusters arise that are not permitted by the phonological system. So 'seven stars' is pronounced set ëstèile (cf. stèile 'stars').

Piedmontese has a number of varieties that may vary from its basic koiné to quite a large extent. Variation includes not only departures from the literary grammar, but also a wide variety in dictionary entries, as different regions maintain words of Frankish or Lombard origin, as well as differences in native Romance terminology. Words imported from various languages are also present, while more recent imports tend to come from France and from Italian.

== Vocabulary ==
=== Numbers ===
number	piedmontese	number	piedmontese	number	piedmontese	number	piedmontese
1	un	11	ondes	30	tranta	200	dosent
2	doi (m), doe (f)	12	dodes	40	quaranta	300	tersent
3	trei	13	terdes	50	sinquanta	400	quatsent
4	quatr	14	quatordes	60	sessanta	500	sinchsent
5	sinch	15	quindes	70	stanta	600	sessent
6	ses	16	sedes	80	otanta	700	setsent
7	set	17	disset	90	novanta	800	eutsent
8	eut	18	diseut	100	sent	900	neuvsent
9	neuv	19	disneuv	101	sent e un	1000	mila
10	des	20	vint	110	sentdes		

=== Lexical comparison ===
Lexical comparison with other Romance languages and English:

	Gallo-Italic and Venetian				Occitano-Romance		Occitano- and Ibero-Romance	Gallo-Romance		Italo-Dalmatian		Ibero-Romance		Eastern Romance
English	Piedmontese	Ligurian	Emilian	Venetian	Occitan	Catalan	Aragonese	Arpitan	French	Sicilian	Italian	Spanish	Portuguese	Romanian
chair	cadrega/ careja	carêga	scrâna	carèga	cadièra	cadira	silla	cheyére	chaise	sìeggia	sedia	silla	cadeira	scaun, catedră
to take	pijé/ciapé	pigiâ/ciapà	ciapèr	ciapar	prene, agafar	agafar, agarrar, replegar	agafar, replegar	prendre/acrapar	prendre	pigghiàri	prendere, pigliare	coger, tomar, pillar	pegar, tomar	a lua
to go/come out	surtì/seurte	sciortì	sortìr	isìr/sortir	sortir, sal(h)ir, eissir	sortir/eixir	salir, sallir, ixir, salldre	sortir/salyir	sortir, issir	nèsciri	uscire	salir	sair	a ieși
to fall	droché/tombé	càzze	crodèr	cajar	caire/tombar	caure	cayer, caire	chèdre	tomber, choir	càriri	cadere, cascare	caer, tumbar	cair, tombar	cădere
home	ca/meison	ca	ca	caxa/cà	casa/meison	ca/casa	casa	mêson/cà	maison	casa	casa	casa	casa	casă
arm	brass	brasso	brâs	bras	braç	braç	braço	brès	bras	vrazzu	braccio	brazo	braço	braț
number	nùmer	nùmero	nómmer	nùmaro	nòmbre	nombre	número	nombro	nombre/numéro	nùmmuru	numero	número	número	număr
name	nòm	nòme	nóm	nòme	nom	nom	nombre, nom	nom	nom	nomu	nome	nombre	nome	nume
apple	pom	méia/póma	pàm	pómo	poma	poma, maçana	maçana, poma	poma	pomme	muma/mela	mela	manzana	maçã	măr
to work	travajé	travagiâ	lavorè	travajar	trabalhar	treballar	treballar	travalyér	travailler	travagghiari	lavorare	trabajar	trabalhar	a lucra
bat (animal)	ratavolòira	ràttopenûgo	papastrel	signàpola/nòtoła	ratapenada	ratpenat, moricec	moriziego, moricec	rata volage	chauve-souris	taddarita	pipistrello	murciélago	morcego	liliac
school	ëscòla	schêua	scöa	scóła	escòla	escola	escuela, escola	ècuola	école	scola	scuola	escuela	escola	școală
wood (land)	bòsch	bòsco	bòsch	bósco	bosc	bosc	bosque	bouesc	bois	voscu	bosco	bosque	bosque	pădure
Mr. (Mister)	monsù	sciô	sior	siór	sénher	senyor	sinyor	monsior	monsieur	gnuri	signore	señor	senhor, seu	domn
Mrs. (Misses/Missus)	madama	sciâ	siora	sióra	sénhera	senyora	sinyora	madama	madame	gnura	signora	señora	senhora, dona	doamnă
summer	istà	istà	istê	istà	estiu	estiu	verano	étif	été	astati	estate	verano, estío	verão, estio	vară
yesterday	jer	vêi	iêr	jéri	gèr/ier	ahir	ahiere	hièr	hier	aìeri	ieri	ayer	ontem	ieri
today	ancheuj	ancheu	incō	incò	uèi/ancuei	avui/hui	hue	enqu'houè	aujourd'hui	ùoggi	oggi	hoy	hoje	azi
tomorrow	dman	domân	dmân	domàn	deman	demà	manyana, deman, maitín	deman	demain	rumani	domani	mañana	amanhã	mâine
English	Piedmontese	Ligurian	Emilian	Venetian	Occitan	Catalan	Aragonese	Arpitan	French	Sicilian	Italian	Spanish	Portuguese	Romanian
Sunday	dominica/domigna	dumenega	dumenica	doménega	dimenge	diumenge	dominge	demenge	dimanche	rumìnica	domenica	domingo	domingo	duminică
Monday	lùn-es	lunesdì	munedé	luni	diluns	dilluns	luns	delon	lundi	lunidìa	lunedì	lunes	segunda-feira	luni
Tuesday	màrtes	mâtesdì	martedé	marti	dimars	dimarts	març	demârs	mardi	màrtiri	martedì	martes	terça-feira	marți
Wednesday	mèrcol	mâcordì	mercordé	mèrcore	dimècres	dimecres	miercres	demécro	mercredi	mèrcuri	mercoledì	miércoles	quarta-feira	miercuri
Thursday	giòbia	zéuggia	giovedé	zòba	dijòus	dijous	jueus	dejo	jeudi	iòviri	giovedì	jueves	quinta-feira	joi
Friday	vënner	venardì	venerdé	vénare	divendres	divendres	viernes	devendro	vendredi	viènniri	venerdì	viernes	sexta-feira	vineri
Saturday	saba	sabbò	sâbet	sabo	dissabte	dissabte	sabado	dessandro	samedi	sabbatu	sabato	sábado	sábado	sâmbătă
