= Rivello =

Town and comune in Italy

- Comune
- Comune di Rivello
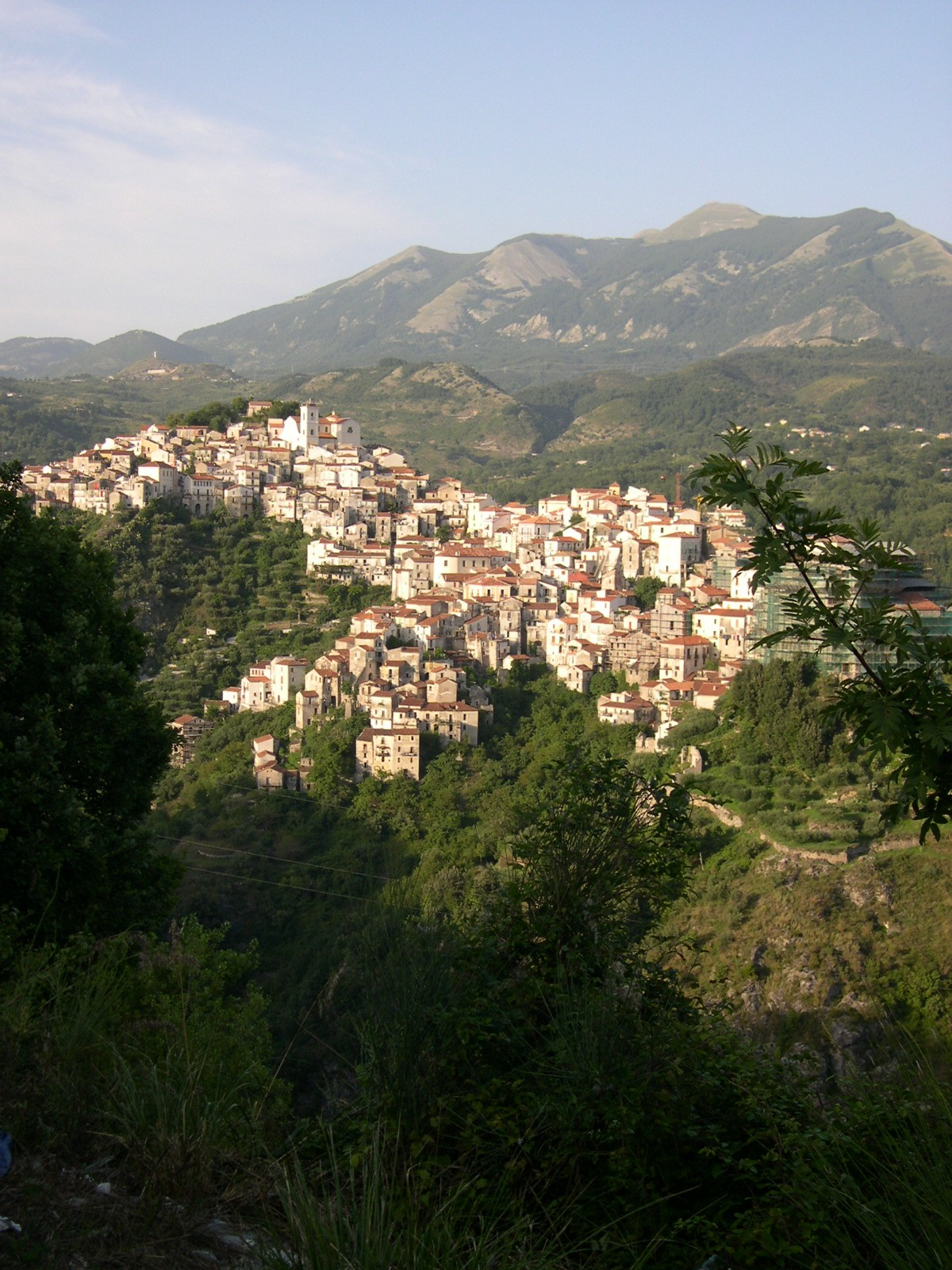
- View of Rivello

- Location within Italy Location within Basilicata
- Coordinates: 40°5′N 15°46′E
- Country: Italy
- Region: Basilicata
- Province: Potenza (PZ)
- Frazioni: Rotale, San Costantino, Vignale-Santa Margherita, Medichetta, Sorba, Sovereto, Fiumicello, Asprina, Samprena

Area
  - Total: 68 km^{2} (26 sq mi)
- Elevation: 479 m (1,572 ft)

Population (March 2024)
  - Total: 2,515
  - Density: 37/km^{2} (96/sq mi)
- Demonym: Rivellesi
- Time zone: UTC+1 (CET)
  - Summer (DST): UTC+2 (CEST)
- Postal code: 85040
- Dialing code: 0973
- ISTAT code: 076068
- Patron saint: san Nicola di Bari
- Saint day: 6 December
- Website: Official website

Rivello (Rëviell in the rivellese dialect) is a town and comune in the province of Potenza, in the Southern Italian region of Basilicata. The population was 2,515 as of March 2024.

== Geography ==
=== Territory ===
The town sits at a median 479 meters above sea level. The comune extends for 68 square km, bordering Casaletto Spartano and Lagonegro to the north, Nemoli to the east, Maratea and Trecchina to the south, and Sapri to the west.

=== Climate ===
The closest weather station is that of Maratea. Based on weather reports from 1961–1990, the lowest average temperature is in January at 8.7 °C, while the highest is in August at 23.4 °C.

== History ==
The origins of the city begin in the Early Middle Ages. However, many archaeological finds suggest that Rivello is the successor to a Lucanian city of Sirios, predating the pre-Roman period. It is well-known that starting from the Middle ages, the city was divided into two-quarters: the upper quarter, whose inhabitants, the bardàv'ti, were tied to the Latin Catholic church (San Nicola di Bari), and the lower quarter, whose inhabitants, the bardàsci, were followers of the Greek rite parish (Santa Maria del Poggio).

References to the two ethic groups still persist today in the toponymy of the city such as "Fonte dei Lombardi" and "Piazza dei Greci". The Lombards, who settled following the barbarian invasions, and the Greeks, who came from the nearby Velia after its destruction by the Saracens. It is said that the modern name Rivello or Re-Velia derives from this.

In fact, the motto of the comune is still "Iterum Velia renovata Revellum" (Once Velia, renewed as Rivello). Another possible etymological origin of the name is found in the formation of the iterative type "Re + Vallare," meaning to fortify again, from which a late Latin revallo might have led, through the vowel shift A>E, to the form Rivello.

The 18th Century was Rivello's most prosperous, leading to a strong immigration that lead to a notable population increase, as evidenced by the ecclesiastical archives. Unfortunately, the arrival of the French caused a decline due to the uncertainties of the times. Following the Congress of Vienna and the Bourbon Reforms, there were signs of recovery; but fate had already been sealed. With the arrival of the Piedomontese, after the establishment of the Kingdom of Italy, the choices of the first governments, brigandage, poverty, and lack of work forced hundreds of Rivellese (as in the entire central-southern region of Italy) to emigrate to the Americas in search for a better fortune.

After WWII, emigration resumed but this time towards northern Italy (particularly Lombardy), Germany, Switzerland, France, and Belgium. This trend was especially pronounced between the late 1950s and mid-1970s.
