= Gian Carlo Passeroni =

Italian writer (1713–1803)

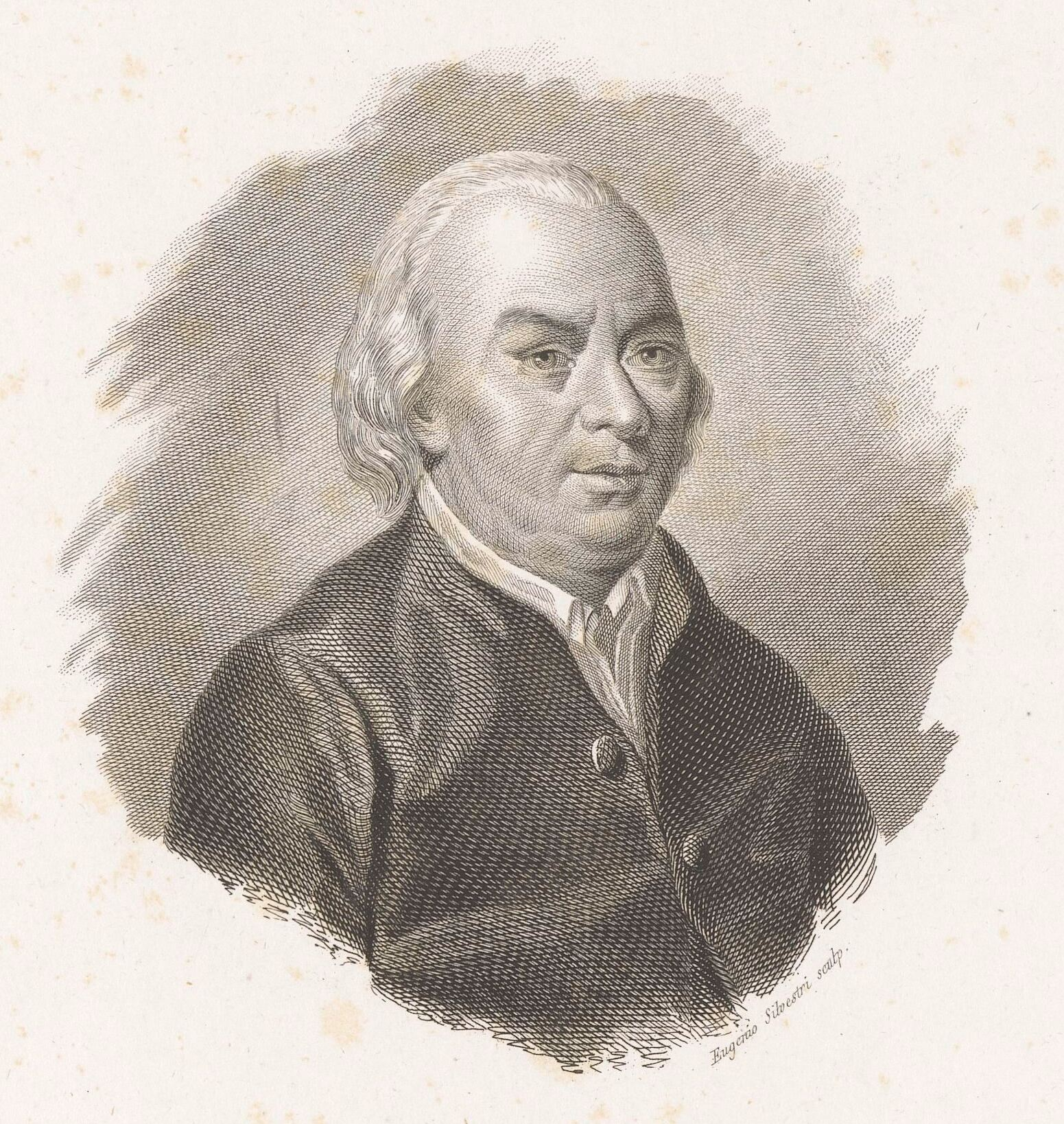
Gian Carlo Passeroni

Gian Carlo Passeroni (8 March 1713 – 26 December 1803) was an Italian satirical poet, the most important of the 18th-century Nice poets. He was an ordained priest and for much of his career lived an ascetic life in Milan. He is best known for his lengthy satirical poem II Cicerone.

== Early years and education ==
Passeroni was born in 1713 in Condamine di Lantosca, a small settlement in the County of Nice, then part of the Kingdom of Sardinia. His family were not rich, but at 14 he was invited to study in Milan at the Jesuits College of Brera with an uncle who was a priest. After completing his studies, he was ordained and celebrated his first mass in Condamine.

== Literary career ==
Returning to Milan, he concentrated on literary studies, becoming sufficiently famous for his learning that the Lucini family appointed him tutor to the young Marquess Cesare Alberico Lucini. Passeroni and the Lucini family formed a warm friendship and they sponsored his education and his writing of poetry. In 1743, with Count Giuseppe Maria Imbonati, he revived the Accademia dei Trasformati, an intellectual society, and the following year accompanied his pupil to continue his studies in Rome. Eight months later, he returned to Milan.

In 1759, Passeroni followed his former pupil Lucini, who had been elevated to titular archbishop of Nicaea, to Cologne, where he had been appointed papal nuncio. However, while still young, he resigned his position as his chaplain and returned once more in Milan, where he lived in intentionally frugal and humble circumstances. He lived in a cellar with only a rooster as a companion, thread-bare clothing and minimal furniture. He refused help from friends, and around 1758, he had refused a chair at the University of Padua. After 1770, he suffered various economic hardships, which both the Austrian government of Maria Theresa and the Napoleonic government of the Cisalpine Republic in Italy attempted to alleviate with financial assistance. In thanks for the pension he received from the Italian Republic, he had his unpublished poetry bound in a volume which he dedicated to Vice President Melzi d'Eril. A few years before his death in 1803, Napoleon appointed him a member of the Istituto Nazionale. However, he continued to live simply in the cellar until his death in 1803.

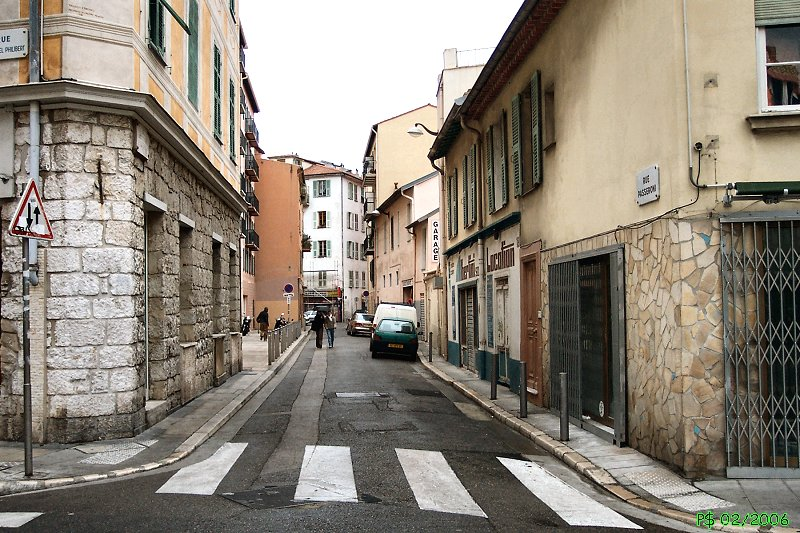
Rue Passeroni in Nice

== Works ==
Il Cicerone, the work for which he is best known, was published in six volumes in Milan between 1755 and 1774. He began composing it before 1743, and had already recited parts of it to literary audiences during his time in Rome. Consisting of 101 octave cantos and divided into three parts, it purports to be a biography of Cicero, a Roman orator, but contains lengthy satirical and ironic digressions in which he rails at fortune and the society of his own century. The language is unaffected and the tone bantering. Some of the topics covered are "portrait painting, amorous poetry, economy and extravaganza, loose conversations, theater, musicians, antiquaries, painters and so forth". The work is compared to Laurence Sterne's The Life and Opinions of Tristram Shandy, Gentleman.

Passeroni also wrote Epigrammi greci (Greek epigrams), published in Milan in 1786, Favole Esopiane (Fables of Aesop), published in Milan in seven volumes in 1780–86, and Rime giocose, satiriche e morali (Amusing, satirical and moral rhymes), published in 1776.

== Legacy ==
He was admired in his lifetime for his pious and simple way of life. Giuseppe Parini, the Italian Enlightenment satirist and poet, stated that he owed the formation of his own style to Passeroni. Rue Passeroni in Nice is named in his honour.

== Works ==
- Passeroni, Gian Carlo (1764). Il Cicerone: poema (in Italian). Stamperia Remondini.
