= Sashka (poem) =

Poem by Mikhail Lermontov

Sashka is a poem by Mikhail Lermontov, written in 1835–1836 and first published by Pavel Viskovatov in No. 1, 1882, issue of Russkaya Mysl magazine. Belonging to the so-called "Ironic cycle" (alongside "The Fairytale for Children" and "Tambov Treasurer's Wife"), it is one of Lermontov's largest poems, containing 149 stanzas (11 lines each, written partly in dactylic pentameter, partly in modified Ottava rima format). The poem, with its sharp criticism of the contemporary Russian society, marked a radical detour from Lermontov's earlier romantic verses. Critics see it as a pivotal point in Lermontov's development as a realist and as a huge step from earlier, mostly derivative works towards his masterpiece A Hero of Our Time.

== Synopsis ==
Sashka, whom the author refers to as his "best friend", makes his way to a house at Presnya, a brothel-type place, where he has sex with his beau, a Jewish girl Tizra. Fascinated by the story of a high society party he's just been to, the latter suggests that her lover takes her to one, introducing her as a rich noble girl. He agrees. As Sashka falls asleep, the narrator relates his life story, some details of which correspond with those of Lermontov (the French governor's characteristics were later reproduced in some biographies). Upon awakening, the young man goes home, receives financial aid from his aunt and gives money with some instructions (the nature of which remains unknown) to his black servant who also appears to be his friend.

== History ==
For the first time, fragments of the poem (verses: 1–3, 5, 12–14, 27–28, 32, 45) were published by Pyotr Yefremov in Bibliograficheskye Zapiski (Bibliographical Notes, No. 18, 1861). These belonged to the so-called "Chicherin notebook" - a collection of verses and sketches written by Lermontov before his first exile and belonging to B.N. Chicherin. Judging by the first verses of this original rough copy, the author's initial intention was to write about his own adventures ("Sure, my predecessors' paths are slippery / And yet I'm eager to publish my own tale"). Having changed his mind, Lermontov re-worked Verses 1–4 and made his "best friend" the poem's central figure. Both versions relate to one particular plotline, concerning the "house in Presnya" where Tirza and several other women abide. Another one, dealing with Sashka's childhood, youth, his first love, has been worked upon in another notebook of Lermontov, the so-called "Geography lectures", dated 1835. In the final 1836 version both stories got merged.

Pavel Viskovatov, who published Sashka in 1882, received the manuscript from Penza literary collector, merchant I.A.Panafutin whose father was a land-surveyor at Lermontov's relative P.P.Shan-Girey's estate. This original manuscript got lost but, judging by the quality of the Russkaya Mysl, publication was seriously flawed and full of misspellings; Viskovatov re-written fragments that he found either unreadable or unsuitable for publication. Some cuts were made by censors. In 1887, N.N. Bukovsky, the keeper of Lermontov Museum in the Saint Petersburg Junkers College, came up with a checked-up, revised version which was later used in Abramovich's The Complete Lermontov (1914, 1916) and in the 1939 Academia publication.

There has been a lasting controversy as to whether Sashka was a finished work or just the first chapter of a larger poem. Originally, nine verses of the unfinished "Chapter 2" were added by Viskovatov to the original text. Boris Eichenbaum was the first to suggested them to be the beginning of another poem, and since then it has been agreed that Sashka was a complete piece of work, Verse 149 being its last.

=== Date controversy ===
The poem was written in 1835–1836. Pavel Viskovatov in his "Biography" quotes Lermontov's relative A.P. Shan-Girey's words: "It was then [in January–February, 1836] that Lermontov in Tarkhany started the poem "Sashka", based upon disparate sketches he'd made earlier." Certain details of the plot also point to that particular period. "One of these days we are awaiting the Comet / That brings the end to all the world", - these two lines must be relating to the Halley's Comet which had been expected to arrive on November 13, 1835.

Another one, "Naples gets frozen, and Neva won't melt" proved to be not that definitive. An Academia Publishers editor in 1939 found it a good reason to change the date to 1839, a year when the winter was particularly severe. Several years later critic M.F.Nikoleva pointed to the fact that the spring of 1835 was also exceptionally cold.

Another fact that confused literary historians was that Verses 2-4 and 137-139 of "Sashka" have found their way into another Lermontov poem, "In Memory of A.I.Odoyevsky", written in 1839. As the poet's vast legacy has been systematized in the 20th century, it was established that recycling lines in this manner was the common practice with Lermontov ("In Memory of A.I.Odoyevsky" also featured a fragment from 1832 poem "He was born for happiness, for hopes...").

== Legacy ==
Critics see Sashka as an important point in Lermontov's evolution from a purveyor of 'Byronic' romanticism to a social realist. According to the Lermontov Encyclopedia, the poem's most obvious predecessors were Byron's Don Juan and Beppo, but it was also continuing the Russian tradition of A Dangerous Neighbour by Vasily Pushkin, Sashka by Alexander Polezhayev and Alexander Pushkin's Yevgeny Onegin and The House in Kolomna. The author's major intention was to create a portrait of a young man of his generation, a "common fellow" (not an exceptional "hero") and he did this in a jovial manner, using simple language.

The subtitle, "The Moral Poem", anticipated, apparently, the criticism concerning the supposed "amorality" of sex scenes (Sashka and Tirza, Sashka's father and Mavrusha, a cook's daughter). According to the Lermontov Encyclopedia, "the cynicism of the poem's certain episodes was aimed at demonstrating the immorality of the relationship in the serfdom-based upon Russian society."
