= Giuseppe Maria Imbonati =

Italian nobleman and patron of writers

Count Giuseppe Maria Imbonati
- Born: 4 July 1688; Milan
- Died: 2 July 1768 (aged 79)
- Occupations: aristocrat, patron of writers
- Known for: founder, Accademia dei Trasformati
- Spouse: Francesca Bicetti dei Buttinoni (m.1712)
- Children: 6

Count Giuseppe Maria Imbonati (4 July 1688 – 2 July 1768) was an aristocrat and patron of writers in Milan. He was one of the founders of the scholarly Accademia dei Trasformati.

== Biography ==
Imbonati was born in Milan to a prominent aristocratic family. He married in 1745 at the age of 57 years. His wife, Francesca Bicetti dei Buttinoni, bore six children. She was active in a variety of scholarly societies in Northern Italy and Rome, and helped prod him to sponsor (starting in 1743) meetings at his Palazzo Imbonati at Piazza San Fedele of the Accademia dei Trasformati, which included Carl'Antonio Tanzi, Domenico Balestrieri, Giuseppe Parini, Abbot Passeroni, Giorgio Giulini, Pietro Verri, Cesare Beccaria, and Maria Gaetana Agnesi. Imbonati was named "perpetual conservator". The meetings were then moved to Villa Imbonati, now city hall, in Cavallasca.
