= Cicisbeo =

Male companion to a married noblewoman

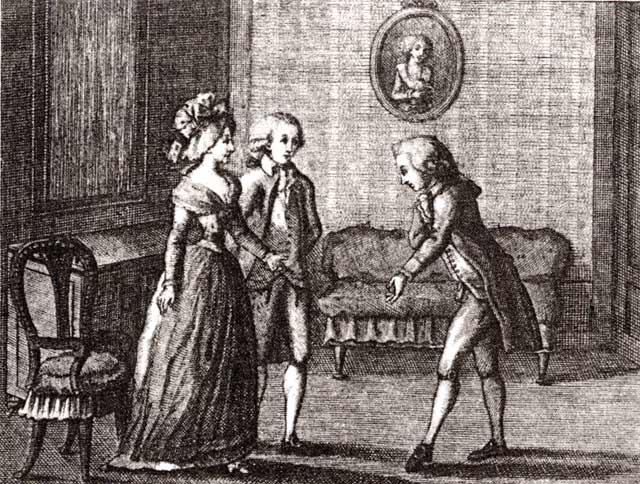
Luigi Ponelato, Il cicisbeo, etching, 1790

In 18th- and 19th-century Italy, the cicisbeo (UK: /ˌtʃɪtʃɪzˈbeɪoʊ/ CHITCH-iz-BAY-oh, US: /ˌtʃiːtʃ-/ CHEE-chiz-, Italian: [tʃitʃiˈzbɛːo]; plural: cicisbei) or cavalier servente (French: chevalier servant) was the man who was the professed gallant or lover of a woman married to someone else. With the knowledge and consent of the husband, the cicisbeo attended his mistress at public entertainments, to church and other occasions, and had privileged access to this woman. The arrangement is comparable to the Spanish cortejo or estrecho and was influenced by the French petit-maître.

== Etymology ==
The exact etymology of the word is unknown; some evidence suggests it originally meant "in a whisper" (perhaps an onomatopeic word). Other accounts suggest it is an inversion of bel cece, which means "beautiful chick (pea)". According to the Oxford English Dictionary, the first recorded usage of the term in English was found in a letter by Lady Mary Wortley Montagu dated 1718. The term appears in Italian in Giovanni Maria Muti's Quaresimale Del Padre Maestro Fra Giovanni Maria Muti De Predicatori of 1708 (p. 734).

== Social importance ==
This arrangement, called the cicisbeatura or cicisbeismo, was widely practised, especially among the nobility of the Italian cities of Genoa, Nice, Venice, Florence and Rome. While many contemporary references to cicisbei and descriptions of their social standing exist, scholars diverge on the exact nature of the phenomenon. Some maintain that this institution was defined by marriage contracts, others question this claim and see it as a peculiarity of 18th-century customs that is not well defined or easily explained. Other scholars see it as a sign of the increasing emancipation of aristocratic women in the 18th century.

The cicisbeo was better tolerated if he was known to be homosexual. Louise d'Épinay wrote from Paris to her friend Ferdinando Galiani about the impending departure of marchese Alvise Mocenigo, the Venetian ambassador, whose tastes the ambassador had displayed in Paris:

Nothing equals the friendly companionship afforded to a woman by men of those persuasions. To the rest of you, so full of yourselves, one can't say a word that you don't take as provocation. ... Whereas with those gentlemen one knows quite well that they want no more of us than we of them—one feels in no danger and deliciously free"

Regardless of its roots and technicalities, the custom was firmly entrenched. Typically, husbands tolerated or even welcomed the arrangement: Lord Byron, for example, was cicisbeo to Teresa, Contessa Guiccioli. After Byron's death, the Contessa's second husband, the Marquis de Boissy, was known to brag about the fact, introducing her as "Madame la Marquise de Boissy, autrefois la Maitresse de Milord Byron" (the Marquise de Boissy, formerly the mistress of Lord Byron). Byron also famously analyzed the institution from an English point of view in his poem Beppo. Attempts by the husband to ward off prospective cicisbei or disapproval of the practice in general was likely to be met with ridicule and scorn:

... for, you must understand, this Italian fashion prevails at Nice among all ranks of people; and there is not such a passion as jealousy known. The husband and the cicisbeo live together as sworn brothers; and the wife and the mistress embrace each other with marks of the warmest affection.
[E]very married lady in this country has her cicisbeo, or servente, who attends her every where on all occasions, and upon whose privileges the husband dares not encroach, without incurring the censure and ridicule of the whole community.

Cicisbei played by set rules, generally avoiding public displays of affection. At public entertainments, they would typically stand behind their seated mistress and whisper in her ear. Customs of the time did not permit them to engage in relationships with any other women during their free time, making the arrangement rather demanding. Either party could decide to end the relationship at any time. A woman's former cicisbei were called spiantati (literally penniless, destroyed), or cast-offs.

== In the arts ==
The topic can be found in the contemporary poem Il Giorno (1763) by Giuseppe Parini. Other works from the period which make use of the topic include:

- Così fan tutte Act II scene 1 (1790), an opera by Wolfgang Amadeus Mozart
- The Antiquarian's Family (1749), a comedy by Carlo Goldoni
- L'italiana in Algeri (1813) and Il turco in Italia (1788), operas by Gioachino Rossini
- La Tosca (1887), play by Victorien Sardou, the basis of the opera Tosca by Giacomo Puccini
- Beppo (1817), a poem by Lord Byron.
- Don Juan (1819), in Canto III by Lord Byron. In stanza 24, Byron refers to a single man returning from a voyage and becomes a cavalier servente to a former love.
- The Valley of Decision, a 1902 novel by Edith Wharton, contains several references to cicisbei.

== See also ==
- Chaperone
- Courtesan
- Courtly love
- Cuckoldry
- Gigolo
- Mistress
- Polyandry
