= Marius Nizolius =

Italian humanist (1498–1576)

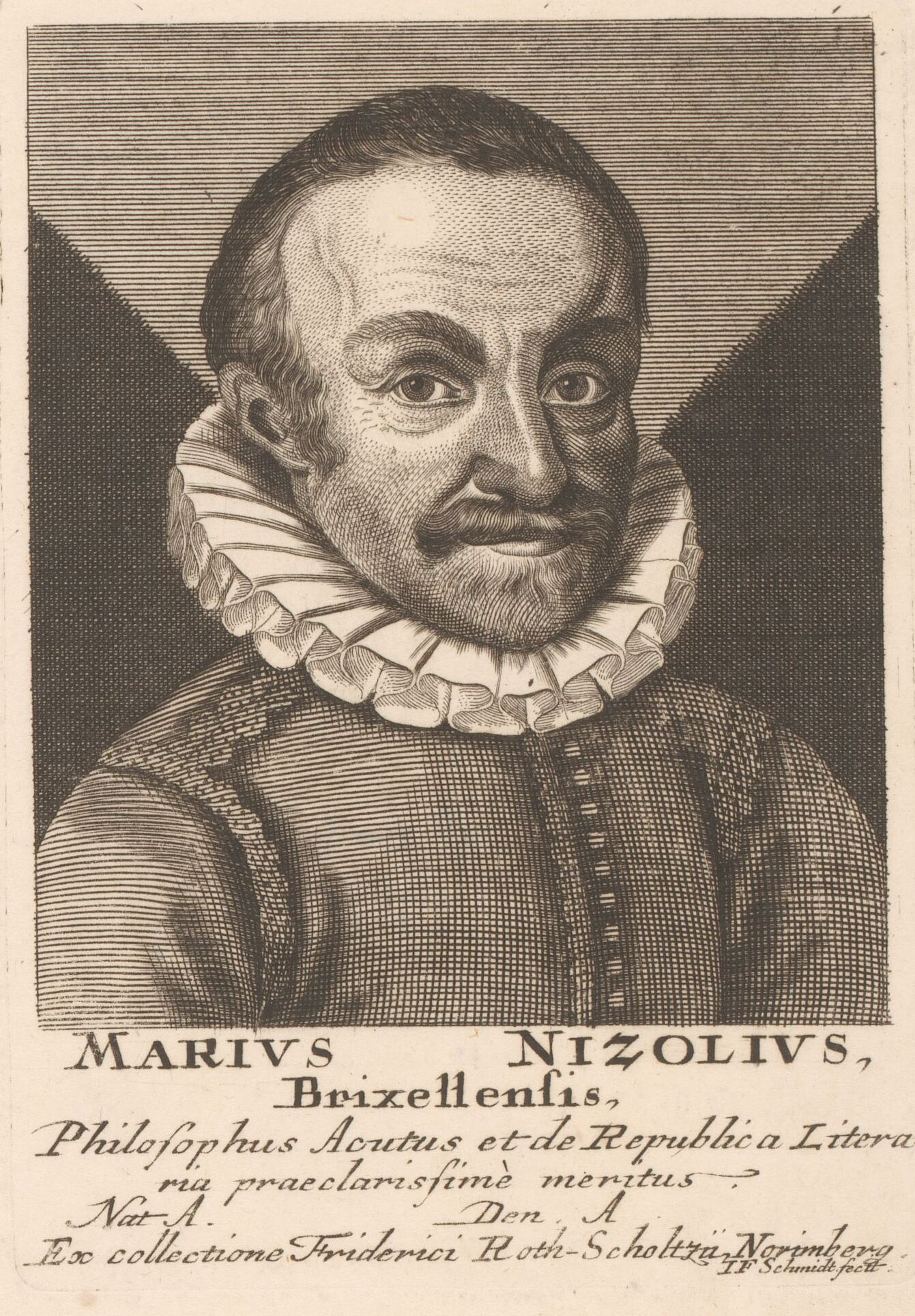
Engraved portrait of Mario Nizolio by Johann Friedrich Schmidt

Marius Nizolius (Italian: Mario Nizolio; 1498–1576) was an Italian humanist scholar, known as a proponent of Cicero. He considered rhetoric to be the central intellectual discipline, slighting other aspects of the philosophical tradition. He is described by Michael R. Allen as the heir to the oratorical vision of Lorenzo Valla, and a better nominalist.

== Life and works ==
He was born in Brescello. He was professor of philosophy at Parma and Sabbioneta. He died in Sabbioneta. His major work was the Thesaurus Ciceronianus, first published in 1535 in Brixen but not under this title, and running into many further editions. It was a lexicon of Latin words used in Cicero's works. It was adopted by Renaissance extremists who considered that writing in Latin could only be correct within this restricted vocabulary. His Antibarbarus philosophicus (original title De veris principiis et vera ratione philosophandi contra psudophilosophos, Parma, 1553) was edited by Leibniz in 1670 with an important Preface. It was a reply in a controversy with Marcantonius Majoragio (1514–1555), and going back to a dispute from the mid-1540s over the Paradoxes of Cicero.
