= Domenico Balestrieri (writer) =

Italian scholar, writer and poet

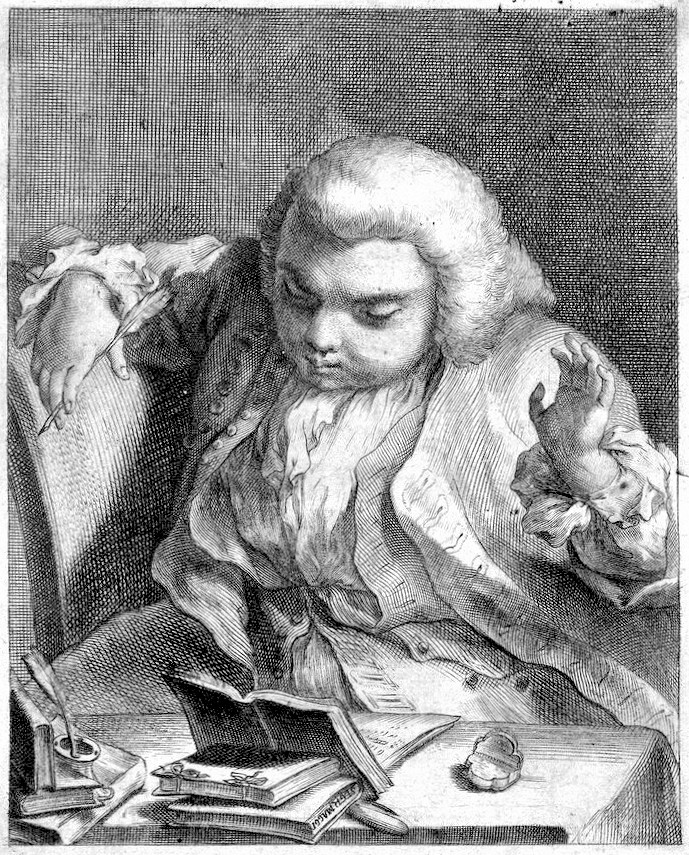
- Domenico Balestrieri
- Born: 16 April 1714; Milan, Duchy of Milan
- Died: 11 May 1780; Milan, Duchy of Milan
- Resting place: San Nazaro in Brolo
- Occupation: Poet
- Movement: Enlightenment
- Spouse: Rosalia Casati (m. 1747)

Domenico Balestrieri (1714–1780) was an Italian scholar, writer and poet. He gained his fame as an author of "dialectal" works in Milanese language, for which he is considered one of the classics of Milanese literature. Baestrieri's work was a major inspiration source for later Milanese writers such as Carlo Porta.

== Biography ==
Domenico Balestrieri was born in Milan on April 16, 1714. On 10 October 1747 he married Rosalia Casati. He died on June 11, 1780. Balestrieri was an important figure of Enlightenment Milan and a founding member of the Accademia dei Trasformati. He was a close friend of Carlo Imbonati and Giuseppe Parini, who commemorated his death in a sonnet entitled In morte di Domenico Balestrieri.

Balestrieri wrote poems both in Milanese dialect and Italian. His main works are the Rimm milanes de Meneghin Balestreri Accademech Trasformae (1744) and Rime toscane e milanesi (1774–9). He also translated Torquato Tasso's Jerusalem Delivered into Milanese (Milan, 1773). There were two characteristics of the translation: it was a parody of the original work, yet it also treated the poem seriously, particularly on themes of religion or pastoral love. Balestrieri's poetry collection Lagrime in morte di un gatto (1741), included contributions from Giuseppe Marc'Antonio Baretti and the brothers Carlo and Gasparo Gozzi.

== Works ==
- Lagrime in morte di un gatto. Milano: nella stamperia di Giuseppe Marelli. 1741.
- Per el tanto sospirado parto masculin de so' maestae la regina nostra parona Soneti dedicadi a so' eminenza el sior gardenal Stampa arcivescovo de Milan. Milano: In la stamperia de Polo Montan. 1741.
- In morte di sua eccellenza il signor conte Giovanni Benedetto Borromeo Arese rime a sua eccellenza la signora contessa donna Clelia Grillo Borromeo. In Milano: per Francesco Agnelli. 1744.
- Rimm milanes de Meneghin Balestreri Accademech trasformae. In Milan: in la stampa de Donae Ghisolf. 1744.
- Il Figliuol prodigo. In Milano: per Giuseppe Marelli. 1748.
- Ai sò nevodinn Marina e Cecca Balestreri, che se faan monegh in del monester de Sant Antonj de Padova, el Barba Meneghin (PDF). Milano: Giuseppe Marelli. 1754.
- El cangeler della Badia di Meneghitt all'autor del segond dialegh della lengua toscana. Milan: in la stampa di Antoni Agnell. 1760.
- La Badia di Menegihtt, a consulta sora el dialegh della lengua toscana Rezzitae el 27. d'Agost del 1759. Da zert student de rettorega, e stampae el di 8. de Settember dell'istess ann. Milan: in stampa di Antoni Agnell. 1760.
- La camaretta di Meneghitt in conversazion sora do letter vuna del Scolaer al scior abbae Isepp Parin; l'oltra del Majster al scior Carl'Antonj Tanz. In Milan: in la Stampa de Antonj Agnell. 1760.
- Spassatemp del Tizziroeu, e del Mennapaes capp della Badia dj Menegihtt sora la resposta con l'annotazion, e la P.S. al scior abbae Parin dell'autor di duu Dialegh della lengua toscana. Milan: in la stampa de Antonj Agnell. 1760.
- Ottav milanes recitaa a Mombell da Meneghin Balestreri in occasion che 'l Magnifech Scior Cont Senator, e Proconsultor Don Steven Gaitan Crivell l'e staa destinaa dalla Cort de Vienna Governator dell'Ill.em Magistraa Cameral del Stat de Milan. Milan: in la Stampa de Antoni Agnell. 1762.
- La Gerusalemme liberata travestita in lingua milanese a sua Eccellenza Carlo conte, e signore De Firmian. In Milano: appresso Gio. Batista Bianchi regio stampatore, 1772 in folio; in 8: vol. 1, 2, 3, 4
- Rime toscane, e milanesi, 6 voll. In Milano: appresso Giambattista Bianchi regio stampatore, 1774-1779 voll. 1-3; voll. 4-6

== Sources ==
- Isella, Dante (1963). "BALESTRIERI, Domenico". Dizionario Biografico degli Italiani (in Italian). Vol. 5: Bacca–Baratta. Rome: Institute of the Italian Encyclopaedia. OCLC 883370.
- Mari, Michele (1982). "La "Gerusalemme liberata" milanese di Domenico Balestrieri" [The Milanese Jerusalem Delivered of Domenico Balestrieri]. Acme. 35 (2–3): 445–496.
- Haller, Hermann W. (1999). The Other Italy: The Literary Canon in Dialect. University of Toronto Press. ISBN 0802044247.
