= Il Giorno =

Il Giorno may refer to:

- Il Giorno (newspaper), an Italian newspaper
- Il giorno (poem) (1763), a poem written by Giuseppe Parini
