= List of Milanese dialect writers =

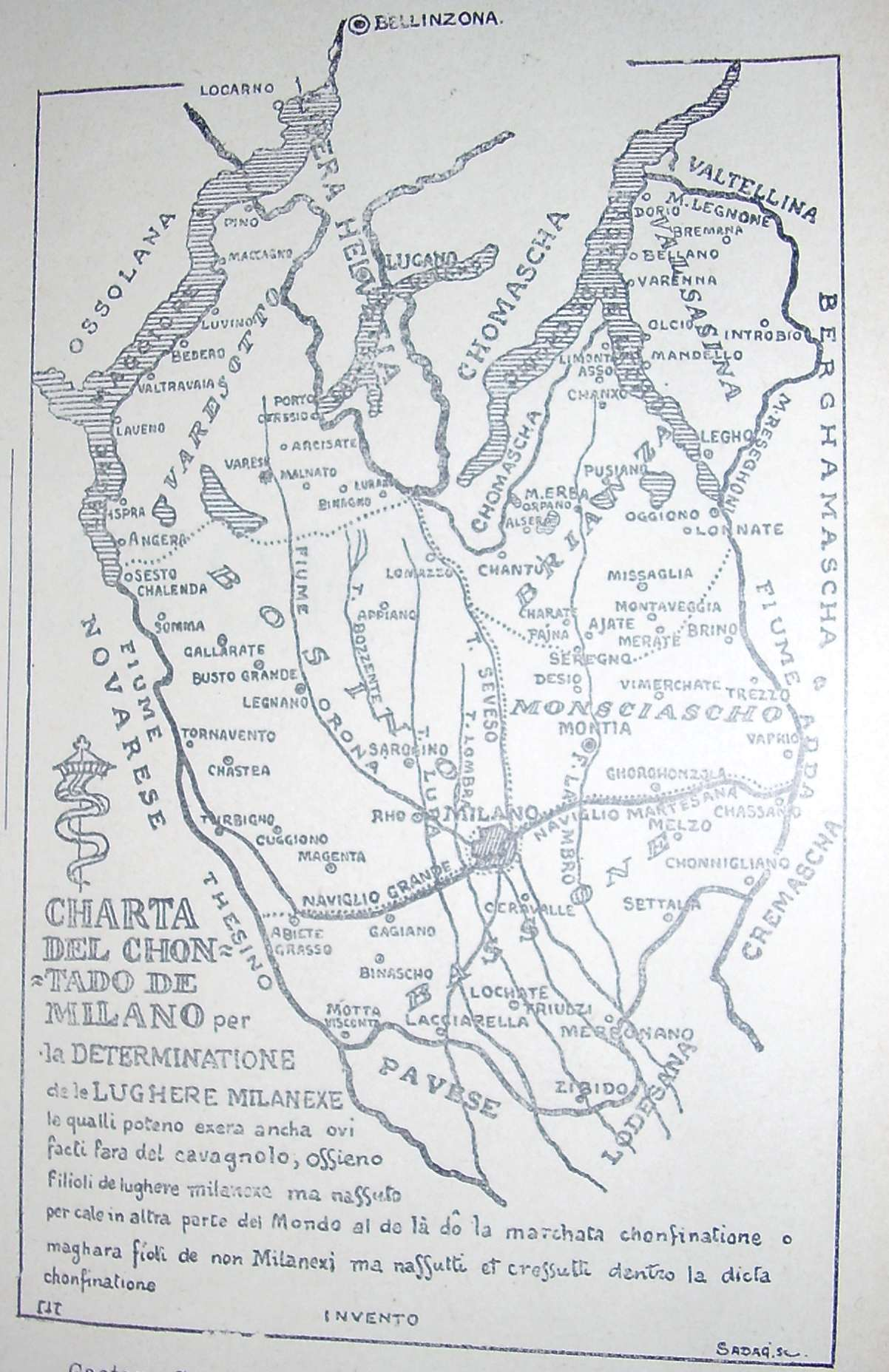
The linguistic and cultural area of Milan.

The following writers, poets, and playwrights wrote in the Milanese dialect.

- Bonvesin da la Riva
- Fabio Varese
- Carlo Maria Maggi
- Carlo Antonio Tanzi
- Domenico Balestrieri
- Giuseppe Parini
- Carlo Porta
- Tommaso Grossi
- Giovanni Rajberti
- Carlo Bertolazzi
- Delio Tessa
