= Carlo Imbonati =

Italian nobleman and highbrow

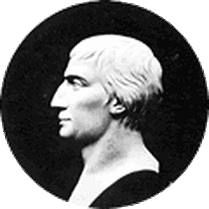
Cameo depicting Carlo Imbonati (1753-1805)

Carlo Imbonati (Milan, 1753 – Paris, 15 March 1805) was an Italian nobleman and highbrow. He is known above all for the several poems which were dedicated to him by the famous literates Giuseppe Parini and, particularly, Alessandro Manzoni. Born in a prestigious and wealthy family from the Milanese nobility, from 1763 he was instructed by Parini, who dedicated to him the ode L'Educazione in occasion of his eleventh birthday. In 1792 Imbonati began a relationship with Giulia Beccaria, mother of the young Alessandro Manzoni. After his death, the poet would write for him the juvenile work In morte di Carlo Imbonati, which would be published in 1806.
