= Paradoxa Stoicorum =

Treatise on Stoic philosophy by Cicero

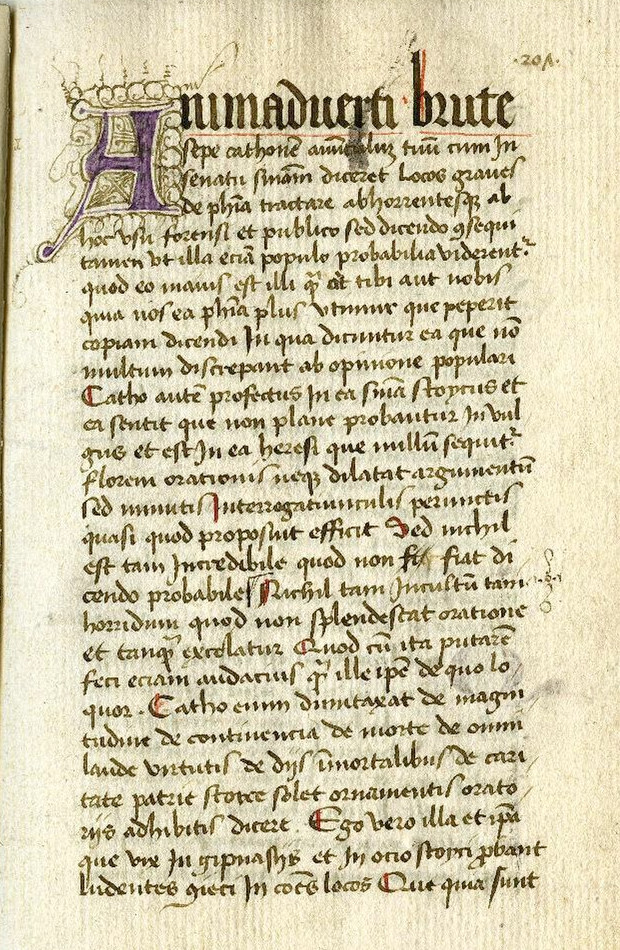
- 15th century manuscript, Leiden University
- Author: Cicero
- Language: Classical Latin
- Subject: Stoicism
- Genre: Philosophy
- Publication date: 46 BCE
- Publication place: Roman Republic

The Paradoxa Stoicorum (English: Stoic Paradoxes) is a work by the academic skeptic philosopher Cicero in which he attempts to explain six famous Stoic sayings that appear to go against common understanding: (1) virtue is the sole good; (2) virtue is the sole requisite for happiness; (3) all good deeds are equally virtuous and all bad deeds equally vicious; (4) all fools are mad; (5) only the wise are free, whereas all fools are enslaved; and (6) only the wise are rich.

== History ==
The work was written sometime around 46 BC. The work is dedicated to Marcus Brutus. In the introduction, Cicero praises Brutus' uncle Cato the Younger.

Cicero was motivated to write the work in order to re-express Stoic arguments within the language of rhetorical Latin. Cicero states his intention is to make a version of an original Greek work in a language appropriate for the mode of the Forum. He defends the paradoxes with popular arguments, sometimes hardly more than a play upon words, and illustrates them with anecdotes from history. It is thought that he did not regard these essays as serious works of philosophy, but rather as rhetorical exercises. Elsewhere Cicero criticizes these paradoxes: especially De Finibus iv. 74–77 and Pro Murena 60–66.

The earliest manuscript dates are from the 9th century. The Paradoxa Stoicorum is notable for being one of the first printed books. In 1465 Johann Fust and Peter Schöffer printed the work together with Cicero's de Officiis having taken control of the Gutenberg press at Mainz.

In the 16th century, Marcantonius Majoragio wrote a work criticising Cicero, entitled the Antiparadoxon. Majoragio believed that Cicero's work was un-Socratic, and furthermore that the arguments were unskilful and false.

== Contents ==
The subject of the work is to examine a principle of Stoic thought: the paradoxes. The work is concerned specifically with six of these:

=== I: Virtue is the only good ===
In this book Cicero presents the Stoic classifications of what elements of life are genuinely good, and what elements are not good. There are three different qualities of something being genuinely good: righteousness (rectum), intrinsic honor or nobility (honestum), and intrinsic virtue (cum virtute). This can be understood as the inner person, and the choices and actions that they engage in.

Pleasure and wealth cannot be genuine goods because they lack the crucial properties that a genuine good should have. Genuine goods should satisfy desire and make their possessor happy. Spurious or apparent goods do not satisfy desires, but rather, arouse yet more desire, as well as fear that one might lose these things that they presently possess. Cicero also argues that something cannot be a good if an evil person can possess it. Thus wealth and pleasure cannot be a genuine good.

Humans alone among all animals possess reason, and this alone allows humans to pursue the good. The good therefore should be defined exclusively in rational terms and thus the moral life should be ordered according to reason.

=== II: Virtue is sufficient for happiness ===
Virtue is all that is needed for happiness. Happiness depends on a possession which cannot be lost, and this only applies to things within our control.

=== III: All the vices and all virtues are equal ===
All good deeds are equally meritorious and all bad deeds equally heinous. All virtues are equal as this corresponds to the same impulse towards the good. Cicero does not attempt to defend the Stoic position of the moral equality of all offenses; instead he offers a weakened version that offenses of the same sort are equal. He notes the Stoic position that all crimes are equal since they all involve the same intent to break the law, but he then argues that crimes do not bear the same penalty since the matter depends on the status of the person injured and that of the criminal. Thus he ends up imposing gradations of vice based on external factors.

=== IV: All fools are mad ===
There is a substantial lacuna at the beginning of this section. The remaining part argues that every fool is an exile and the wise person cannot be harmed. Cicero attacks an unnamed personal enemy for causing his exile. The essay is thought to be a thinly veiled attack on Cicero's enemy Clodius. Cicero asserts that his own exile was not a hardship since he possessed the correct Stoic wisdom and virtue.

=== V: The sage alone is free ===
Only the sage is free and every fool is a slave. Cicero attacks an unnamed military leader who is unworthy of command because he cannot control his passions and thus is not free. The target here may be Lucullus. Cicero satirizes costly luxury and affectation of connoisseurship in collecting works of art. Freedom involves the rational control of one's will. Only the sage is free since he freely chooses the good.

=== VI: Only the wise person is rich ===
If a rich person's wealth is measured by the quantity of their goods, then a wealthy person with no virtue is poor, since virtue is the only good. People confuse reasonable needs with unreasonable desires and this leads people in power to pursue irrational passions.

== Editions ==
- Paradoxa stoicorum ad M. Brutum (Latin) (ed. J. G. Baiter, C. L. Kayser)
- "The booke of Marcus Tullius Cicero entituled Paradoxa Stoicorum. Contayninge a precise discourse of diuers poinctes and conclusions of vertue and phylosophie according the traditions and opinions of those philosophers, whiche were called Stoikes. Wherunto is also annexed a philosophicall treatyse of the same authoure called Scipio hys dreame. Anno. 1569". Published in the year 1569, translated by Thomas Newton.
