= Giulia Beccaria =

Italian noblewoman, mother of Alessandro Manzoni

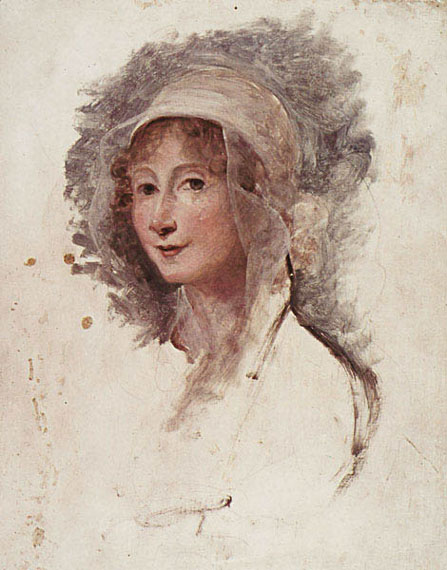
- Maria Cosway, Ritratto di Giulia Beccaria Manzoni (1802)
- Born: Giulia Maria Anna Margarita Beccaria; 21 July 1762; Milan, Duchy of Milan
- Died: 7 July 1841 (aged 78); Milan, Kingdom of Lombardy–Venetia, Austrian Empire
- Occupation: Noblewoman
- Children: Alessandro Manzoni
- Father: Cesare Beccaria

Giulia Maria Anna Margarita Beccaria Manzoni (née Beccaria; 21 July 1762 – 7 July 1841) was an Italian noblewoman, the daughter of criminologist Cesare Beccaria. She was the wife of Pietro Manzoni and the mother of writer Alessandro Manzoni.

== Biography ==
=== Youth and relationship with Giovanni Verri ===
Daughter of Marquis Cesare Beccaria and Teresa de Blasco – a noblewoman of Spanish origin – Giulia, after a childhood spent in her father’s home, was educated from 1774 at the boarding school attached to the San Paolo convent, from which she left in 1780, after turning eighteen. The young woman’s adolescence was marked not only by the austere atmosphere of the convent, which suited her little, but also by her father’s indifference who, after the early death of his wife Teresa, had remarried the noblewoman Anna Barbò. Returning to her father’s home, Giulia found herself immersed in the environment of Milanese Enlightenment (whose ideas engaged her), while also developing cultural interests. Among family friends, Pietro Verri particularly influenced her, but she was in contact with much of Milan's cultural elite, from university professors to Enlightenment thinkers. After leaving the convent in 1780, she fell in love, reciprocated, with Giovanni Verri, the younger brother of Pietro and Alessandro Verri, from whose relationship, in all likelihood, her son Alessandro was born.

=== Marriage to Pietro Manzoni ===
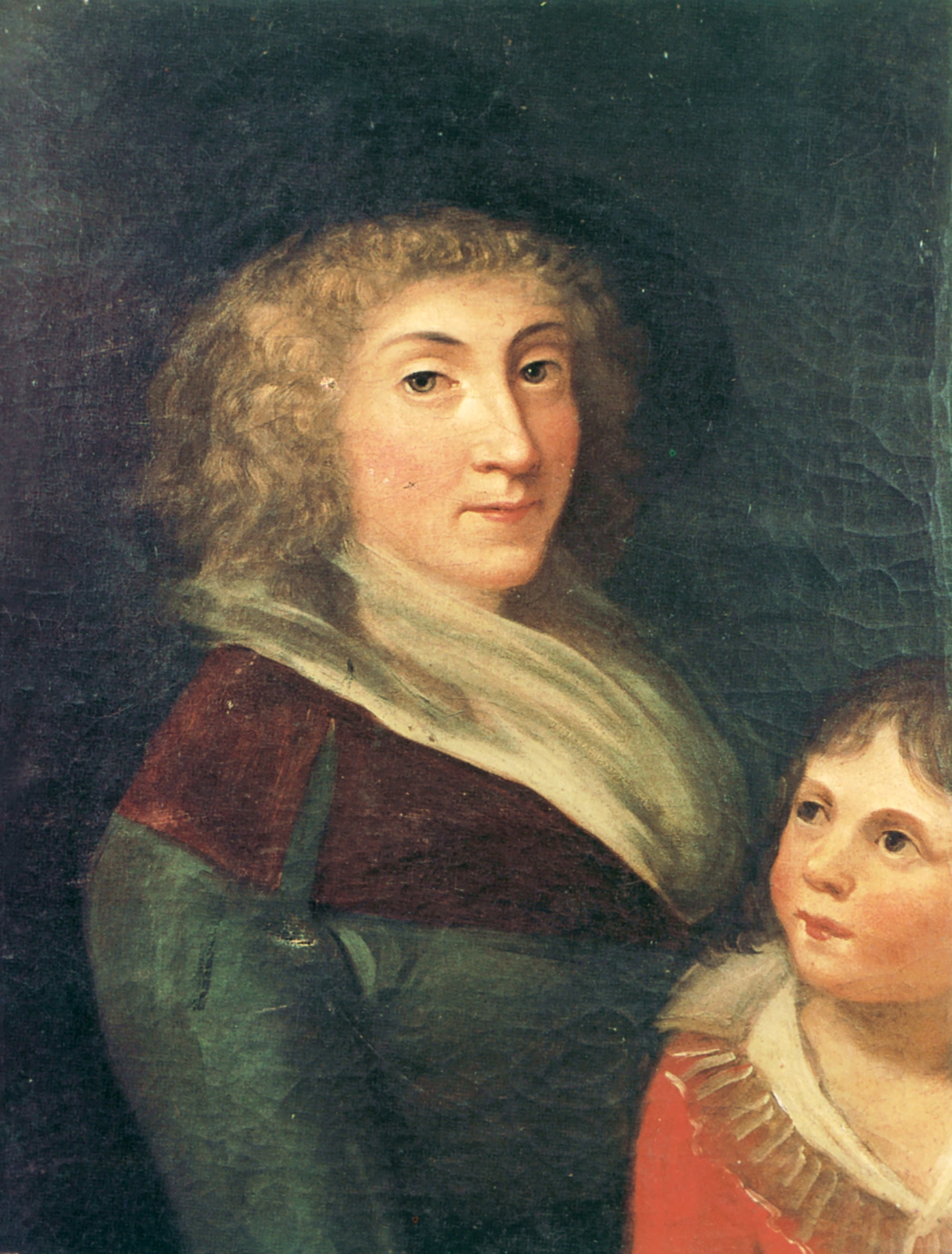
Andrea Appiani, Ritratto di Giulia Beccaria e suo figlio Alessandro Manzoni bambino, 1790

On 20 October 1782, the twenty-year-old Giulia, due to her family’s financial difficulties and the lack of approval from Pietro and Alessandro Verri for her marriage to their younger brother Giovanni, had to marry Pietro Manzoni, a wealthy Lecce gentleman twenty-six years her senior. The marriage was celebrated in Cesare Beccaria’s domestic oratory and was undoubtedly advantageous from an economic standpoint (she brought a dowry of five thousand scudi, while he guaranteed an annual income of thirty thousand lire) but unhappy on a personal and emotional level. Evidence of this emotional state comes from the intervention of Niccolò Tommaseo: “Even of Pietro Verri [Manzoni] speaks with reverence, all the more so because he knows, and his mother did not hide it from him, that he was his nephew, that is, the son of one of his brothers.” Despite the differences in character and age, from the marriage with Pietro Manzoni, officially, their only son Alessandro was born in Milan on 7 March 1785, first entrusted to a wet nurse at the Cascina Costa in Galbiate, near Lecco, and then to the colleges of the Somaschi Fathers in Merate and Lugano.

=== Relationship with Carlo Imbonati ===
On 23 February 1792, Giulia separated from Pietro Manzoni, to whom their son, toward whom she had always shown little interest, was entrusted. It seems she stayed for a period with her maternal uncle Michele Blasco, but meanwhile, her relationship with Carlo Imbonati, a cultured and very wealthy nobleman, had been ongoing for two years. From 1795, she lived with him until his death, first briefly in London, then in Paris at Place de Vendôme. Both immersed in the Parisian cultural elite, they often visited Auteuil, a commune near Paris, now incorporated between the capital and Boulogne-Billancourt, where the widow of the philosopher Claude-Adrien Helvétius, Anne-Catherine de Ligneville, lived. Thanks to Imbonati, Giulia was able to associate with the idéologues, a group of intellectuals, heirs of late Enlightenment thought, interested in the study of society and its issues, becoming friends with Sophie de Condorcet and Claude Fauriel, with whom her son Alessandro would later form connections.

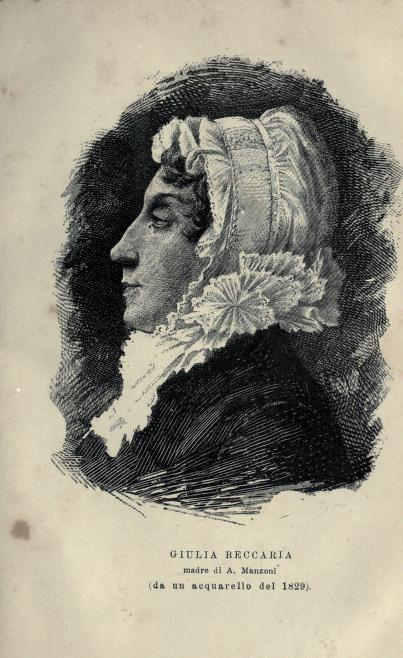
Profile portrait of Giulia Beccaria in 1829, from the Reminiscenze di Cesare Cantù.

=== From Paris to Milan ===
==== The marriage of Alessandro and Enrichetta Blondel ====
In 1805, Carlo Imbonati died, leaving her his entire estate, and Giulia convinced her son to live with her. From that moment, mother and son became very close, so much so that in a letter, Manzoni refers to his mother as my Giulia. Eager to see her son happy and to build a solid family unit, Giulia initially took an interest in Luigina Visconti, then inquired about Mademoiselle Augustine Emilie Victoire, daughter of the French philosopher Antoine-Louis-Claude Destutt de Tracy. The first was dismissed because she was already engaged, and the second because she was not noble enough; Giulia then set her sights on Enrichetta Blondel, the daughter of a wealthy Geneva family involved in the silk trade. The two young people married in Milan on 8 February 1808.

==== The "family engine": between Milan and Brusuglio ====
With her son, she rediscovered the Catholic Church. When he returned permanently to Milan in 1810, Giulia followed him and lived with him and his large family, alternating between the Milanese palace and the villa in Brusuglio inherited from Imbonati. The following years saw Giulia become the cornerstone of the family, a solid rock on which Alessandro and Enrichetta’s large family was built.

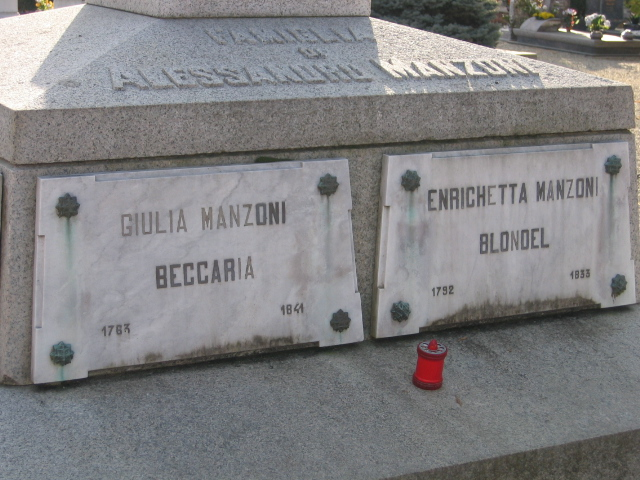
The tombs of Giulia Beccaria and Enrichetta Blondel in the cemetery of Brusuglio.

Following her conversion, Giulia’s interests also changed: from the worldly life alongside Sophie de Condorcet and the Enlightenment thinkers, her daily routine now revolved around numerous acts of piety and spiritual mortifications prescribed by the Manzoni family’s spiritual director, Luigi Tosi, from whom she received her first Eucharist alongside her daughter-in-law and son on 15 August 1810. The 1810s and 1820s saw Giulia take on the role of grandmother to her numerous grandchildren, as well as that of her son’s literary advisor, promoting his image and supporting his artistic endeavors. However, the family idyll was disrupted by the death of Enrichetta on 25 December 1833 (an event that inspired Manzoni to compose the ode, left unfinished, Il Natale del 1833). The 1830s also saw the death of Manzoni’s eldest daughter, Giulietta, married to Massimo d’Azeglio. The now-elderly Giulia, in her final years, clashed with Manzoni’s second wife, Teresa Borri, who, unlike Enrichetta, was very resistant to granting her elderly mother-in-law the role of “family engine” she had held until then. Tired and ill (she began suffering from nervous disorders), Beccaria died on 7 July 1841, shortly after the death of another granddaughter, Sofia. Beccaria’s remains rest, alongside those of Enrichetta and some of her grandchildren, in the cemetery of Brusuglio, a frazione of Cormano (Milan).

== Bibliography ==
- Sforza, Giovanni; Gallavresi, Giuseppe (1912). Carteggio di Alessandro Manzoni. 1803-1821 [Correspondence of Alessandro Manzoni. 1803-1821] (in Italian). Milan: Hoepli.
- "BECCARIA, Giulia". Dizionario biografico degli italiani [Biographical Dictionary of Italians] (in Italian). Vol. 7. 1970.
- Boneschi, Marta (2012). Quel che il cuore sapeva: Giulia Beccaria, i Verri e i Manzoni [What the Heart Knew: Giulia Beccaria, the Verri, and the Manzoni] (in Italian). Milan: Ledizioni. ISBN 88-04-54779-0.
- Bognetti, Gian Piero (1977). Manzoni giovane [Young Manzoni] (in Italian). Naples: Guida Editori.
- Ginzburg, Natalia (1989). La famiglia Manzoni [The Manzoni Family] (in Italian). Turin: Einaudi. ISBN 88-06-11568-5.
- Petrocchi, Giorgio (1968). "Enrichetta Blondel". Dizionario biografico degli italiani [Biographical Dictionary of Italians] (in Italian). Vol. 10.
- Tellini, Gino (2007). Manzoni (in Italian). Rome: Salerno Editrice. ISBN 978-88-8402-572-2.
- Titta Rosa, Giovanni (1954). Colloqui col Manzoni di N. Tommaseo, G. Borri, R. Bonghi, seguiti da "Memorie manzoniane" di C. Fabris [Conversations with Manzoni by N. Tommaseo, G. Borri, R. Bonghi, followed by "Manzonian Memories" by C. Fabris] (in Italian). Milan: Ceschina.
- Tonelli, Luigi (1963). Manzoni (in Italian). Milan: Dall’Oglio.
