= Don Juan (poem) =

Satiric poem by Lord Byron

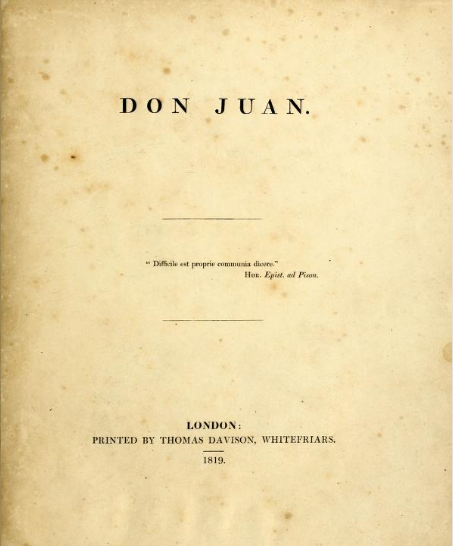
- Don Juan (1819) First Ed.
- Author: Lord Byron
- Language: English
- Genre: Epic poem and satire
- Publication date: 1819–1824 (final cantos published posthumously)
- Publication place: United Kingdom
- Pages: 555 pages
- Preceded by: Childe Harold's Pilgrimage
- Followed by: Mazeppa

Don Juan is an English unfinished satirical epic poem written by Lord Byron between 1819 and 1824 that portrays the Spanish folk legend of Don Juan, not as a womaniser as historically portrayed, but as a victim easily seduced by women. Don Juan is a poem written in ottava rima and presented in 16 cantos in which Lord Byron derived the character of Don Juan from traditional Spanish folk legends; however, the story was very much his own. Upon publication in 1819, cantos I and II were widely criticised as immoral because Byron had so freely ridiculed the social subjects and public figures of his time. At his death in 1824, Lord Byron had completed 16 of 17 cantos, whilst canto XVII remained unfinished.

== Composition ==
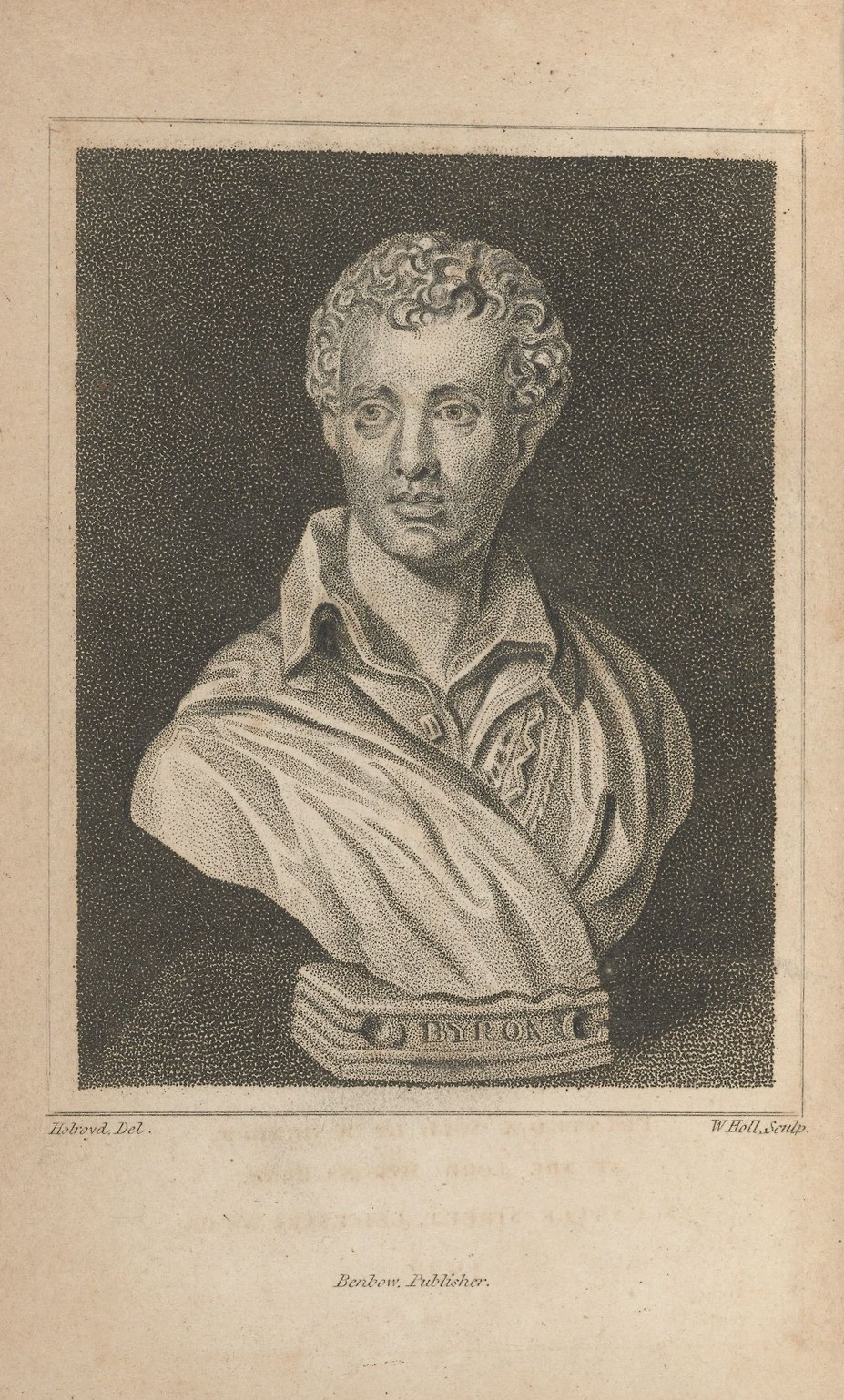
Frontispiece illustration of a bust of Lord Byron in the 1824 edition of Don Juan. (Benbow publisher)

Byron was a prolific writer, for whom "the composition of his great poem, Don Juan, was coextensive with a major part of his poetical life"; he wrote the first canto while resident in Italy in 1818, and the 17th canto in early 1823. Canto I was written between July and September 1818, and Canto II was written from December 1818 to January 1819. Cantos III and IV were written in the winter of 1819–1820 and canto V was written in October–November 1820. Cantos I and II were published on 15 July 1819, and cantos III, IV, and V were published on 8 August 1821.

Byron began to write canto VI in June 1822, and had completed writing canto XVI in March 1823. Given the moralistic notoriety of the satirical, epic poem, John Murray refused to publish the latter cantos of Don Juan, which then were entrusted to John Hunt, who published the cantos over a period of months; cantos VI, VII, and VIII, with a Preface, were published on 15 July 1823; cantos IX, X, and XI were published on 29 August 1823; cantos XII, XIII, and XIV were published on 17 December 1823; and cantos XV and XVI on 26 March 1824.

== Structure ==
The poetical narrative of Don Juan (1819–24) is told in 16,000 lines, arranged in 17 cantos, written in ottava rima (eighth rhyme); each stanza is composed of eight iambic pentameters, with the couplet rhyme scheme of AB AB AB CC. The ottava rima uses the final rhyming couplet as a line of humour, to achieve a rhetorical anticlimax by way of an abrupt transition, from a lofty style of writing to a vulgar style of writing.

In the example passage from Don Juan, canto I, stanza 1, lines 3–6, the Spanish name Juan is rhymed with the English sound for the words true one. Therefore Juan is spoken in English, as /ˈdʒuːən/ JOO-ən, which is the recurring pattern of enunciation used for pronouncing foreign names and words in the orthography of English.

Till, after cloying the gazettes with cant,
The age discovers he is not the true one;
Of such as these I should not care to vaunt,
I'll therefore take our ancient friend Don Juan—

— Don Juan, canto I, stanza 1, lines 3–6.

== Premise ==
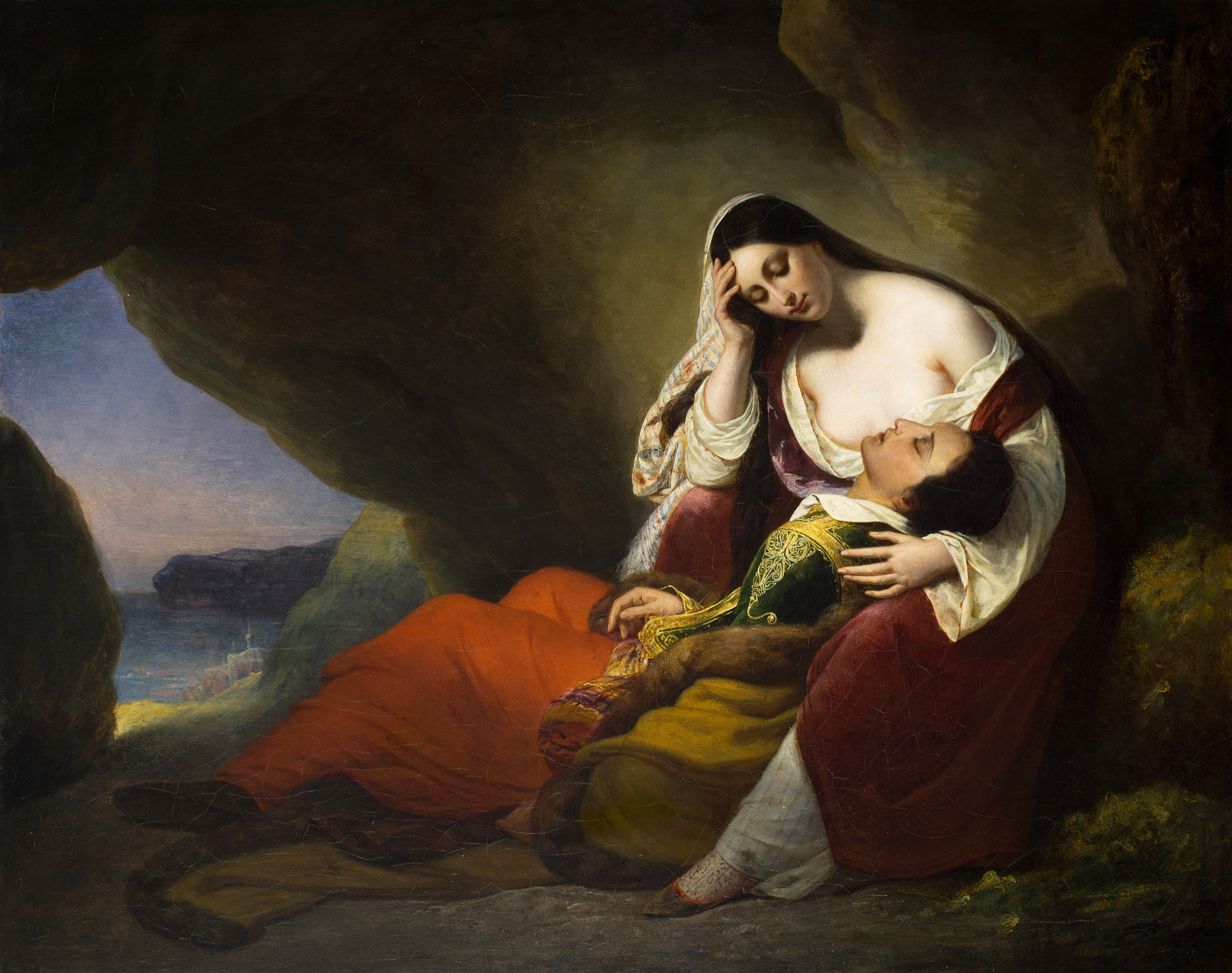
Hendrik Scheffer, Don Juan asleep on Haidée's lap, c. 1827

Don Juan begins with the birth of the hero, Don Juan, in Seville, Spain. As a sexually precocious adolescent boy, Juan has a love affair with a married friend of his mother. When the woman's husband discovers her affair with the boy, Don Juan is sent to the distant city of Cádiz. On the way, he is shipwrecked on an island in the Aegean Sea, and there meets the daughter of the pirate whose men later sell Don Juan into Turkish slavery. At the slave market of Constantinople, the sultana sees Don Juan up for sale, and orders him bought and then disguised as a girl, in order to sneak him into her chambers. Consequent to arousing the jealousy of the sultana, Don Juan barely escapes alive from the harem.

He then soldiers in the Imperial Russian army, rescues a Muslim girl, and attracts the favour of Empress Catherine the Great, who adds him to the royal court. In the course of Russian life, Don Juan falls ill because of the climate, and Catherine returns him to England, as a Russian courtier. In London, the diplomat Don Juan finds a guardian for the Muslim girl. The narrative then relates Don Juan's ensuing adventures with the British aristocracy.

== Synopsis ==
=== Canto I ===
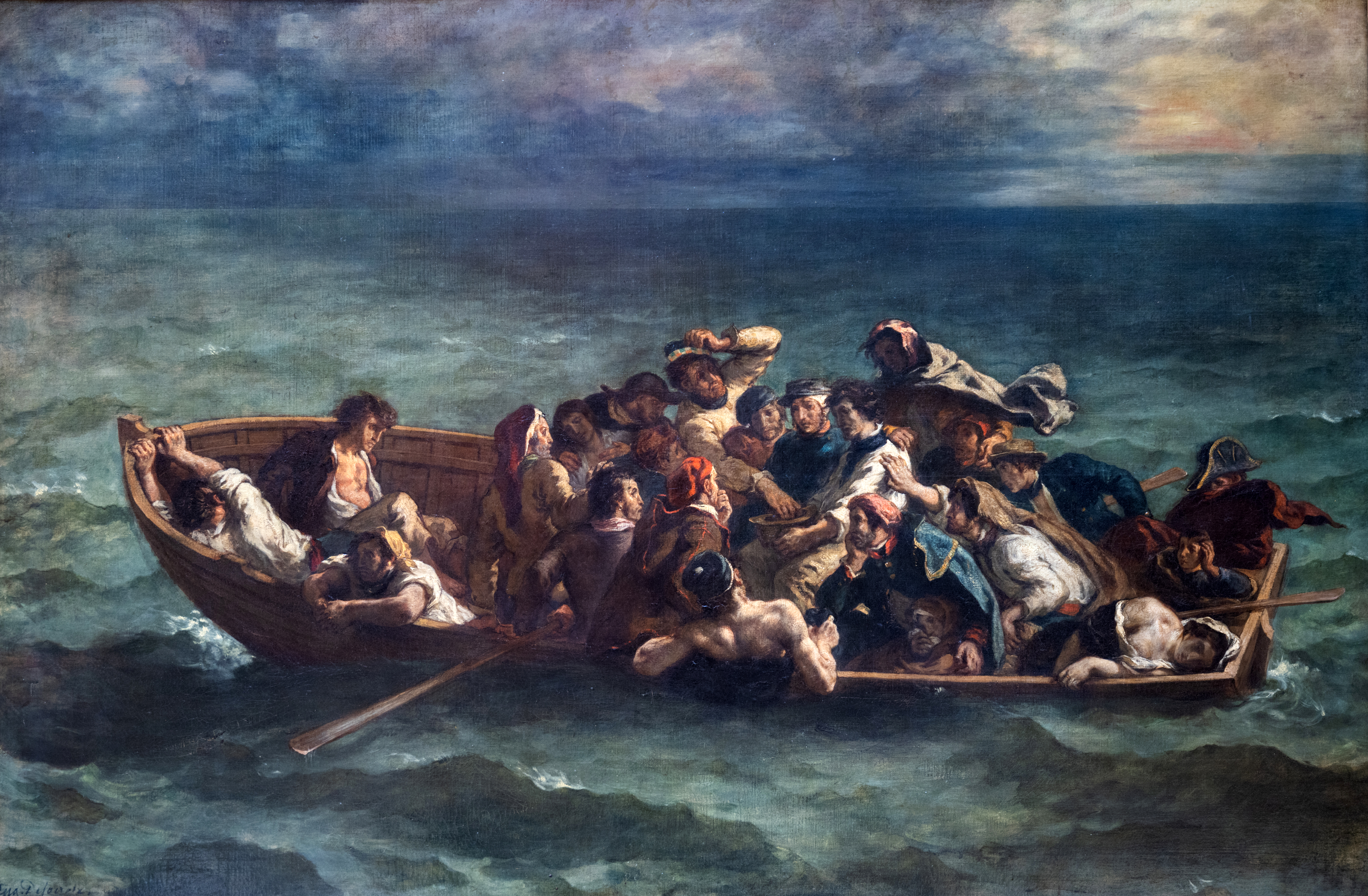
The Shipwreck of Don Juan by Eugène Delacroix, 1840

In Spain. Don Juan lives in Seville with his father, Don José, and his mother, Donna Inez. The romantic Donna Julia, the twenty-three-year-old wife of Don Alfonso, fancies and lusts for the sixteen-year-old boy Don Juan. Despite attempting to resist his charms, Julia enters into a love affair with Juan, and falls in love. Suspecting his wife's infidelity, Don Alfonso bursts into their bedroom, followed by his bodyguards who find no-one and nothing suspicious upon searching their master's bedroom, for Juan was hiding in the bed; Don Alfonso and his posse leave the room. Later returning alone to his bedroom, Don Alfonso comes across Juan's shoes and they fight for the woman, Donna Julia. Breaking off the fight with Don Alfonso, Don Juan escapes. To thwart rumours and the consequent bad reputation that her son has brought upon himself, Donna Inez sends Don Juan away to travel Europe, in hope that he develop a better sense of morality. The cuckold Don Alfonso punishes his faithless wife, Donna Julia, by interning her to a nunnery.

=== Canto II ===
Exiled from Seville. Don Juan travels to Cádiz, accompanied by Pedrillo, a tutor, and servants. Throughout the voyage, Juan pines for the love of Donna Julia, but seasickness distracts him. A storm wrecks the ship; Juan, his entourage, and some sailors escape in a long boat. Adrift in the Aegean Sea, they soon exhaust their supplies of food, they eat their leather shoes and clothes, and then they eat Don Juan's dog. The sailors turn cannibal and eat Pedrillo. They manage to catch some birds to eat, and a sleeping turtle. They drink sea water and the cannibal sailors go mad and die. They eventually wash up, after the boat overturning in a reef and killing more survivors, and Juan manages to make it onto the land before collapsing. The sight of land stops the remaining few from choosing someone else to eat. Juan and a couple other sailors never commit cannibalism. This Canto is largely based on accounts by survivors of the wreck of the Wager, including Byron’s grandfather, Admiral John Byron, who as a young man had endured the wreck of H.M.S. Wager off the coast of Chile.

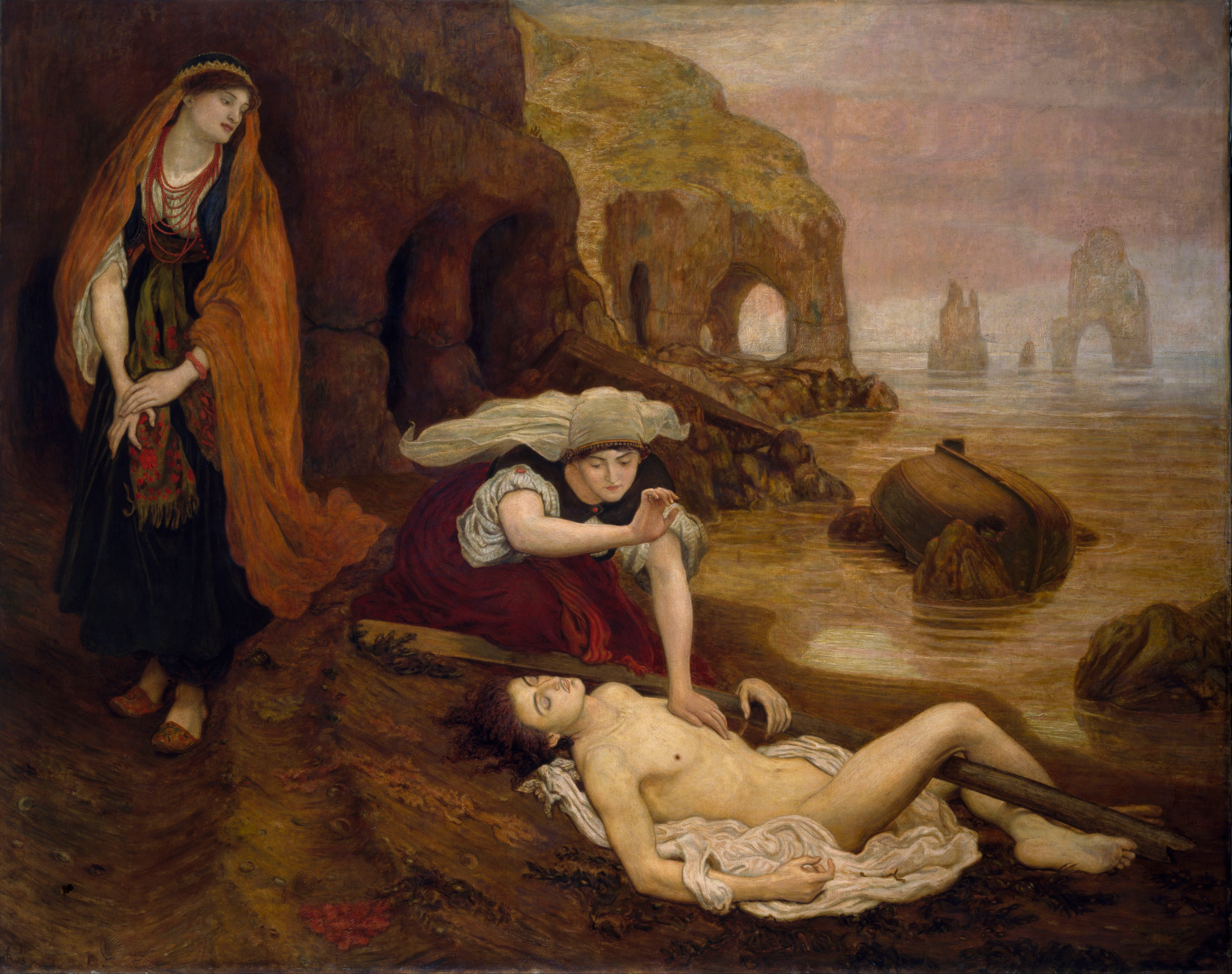
Finding of Don Juan by Haidee, 1873, by Ford Madox Brown

Juan is the sole survivor of the shipwreck and the escape in the long boat. Upon landfall at one of the Cyclades islands, two women, Haidée and Zoe, the latter being the maid of the former, discover the shipwrecked Juan and care for him in a cave at the beach. Haidée and Juan fall in love, despite neither speaking or understanding the language of the other. Moreover, Haidée's father, Lambro, is a pirate and a slaver who dislikes Don Juan. Haidee knows that if her father knew about Juan, that he would have him enslaved and sent to Constantinople, in the Ottoman Empire. She keeps him in a cave for around a month, and then when her father, goes on a voyage, then she brings Juan out on walks. Haidee teaches him some Greek, and the pair get ceremoniously 'wed' under the stars.

=== Canto III ===
The opening stanzas discuss the idea that 'Love and Marriage can rarely combine', and with mentions of the Fall. This Canto was originally merged with IV, but was later split into two. A digression. To give his political opinions about the Ottoman Empire's hegemony upon Greece, in "The Isles of Greece" section of canto III, Byron uses numeration and versification different from the style of verse and enumeration of the text about Don Juan. On returning to the adventures of Don Juan, the narrator vividly describes a catalogue of the celebrations of the lovers Haidée and Don Juan. At the time of Juan's ship-wrecked arrival to the island, the islanders believed that Lambro (Haidée's father) was dead, but he returns and witnesses the revels and his daughter in company of a man. Towards the end of canto III, Byron again digresses from the adventures of Don Juan in order to insult his literary rivals, the Lake Poets, specifically William Wordsworth (1770–1850), Robert Southey (1774–1843), and Samuel Taylor Coleridge (1772–1834).

=== Canto IV ===
On the island, the lovers Haidée and Don Juan wake to discover that her father, Lambro, has returned. Aided by his fellow pirates, Lambro enslaves Juan, and embarks him aboard a pirate ship delivering slaves to the slave market in Constantinople. Haidée despairs at losing her lover, and eventually dies of a broken heart, whilst pregnant with Don Juan's child.

=== Canto V ===
The Sultana of Constantinople. At the slave market, Don Juan converses with an Englishman named John Johnson, telling him of his lost love Haidée, whereas the more experienced John tells him of having to flee from his third wife. A black eunuch from the harem, Baba, buys the infidel slaves Juan and John, and takes them to the palace of the sultan. Taking them to an inner chamber, Baba insists that Don Juan dress as a woman, and threatens castration if Juan resists that demand. Finally, Juan is taken into an imperial hall to meet the sultana, Gulbeyaz, a beautiful, twenty-six-year-old woman, who is the fourth, last, and favourite wife of the sultan.

The proud Juan refuses to kiss the foot of Gulbeyaz, but compromises by kissing her hand, grateful of being rescued from enslavement. At the slave market, Gulbeyaz noticed Juan, and asked Baba to secretly buy him for her, despite risking discovery by the sultan. She wants Juan to love her, and then Gulbeyaz throws herself upon his breast. With Haidée still in his thoughts, Juan spurns Gulbeyaz's sexual advances, saying: "The prisoned eagle will not pair, nor I / Serve a sultana's sensual phantasy." Enraged by the rejection, Gulbeyaz thinks of having Juan beheaded, but, instead, she cries.

Before they can progress with their sexual relationship, Baba rushes in and announces to Gulbeyaz and Juan that the sultan is arriving: "The sun himself has sent me like a ray / To hint that he is coming up this way" (V. clviv, 1151). Preceded by an entourage of courtiers, concubines, and eunuchs, the sultan arrives and notices the presence of "Juanna", and is regretful "that a mere Christian should be half so pretty" (V. clv, 1240). In a Muslim culture, Don Juan is a giaour, a non-Muslim. The narrator Byron then comments that "in the East, they are extremely strict, / And Wedlock and a Padlock mean the same" (V. clviii, 1258).

=== Canto VI ===
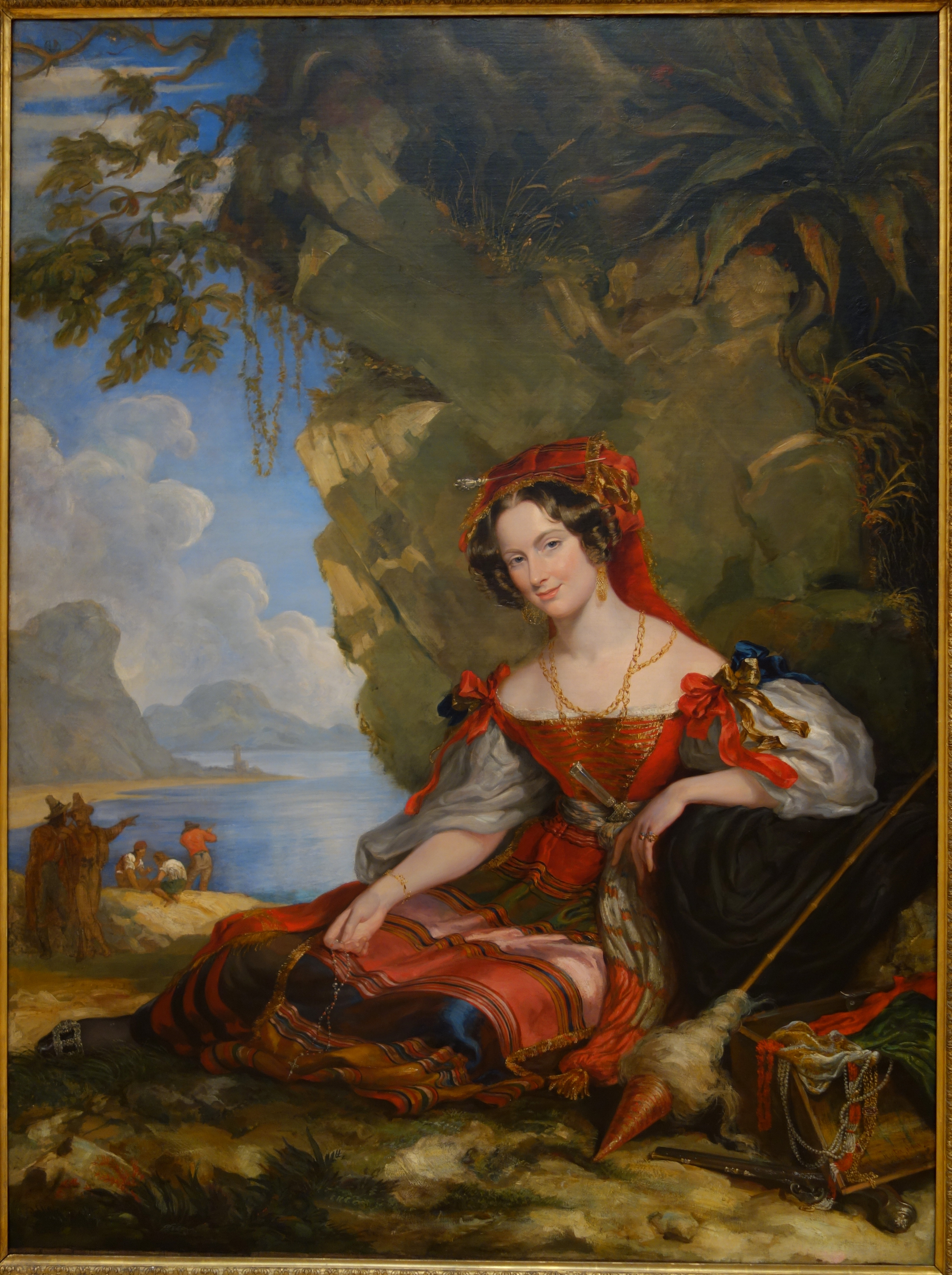
Portrait of Lady Caroline Montagu by George Hayter, 1831. She is depicted as Haidée.

The seraglio. The sultan and the sultana retire for the evening, and Don Juan, still dressed as the woman "Juanna", is taken to the crowded harem, where the odalisques reside. Juanna must share a couch with Dudù, a pretty seventeen-year-old girl. When asked his name, Don Juan calls himself "Juanna". The narrator tells that Dudù is a "kind of sleepy Venus ... very fit to murder sleep.... Her talents were of the more silent class ... pensive...." Dudù gives Juanna a chaste kiss and undresses.

At three o'clock in the morning, whilst the harem sleep, Dudù screams and awakens agitated, whilst the snoring Juanna continues asleep. The odalisques ask the reason for her screams, and Dudù relates a sexually suggestive dream, of being in a wood, like Dante, of dislodging a golden apple that tenaciously clings to the bough, of almost biting that forbidden fruit, when a bee flies out from the apple and stings her to the heart. The matron of the seraglio decides to place Juanna with another odalisque, but Dudù begs to keep her as companion in her couch. The narrator Byron does not know why Dudù screamed whilst asleep.

In the morning, the sultana Gulbeyaz asks Baba to tell her how Don Juan, as "Juanna", passed the night at the harem. Baba tells of Juanna's night, but omits details about Dudù and her dream. Suspicious, the sultana becomes jealous and then enraged, and instructs Baba to kill Dudù and Juan in the usual manner, by drowning. The eunuch pleads with the sultana that killing Don Juan will not cure what ails her; Gulbeyaz then summons Dudù and Juan. Before canto VI concludes, the narrator Byron explains that the "Muse will take a little touch at warfare."

=== Canto VII ===
Escape. Don Juan and John Johnson escape the harem in company of two women. Consequent to fleeing the palace of the Sultan of Constantinople, the four reach the Danube river during the Russian Siege of Izmail (1789–1790), a Turkish fort at the mouth of the river, on the Black Sea. The Imperial Russian field marshal Alexander Suvorov is preparing the final assault against the fortress at Izmail. As the battle for the fort rages, Prince Grigory Potemkin, the Russian commander-in-chief, orders Marshal Suvorov to "take Ismail at whatever price", for the greater glory of Catherine II, the Christian great empress of Russia. In the event, John Johnson presents himself to Suvorov (with whom he fought in battle at Widdin, in Bulgaria) and introduces his friend Don Juan, saying that both men are ready to join the Christian fight against the pagan Turks. Marshal Suvorov is very unhappy that John and Juan have appeared at the Siege of Izmail, in company of two women who claim to be the wives of soldiers. To assuage Suvorov to consent to the women remaining with them, Juan and John tell him that the women aided their escape from the Turks.

=== Canto VIII ===
At war. As brave soldiers in the Imperial Russian army, Don Juan and John Johnson prove fearless in the savagery and carnage of the Russian siege upon the Turks. To conquer the fort of Izmail, the Russians kill 40,000 Turks, including the women and the children. Being a man of noble character, Don Juan rescues a ten-year-old Muslim girl from two Christian Cossacks intent upon raping and killing her for being a pagan. In that moment, Don Juan resolves to adopt the girl as his child. In the course of battle against the Christian Russians, a Tatar Khan and his five nobleman sons valiantly fight to the death. From the aftermath of the Siege of Izmail, Don Juan emerges a hero, and then is sent to Saint Petersburg, accompanied by the rescued Muslim girl; he's vowed to protect her as a daughter. The end of canto X reveals the girl's name: "Leila".

=== Canto IX ===
In Russia. At the Imperial Russian court, the uniformed Don Juan is a dashing, handsome, and decorated soldier who readily impresses Empress Catherine the Great, who also is infatuated with and lustful for him. The Empress Catherine is a woman of forty-eight-years who is "just now in juicy vigour". At court, Don Juan becomes one of her favourites, and is flattered by the sexual interest of the Empress, which earns him a promotion in rank; thus "Love is vanity, / Selfish in its beginning as its end, / Except where ’tis a mere insanity". Privately, Don Juan concerns himself with the health, education, and welfare of the Muslim girl he rescued at the siege of Izmail.

=== Canto X ===
In canto XI of the poem Don Juan, Lord Byron refers to John Keats as a poet "who was kill'd off by one critique". (portrait by William Hilton)

Russian life. The cold clime of Russia makes Don Juan fall ill, so Empress Catherine sends him west-ward, to the warmer, temperate clime of England, accompanied by Leila. Ostensibly, Don Juan is a special envoy from the court of Imperial Russia with nebulous diplomatic responsibilities for negotiating a treaty between Russia and Britain. In fact, Don Juan's special-envoy job is a sinecure, by which Empress Catherine secures his health, his favour, and his finances.

=== Canto XI ===
In Britain. Having arrived to England, and then making his way to London, Don Juan muses upon the democratic greatness of Britain as defender of the freedoms of ordinary men—until interrupted by a menacing cockney footpad, a robber demanding either his money or his life. In self-defence, Don Juan shoots the footpad, but, as a man possessed of a strong conscience, he regrets his violent haste and tends the wound of the dying robber. Don Juan's medical effort fails and the robber mutters his last words and dies on the London street. Later, as an envoy of Russia, Don Juan is received at the English court, where the courtiers are in wonder of Juan's handsome visage, in admiration of his dress, and charmed by his mien and personality, which provoke the jealousy of some of the elder peers. In canto XI, Byron mentions John Keats (1795–1821) as a poet "who was kill'd off by one critique".

=== Canto XII ===
Leila safeguarded. In effort to pursue his life and interests, in England, Don Juan first safeguards his adopted daughter, Leila, by seeking, finding, and employing a suitable guardian for her, in the person of Lady Pinchbeck, a woman whom London society consider a person of good character, possessed of admirable wit, but rumoured to be unchaste.

=== Canto XIII ===
In society. At the house of Lady Adeline Amundeville and her husband, Lord Henry Amundeville, the narrator informs that Don Juan's hostess, Lady Adeline, is "the fair most fatal Juan ever met", the "queen bee, the glass of all that's fair, / Whose charms made all men speak and women dumb". Anglo–Russian diplomatic relations require meetings between Lord Henry and Don Juan ("the envoy of a secret Russian mission") whom the lord befriends into a regular guest at their mansion in London. Lady and Lord Amundeville invite distinguished guests to a party at their estate in the country. The narrator then describes the country environs of the Amundeville estate and the décor of the estate house, which then are followed with mock-catalogues of the social activities and of the personalities of the upper-class ladies and gentlemen who are the high society of royal Britain. The narrator Byron views the country party of the Amundevilles as English ennui. Canto XIII concludes with the guests and their hosts retiring for the evening.

=== Canto XIV ===
Country life. During a fox hunt, Don Juan acquits himself in riding to the hounds, proving to be a handsome, dashing, and witty man who is very attractive to the lady guests at the Amundeville country house, including the flirtatious Duchess of Fitz-Fulke, who has set her eye upon him. Jealous of the experienced duchess, who has had many love affairs, the hostess, Lady Adeline, resolves to protect the "inexperienced" Don Juan from the sexual enticements and depredations of the Duchess of Fitz-Fulke. Although Lady Adeline and Don Juan both are twenty-one years old, and, despite having a vacant heart and a cold, but proper marriage to Lord Henry, she is not in love with Don Juan. Later, the narrator Byron tells the reader whether or not Lady Adeline and Don Juan entered into a love affair; about which canto XIV contains the line: "'Tis strange—but true; for truth is always strange; Stranger than fiction".

=== Canto XV ===
The company of women. Lady Adeline is at risk of losing her honour, because of her apparent relation with Don Juan, whose passive, seductive manner is deceptive, because he never seems anxious to consummate the seduction; and, being personally modest, Don Juan neither brooks nor claims superiority. To thwart the social disgrace suggested by the appearance of sexual impropriety, Lady Adeline advises marriage to Don Juan, with which suggestion he agrees, but acknowledges that he usually is attracted to married women. In effort to deduce a suitable match for him, Lady Adeline deliberately omits mention of Aurora Raby, who is a Catholic, sixteen-year-old girl most suitable to pair and marry with Don Juan. Although attracted to Aurora, because she is purer of heart than the other women Lady Adeline mentioned, the adolescent girl reminds Don Juan of Haidée, the daughter of the pirate Lambro, who sold Juan into slavery at Constantinople. The narrator then describes the elaborate dinner at which Don Juan is seated between Aurora and Lady Adeline. Initially laconic, Aurora soon warms to the spirit of the occasion, and contributes conversation during dinner.

=== Canto XVI ===
Seduced by a ghost. Smitten by her beauty, Don Juan thinks of Aurora when retiring to his rooms; that night, he walks the hall outside his rooms, viewing the paintings that decorate the walls. Hearing footfalls in the hallway, he sees a friar in cowl and beads, and asks if it be ghost or dream; despite the figure's pacing, the hood hides the face from Don Juan. In the morn, Don Juan's pale face turns Lady Adeline pale. Noticing the response of her hostess, the Duchess of Fitz-Fulke gives a hard-eyed look to Don Juan, whilst the adolescent Aurora looks at him "with a kind of calm surprise".

Lady Adeline asks if he is ill; Lord Henry says that Don Juan saw the "Black Friar" pace the hallway at night, and then tells of the "spirit of these walls", who was often seen in the past, but not of late. That on honeymoon with Lady Adeline, he saw the ghost of the Black Friar haunt the halls of the house. Accompanying herself with a harp, Lady Adeline sings the story of the ghost of the Black Friar; Aurora is silent, whilst Lady Fitz-Fulke appears mischievous. The narrator suggests that Lady Adeline sang to dispel Don Juan's dismay.

The domestic staff of the house realise preparations for that evening's dinner party, whilst Don Juan failed to dispel dismay. The domestic affairs of the Amundeville estate include assorted petitioners and a pregnant country girl seeking legal remedy from Lord Henry, in his capacity as justice of the peace.

At dinner, Lady Adeline performs as hostess, the Duchess of Fitz-Fulke is at her ease, and Don Juan is again preoccupied with his thoughts. Glancing at Aurora, he spies a smile creasing her cheeks, but is uncertain of its meaning, because she is quiet and her face slightly flushed. When hosts and guests retire for the night, Don Juan again thinks of Aurora, who has reawakened romantic feelings he thought lost in the past. That night, from his rooms, Don Juan again hears footfalls in the hallway, expecting the Black Friar's ghost. The door opens, but the hood conceals the face; Don Juan pursues and pushes the ghost against a wall, and smells a sweet breath, sees red lips and straggling curls, and a pearl necklace that frames a glowing bust. Don Juan pulls back the hood to reveal the voluptuous Duchess of Fitz-Fulke.

=== Canto XVII ===
Truncated story. When Lord Byron died in 1824, the epic satire Don Juan was incomplete, and the concluding canto XVII featured little mention of the protagonist, Don Juan, and many mentions of the literary rivals, enemies, and critics who moralistically objected to Byron’s perspectives of people, life, and society; the critical gist was: "If you are right, then everybody's wrong!" In self-defence, Byron the poet lists people who were considered revolutionaries in their fields of endeavour—such as Martin Luther (1483–1546) and Galileo (1564–1642)—whose societies saw them as being outside the cultural mainstream of their times. Canto XVII concludes at the brink of resuming the adventures of Don Juan, last found in a "tender moonlit situation" with the Duchess of Fitz-Fulke, at the end of canto XVI.

== Dedication to Robert Southey ==
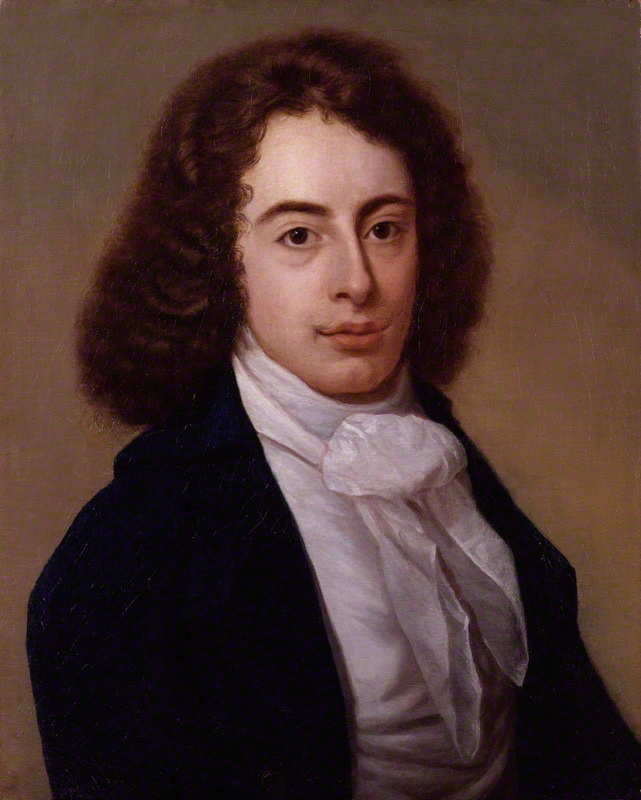
Lord Byron dedicated Don Juan (1819–1824) to Robert Southey, his artistic rival and the Poet Laureate of Britain (1813–1843).

Lord Byron scornfully dedicated Don Juan (1819–1824) to his artistic rival and enemy Robert Southey, who then was the incumbent Poet Laureate of Britain (1813–43); in stanza III Byron said: "You, Bob! are rather insolent, you know, / At being disappointed in your wish / To supersede all warblers here below, / And be the only Blackbird in the dish; / And then you overstrain yourself, or so, / And tumble downward like the flying fish / Gasping on the deck, because you soar too high, Bob, / And fall, for lack of moisture quite a-dry, Bob!" This reference seems to be a dig at unsuccessful copulation.

Moreover, the poem's Dedication further pursued artistic quarrels—of subject and theme, composition and style—with the Lake Poets, whom Byron addressed:

Collectively:

You—Gentlemen! by dint of long seclusion
From better company, have kept your own
At Keswick, and, through still continued fusion
Of one another's minds, at last have grown
To deem as a most logical conclusion,
That Poesy has wreaths for you alone:
There is a narrowness in such a notion,
Which makes me wish you'd change your lakes for ocean

— Dedication: stanza V.

Individually:

And Coleridge, too, has lately taken wing,
But like a hawk encumber'd with his hood,—
Explaining metaphysics to the nation—
I wish he would explain his Explanation.

— Dedication, stanza II, lines 5–8

Precisely:

About the works of Wordsworth, Byron said "'Tis poetry—at least by his assertion" (IV.5), and Henry James Pye, the previous poet laureate, Byron criticised by pun: "four and twenty Blackbirds in a pye" (I.8), edged wordplay derived from the nursery song "Sing a Song of Sixpence".

== Critical reception ==
=== Background ===
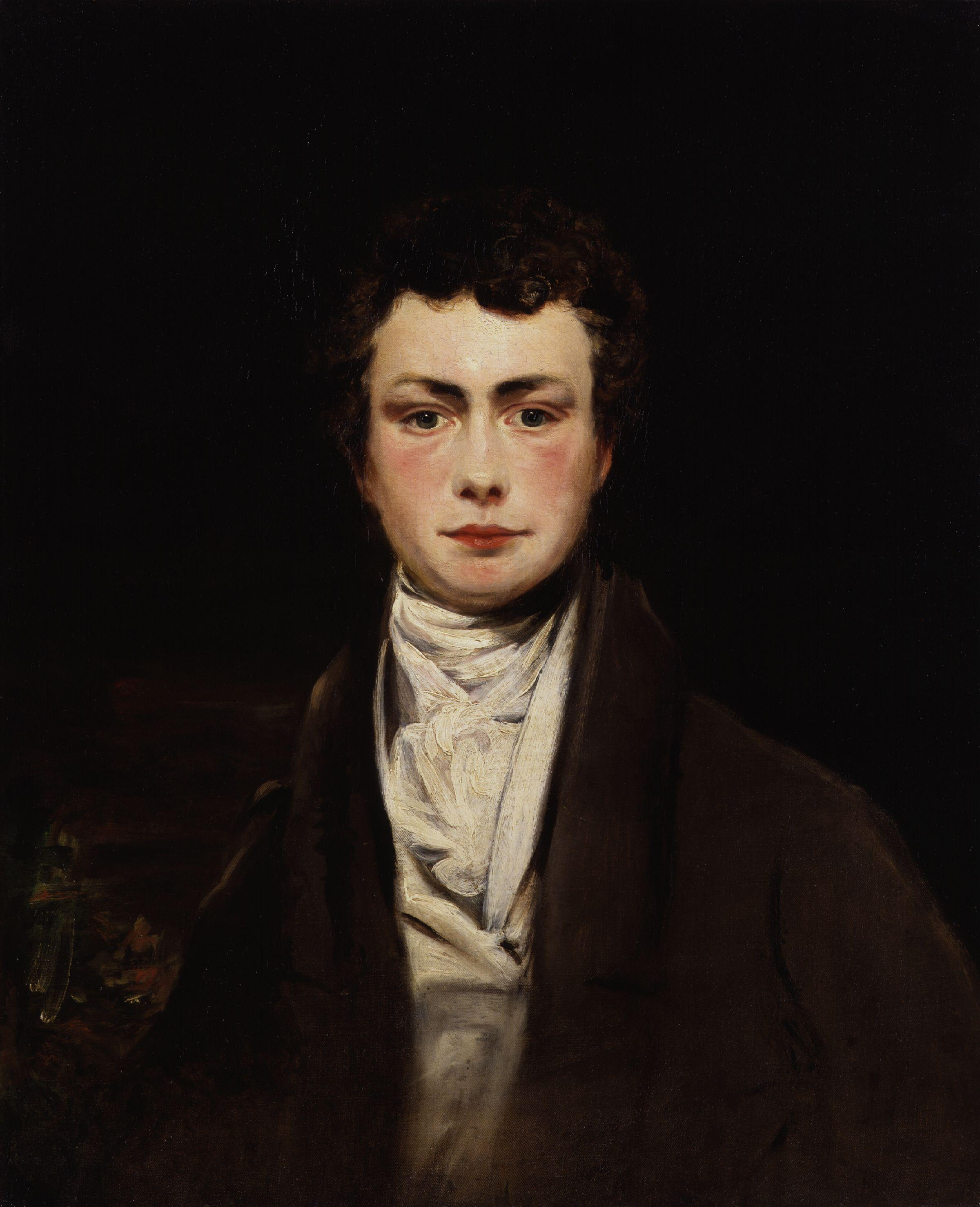
Lord Byron corresponded with the Irish poet Thomas Moore about the poetical style of Don Juan and of the social satire in the story.

In the early 19th century, despite the piecemeal publication of the poem in 1819, the contemporary literary critics said that Don Juan was an immoral poetical work in which narrative Lord Byron was too free in satirising the social subjects of the poem, which made persons and personages readily identifiable. Concerning the poem's origins, Byron said that Don Juan resulted from the "humorous paradoxes ... provoked by [the] advice and opposition" of friends and colleagues, rivals and enemies. In a letter (19 September 1818) to the Irish poet Thomas Moore, Byron spoke of satirical intent: "I have finished the first canto ... of a poem in the style and manner of Beppo [1818], encouraged by the good success of the same. It [the new poem] is ... meant to be a little quietly facetious upon every thing. But I doubt whether it is not—at least as far as it has gone—too free for these very modest days."

A month after the publication of cantos I and II, in a letter (12 August 1819) to publisher John Murray, Byron said: "You ask me for the plan of Donny Johnny; I have no plan—I had no plan; but I had or have materials.... You are too earnest and eager about [Don Juan] a work never intended to be serious. Do you suppose that I could have any intention but to giggle and make giggle?—a playful satire, with as little poetry as could be helped, was what I meant."

After the completion, but before the publication of cantos III, IV, and V, in a letter (16 February 1821) to Murray, Byron said: "The Fifth [canto] is so far from being the last of Don Juan, that it is hardly the beginning. I meant to take him the tour of Europe, with a proper mixture of siege, battle, and adventure, and to make him finish as Anacharsis Cloots in the French Revolution.... I meant to have made him a Cavalier Servente in Italy, and a cause for a divorce in England, and a Sentimental Werther–faced man in Germany, so as to show the different ridicules of the society in each of these countries, and to have displayed him gradually gâté and blasé, as he grew older, as is natural. But I had not quite fixed whether to make him end in Hell, or in an unhappy marriage, not knowing which would be the severest."

=== Artistic recognition ===
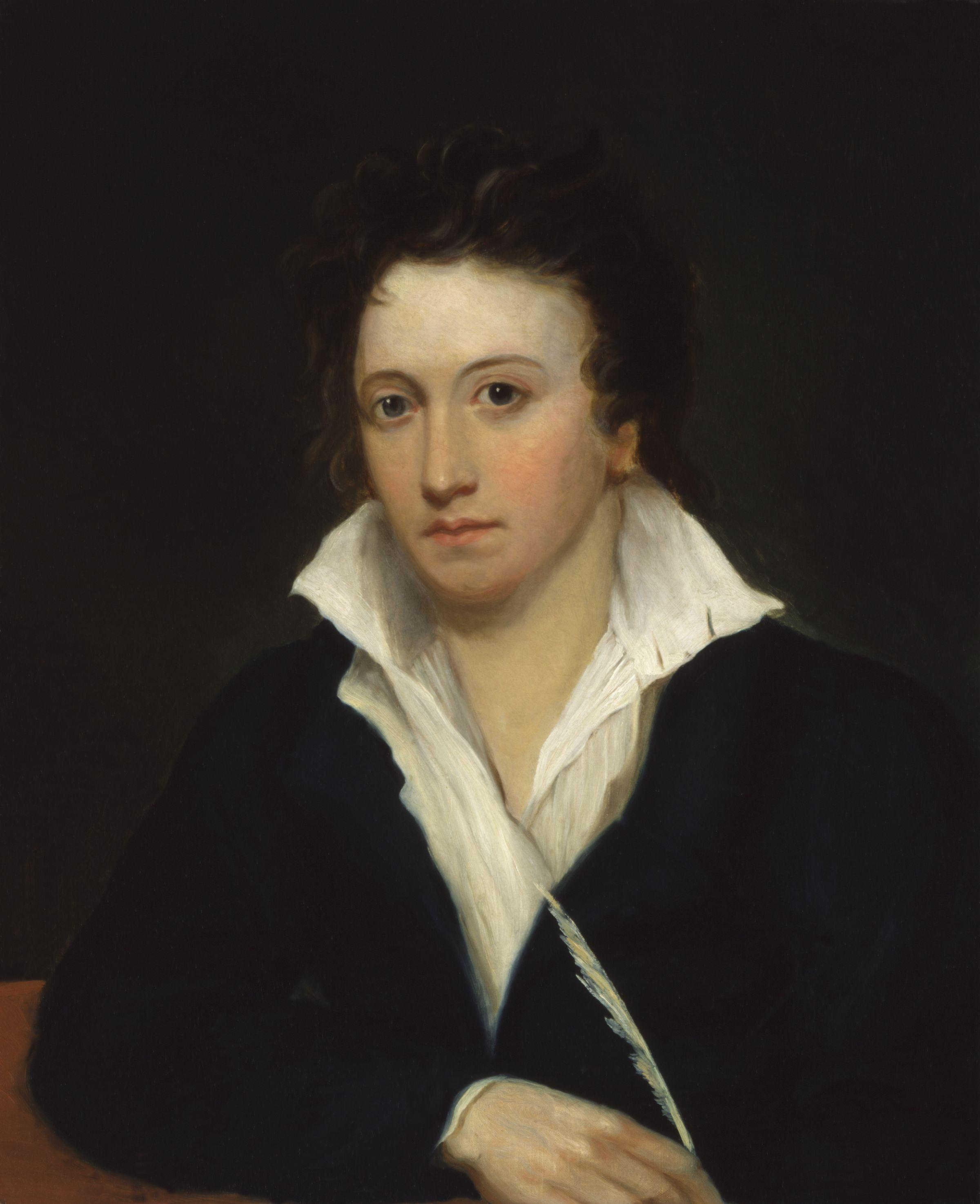
The Romantic poet P. B. Shelley much admired Lord Byron's style of writing in achieving the tone of epic narrative in Don Juan.

In 1821, in a letter about the cantos III, IV, and V, the poet P. B. Shelley told Byron of his "wonder and delight" at the presentation of events, because in the composition and style, "this poem carries with it at once the stamp of originality and defiance of imitation. Nothing has ever been written like it in English, nor, if I may venture to prophesy, will there be, unless carrying upon it the mark of a secondary and borrowed light.... You are building up a drama such as England has not yet seen, and the task is sufficiently noble and worthy of you." About canto V, Shelley told Byron that "Every word has the stamp of immortality.... It fulfils, in a certain degree, what I have long preached of producing—something wholly new and relative to the age, and yet surpassingly beautiful".

In 1824, Walter Scott said that in Don Juan Lord Byron's writing "has embraced every topic of human life, and sounded every string of the divine harp, from its slightest to its most powerful and heart-astounding tones." In Germany, Goethe translated parts of Don Juan, because he considered Byron's writing "a work of boundless genius."

In 1885, being neither disciple nor encomiast of Lord Byron, Algernon Charles Swinburne (1837–1909) said that the narrative strength and thematic range of Don Juan are how Byron's poetical writing excites the reader: "Across the stanzas ... we swim forward as over the ‘broad backs of the sea’; they break and glitter, hiss and laugh, murmur and move like waves that sound or that subside. There is in them a delicious resistance, an elastic motion, which salt water has and fresh water has not. There is about them a wide wholesome air, full of vivid light and constant wind, which is only felt at sea. Life undulates and Death palpitates in the splendid verse.... This gift of life and variety is the supreme quality of Byron's chief poem."

== Translations ==
Tatiana Gnedich translated it from memory into Russian while incarcerated in a Soviet prison during the Stalin years. After she was released, she had it published in 1959. Further editions followed, and Byron became much better known in Russia than before.
