= Marcantonius Majoragio =

Italian philosopher (1514–1555)

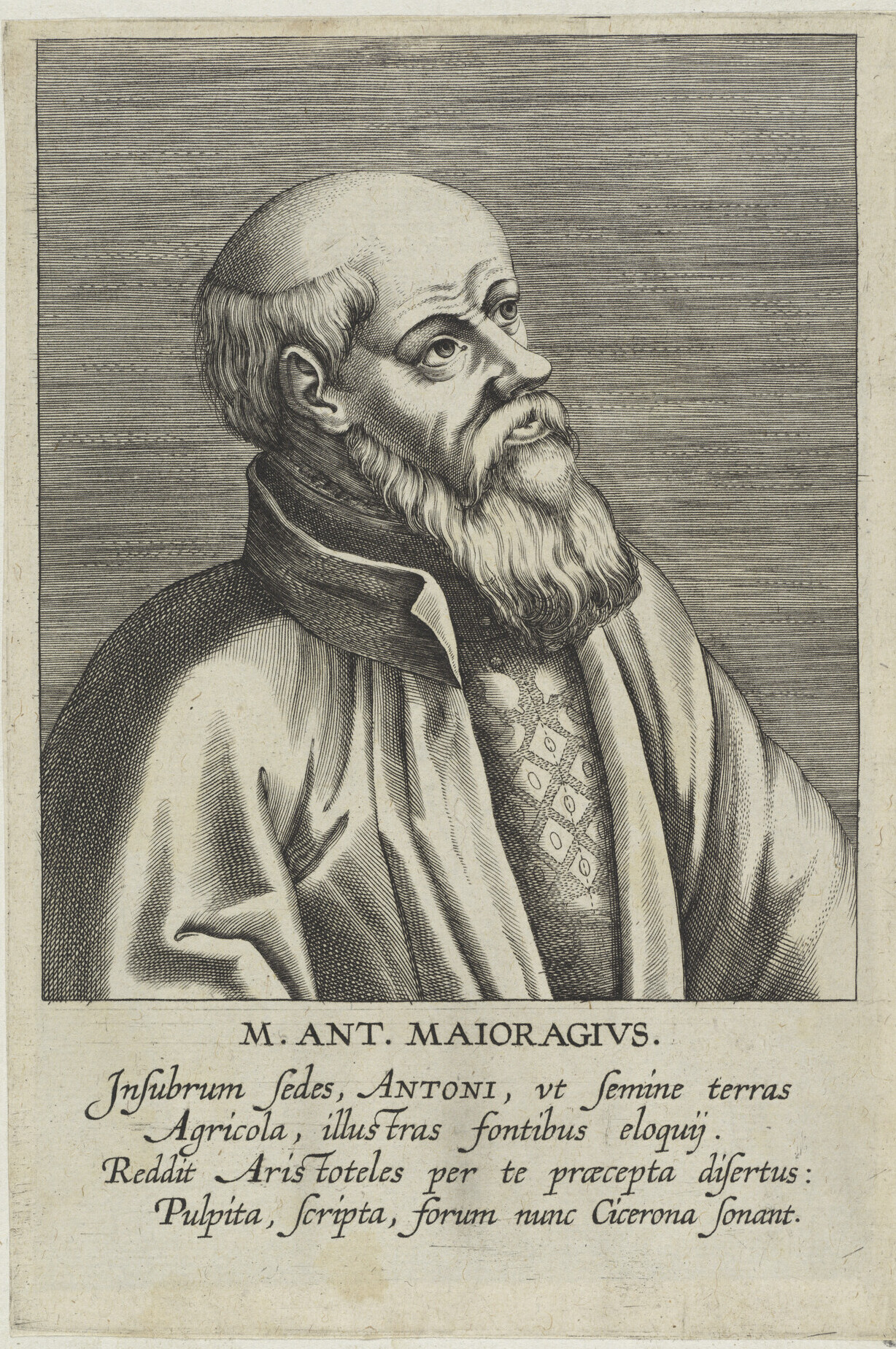
- Marcantonius Majoragio
- Born: Antonio Maria Conti; 26 October 1514; Mairago, Duchy of Milan
- Died: 4 April 1555 (aged 40); Milan, Duchy of Milan
- Resting place: Basilica of Sant'Ambrogio
- Occupation: Renaissance humanist

Marcantonius Majoragio (26 October 1514 – 4 April 1555) was a writer and philosopher, active in Northern Italy during the Renaissance period.

== Biography ==
Marcantonius Majoragio was born Antonio Maria Conti in the village of Majoragio (Mairago), near Milan.

In 1540, at the age of 26, Majoragio was appointed professor of eloquence in Milan. Aside from a brief retreat to Ferrara during the Italian War of 1542–1546, he held this position for the rest of his life. During his stay in Ferrara, he attended law courses taught by Andrea Alciato and philosophy courses taught by Vincenzo Maggi, and struck up a friendship with the lexicographer and Latinist Bartolomeo Ricci. Back in Milan, in 1546 he founded the Accademia dei Trasformati, modelled on the ancient schools of declamation. The Accademia was to become an important meeting point for Milanese Renaissance intellectuals.

A prominent philologist and scholar, in his Decisiones XXV (1544) Majoragio defended Cicero's De Officiis from the attacks of Celio Calcagnini. In his main work, the dialogue Antiparadoxon, Majoragio turned against Cicero, systematically refuting all six Stoic paradoxes defended in Cicero's Paradoxa Stoicorum. Majoragio argued that Cicero misrepresented Socrates, and contended that Cicero’s arguments were demonstrably false and relied more on clever wordplay and rhetorical flourishes than sound reasoning.

Majoragio believed in Platonic Christianity, and thought that those who expressed contrary thoughts, that there was no after-life and the present material world was the only world that exists should be righteously condemned to the fate of having themselves burnt alive, and additionally those punished thus, to be in full consciousness during such an act.

== Works ==
Majoragio produced the following:

- A 1546 work of criticism against Paradoxa Stoicorum
- A 1547 commentary on Aristotle's Rhetoric.
- A 1552 commentary on Cicero's Orator.
- A commentary on the first book of Cicero's De Oratore, published posthumously in 1587.

== Bibliography ==
- Ricciardi, Roberto (1983). "CONTI, Antonio Maria". Dizionario Biografico degli Italiani (in Italian). Vol. 28: Conforto–Cordero. Rome: Institute of the Italian Encyclopaedia. ISBN 978-88-12-00032-6.
