= Il giorno (poem) =

1763 poem by Giuseppe Parini

Il giorno ("The Day")
- by Giuseppe Parini
- Original title: Il giorno (Italian)
- Country: Italy
- Language: Italian
- Publication date: 1763
- Pages: 62
- OCLC: 563480692

"Il giorno" ("The Day") is a poem written by Giuseppe Parini (1729–1799), first published in 1763. It is an ironic and satirical representation of the aristocracy of his time. His poem represents the beginning of polite literature in Italy.

It was originally divided into three parts: Il mattino, Il mezzogiorno and La sera ("Morning", "Midday" and "Evening"). The last part was later divided into two separate parts, Il vespro and La notte ("Evening" and "Night").

== Plot ==
=== Il mattino ===
In Il mattino (The Morning), Parini writes about the beginning of a young man's day. It begins with his waking up and continues with the breakfast and the choice of it. The young man can choose between several drinks, from chocolate (if he needs to digest the dinner of the last night) to coffee (if he tends to become fat). It continues with some welcome and unwelcome meetings, the toeletta and the reading of some letters. Then he gets out to meet his lady (aristocratic ladies of this period of time had both a husband and a gallant, called a cicisbeo, to pass the day with).

=== Il mezzogiorno or the Meriggio ===
The young man, on arriving at the lady's house, eats with her and meets the husband of the lady, who appears bored and frigid, but not in the least resentful of the presence of the lover (he probably has a mistress of his own somewhere). Lunch is followed by coffee and games.

=== Il vespro ===
The young man and the lady meet friends and wander about the streets with a carriage while they speak about several things.

=== La notte ===
The two lovers go to a meeting. In this phase the author describes people in the hall and makes some comments about them. Then, all the people play cards together and at the end of this, the day of the young man is concluded. He will go to sleep at the dead of night to get up late the following morning.

== Style ==
The ostensible purpose of this poem is to give instructions, in immense detail, about how to fill the "simple day" of a young aristocratic man. It clearly gives an ironic vision of this class, as Parini ostensibly exalts the aristocracy but in reality gives a critical vision of them. (When the young man visits the baths, he may feel some faint suspicion, swiftly dismissed, that he is the same type of creature as men of common clay.)

The effect of the poem depends on the comic contrast between the banality and futility of the day of the young man and the exalted epic style of the writing used by the author to describe it, drawing heavily on Homer (ca. 8th century BC) and Vergil (70 BC – 19 BC). The technique is somewhat similar to that of The Rape of the Lock (1712) by Alexander Pope (1688–1744).

== See also ==
- 1763 in poetry

== Bibliography ==
- Alessandro Cont, "Ove pennello industre l'imagin tua ritrasse": i gusti e gli studi del Giovin Signore nell'Italia del Settecento, "Rivista storica italiana", 128, 1 (aprile 2016), pp. 106-148
