= Beppo (poem) =

1817 poem by Lord Byron

First edition to include Byron as the author. Fifth edition. 1818.

Beppo: A Venetian Story is a long poem by Lord Byron, written in Venice in 1817. Beppo marks Byron's first attempt at writing using the Italian ottava rima metre, which emphasized satiric digression. It is the precursor to Byron's most famous and generally considered most successful poem, Don Juan. The poem contains 760 verses, divided into 95 stanzas.

The work was composed in Venice between September and October 1817 and first published on 28 February 1818. The work, initially comprising 95 stanzas and expanded to 99 in a subsequent edition, the 4th, was issued on 4 May 1818. The fifth edition was the first to name Lord Byron as the author. The work went through seven editions in 1818 alone. In the fourth edition, four verses were added to the text.

It is a satirical narrative poem that centers on Laura, a resident of Venice, who mistakenly assumes her sailor husband, Giussepe, known as Beppo, died at sea. She subsequently establishes a romantic relationship with a Count. During a Carnival celebration, however, her husband Beppo reveals himself wearing a turban after he had been taken prisoner by pirates. They ultimately achieve a reconciliation.

The work satirizes English morality and its hypocritical stand on infidelity, criticizes British society and customs, and switches to an ottava rima format that allows for a conversational tone.

== Narrative ==
The poem tells the story of a Venetian lady, Laura, whose husband, Giuseppe (or "Beppo" for short), has been lost at sea for the past three years. According to Venetian customs she takes on a Cavalier Servente, simply called "the Count". When the two of them attend the Venetian Carnival, she is closely observed by a Turk who turns out to be her missing husband. Beppo explains that he has been captured and enslaved, and was freed by a band of pirates that he subsequently joined. Having accumulated enough money he left piracy and returned to reclaim his wife and be re-baptized. Laura rejoins Beppo and befriends the Count.

== Analysis and allusions ==
1818 first edition title page.

The poem's main merit lies in its comparison of English and Italian morals, arguing that the English aversion to adultery is mere hypocrisy in light of the probably shocking, but more honest, custom of the Cavalier Servente in Italy. In comparison to Byron's Oriental Tales of 1813, it suggests that a looser attitude towards morals may be more pragmatic.

The poem manifests a number of typical Byronic qualities, like the digressive structure and the use of satirical jabs at targets familiar to Byron's readership, such as literate women and as well as other poets (including Robert Southey, who appears as "Botherby"). As he does in major poems like Childe Harold's Pilgrimage and Don Juan, in Beppo Byron mixes fictional elements with autobiographical ones.

Reputedly, Lady William Russell was the inspiration for "[one] whose bloom could, after dancing, dare the dawn".

The four verses or stanzas added to Beppo in the fourth edition (1818) are Stanzas 28, 38, 39, and 80. Stanza 28: "Like a picture by Giorgione" (Added to expand on the description of Venetian women). Stanzas 38 & 39: (Added to expand on the description of the Carnival and the narrator's commentary). Stanza 80: (Added as part of the satirical commentary near the end of the poem).

== Sources ==
- Bonet, Anna. "The five best novels about mid-life, according to Ben Markovits. His own books examine the way people change over time. Here, the author shares the books about middle age that have inspired him." The i Paper. November 1, 2025.
- Ceramella, Nick. "Byron’s Beppo: A Venetian Story." The contrast between Italian and English manners. ACT: Art - Culture - Tourism. November 18, 2025. Updated: November 25, 2025. Retrieved 31 January 2026.
- Cochran, Peter. "Why We Need a New Text of Beppo." Newstead Abbey Byron Society. 2009. Retrieved 31 January 2026.
- Cochran, Peter (2011). Byron and Italy. Newcastle-upon-Tyne: Cambridge Scholars. ISBN 978-1-4438-3602-9.
- Drucker, Peter. "Byron and Ottoman love: Orientalism, Europeanization and same sex sexualities in the early nineteenth-century Levant" (Journal of European Studies, vol. 42, no. 2, June 2012, 140–57).
- Elfenbein, Andrew. Byron and the Victorians. (Studies in Nineteenth-Century Literature and Culture). Cambridge University Press, 1995. ISBN 978-0-5214-5452-0.
- Fisher, James. "'Here The Story Ends': Byron's Beppo, A Broken Dante." The Byron Journal, Number 21, 1 January 1993. https://doi.org/10.3828/BJ.1993.4.
- Garrett, Martin. Palgrave Literary Dictionary of Byron. Palgrave, 2010. ISBN 978-0-230-00897-7.
- Guiccioli, Teresa, contessa di. Lord Byron's Life in Italy, translator Michael Rees, ed. Peter Cochran, 2005, ISBN 0-87413-716-0.
- Rawes, Alan and Diego Saglia, eds. Byron and Italy. University of Manchester Press, 1 February 2018.
- Thomson, Alastair W. "A Nameless Sort of Person": Byron's 'Beppo'." Études Anglaises; Paris, Vol. 48, Iss. 1, (Jan 1, 1995): 50.
