= Accademia dei Trasformati =

16th-century learned society in Italy

- Abbreviation: I Trasformati
- Formation: 1546
- Headquarters: Milan, Duchy of Milan
- Official language: Italian
- Remarks: Motto: Et steriles platani malos gessere valentes ("And the barren plane trees have borne a worthy fruit")

The Accademia dei Trasformati (Academy of the Transformed) was a learned society established in Milan during the 16th-century.

== History ==
=== First Accademia, 1546 ===
The Accademia dei Trasformati was founded in 1546 by a group of Milanese intellectuals led by the philologist Marcantonius Majoragio, the polymath Gerolamo Cardano and the poet Camillo da Rho. Its symbol was a plane tree and its motto was Et steriles platani malos gessere valentes (Virgil, Georgics, 2,70). The Accademia probably met in the Milanese home of the wealthy patrician Lancellotto Fagnani, where Majoragio set his most famous work, the Ciceronian dialogue Antiparadoxon. Its primary focus was the study of Italian language and poetry. In 1548, it produced a printed collection of Sonetti by twelve different authors.

=== Accademia re-foundation, 1743 ===
The Accademia dei Trasformati dissolved after Majoragio's death in 1555 but was revived in 1743 by Count Giuseppe Maria Imbonati, a prominent Milanese intellectual and a member of the Academy of Arcadia. Imbonati wanted to preserve the emblem and motto of the original Trasformati, and agreed to cover the institution's costs. On 6 July 1743, he was elected Conservatore Perpetuo (Perpetual Patron/Curator) of the Academy.

At its height, the Accademia counted more than a hundred members. Its membership consisted primarily of aristocrats and high-ranking clergy, although it also included middle-class intellectuals such as Giuseppe Parini and Domenico Balestrieri. Among its members were some of the key figures of the Milanese Enlightenment, including Cesare Beccaria, Clelia Grillo Borromeo, Maria Gaetana Agnesi and Pietro Verri. In 1761, Pietro Verri broke away with the Accademia, and went on to found the magazine Il Caffè and the Accademia dei Pugni (Academy of Fisticuffs) with his brother Alessandro.

Adopting a moderate stance, the Accademia dei Trasformati sought to reconcile new Enlightenment ideas with Renaissance tradition. Members met every Thursday and held two solemn public sessions each year to discuss recently published books and various contemporary issues. The academy was housed in the Palazzo Imbonati in Piazza San Fedele, the residence of Count Imbonati. After Imbonati's death on 2 July 1768, the academy became defunct.

== Bibliography ==
- Fagioli Vercellone, Guido Gregorio (2004). "IMBONATI, Giuseppe Maria". Dizionario Biografico degli Italiani (in Italian). Vol. 62: Iacobiti–Labriola. Rome: Institute of the Italian Encyclopaedia. ISBN 978-88-12-00032-6.
- Croce, Alessandro (2006). "Alessandro Verri". In Gaetana Marrone; Paolo Puppa (eds.). Encyclopedia of Italian Literary Studies. New York: Routledge. pp. 1977–79. ISBN 978-1135455293.
- Zaggia, Massimo (2014). "Culture in Lombardy, 1535–1706". A Companion to Late Medieval and Early Modern Milan. Leiden: Brill. pp. 190–213. doi:10.1163/9789004284128_010. ISBN 978-9004284128.
