= Giuseppe Parini =

Italian poet (1729–1799)

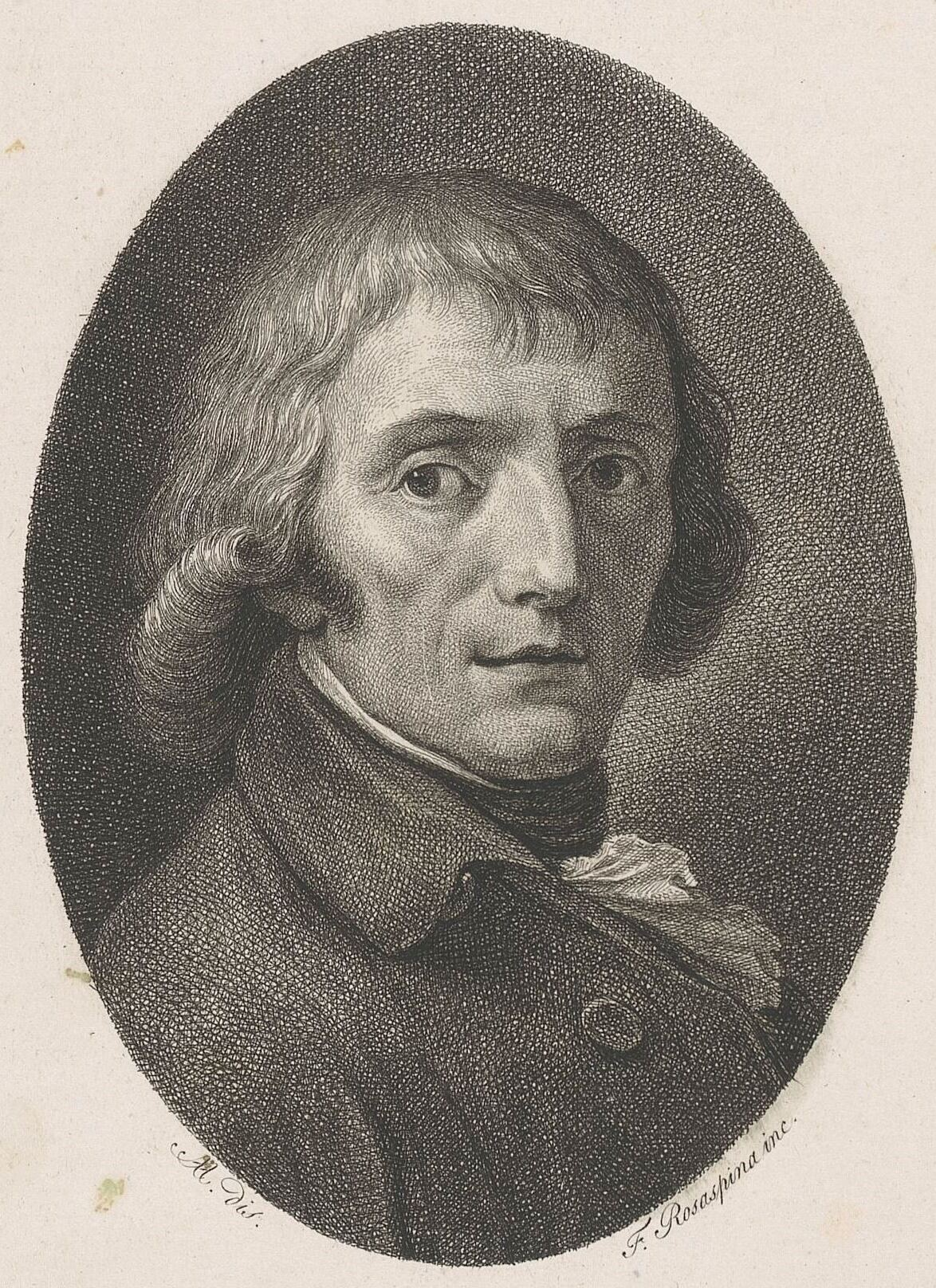
- Giuseppe Parini, in a lithograph by Rosaspina.
- Born: 23 May 1729; Bosisio Parini, Italy
- Died: 15 August 1799 (aged 70); Milan, Italy
- Occupations: Catholic priest; Satirist; Poet
- Writing career
- Language: Italian; Milanese dialect
- Period: 18th century; Age of Enlightenment
- Genres: Poetry; pamphlet; treatise
- Notable works: Il Giorno; Odi
- Movement: Neoclassicism

Giuseppe Parini (23 May 1729 – 15 August 1799) was an Italian satirist and Neoclassical poet.

== Biography ==
Parini (originally spelled Parino) was born in Bosisio (later renamed Bosisio Parini in his honour) in Brianza, Lombardy from a poor family. His father, who was a petty silk trader, sent him to Milan under the care of his great-aunt: there he studied under the Barnabites in the Arcimboldi Academy, while earning a living by copying manuscripts. In 1741, his great-aunt left him a monthly payment, on condition that he enter the priesthood. Parini was thus ordained, although his religious studies were not profitable because of his need to work in a lawyer's office during his free time and his intolerance of the old-fashioned teaching methods used.

In 1752, he published at Lugano, under the pseudonym of "Ripano Eupilino", a small volume of selected poems, Alcune poesie, which secured his election to the Accademia dei Trasformati at Milan, as well as to the Accademia dell'Arcadia at Rome. His poem, Il Giorno (The Day), consisting of ironic instructions to a young nobleman as to the best method of spending his days, which was to be published in three parts, marked a distinct advance in Italian blank verse. The first part, Il Mattino (Morning), was published in 1763 and at once established Parini's popularity and influence, and two years later a continuation (the second part) was published under the title of Il Mezzogiorno (Midday).

Only the first two parts were published during his lifetime. An eternal perfectionist, he was unable to complete Il vespro (Evening) and La notte (Night). The protagonist is a “Young Lord,” who has nothing better to do than to fill the void of his existence with frivolous pastimes; he is flanked by a preceptor, a sort of ironic narrative conscience, who is no more than a mask for the author. The young lord is a ladies' man who projects the image of an aristocracy entirely occupied with its worldly pleasures, thinking of nothing but itself, and offering ritual sacrifice to those two deadly genii, ennui and punctiliousness in defending noble honor. Pope's Rape of the Lock influences the form, as his Essay on Man does the content; other influences include the Télémaque of Fénelon, especially as regards the polemic against riches and luxury and the corresponding praise of agriculture and the laborious healthy life of the peasantry. Il Vespro and La Notte were published, both unfinished, after his death, which along with two other previous parts form what is collectively titled Il Giorno. Parini's Odi, composed between 1757 and 1795, have appeared in various editions.

The Austrian plenipotentiary in Milan, Count Karl Joseph von Firmian, saw to the poet's advancement, first by appointing him editor of the Milan Gazette, and then in 1769 to a specially created chair of belles lettres in the Palatine School.

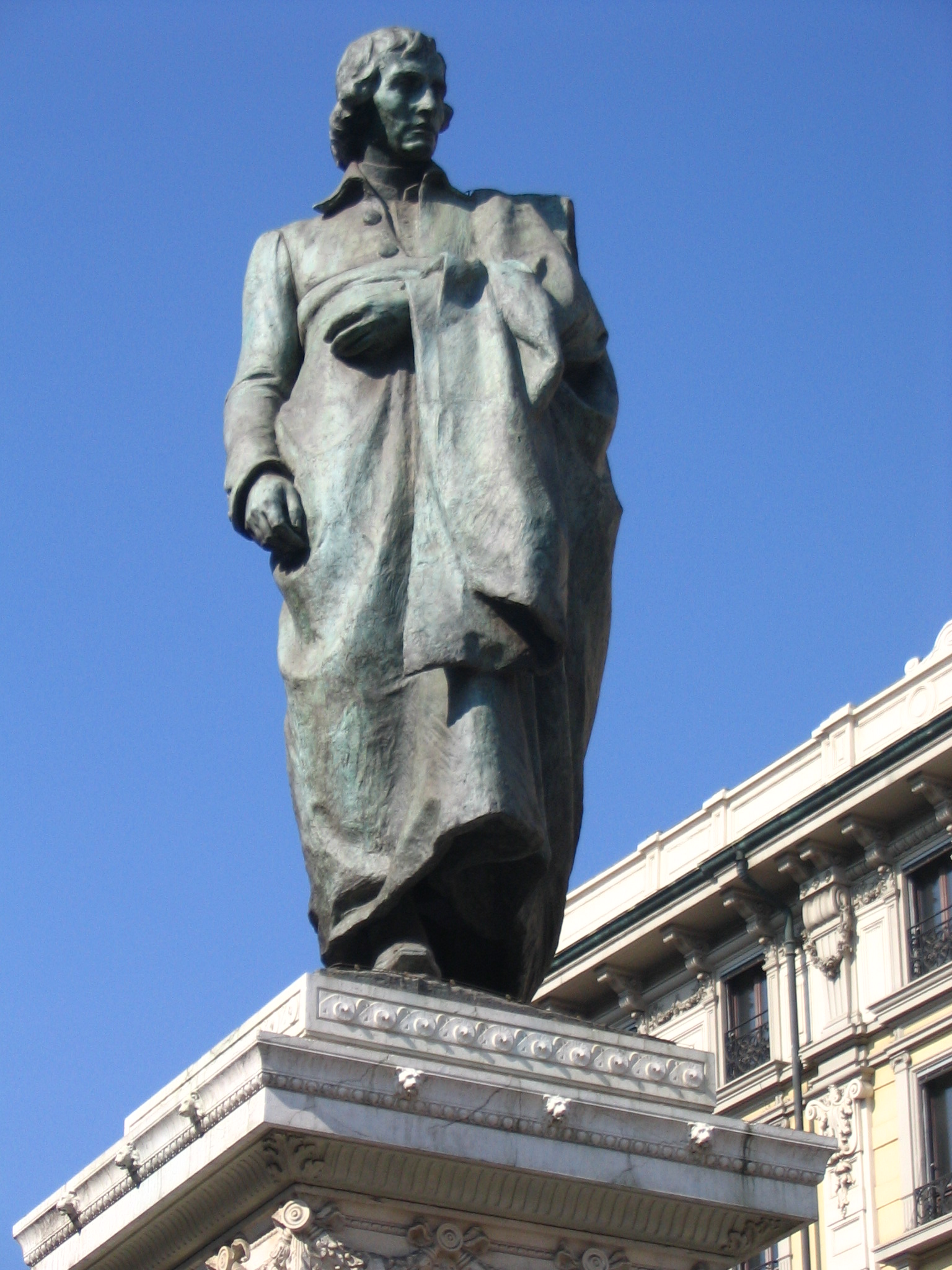
Monument to Parini in the Piazza Cordusio, Milan (Luca Beltrami)

In 1787, Parini was nominated superintendent of schools. In 1771, he had composed the libretto of Mozart's Ascanio in Alba, written to celebrate the wedding of the Austrian Archduke Ferdinand, and in 1777 he had been elected a fellow of Rome's Accademia dell'Arcadia. In 1791, he published the first edition of the Odi, which in addition to the earlier poems also contained occasional compositions, such as ‘In morte del Maestro Sacchini’; others reflected his more comfortable lifestyle, and his frank appreciation of female beauty. Following the French invasion of May 1796, Parini participated in the Municipalité set up by the revolutionary forces, but by July withdrew, condemning the Directoire for its staunch anti-clericalism, for indifference to the wellbeing of Lombardy, and for predatory attitudes to what had become a French colony. A year later the Austrians re-entered the city, just before Parini's death on 15 August. A statue of the poet occupies a place of honour in Milan's busy Piazzale Cordusio. His family still survives, with Katrine Cereda-Parini being the youngest known relative to continue the name to this day.

Parini was more sympathetic with the philosophes of the first half of the century than those of the second half (Voltaire, Rousseau), whom he qualifies as “new sophists.” His role as a moralist of happiness conforms totally to the ideology of enlightened Lombard reformism, the protagonists of which were the ministers and functionaries of the Austrian government. Parini's work was accepted by younger poets mainly as a lesson in morality and freedom of thought. Ugo Foscolo, who met Parini in Milan, portrayed him as a serious, dignified person in Ultime lettere di Jacopo Ortis and criticized the rich and corrupt town which had forgotten him, in Dei Sepolcri.

== Libretto ==
Ascanio in Alba, music by Wolfgang Amadeus Mozart (1771)

== Publications ==
- Giuseppe Parini (trans. Herbert Morris Bower). The Day Morning, Midday, Evening, Night : a Poem. Westport, Conn: Hyperion Press, 1978. ISBN 0-88355-592-1
