= List of municipalities of the Metropolitan City of Milan =

The following is a list of the 133 municipalities (comuni) of the Metropolitan City of Milan (formerly the Province of Milan) in the region of Lombardy in Italy.

== List ==
Municipality	Population (2026)	Area (km²)	Density
Abbiategrasso	32,793	47.78	686.3
Albairate	4,719	14.98	315.0
Arconate	6,871	8.42	816.0
Arese	19,545	6.56	2,979.4
Arluno	12,615	12.36	1,020.6
Assago	9,348	8.05	1,161.2
Baranzate	12,129	2.78	4,362.9
Bareggio	17,271	11.38	1,517.7
Basiano	3,645	4.59	794.1
Basiglio	8,027	8.49	945.5
Bellinzago Lombardo	3,728	4.59	812.2
Bernate Ticino	2,919	12.16	240.0
Besate	2,050	12.74	160.9
Binasco	7,068	3.87	1,826.4
Boffalora sopra Ticino	4,104	7.65	536.5
Bollate	36,754	13.12	2,801.4
Bresso	26,672	3.38	7,891.1
Bubbiano	2,446	2.95	829.2
Buccinasco	26,345	12.00	2,195.4
Buscate	4,696	7.83	599.7
Bussero	8,386	4.59	1,827.0
Busto Garolfo	14,131	12.99	1,087.8
Calvignasco	1,201	1.73	694.2
Cambiago	7,331	7.18	1,021.0
Canegrate	12,889	5.25	2,455.0
Carpiano	4,119	17.24	238.9
Carugate	15,763	5.39	2,924.5
Casarile	3,929	7.33	536.0
Casorezzo	5,721	6.60	866.8
Cassano d'Adda	19,980	18.60	1,074.2
Cassina de' Pecchi	13,955	7.21	1,935.5
Cassinetta di Lugagnano	1,967	3.32	592.5
Castano Primo	10,931	19.17	570.2
Cernusco sul Naviglio	34,840	13.22	2,635.4
Cerro al Lambro	5,211	9.96	523.2
Cerro Maggiore	15,192	10.12	1,501.2
Cesano Boscone	23,285	3.94	5,909.9
Cesate	14,364	5.77	2,489.4
Cinisello Balsamo	75,154	12.72	5,908.3
Cisliano	5,200	14.68	354.2
Cologno Monzese	47,179	8.40	5,616.5
Colturano	2,056	4.16	494.2
Corbetta	19,156	18.69	1,024.9
Cormano	21,036	4.47	4,706.0
Cornaredo	20,746	11.07	1,874.1
Corsico	34,811	5.36	6,494.6
Cuggiono	8,198	14.93	549.1
Cusago	4,869	11.46	424.9
Cusano Milanino	18,994	3.08	6,166.9
Dairago	6,346	5.64	1,125.2
Dresano	3,054	3.48	877.6
Gaggiano	9,543	26.26	363.4
Garbagnate Milanese	27,064	9.00	3,007.1
Gessate	9,137	7.76	1,177.4
Gorgonzola	21,448	10.58	2,027.2
Grezzago	3,176	2.46	1,291.1
Gudo Visconti	1,608	6.10	263.6
Inveruno	8,568	12.14	705.8
Inzago	11,465	12.21	939.0
Lacchiarella	9,131	24.04	379.8
Lainate	26,457	12.93	2,046.2
Legnano	60,980	17.68	3,449.1
Liscate	3,931	9.41	417.7
Locate di Triulzi	10,360	12.61	821.6
Magenta	25,066	21.99	1,139.9
Magnago	9,547	11.23	850.1
Marcallo con Casone	6,403	8.21	779.9
Masate	3,917	4.39	892.3
Mediglia	12,373	21.96	563.4
Melegnano	18,169	5.00	3,633.8
Melzo	18,540	9.82	1,888.0
Mesero	4,134	5.64	733.0
Milan	1,362,863	181.67	7,501.9
Morimondo	1,005	26.00	38.7
Motta Visconti	8,253	10.51	785.3
Nerviano	17,071	13.26	1,287.4
Nosate	638	4.88	130.7
Novate Milanese	20,415	5.46	3,739.0
Noviglio	4,534	15.86	285.9
Opera	14,463	7.64	1,893.1
Ossona	4,440	5.98	742.5
Ozzero	1,349	10.97	123.0
Paderno Dugnano	47,938	14.11	3,397.4
Pantigliate	5,886	5.69	1,034.4
Parabiago	28,398	14.29	1,987.3
Paullo	11,136	8.82	1,262.6
Pero	11,866	4.98	2,382.7
Peschiera Borromeo	24,363	23.22	1,049.2
Pessano con Bornago	9,034	6.66	1,356.5
Pieve Emanuele	15,846	12.91	1,227.4
Pioltello	37,709	13.09	2,880.7
Pogliano Milanese	8,483	4.78	1,774.7
Pozzo d'Adda	6,871	4.16	1,651.7
Pozzuolo Martesana	8,828	12.14	727.2
Pregnana Milanese	7,331	5.07	1,446.0
Rescaldina	14,406	8.03	1,794.0
Rho	51,000	22.24	2,293.2
Robecchetto con Induno	4,797	13.93	344.4
Robecco sul Naviglio	6,794	19.79	343.3
Rodano	4,709	13.07	360.3
Rosate	5,641	18.68	302.0
Rozzano	41,724	12.24	3,408.8
San Colombano al Lambro	7,591	16.55	458.7
San Donato Milanese	32,210	12.88	2,500.8
San Giorgio su Legnano	6,868	2.17	3,165.0
San Giuliano Milanese	40,227	30.87	1,303.1
San Vittore Olona	8,450	3.49	2,421.2
San Zenone al Lambro	4,508	7.24	622.7
Santo Stefano Ticino	4,983	4.97	1,002.6
Sedriano	13,088	7.75	1,688.8
Segrate	37,194	17.49	2,126.6
Senago	21,754	8.60	2,529.5
Sesto San Giovanni	78,850	11.70	6,739.3
Settala	7,447	17.42	427.5
Settimo Milanese	20,002	10.72	1,865.9
Solaro	14,260	6.68	2,134.7
Trezzano Rosa	5,444	3.44	1,582.6
Trezzano sul Naviglio	21,875	10.77	2,031.1
Trezzo sull'Adda	12,442	13.05	953.4
Tribiano	3,931	7.00	561.6
Truccazzano	5,810	21.98	264.3
Turbigo	7,276	8.52	854.0
Vanzaghello	5,394	5.56	970.1
Vanzago	9,372	6.05	1,549.1
Vaprio d'Adda	9,723	7.15	1,359.9
Vermezzo	5,987	10.74	557.4
Vernate	3,436	14.65	234.5
Vignate	9,369	8.55	1,095.8
Villa Cortese	6,333	3.55	1,783.9
Vimodrone	16,933	4.74	3,572.4
Vittuone	9,312	6.13	1,519.1
Vizzolo Predabissi	3,852	5.65	681.8
Zibido San Giacomo	6,643	24.58	270.3

== See also ==
- List of municipalities of Lombardy
- List of municipalities of Italy
