= Parco Agricolo Sud Milano =

Protected rural area south and south-east of Milan, Italy

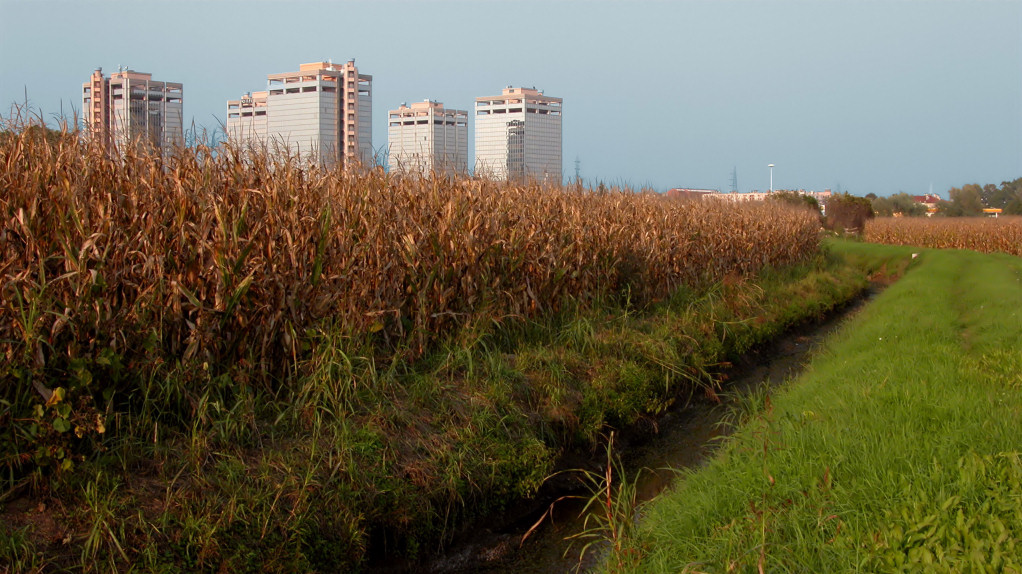
A view of the park showing rural areas near buildings from the outskirt of Milan

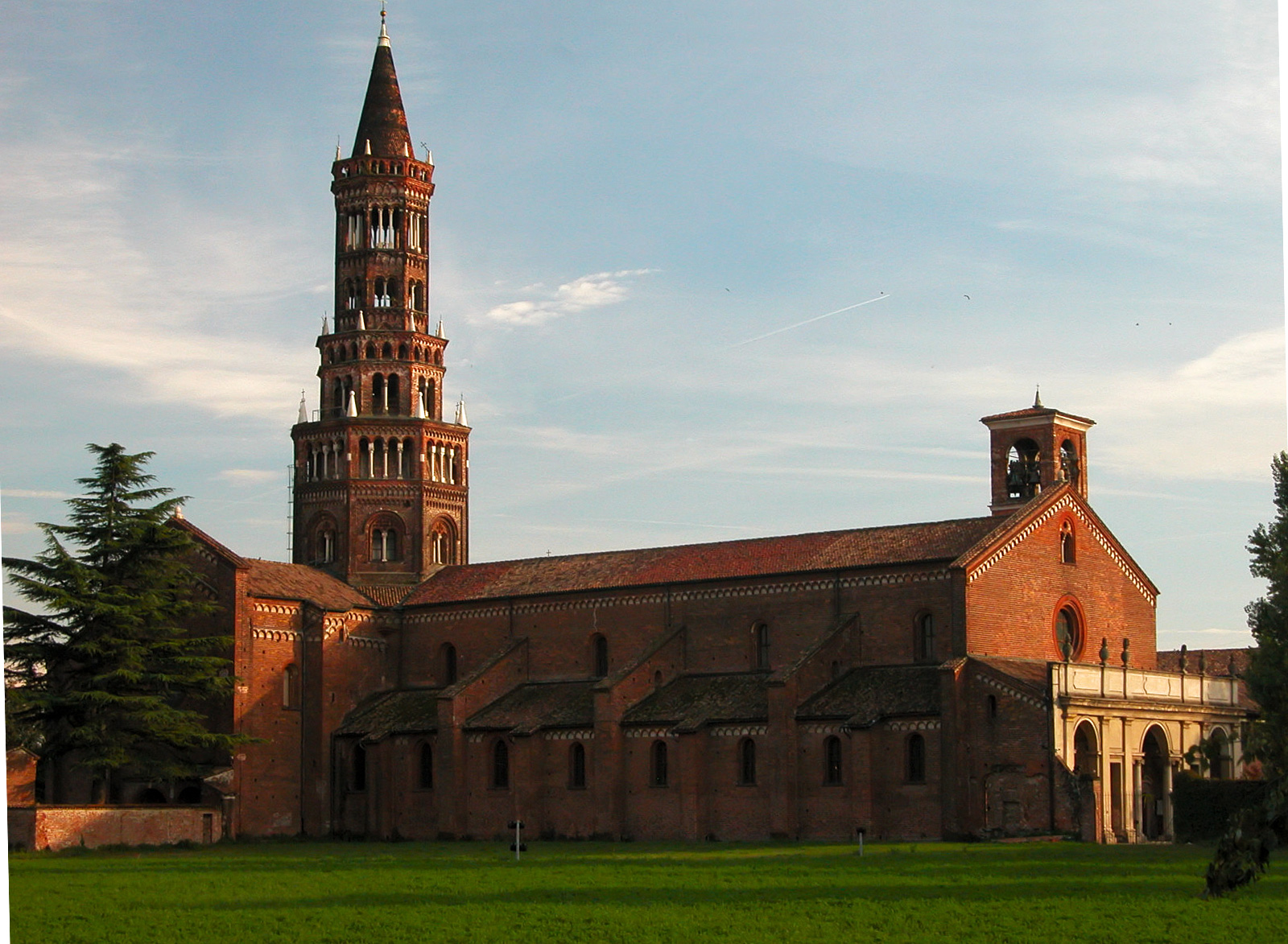
The Chiaravalle Abbey is the prominent historical monument within the park area

Parco Agricolo Sud Milano ("Rural Park South Milan") is a large protected rural area located south and south-east of Milan, Italy. The park was established in 1990 with the purpose of preserving, safeguarding, and enhancing the natural and historical heritage of the Po Valley. It is 47,000 hectares wide and shaped like a half-circle, located between Milan and the southern border of its Province. It also connects two other large protected natural areas: Ticino Park to the west and Adda Park to the east.

The park comprises different areas such as agricultural land proper, peripheral boroughs of Milan, a number of communes and cities of the Province of Milan, river basins (the two prominent rivers in the park being the Lambro and the Ticino), sparse woodlands, cascine (farms), local city parks (including Parco delle Cave, Boscoincittà, and Trenno Park), as well as historical monuments (like the Chiaravalle Abbey).

The park is directly managed by the Province of Milan.

== Municipalities ==
The territories of the following municipalities are completely or partially included in Parco Agricolo Sud Milano:

- Albairate
- Arluno
- Assago
- Bareggio
- Basiglio
- Binasco
- Bubbiano
- Buccinasco
- Calvignasco
- Carpiano
- Casarile
- Cassina de' Pecchi
- Cernusco sul Naviglio
- Cerro al Lambro
- Cesano Boscone
- Cisliano
- Colturano
- Corbetta
- Cornaredo
- Corsico
- Cusago
- Dresano
- Gaggiano
- Gorgonzola
- Gudo Visconti
- Lacchiarella
- Liscate
- Locate di Triulzi
- Mediglia
- Melegnano
- Melzo
- Milan
- Noviglio
- Opera
- Pantigliate
- Paullo
- Pero
- Peschiera Borromeo
- Pieve Emanuele
- Pioltello
- Pregnana Milanese
- Rho
- Rodano
- Rosate
- Rozzano
- San Donato Milanese
- San Giuliano Milanese
- Sedriano
- Segrate
- Settala
- Settimo Milanese
- Trezzano sul Naviglio
- Tribiano
- Vanzago
- Vermezzo
- Vernate
- Vignate
- Vittuone
- Vizzolo Predabissi
- Zelo Surrigone
- Zibido San Giacomo
