= Metropolitan City of Milan =

Metropolitan city of Italy, located in the Lombardy region

Coordinates: 45.4642°N 9.1903°E

Metropolitan City of Milan Città metropolitana di Milano (Italian) Cittaa metropolitana de Milan (Milanese)
- Metropolitan City
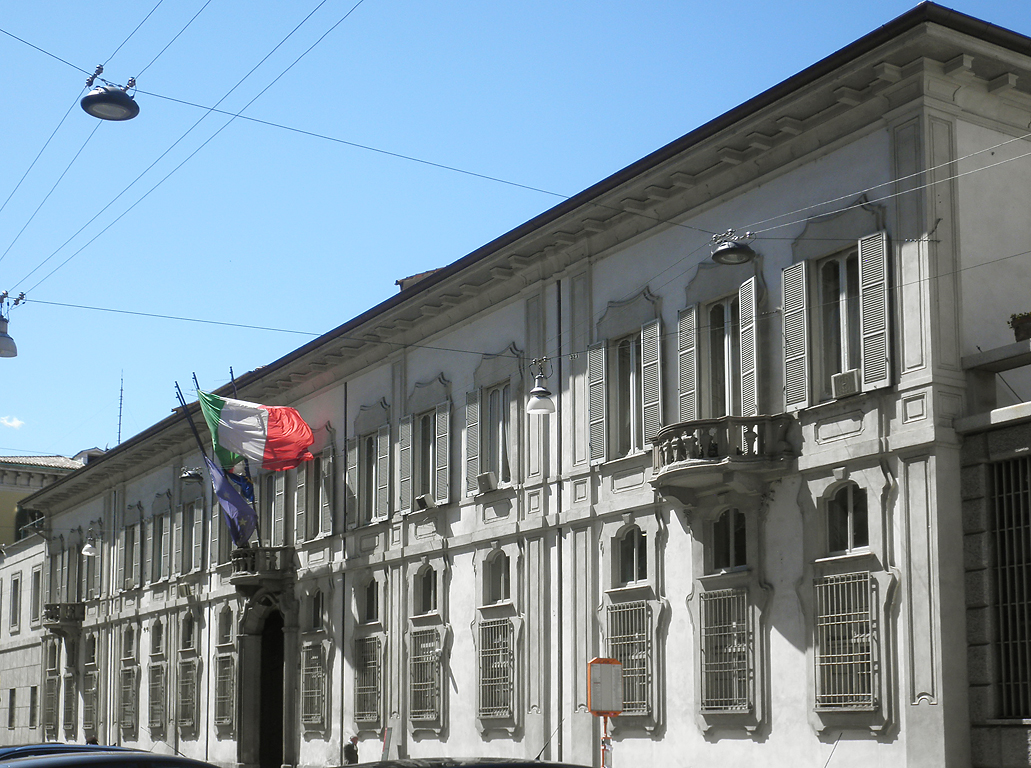
- Palazzo Isimbardi is the seat of the Metropolitan Council.

- Flag Coat of arms

- Location of the Metropolitan City of Milan in Italy
- Country: Italy
- Region: Lombardy
- Established: 1 January 2015
- Capital: Milan
- Municipalities: 133

Government
  - Metropolitan mayor: Giuseppe Sala

Area
  - Total: 1,575.65 km^{2} (608.36 sq mi)

Population (2026)
  - Total: 3,253,111
  - Density: 2,064.62/km^{2} (5,347.33/sq mi)

GDP
  - Metro: €228.436 billion (2021)
- Time zone: UTC+1 (CET)
  - Summer (DST): UTC+2 (CEST)
- Postal code: 20121-20162 (Milano), 20001-20099 (other municipalities)
- ISO 3166 code: IT-MI
- Vehicle registration: MI
- ISTAT code: 215
- Website: Metropolitan City of Milan

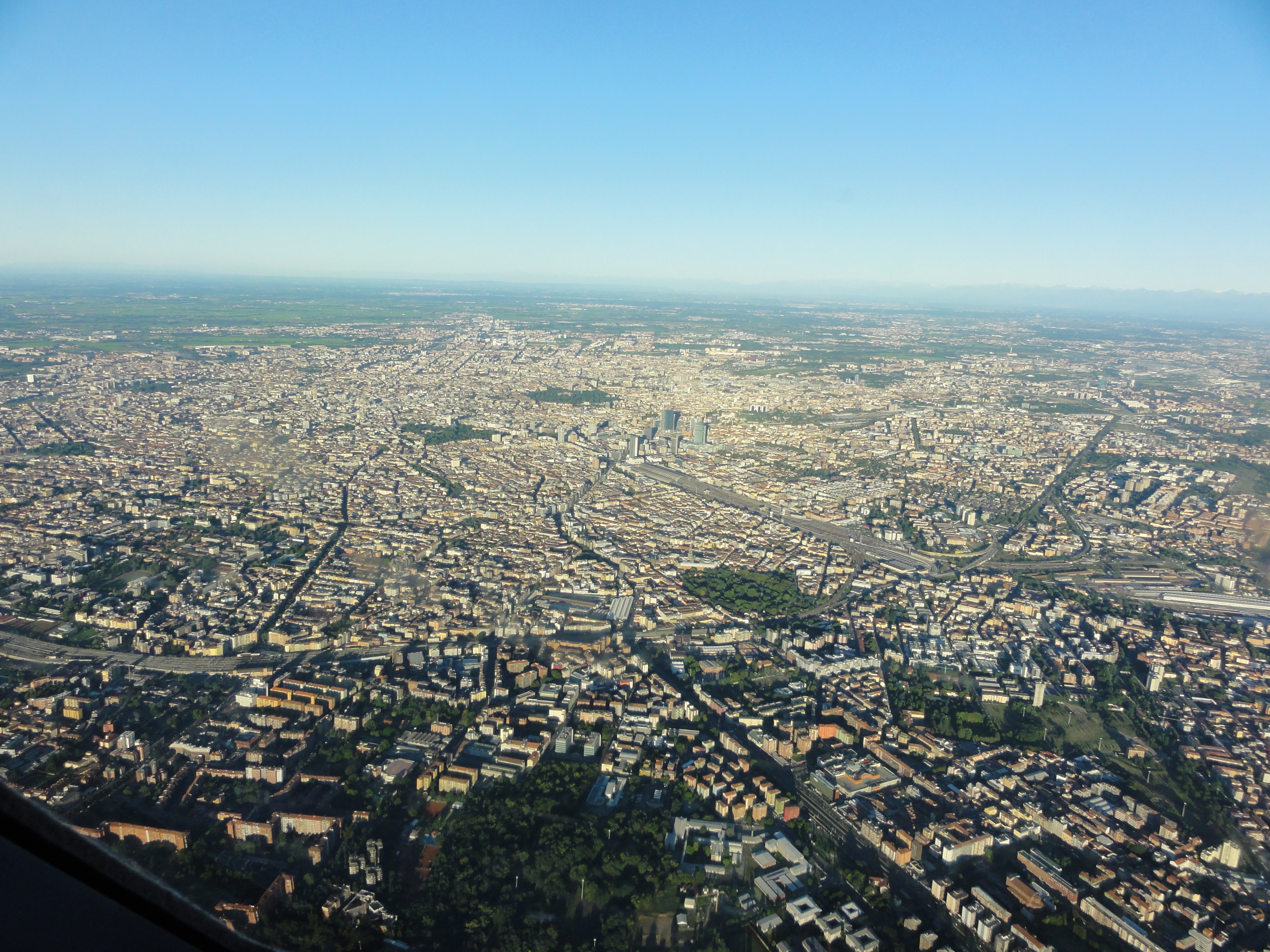
Aerial view of the Milan metropolitan area

The Metropolitan City of Milan (Italian: città metropolitana di Milano; Milanese: cittaa metropolitana de Milan, Lombard: [tʃiˈtaː metrupuliˈtana de miˈlãː]) is a metropolitan city (not to be confused with the metropolitan area) in the region of Lombardy in Italy. Its capital is the city of Milan.

With a population of 3,253,111, it is the second most populous metropolitan city in the nation after the Metropolitan City of Rome Capital. It replaced the province of Milan and includes the city of Milan and 132 other municipalities. It was first created by the reform of local authorities (Law 142/1990) and then established by the Law 56/2014. It has been operative since 1 January 2015.

The Metropolitan City of Milan is headed by the Metropolitan Mayor (sindaco metropolitano) and by the Metropolitan Council (consiglio metropolitano). Since June 2016 Giuseppe Sala, as mayor of the capital city, has been the mayor of the Metropolitan City.

== Government ==
=== Metropolitan Council ===
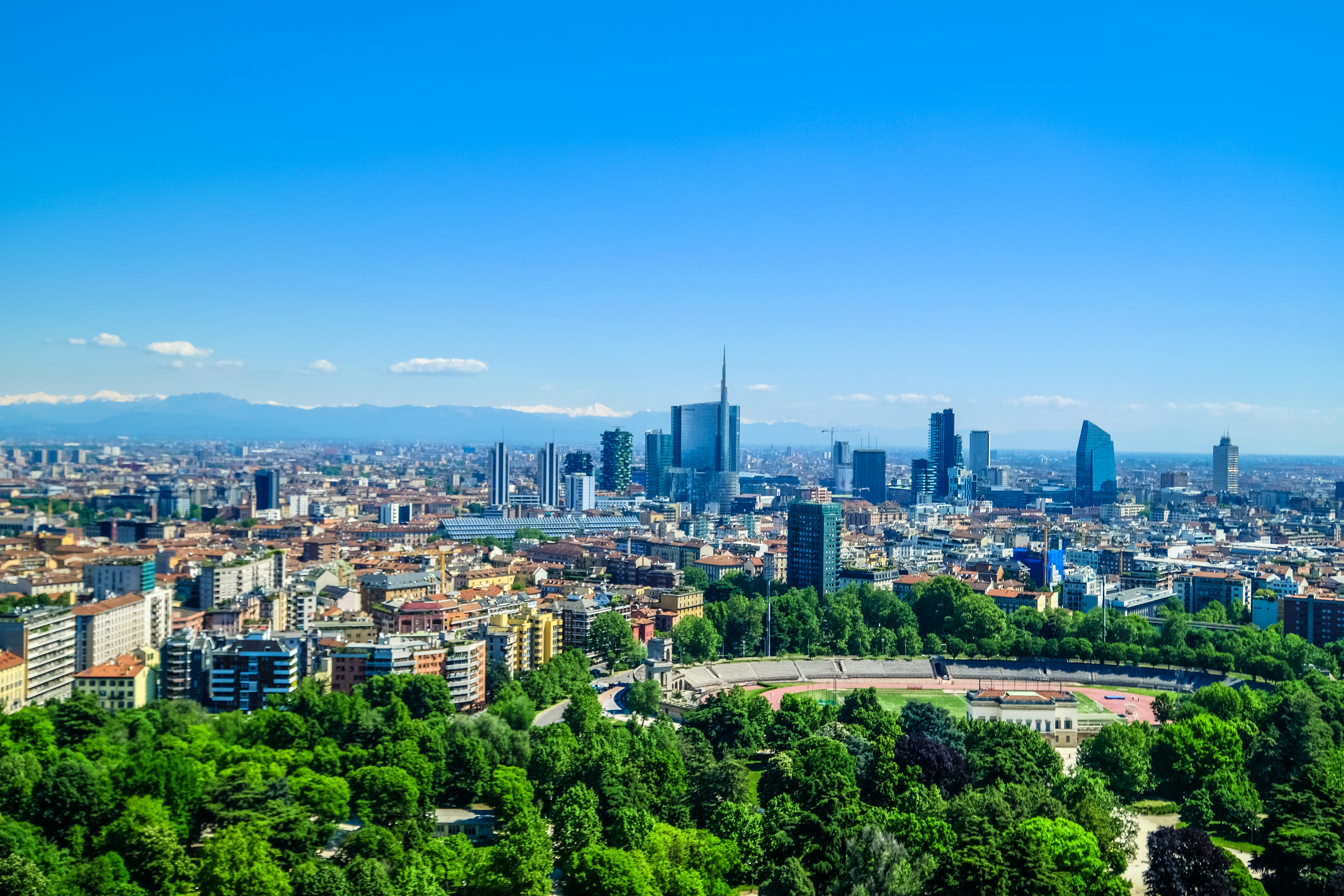
Milan is the economic capital of Italy, and is a global financial centre and a fashion capital of the world

The new Metro municipalities, giving large urban areas the administrative powers of a province, are conceived for improving the performance of local administrations and to slash local spending by better coordinating the municipalities in providing basic services (including transport, school and social programs) and environment protection. In this policy framework, the Mayor of Milan is designated to exercise the functions of Metropolitan mayor, presiding over a Metropolitan Council. The Council consists of mayors and city councillors of each comune in the Metropolitan City elected from amongst themselves using partially open list proportional representation, with seats allocated using the D'Hondt method. Metropolitan councillors are elected at-large for five-year terms; votes for metropolitan councillors are weighted by grouping comunes of a certain population range into nine groups so that votes of the mayors and city councillors of the more populous groups are worth than those of less populous groups.

The first Metropolitan Council of the City was elected on 28 September 2014. The current Metropolitan Council of the City (2021–2026) was elected on 19 December 2021:

Party	Individual votes	%	Electoral votes	%	Seats
PD	648	43.14%	41,096	49.31%	13 / 24
FI	309	20.57%	13,729	16.47%	4 / 24
LN	246	16.38%	13,446	16.13%	4 / 24
FdI	181	12.05%	8,983	10.78%	2 / 24
AVS	102	6.79%	6,091	7.31%	1 / 24

The Metropolitan Council is seated at Palazzo Isimbardi, located in Milan.

=== List of metropolitan mayors ===
	Metropolitan Mayor	Term start	Term end	Party
1	Giuliano Pisapia	1 January 2015	21 June 2016	Ind
2	Giuseppe Sala	21 June 2016	Incumbent	Ind

=== Municipalities ===
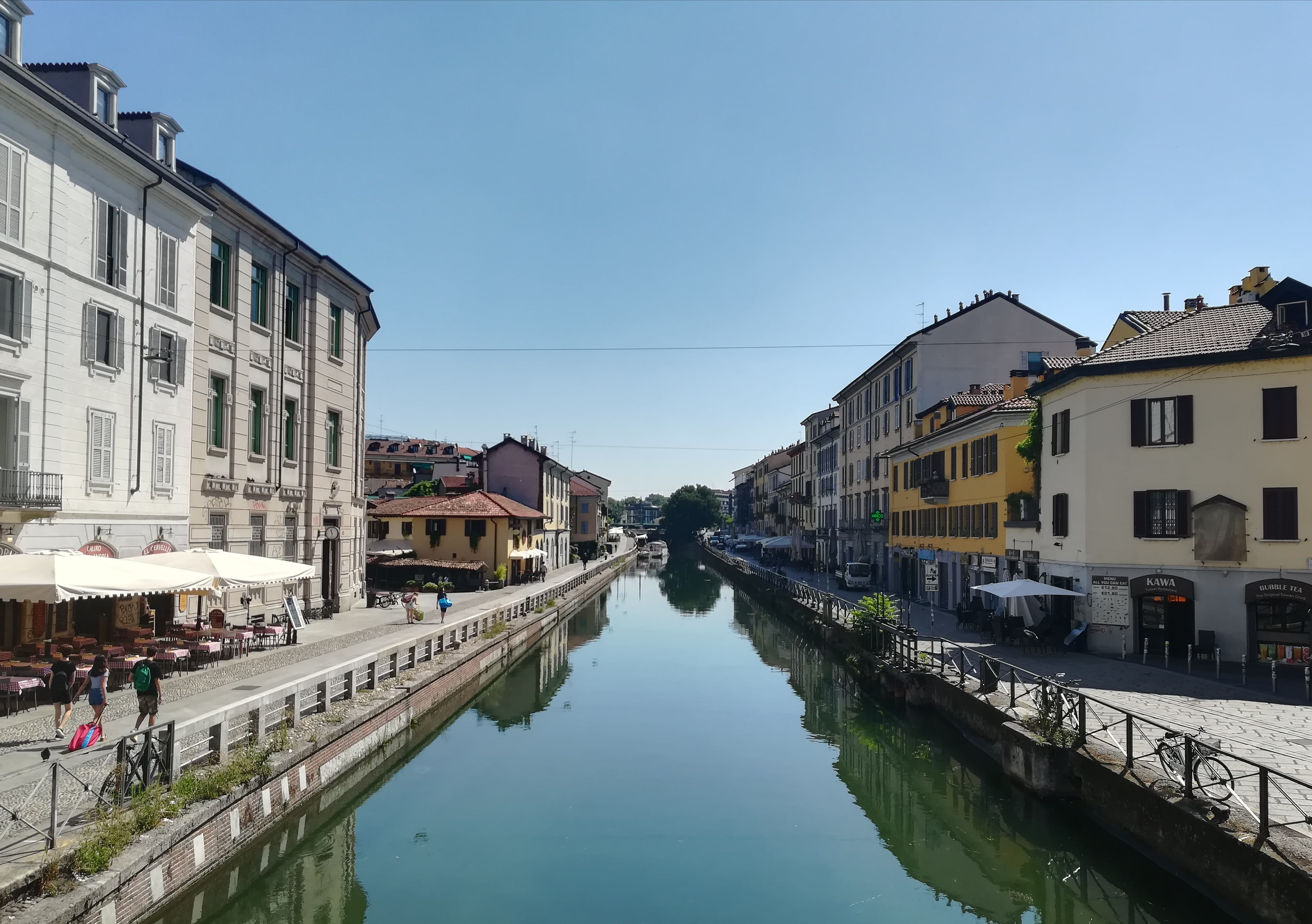
Naviglio Grande In Milan

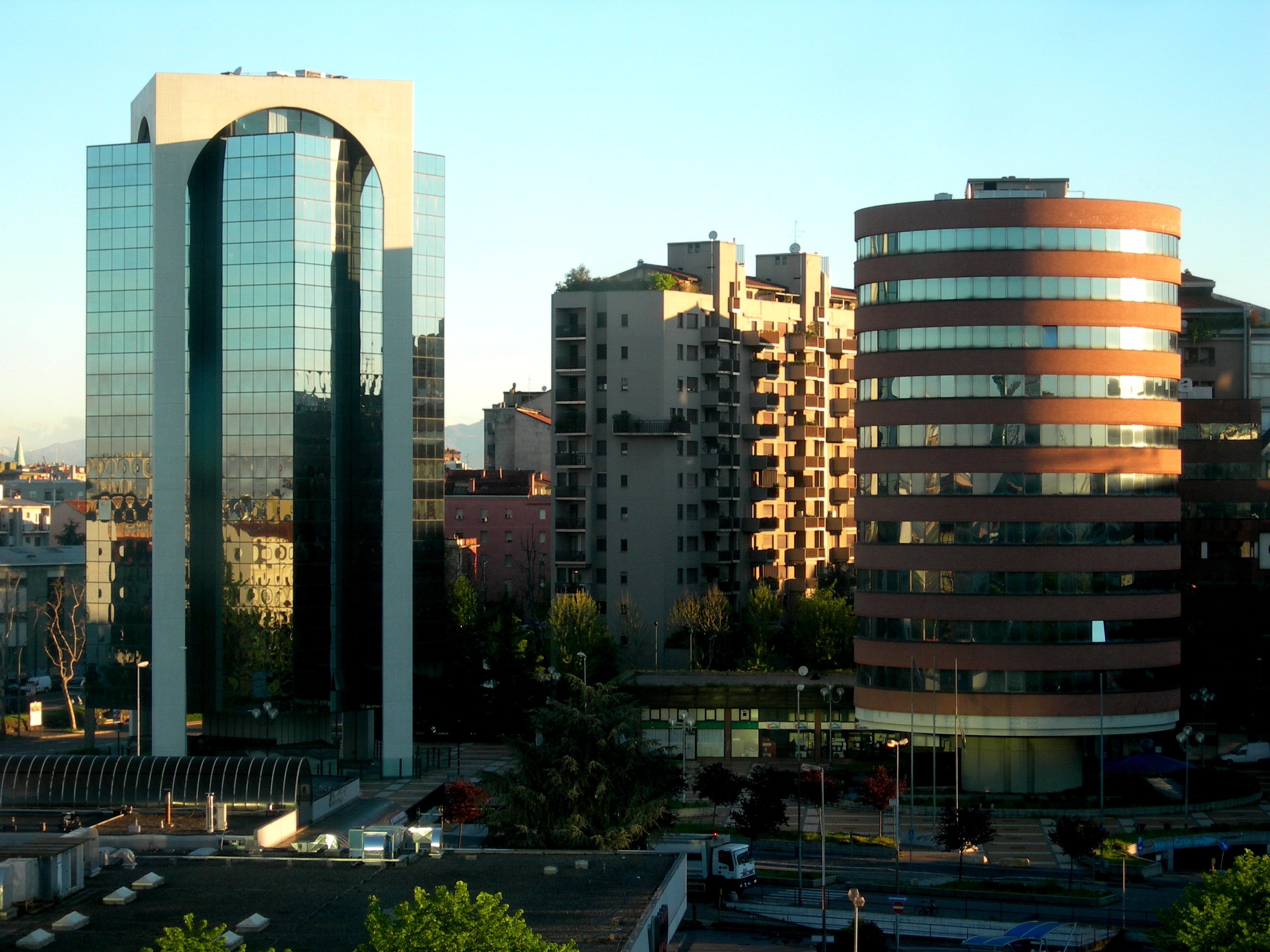
Sesto San Giovanni

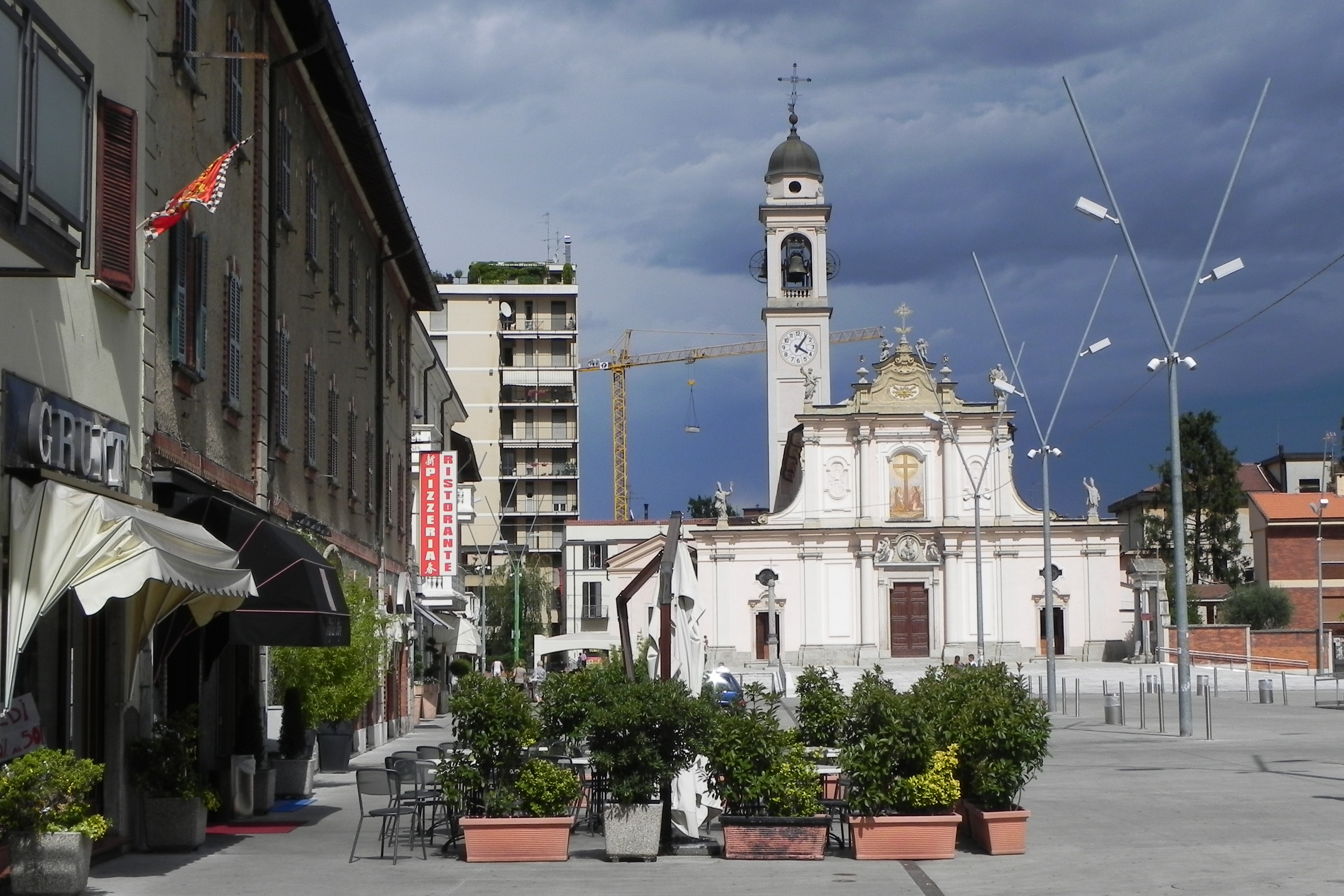
Cinisello Balsamo

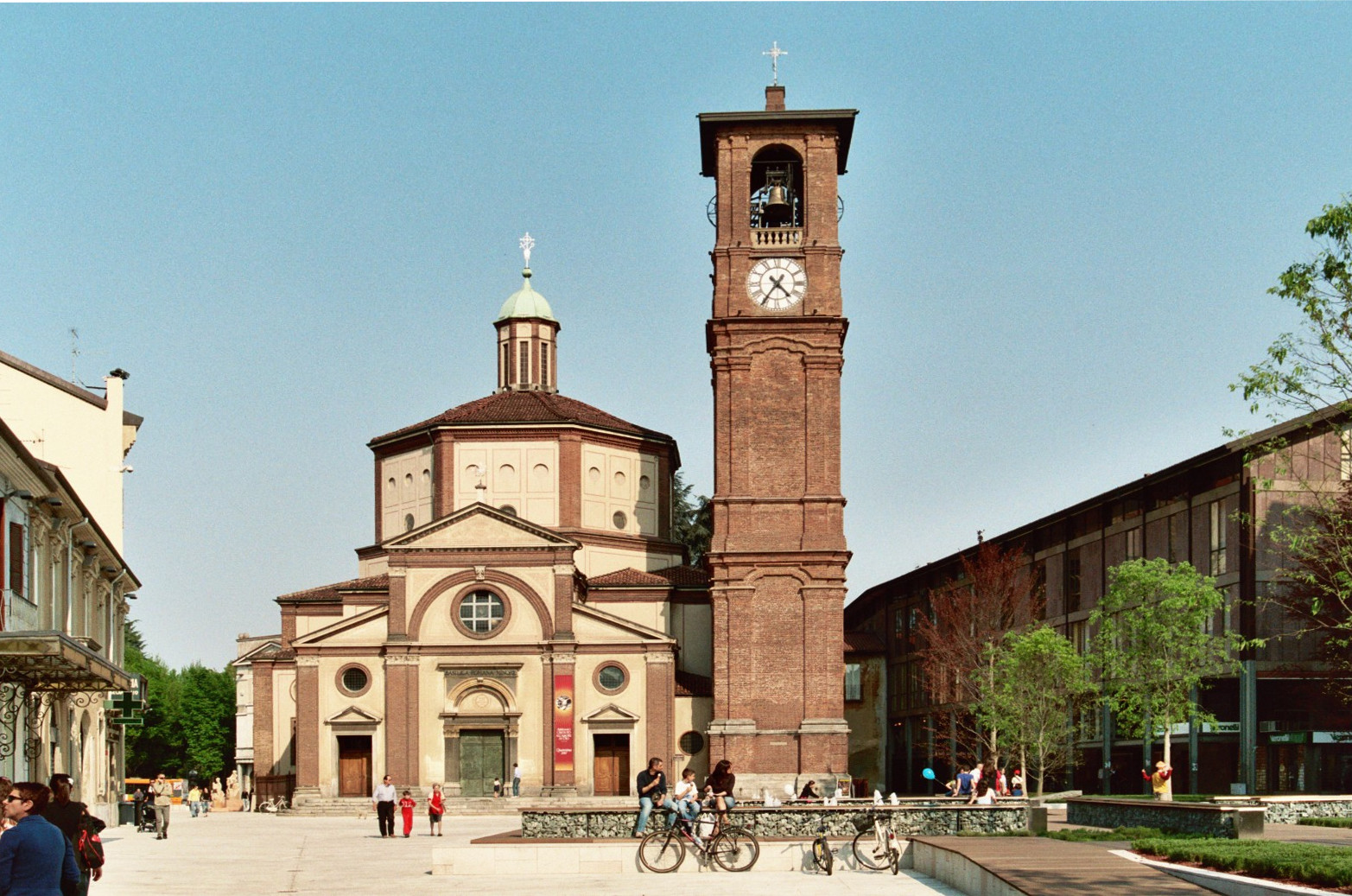
Legnano

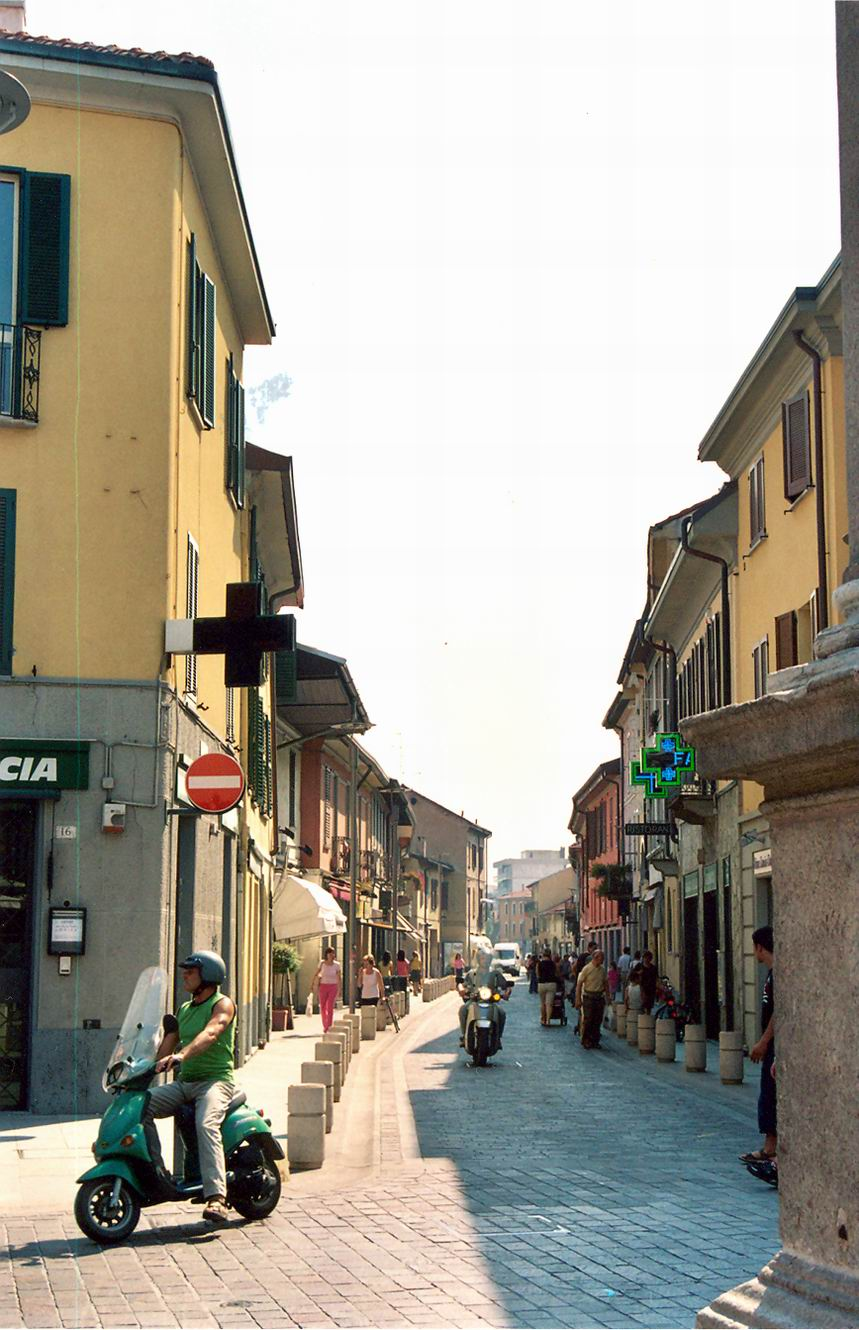
Rho

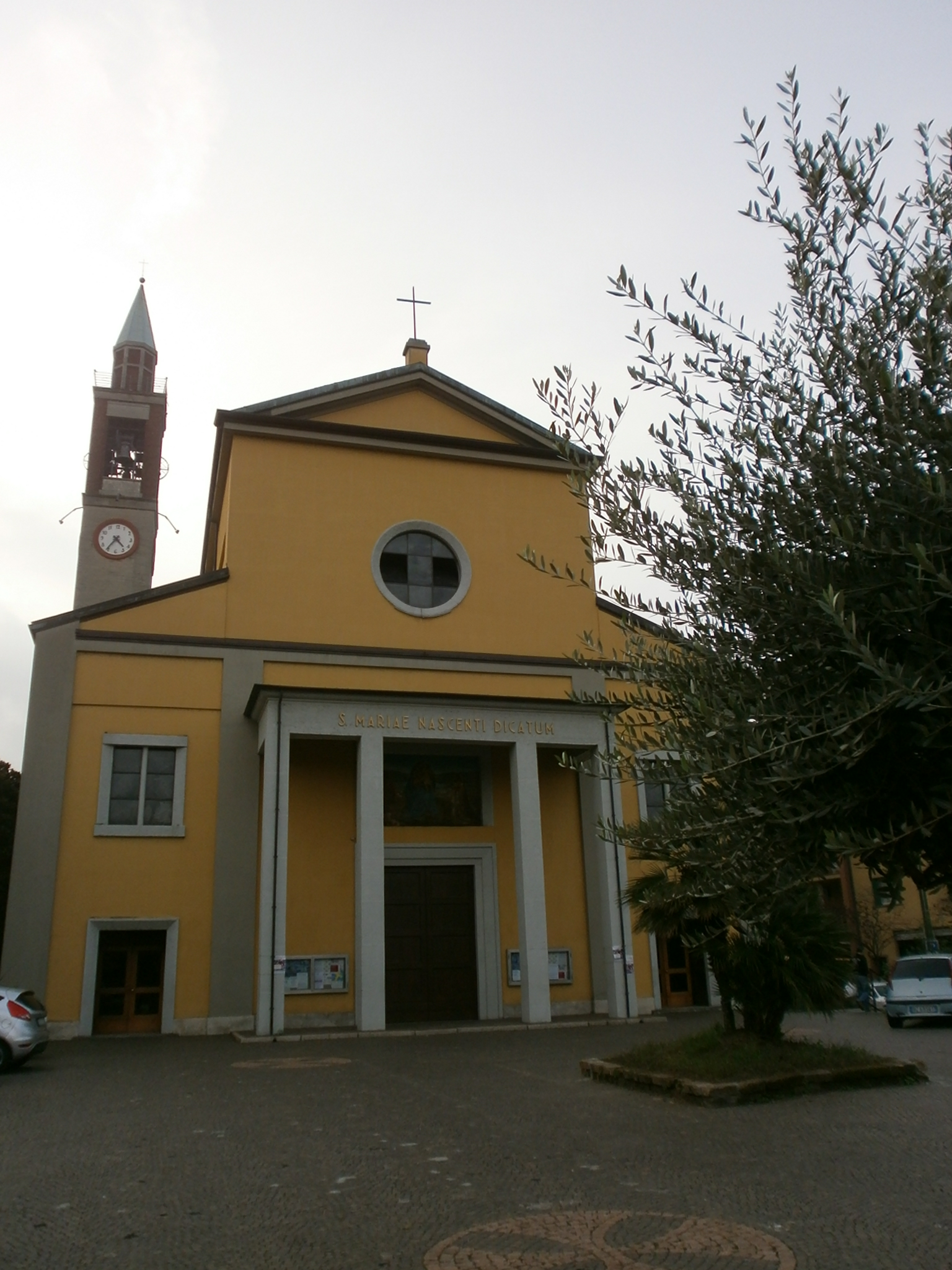
Paderno Dugnano

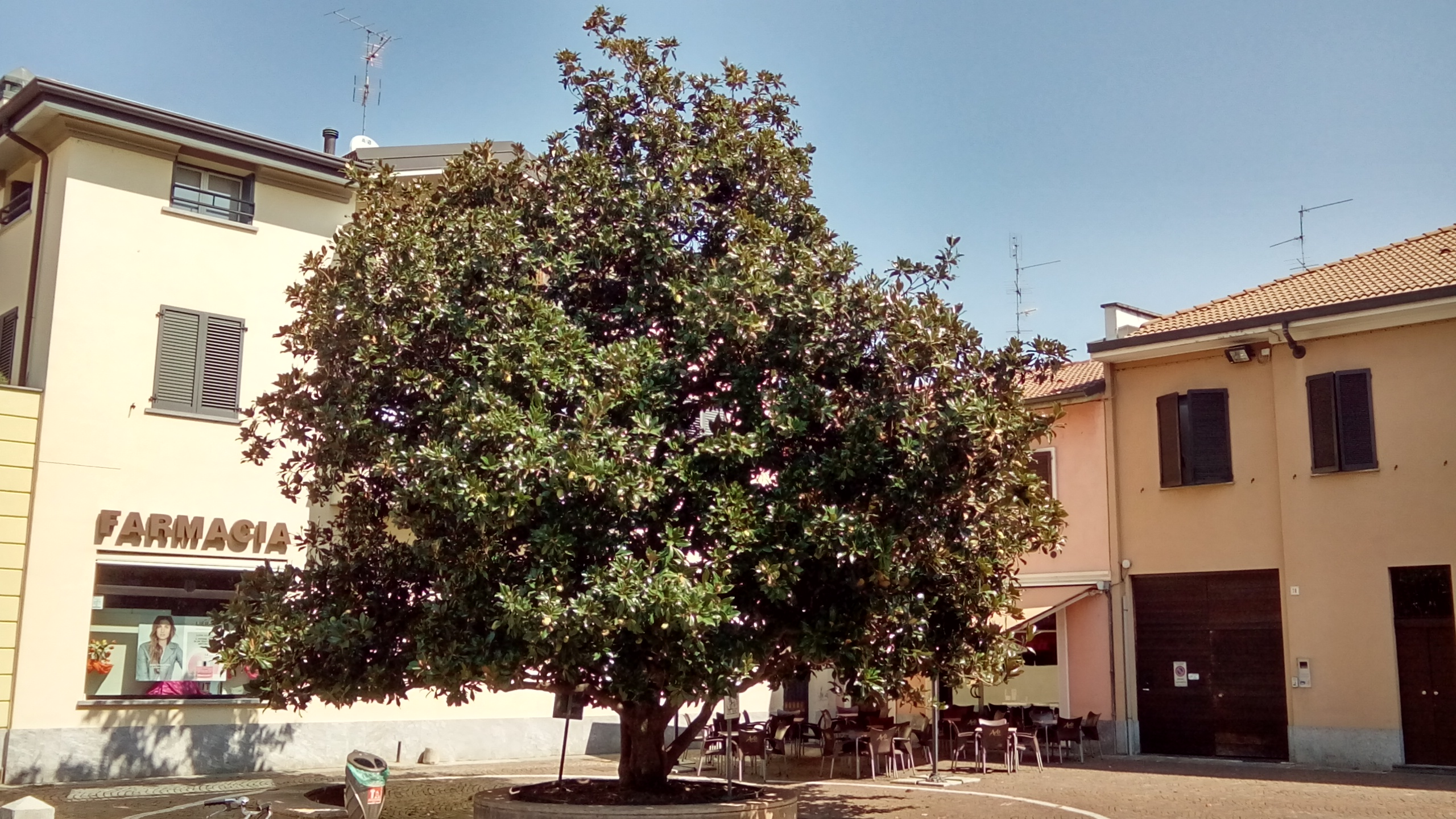
Cernusco sul Naviglio

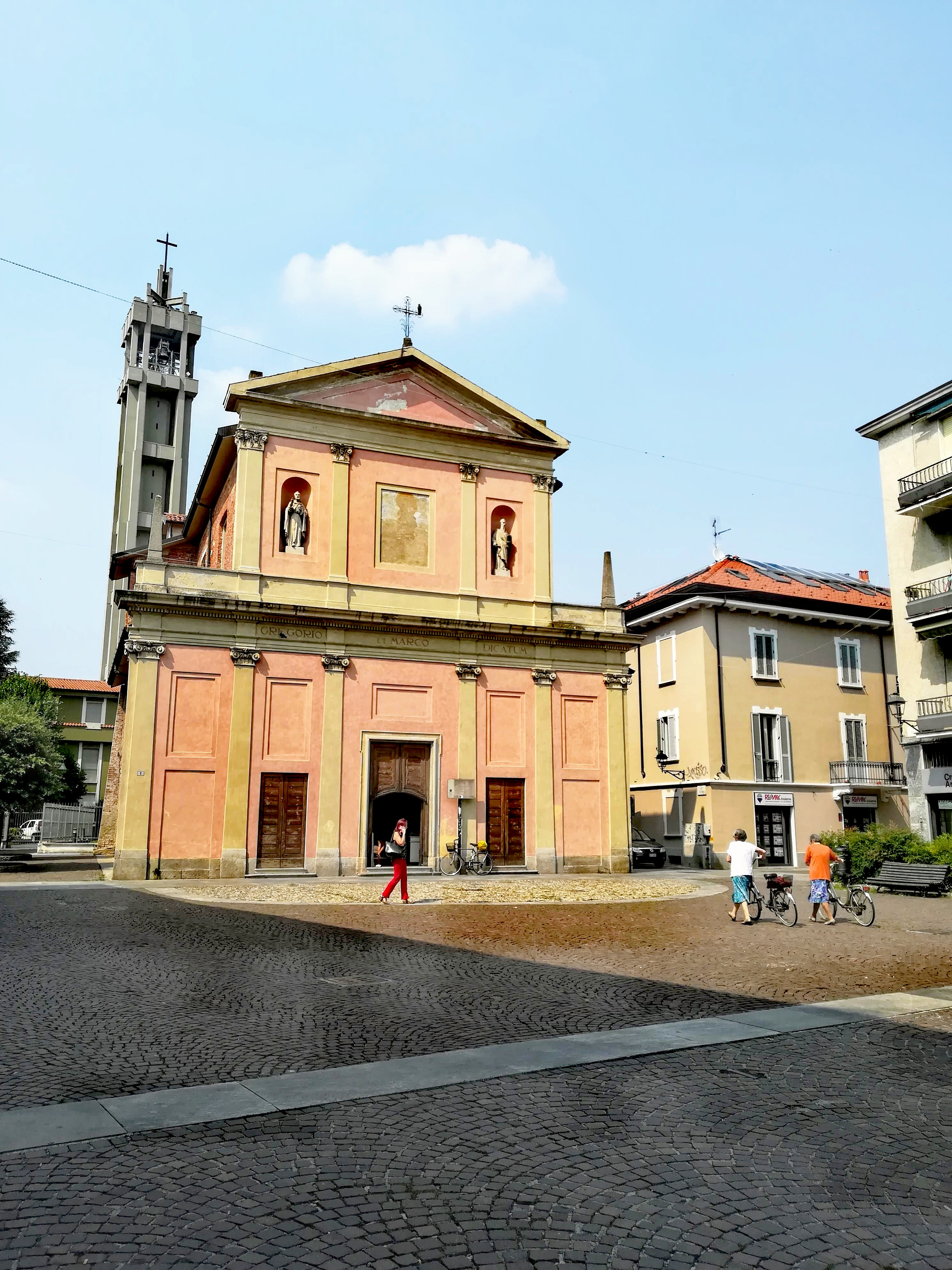
Cologno Monzese

The metropolitan city has 133 municipalities:

- Abbiategrasso
- Albairate
- Arconate
- Arese
- Arluno
- Assago
- Baranzate
- Bareggio
- Basiano
- Basiglio
- Bellinzago Lombardo
- Bernate Ticino
- Besate
- Binasco
- Boffalora sopra Ticino
- Bollate
- Bresso
- Bubbiano
- Buccinasco
- Buscate
- Bussero
- Busto Garolfo
- Calvignasco
- Cambiago
- Canegrate
- Carpiano
- Carugate
- Casarile
- Casorezzo
- Cassano d'Adda
- Cassina de' Pecchi
- Cassinetta di Lugagnano
- Castano Primo
- Cernusco sul Naviglio
- Cerro al Lambro
- Cerro Maggiore
- Cesano Boscone
- Cesate
- Cinisello Balsamo
- Cisliano
- Cologno Monzese
- Colturano
- Corbetta
- Cormano
- Cornaredo
- Corsico
- Cuggiono
- Cusago
- Cusano Milanino
- Dairago
- Dresano
- Gaggiano
- Garbagnate Milanese
- Gessate
- Gorgonzola
- Grezzago
- Gudo Visconti
- Inveruno
- Inzago
- Lacchiarella
- Lainate
- Legnano
- Liscate
- Locate di Triulzi
- Magenta
- Magnago
- Marcallo con Casone
- Masate
- Mediglia
- Melegnano
- Melzo
- Mesero
- Milan
- Morimondo
- Motta Visconti
- Nerviano
- Nosate
- Novate Milanese
- Noviglio
- Opera
- Ossona
- Ozzero
- Paderno Dugnano
- Pantigliate
- Parabiago
- Paullo
- Pero
- Peschiera Borromeo
- Pessano con Bornago
- Pieve Emanuele
- Pioltello
- Pogliano Milanese
- Pozzo d'Adda
- Pozzuolo Martesana
- Pregnana Milanese
- Rescaldina
- Rho
- Robecchetto con Induno
- Robecco sul Naviglio
- Rodano
- Rosate
- Rozzano
- San Colombano al Lambro
- San Donato Milanese
- San Giorgio su Legnano
- San Giuliano Milanese
- San Vittore Olona
- San Zenone al Lambro
- Santo Stefano Ticino
- Sedriano
- Segrate
- Senago
- Sesto San Giovanni
- Settala
- Settimo Milanese
- Solaro
- Trezzano Rosa
- Trezzano sul Naviglio
- Trezzo sull'Adda
- Tribiano
- Truccazzano
- Turbigo
- Vanzaghello
- Vanzago
- Vaprio d'Adda
- Vermezzo
- Vernate
- Vignate
- Villa Cortese
- Vimodrone
- Vittuone
- Vizzolo Predabissi
- Zibido San Giacomo

=== Municipal government ===
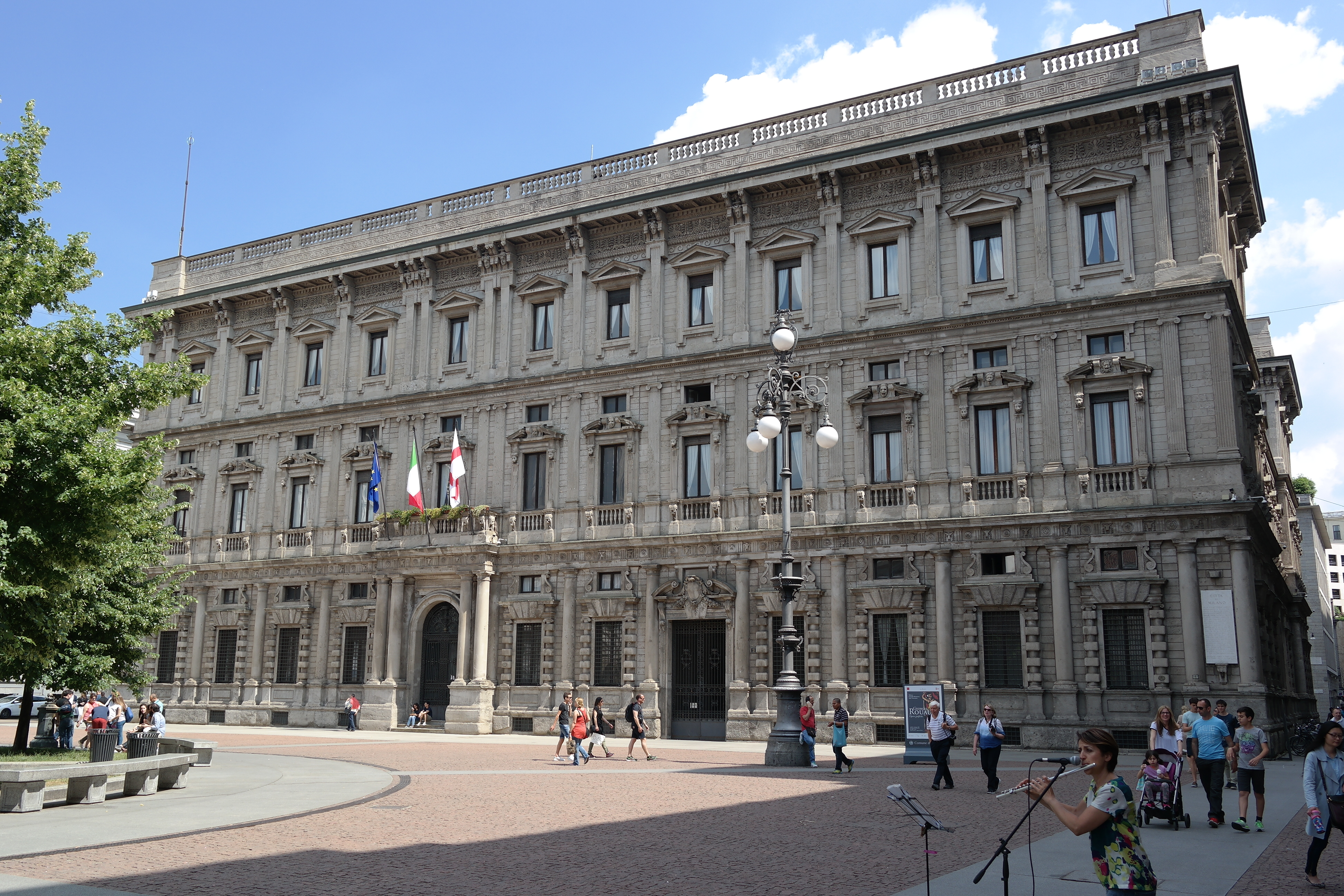
Palazzo Marino, Milan City Hall

Here is a list of the municipal government in cities and towns with more than 15,000 inhabitants:

Municipality	Mayor	Party	Executive	Term
Milan	Giuseppe Sala	Ind	PD • EV • A • IV	2021–2026
Sesto San Giovanni	Roberto Di Stefano	LN	FI • LN • FdI	2022–2027
Cinisello Balsamo	Giacomo Giovanni Ghilardi	LN	FI • LN • FdI	2023–2028
Legnano	Lorenzo Radice	PD	PD • Ind	2020–2025
Rho	Andrea Orlandi	PD	PD • Ind	2021–2026
Paderno Dugnano	Anna Varisco	PD	PD • SI	2024–2029
Cologno Monzese	Stefano Zanelli	PD	PD • M5S • AVS	2023–2028
Rozzano	Giovanni Ferretti De Luca	LN	FI • LN • FdI	2024–2029
San Giuliano Milanese	Giacomo Giovanni Ghilardi	FI	FI • LN • FdI	2021–2026
Segrate	Paolo Micheli	PD	PD • Ind	2020–2025
Bollate	Franco Vassallo	PD	PD • SI	2020–2025
Pioltello	Ivonne Cosciotti	PD	PD • Ind	2021–2026
Cernusco sul Naviglio	Ermanno Zacchetti	PD	PD • Ind	2022–2027
Corsico	Stefano Martino Ventura	PD	PD • Ind	2020–2025
Abbiategrasso	Francesco Cesare Nai	Ind	FI • LN • FdI	2022–2027

== Demographics ==
Historical population
Year	Pop.	±%
1861	560,315	—
1871	597,445	+6.6%
1881	679,244	+13.7%
1901	916,600	+34.9%
1911	1,138,067	+24.2%
1921	1,276,056	+12.1%
1931	1,484,194	+16.3%
1936	1,670,396	+12.5%
1951	1,929,687	+15.5%
1961	2,494,598	+29.3%
1971	3,087,296	+23.8%
1981	3,139,490	+1.7%
1991	3,009,338	−4.1%
2001	2,940,579	−2.3%
2011	3,038,420	+3.3%
2021	3,214,630	+5.8%
Source: ISTAT

As of 2026, the population is 3,253,111, of which 48.9% are male, and 51.1% are female. Minors make up 14.8% of the population, and seniors make up 23.5%.

=== Immigration ===
As of 2025, immigrants make up 17.5% of the population. The 5 largest foreign countries of birth are Egypt, the Philippines, Peru, China, and Romania.

== Transport ==
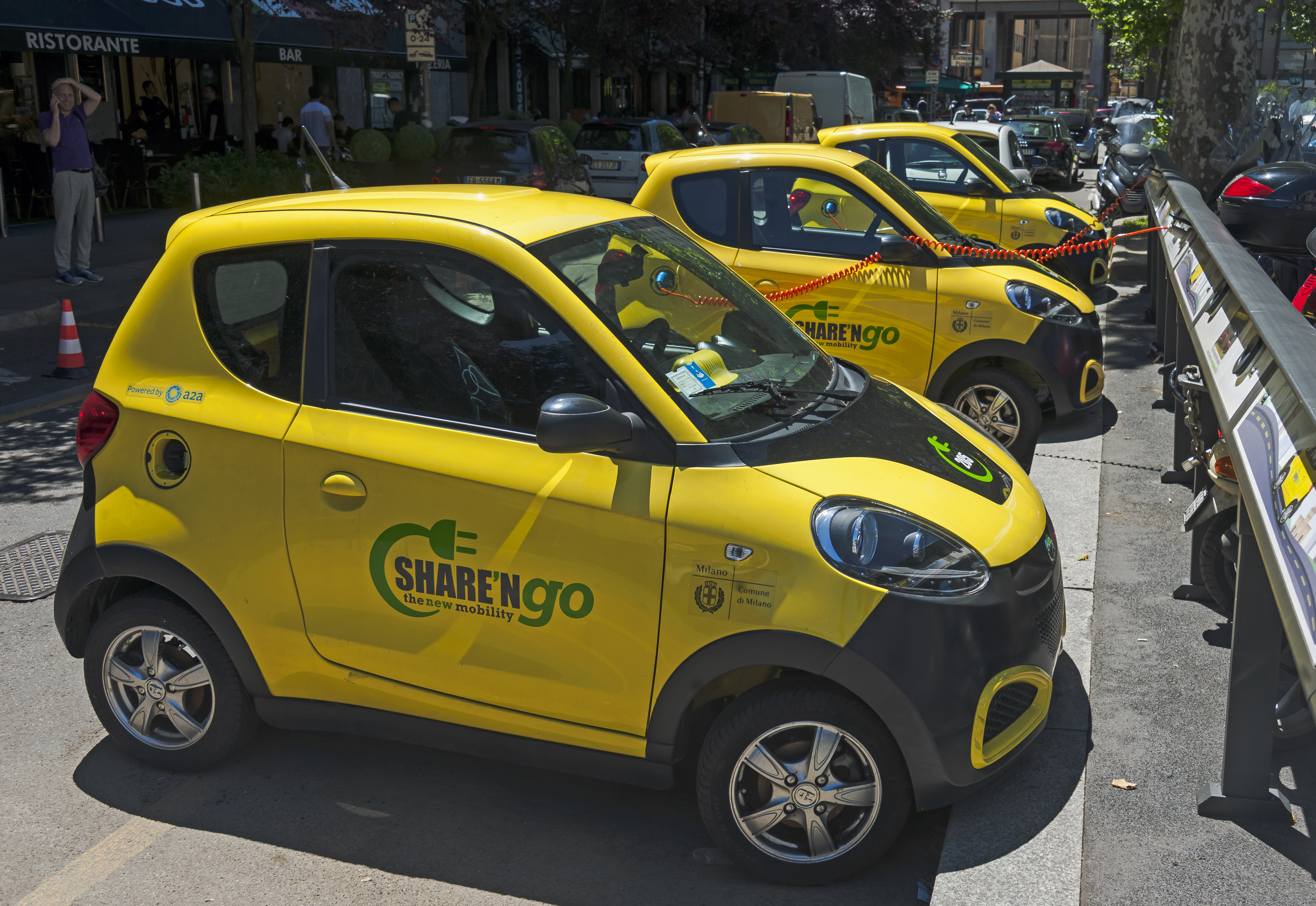
Carsharing cars in Piazza Duca d'Aosta

Milan is one of the key transport nodes of Italy and southern Europe. Its central railway station is Italy's second, after Rome Termini railway station, and Europe's eighth busiest. The Malpensa, Linate and Orio al Serio airports serve the Greater Milan, the largest metropolitan area in Italy.

Azienda Trasporti Milanesi (ATM) is the Milanese municipal transport company; it operates 5 metro lines, 18 tram lines, 131 bus lines, 4 trolleybus lines and 1 people mover line, carrying about 776 million passengers in 2018. Overall the network covers nearly 1,500 km (932 mi) reaching 46 municipalities. Besides public transport, ATM manages the interchange parking lots and other transport services including bike sharing and carsharing systems.

=== Cycling ===
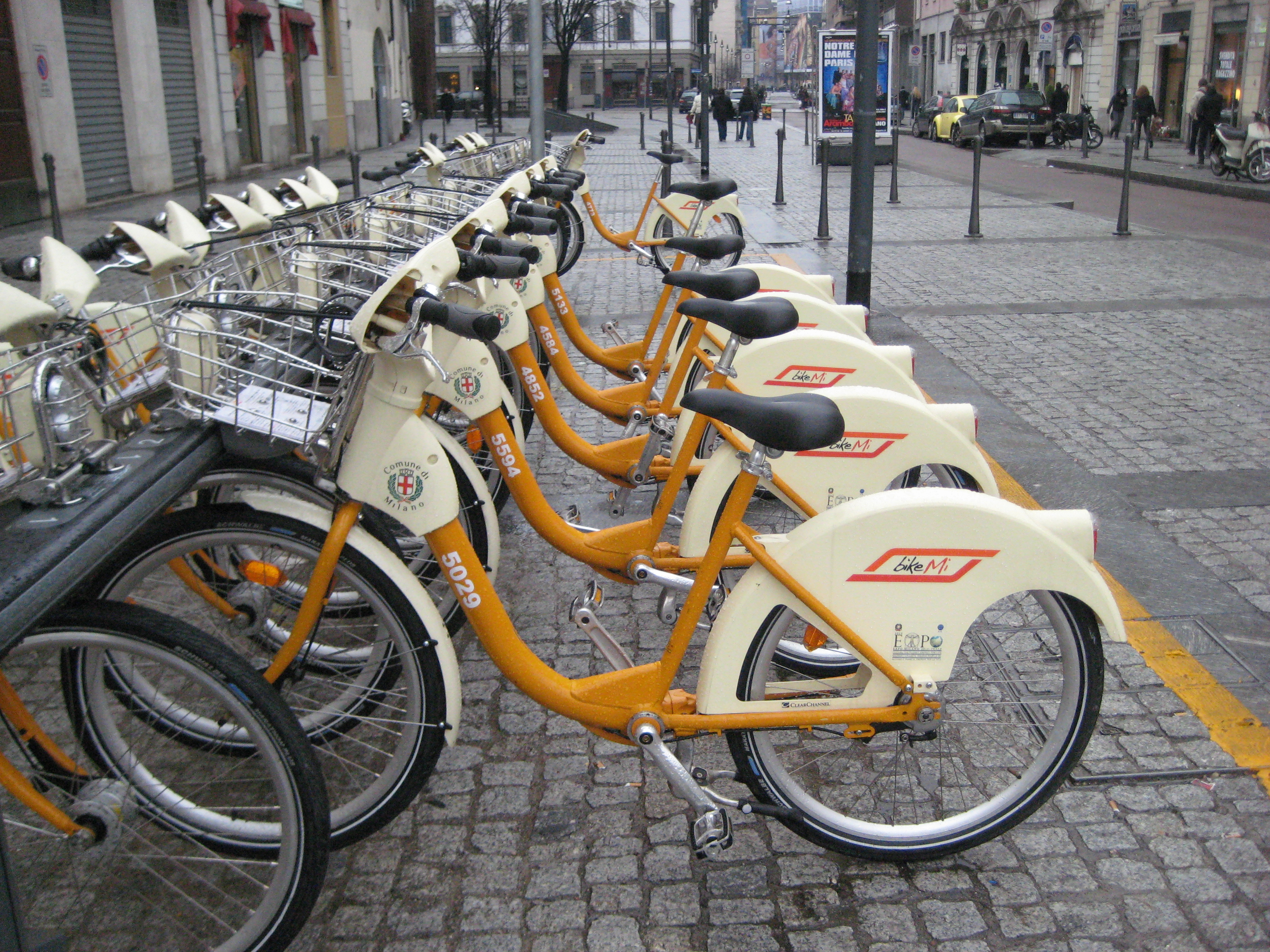
BikeMi station and bikes along Corso Garibaldi

The bicycle is becoming an increasingly important mode of transportation in Milan. Since 2008, the implementation of a city-wide network of bike paths has been initiated, to fight congestion and air pollution. During the COVID pandemic in 2019, 35 km of bike lanes were realized on short notice, to relieve pressure on the subway occupation.

The bike sharing system BikeMi has been deployed in almost all the city and enjoys increasing popularity. Stationless commercial bike and scooter sharing systems are widely available.

=== Rail ===
==== Underground ====
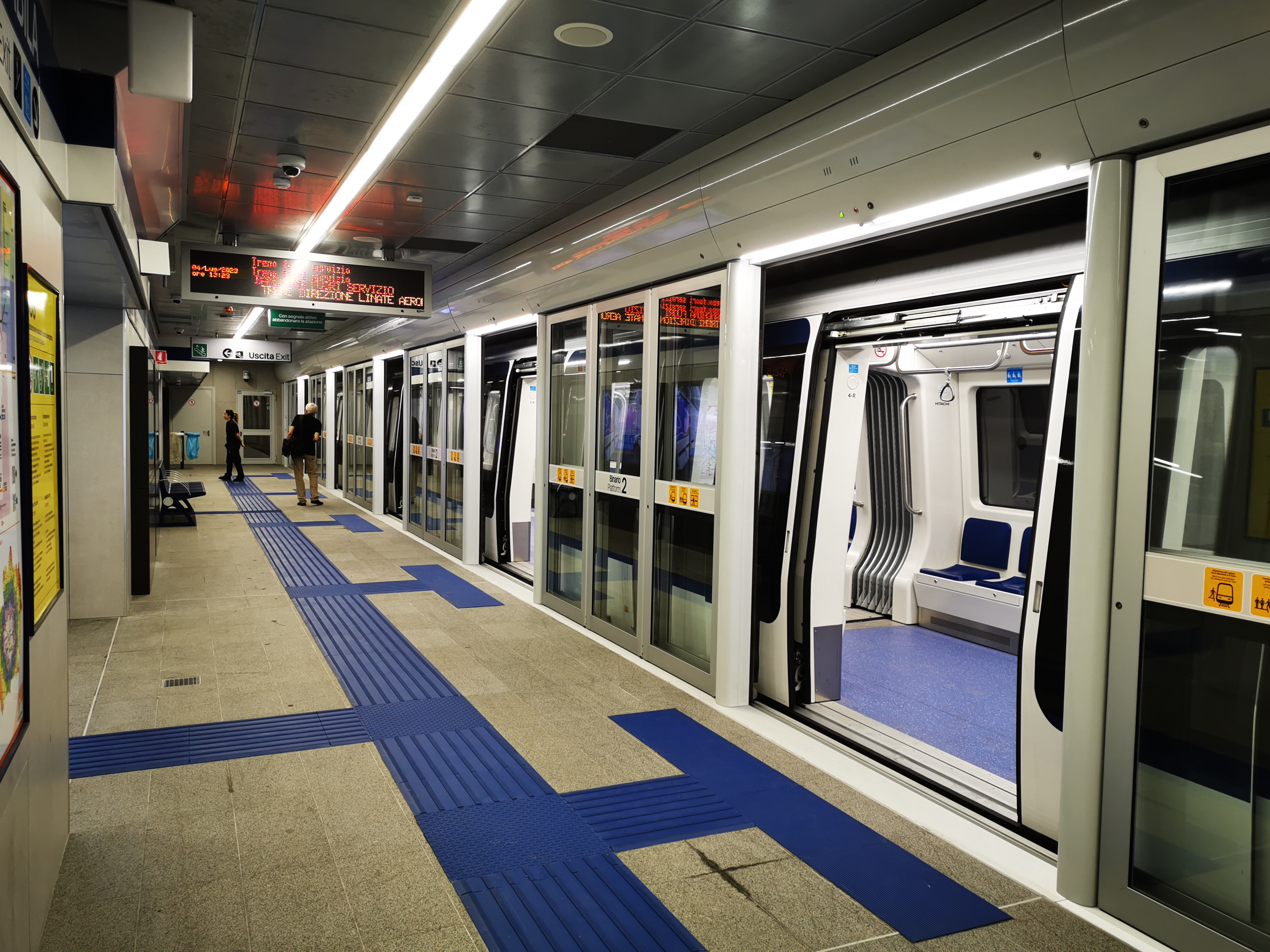
Milan Metro is the largest rapid transit system in Italy in terms of length, number of stations and ridership; and the fifth longest in the European Union and the eighth in the Europe.

The Milan Metro is the rapid transit system serving the city and surrounding municipalities. The network consists of 5 lines (M1, M2, M3, M4 and M5), with a total network length of 104 kilometres (65 mi), and a total of 121 stations, mostly underground. It has a daily ridership of 1.15 million, the largest in Italy as well as one of the largest in Europe.

The architectural project of the Milan Metro, created by Franco Albini and Franca Helg, and the signs, designed by Bob Noorda, received the Compasso d'Oro award in 1964. Within the European Union it is the seventh-largest network in terms of kilometres.

==== Suburban ====
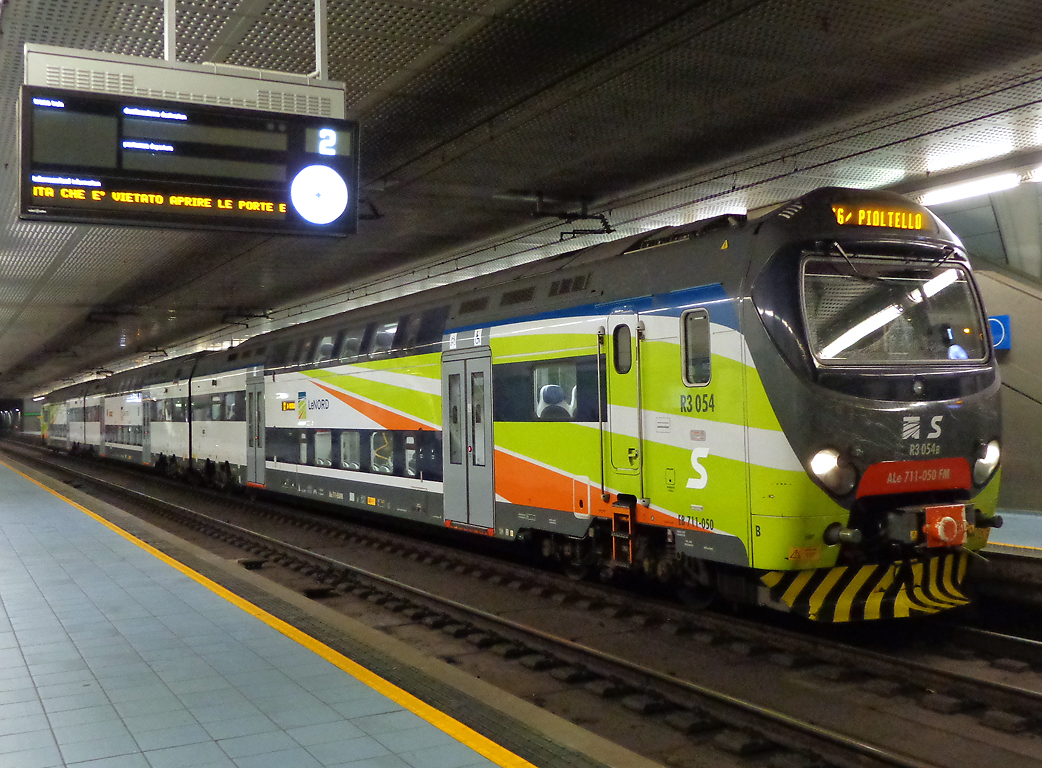
A TSR train at Milano Porta Venezia railway station on the Milan Passerby Railway

As of May 2023, the Milan suburban railway service, operated by Trenord, comprises 11 S lines connecting the metropolitan area with the city centre, with possible transfers to all the metro lines. Most S lines run through the Milan Passerby Railway, commonly referred to as "il Passante" and served by double-decker trains every 4/8 minutes in the central underground section. The system comprises 12 lines serving 124 stations, for a total length of 403 km. There are 415 trains per day with a daily ridership of about 230,000. The service timetable is based on a clock-face scheduling. Although operated by different companies, the Milan Metro and the suburban rail service have integrated tickets.

==== National and international trains ====
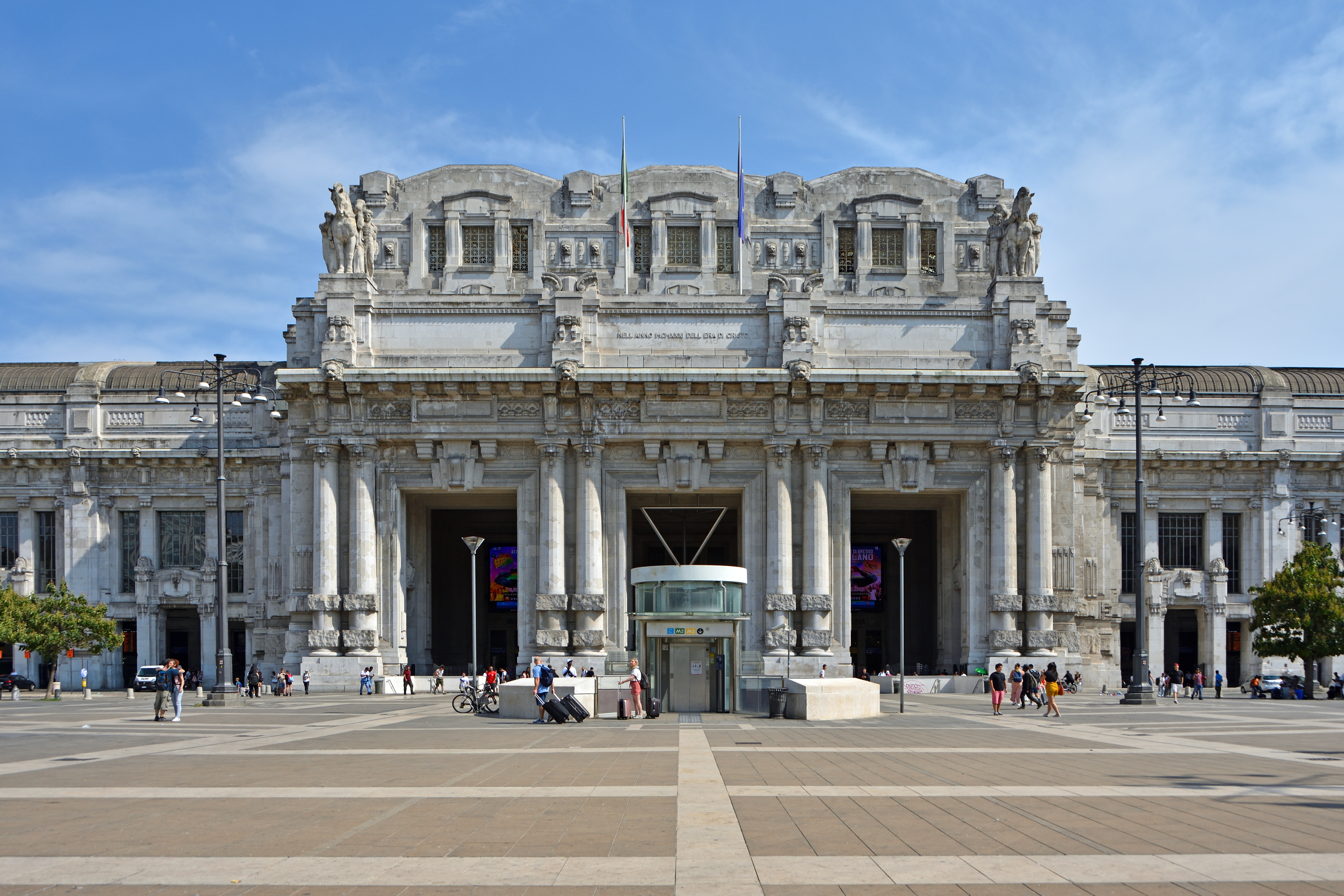
Milano Centrale railway station

Milan Central station, with 110 million passengers per year, is the largest and eighth-busiest railway station in Europe and the second busiest in Italy after Roma Termini. Milano Centrale railway station is the largest railway station in Europe by volume. Milano Cadorna and Milano Porta Garibaldi stations are, respectively, the seventh- and the eleventh-busiest stations in Italy. Since the end of 2009, two high-speed train lines link Milan to Rome, Naples and Turin, considerably shortening travel times with other major cities in Italy. Further high-speed lines are under construction towards Genoa and Verona. Milan is served by direct international trains to Nice, Marseille, Lyon, Paris, Lugano, Geneva, Bern, Basel, Zurich and Frankfurt, and by overnight sleeper services to Munich and Vienna (ÖBB). Overnight services to Paris were suspended in 2020 following the COVID lockdown and subsequently discontinued.

Milan is also the core of Lombardy's regional train network. Regional trains were operated on two different systems by Trenord (departing from Milano Cadorna) and Trenitalia (departing from Milan Centrale and Milano Porta Garibaldi). Since 2011 Trenord, has operated both Trenitalia and LeNord regional trains in Lombardy, carrying over 750,000 passengers on more than 50 routes every day.

=== Buses and trams ===
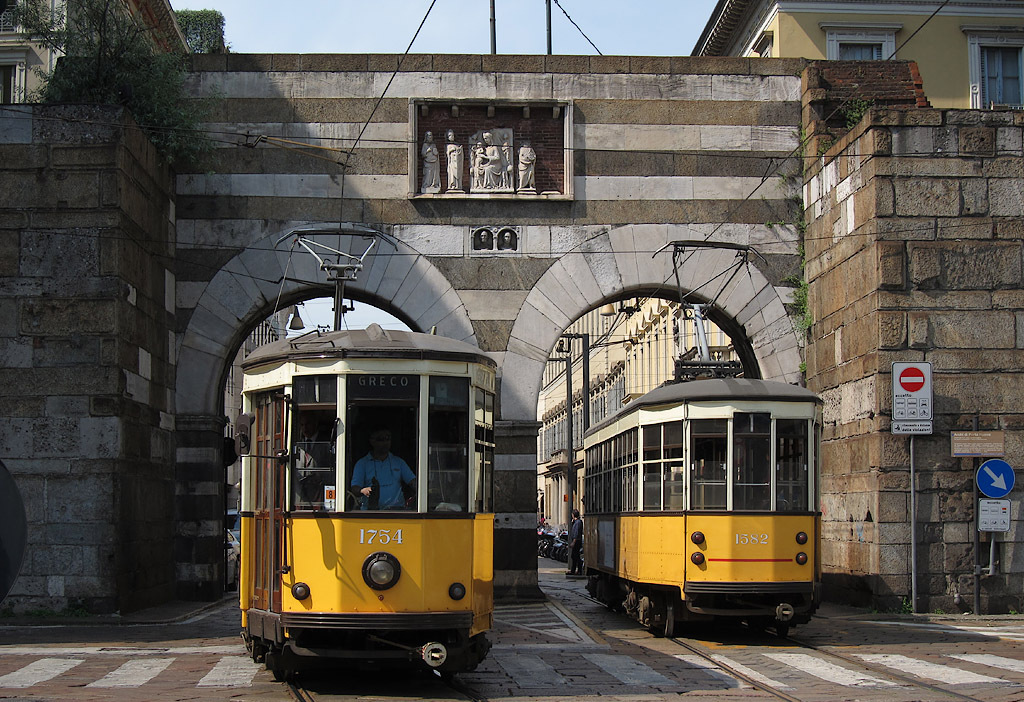
Intersecting trams under the arcs of Porta Nuova medieval gate. This type of historical trams are also used in San Francisco, United States

The city tram network consists of approximately 160 kilometres (99 mi) of track and 18 lines, and is Europe's most advanced light rail system. Bus lines cover over 1,070 km (665 mi). Milan also has taxi services operated by private companies and licensed by the City Council of Milan. The city is also a key node for the national road network, being served by all the major highways of Northern Italy. Numerous long-distance bus lines link Milan with many other cities and towns in Lombardy and throughout Italy.

=== Airports ===
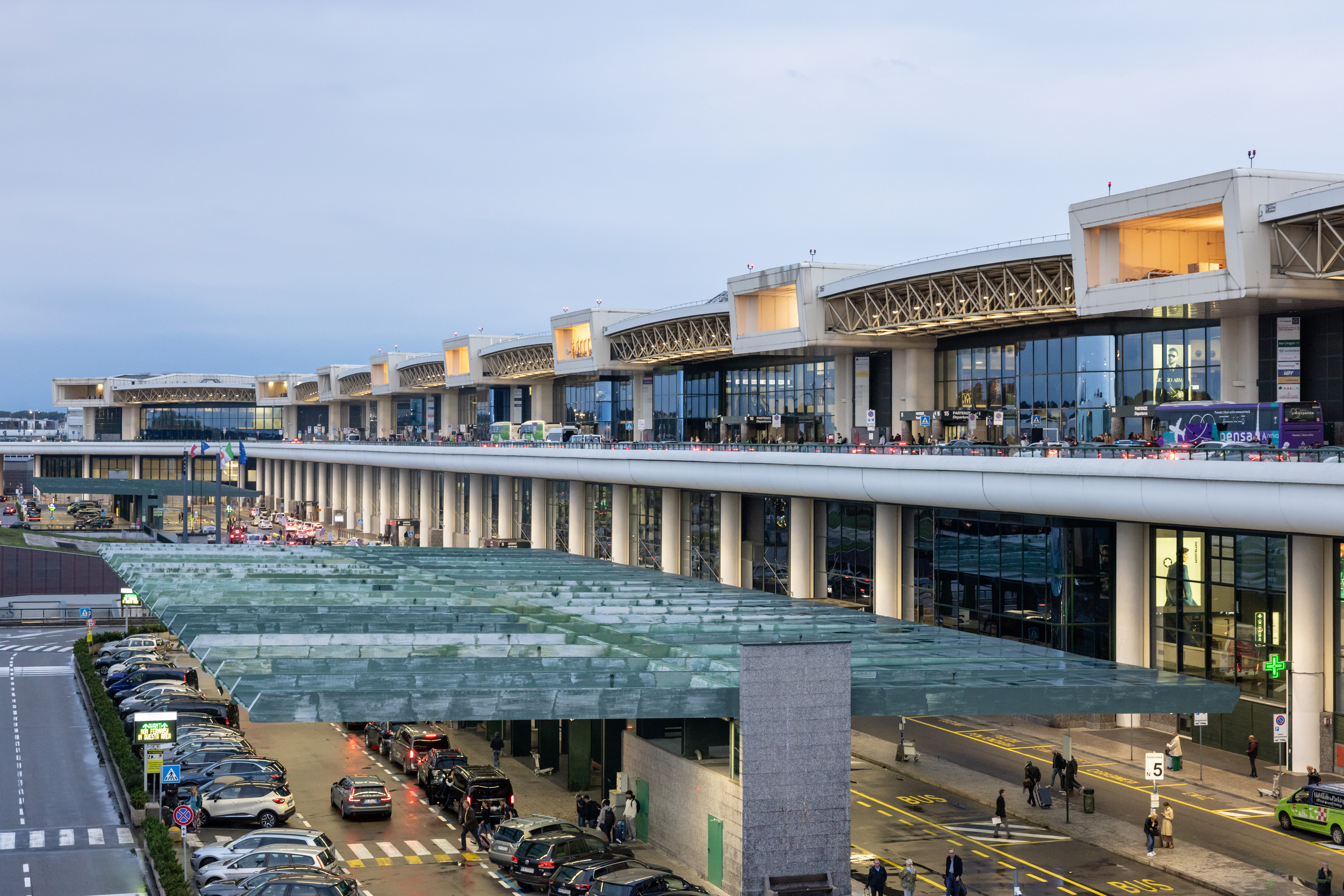
Milan Malpensa Airport

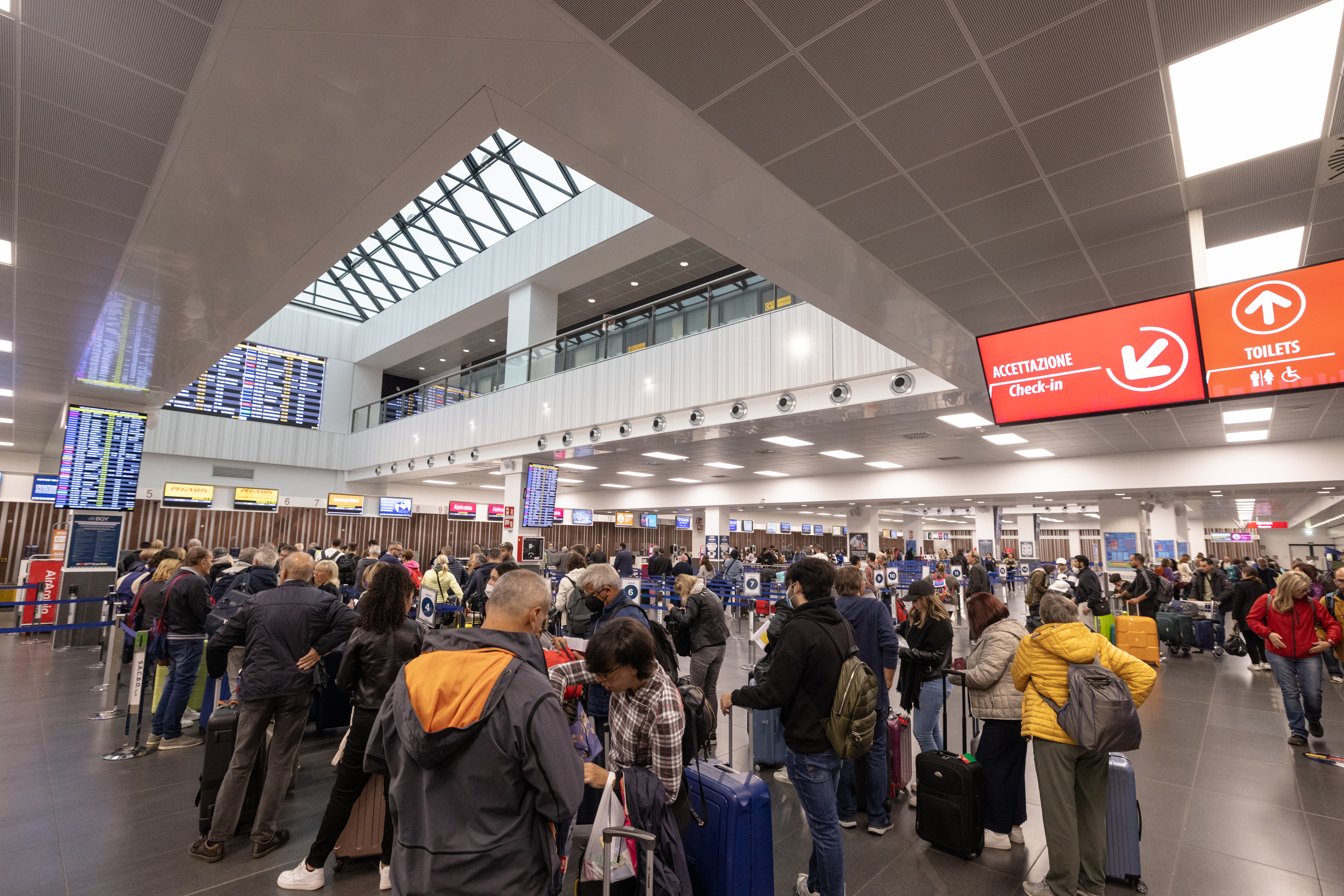
Departures area of the Milan Bergamo Airport

In the surroundings of Milan there are three airports dedicated to normal civilian traffic (Milan Malpensa Airport and Milan Linate Airport, managed by SEA, and Milan Bergamo Airport by SACBO).

Overall, the Milan airport system handles traffic of over 51.4 million passengers and around 700,000 tons of goods every year and is the first in Italy in terms of passenger volume and cargo volume (the second Italian airport system is Rome with 44.4 million passengers in 2023). The Milan Malpensa airport, with over 700 thousand tons, confirms the national leadership, processing 70% of the country's air cargo.

- The intercontinental hub of Milan Malpensa Airport (MXP) is Italy's second-busiest airport, after Rome Fiumicino Airport, with 24.1 million passengers served in 2023 and Italy's busiest for freight and cargo, handling about 700,000 tons of international freight in 2022. Malpensa Airport is the largest international airport in northern Italy, serving Lombardy, Piedmont and Liguria, as well as the Swiss Canton of Ticino. The airport is located 49 kilometres (30 mi) north-west of Milan, in the province of Varese next to the Ticino river dividing Lombardy and Piedmont. Malpensa airport is 9th in the world and 6th in Europe for the number of countries served with direct scheduled flights It is connected to Milan by the Malpensa Express railway service and by various bus lines. The airport is located inside the Parco naturale lombardo della Valle del Ticino, a nature reserve included by UNESCO in the World Network of Biosphere Reserves.
- Milan Linate Airport (LIN) is Milan's city airport, less than 8 kilometres (5 mi) from central Milan, and is mainly used for domestic and short-haul international flights. It served 8.6 million passengers in 2023 ranking as the 8th airport in Italy for passenger traffic. Linate Airport is hub of ITA Airways together with Rome Fiumicino Airport and is connected the centre of Milan via the M4 blue metro line.
- Milan Bergamo Airport (BGY) is mainly used for low-cost, charter and cargo flights. The airport is located in Orio al Serio, 3.7 km (2.3 mi) south-east of Bergamo and 45 km (28 mi) north-east of Milan. It is one of Ryanair's three main operating bases, along with Dublin Airport and London Stansted Airport. It served 14.7 million passengers in 2023. A bus service operated by ATB connects to the airport, about 10 minutes from the Bergamo railway station.

Lastly, Bresso Airfield is a general aviation airport, operated by Aero Club Milano. Since 1960 the airport mostly serves as a general aviation airfield for flying club activity, touristic flights and air taxi. It also hosts a base of the state helicopter emergency service Elisoccorso.

Map of Milan Metro and suburban railway service.

== See also ==
- Province of Milan
- Milan metropolitan area
