= Vittuone =

- Comune
- Comune di Vittuone
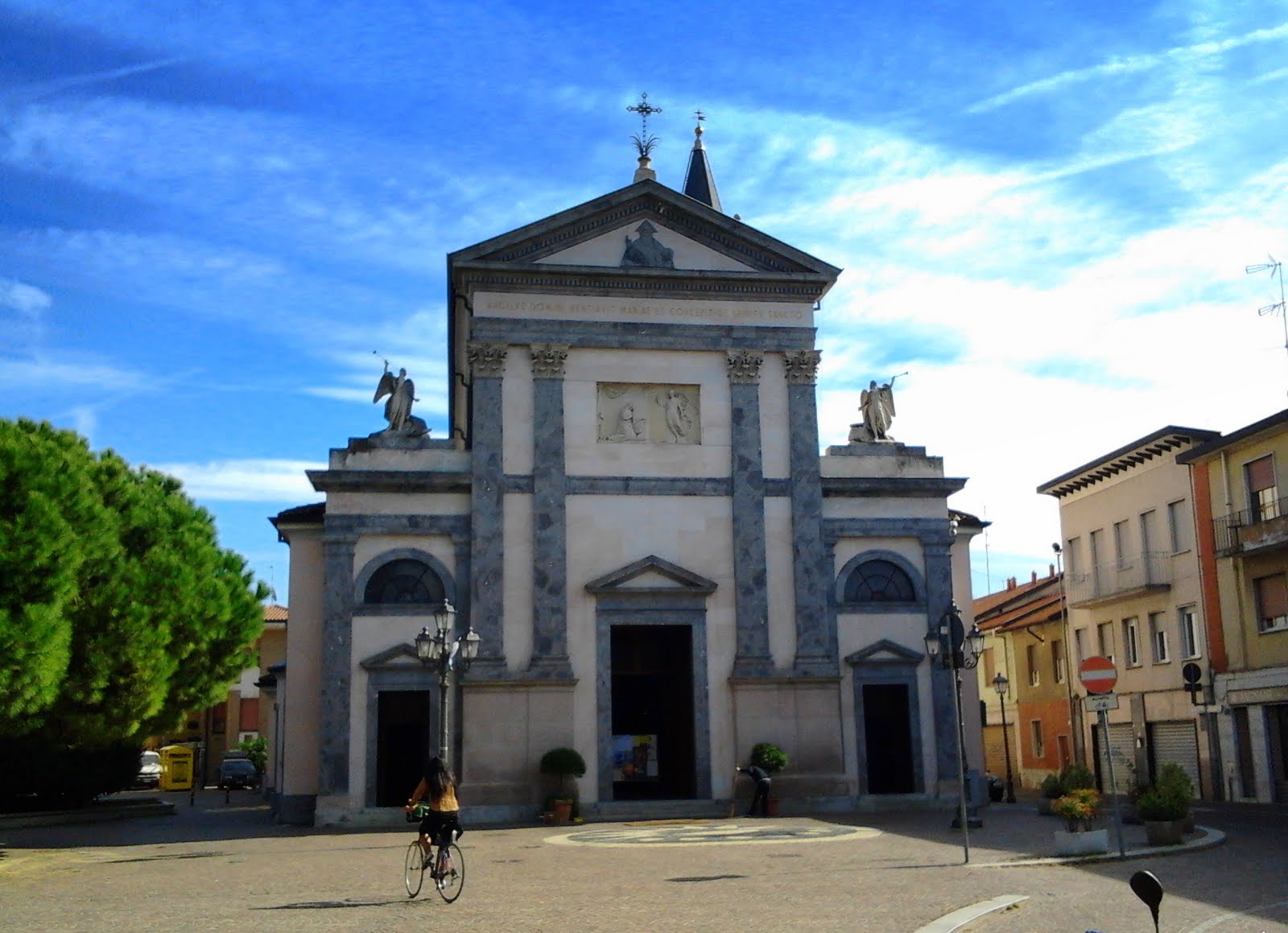
- The church of the Annunciazioni

- Coat of arms

- Location within Italy Location within Lombardy
- Coordinates: 45°29′N 8°57′E
- Country: Italy
- Region: Lombardy
- Metropolitan city: Milan (MI)

Area
  - Total: 6.0 km^{2} (2.3 sq mi)
- Elevation: 146 m (479 ft)

Population (31 December 2004)
  - Total: 8,361
  - Density: 1,400/km^{2} (3,600/sq mi)
- Demonym: Vittuonesi
- Time zone: UTC+1 (CET)
  - Summer (DST): UTC+2 (CEST)
- Postal code: 20010
- Dialing code: 02
- Saint day: 11 October
- Website: Official website

Vittuone (Lombard: Vittuòn [ʋityˈɔn]) is a comune (municipality) in the Province of Milan in the Italian region Lombardy, located about 15 kilometres (9 mi) west of Milan. As of 31 December 2004, it had a population of 8,361 and an area of 6.0 square kilometres (2.3 mi^{2}).

Vittuone borders the following municipalities: Arluno, Sedriano, Corbetta, and Cisliano

== Physical Geography ==
=== Territory ===
The municipality's territory has an elongated shape and borders west and south-west with Corbetta, south with Cisliano, east and north-east with Sedriano, lastly north with Arluno.

Vittuone is around 20 kilometers west from Lombardy's administrative center.

=== Geology & Hydrography ===
Morphologically, Vittuone's territory is characterized by the Padan Plain's tipical flat landform, mostly filled with woods or cultivation fields.

It's altitude is between 135 and 151 meters above sea level. Generally, territories in the municipalities have homogeneous characteristics in themselves.

One of Vittuone's most significant hydrographic features, like areas adjacent to inhabited zones, are the springs: they had ample economic relevance for agriculture and are today one of Parco Agricolo Sud Milano's main attraction.

Among the most famous springs in the area is the Saretta fontanil (where Mike Bongiorno's remains were found after his theft) to which popular legend has attributed miraculous waters and the Three Heads.

== Demographic Evolution ==
Historical population

Year	Pop.	±%
1861	1,743	—
1871	1,812	+4.0%
1881	1,980	+9.3%
1901	2,165	+9.3%
1911	2,248	+3.8%

Year	Pop.	±%
1921	2,223	−1.1%
1931	2,668	+20.0%
1936	2,813	+5.4%
1951	3,371	+19.8%
1961	4,103	+21.7%

Year	Pop.	±%
1971	5,906	+43.9%
1981	6,534	+10.6%
1991	7,267	+11.2%
2001	7,526	+3.6%

Source: Data from ISTAT
