= Truccazzano =

- Comune
- Comune di Truccazzano
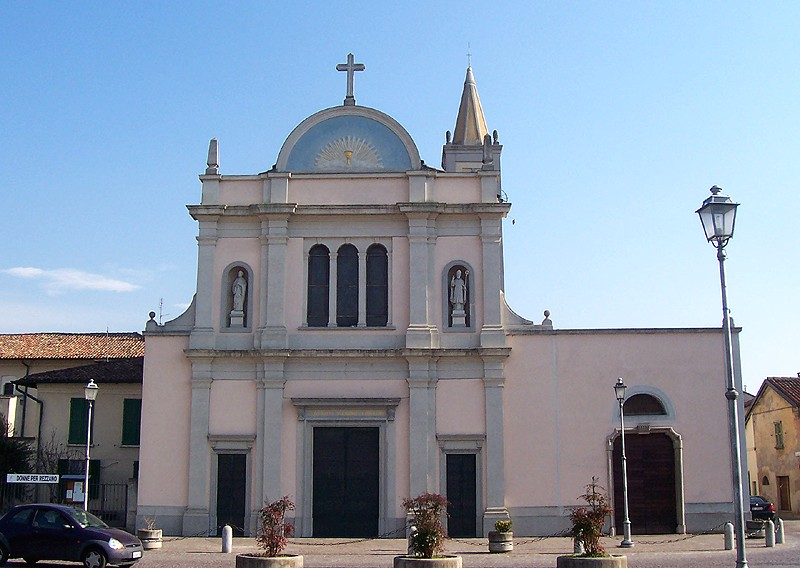
- Parish church of St. Michael

- Coat of arms

- Location within Italy Location within Lombardy
- Coordinates: 45°29′N 9°28′E
- Country: Italy
- Region: Lombardy
- Metropolitan city: Milan (MI)
- Frazioni: Albignano, Cavaione, Corneliano Bertario, Incugnate

Government
  - Mayor: from 2009 Vittorio Angelo Sartirana

Area
  - Total: 22.2 km^{2} (8.6 sq mi)

Population (Dec. 2004)
  - Total: 4,830
  - Density: 218/km^{2} (563/sq mi)
- Time zone: UTC+1 (CET)
  - Summer (DST): UTC+2 (CEST)
- Postal code: 20060
- Dialing code: 02
- Website: Official website

Truccazzano (Lombard: Truccazzan [trykaˈsãː]) is a comune (municipality) in the Province of Milan in the Italian region Lombardy, located about 25 kilometres (16 mi) east of Milan.
