= Ozzero =

Ozzero Voeus'ger, Oeus'ger (Lombard)
- Comune
- Comune di Ozzero
- Location within Italy Location within Lombardy
- Coordinates: 45°22′N 8°55′E
- Country: Italy
- Region: Lombardy
- Metropolitan city: Milan (MI)
- Frazioni: Soria Vecchia, Bugo

Government
  - Mayor: Mr. Guglielmo Villani

Area
  - Total: 11.0 km^{2} (4.2 sq mi)

Population (Dec. 2004)
  - Total: 1,337
  - Density: 122/km^{2} (315/sq mi)
- Demonym: ozzeresi
- Time zone: UTC+1 (CET)
  - Summer (DST): UTC+2 (CEST)
- Postal code: 20080
- Dialing code: 02
- Patron saint: San Siro
- Website: Official website

Ozzero (Milanese: Voeus'ger or Oeus'ger [(ʋ)øˈzdʒeːr]) is a comune (municipality) in the Province of Milan in the Italian region Lombardy, located about 25 kilometres (16 mi) southwest of Milan. As of 31 December 2004, it had a population of 1,337 and an area of 11.0 square kilometres (4.2 mi^{2}).

The municipality of Ozzero contains the frazioni (subdivisions, mainly villages and hamlets) Soria Vecchia and Bugo.

Ozzero borders the following municipalities: Abbiategrasso and Morimondo.

The comune of Ozzero within the province of Milan

== Demographic evolution ==
Historical population

Year	Pop.	±%
1861	1,216	—
1871	1,232	+1.3%
1881	1,210	−1.8%
1901	1,221	+0.9%
1911	1,217	−0.3%

Year	Pop.	±%
1921	1,335	+9.7%
1931	1,190	−10.9%
1936	1,174	−1.3%
1951	1,352	+15.2%
1961	1,186	−12.3%

Year	Pop.	±%
1971	1,126	−5.1%
1981	1,283	+13.9%
1991	1,294	+0.9%
2001	1,347	+4.1%

Source: Data from ISTAT
