= Sedriano =

- Comune
- Comune di Sedriano
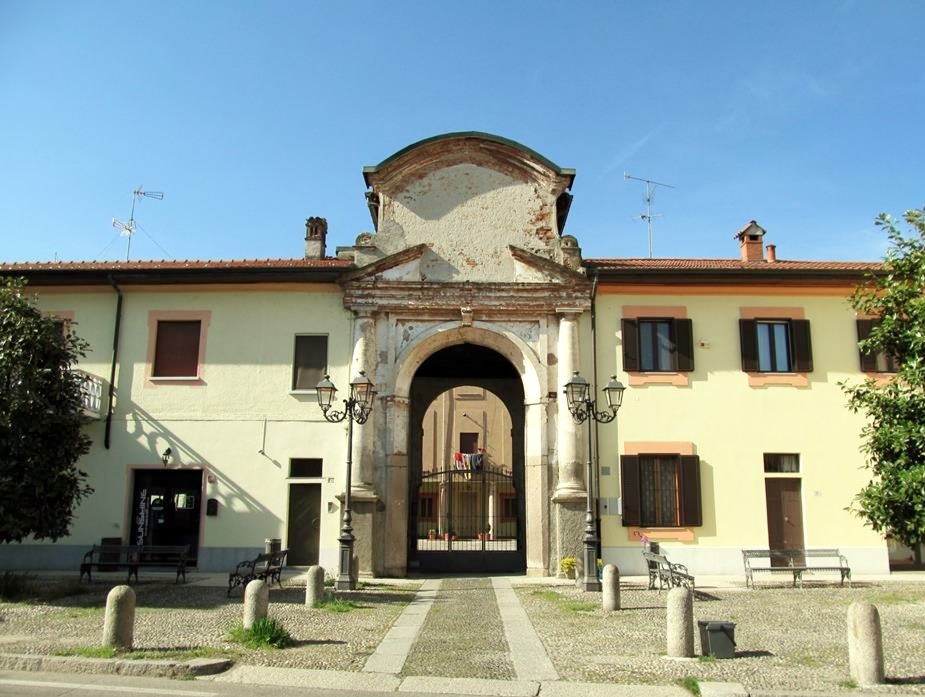
- Palazzo Borromeo Arese

- Location within Italy Location within Lombardy
- Coordinates: 45°29′N 8°58′E
- Country: Italy
- Region: Lombardy
- Metropolitan city: Milan (MI)
- Frazioni: Roveda

Government
  - Mayor: Angelo Cipriani

Area
  - Total: 7.9 km^{2} (3.1 sq mi)
- Elevation: 145 m (476 ft)

Population (31 December 2015)
  - Total: 11,969
  - Density: 1,500/km^{2} (3,900/sq mi)
- Demonym: Sedrianesi
- Time zone: UTC+1 (CET)
  - Summer (DST): UTC+2 (CEST)
- Postal code: 20018
- Dialing code: 02
- Website: Official website

Sedriano (Lombard: Sidrian [siˈdrjãː]) is a comune (municipality) in the Metropolitan City of Milan in the Italian region Lombardy, located about 15 kilometres (9 mi) west of Milan.

Sedriano borders the following municipalities: Vanzago, Pregnana Milanese, Arluno, Bareggio, Vittuone, Cisliano.
