= Pregnana Milanese =

- Comune
- Comune di Pregnana Milanese
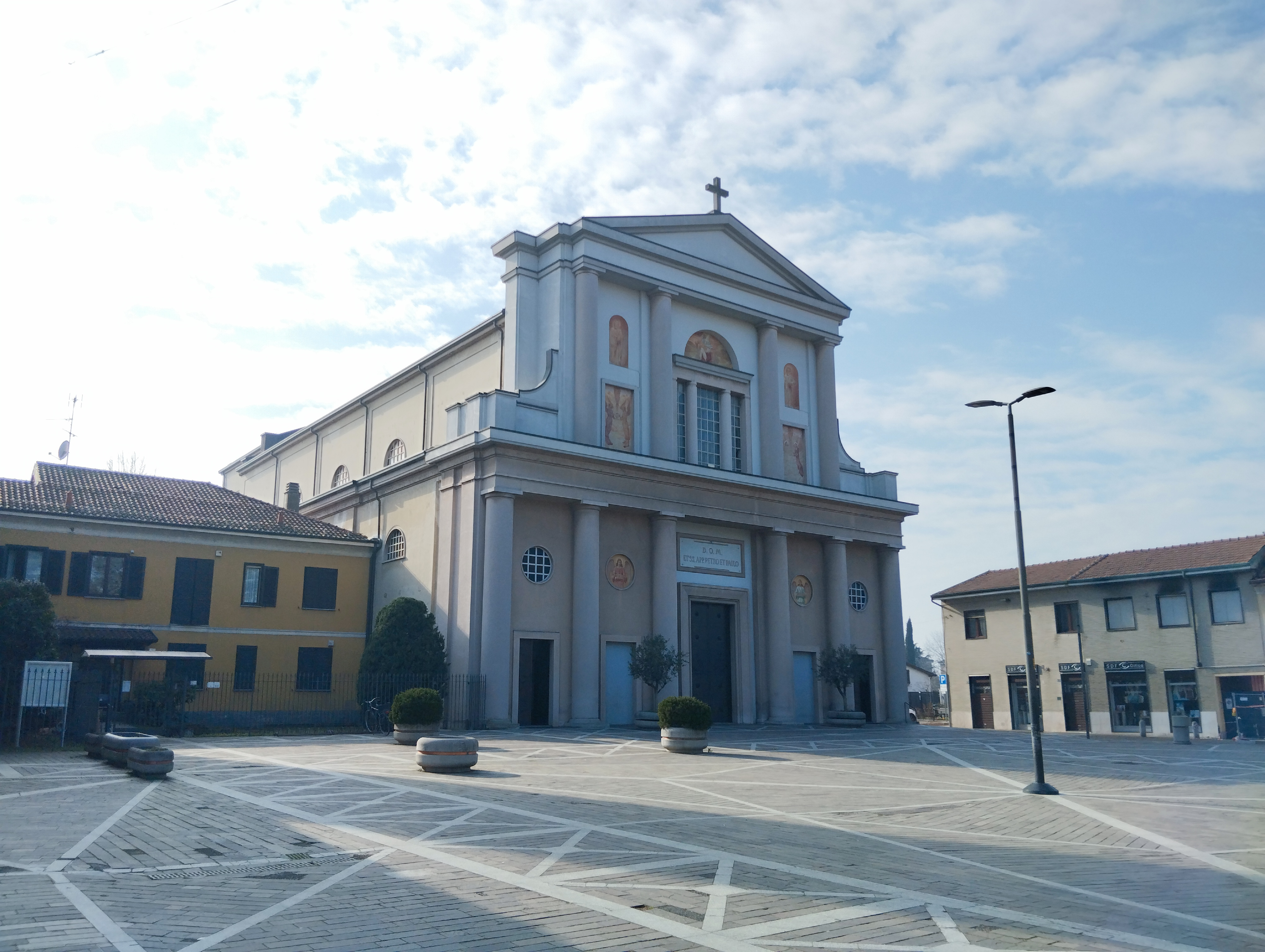
- The church of Saints Peter and Paul

- Location within Italy Location within Lombardy
- Coordinates: 45°31′N 9°1′E
- Country: Italy
- Region: Lombardy
- Metropolitan city: Milan (MI)
- Frazioni: Bareggio, Cornaredo, Pogliano Milanese, Rho, Sedriano, Vanzago

Government
  - Mayor: Angelo Bosani

Area
  - Total: 5.07 km^{2} (1.96 sq mi)
- Elevation: 154 m (505 ft)

Population (1 January 2017)
  - Total: 7,306
  - Density: 1,440/km^{2} (3,730/sq mi)
- Demonym: Pregnanesi
- Time zone: UTC+1 (CET)
  - Summer (DST): UTC+2 (CEST)
- Postal code: 20010
- Dialing code: 02
- ISTAT code: 015179
- Website: Official website

Pregnana Milanese is a town located in the Metropolitan City of Milan, Lombardy, northern Italy.

It is served by Pregnana Milanese railway station.
