= Pantigliate =

Pantigliate Pantejaa (Lombard)
- Comune
- Comune di Pantigliate
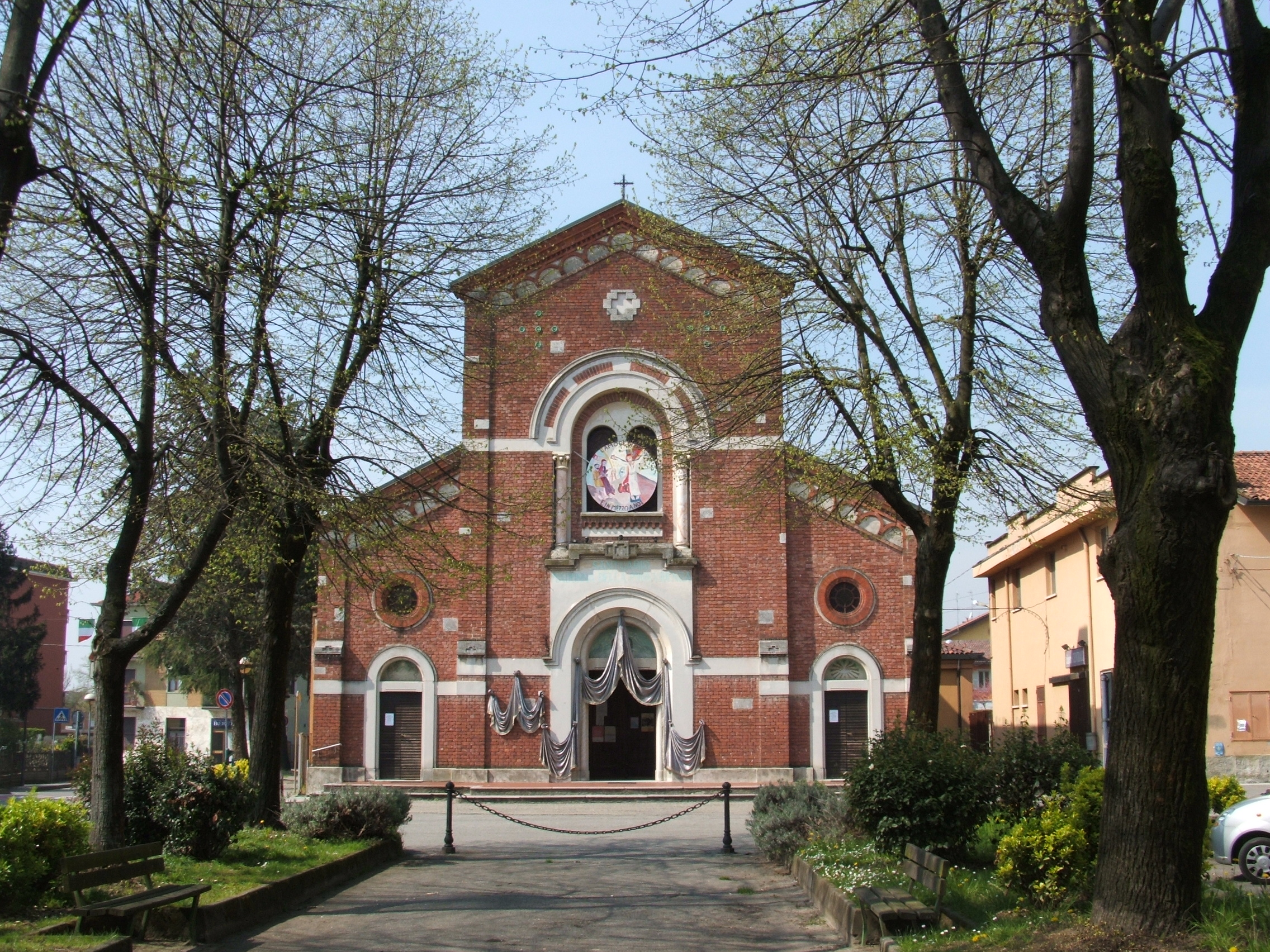
- Sanctuary of Madonna della Provvidenza.

- Coat of arms

- Location within Italy Location within Lombardy
- Coordinates: 45°26′N 9°21′E
- Country: Italy
- Region: Lombardy
- Metropolitan city: Milan (MI)

Government
  - Mayor: Franco Abate

Area
  - Total: 5.69 km^{2} (2.20 sq mi)
- Elevation: 102 m (335 ft)

Population (31 December 2017)
  - Total: 6,058
  - Density: 1,060/km^{2} (2,760/sq mi)
- Demonym: Pantigliatesi
- Time zone: UTC+1 (CET)
  - Summer (DST): UTC+2 (CEST)
- Postal code: 20048
- Dialing code: 02
- ISTAT code: 015167
- Website: Official website

Pantigliate (Lombard: Pantijaa [pãtiˈjaː] or Pantejaa [pãteˈjaː]) is a comune (municipality) in the Metropolitan City of Milan in the Italian region Lombardy, located about 15 kilometres (9 mi) east of Milan.

Pantigliate borders the following municipalities: Rodano, Settala, Peschiera Borromeo, Mediglia.
