= Cisliano =

- Comune
- Comune di Cisliano
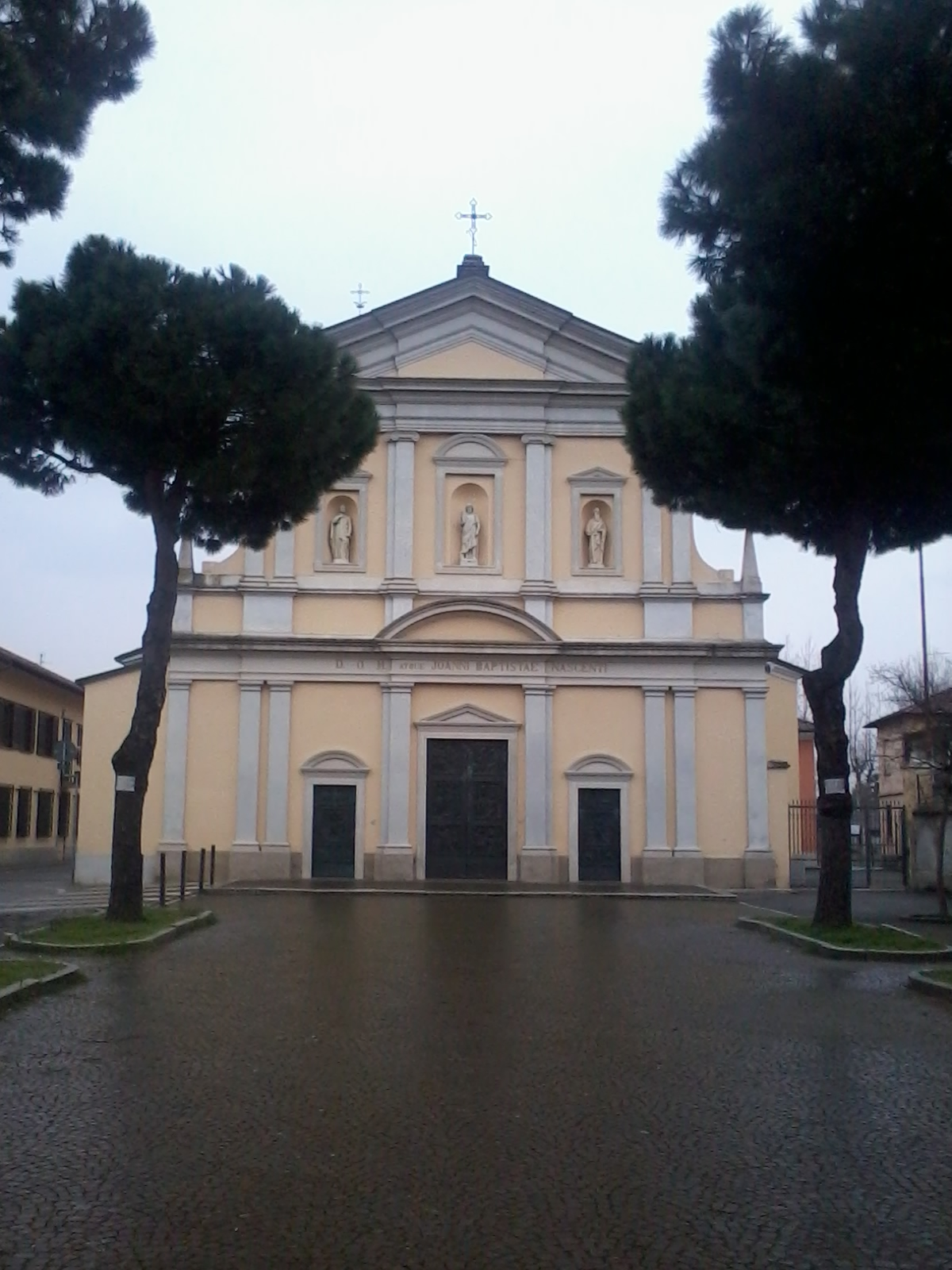
- Parish church of St. John the Baptist

- Location within Italy Location within Lombardy
- Coordinates: 45°27′N 8°59′E
- Country: Italy
- Region: Lombardy
- Metropolitan city: Milan (MI)

Government
  - Mayor: Ilaria Mora

Area
  - Total: 14.7 km^{2} (5.7 sq mi)
- Elevation: 128 m (420 ft)

Population (30 June 2017)
  - Total: 4,857
  - Density: 330/km^{2} (856/sq mi)
- Demonym: Cislianesi
- Time zone: UTC+1 (CET)
  - Summer (DST): UTC+2 (CEST)
- Postal code: 20080
- Dialing code: 02
- Patron saint: St. John the Baptist
- Website: Official website

Cisliano (Lombard: Cislian [tʃiˈzljãː] or Sisian [siˈzjãː]) is a comune (municipality) in the Metropolitan City of Milan in the Italian region of Lombardy, located about 14 kilometres (9 mi) west of Milan.

Cisliano borders the municipalities of Sedriano, Bareggio, Vittuone, Corbetta, Cusago, Albairate, and Gaggiano.
