= Trezzano sul Naviglio =

Trezzano sul Naviglio Trezzan sul Navili (Lombard)
- Comune
- Comune di Trezzano sul Naviglio
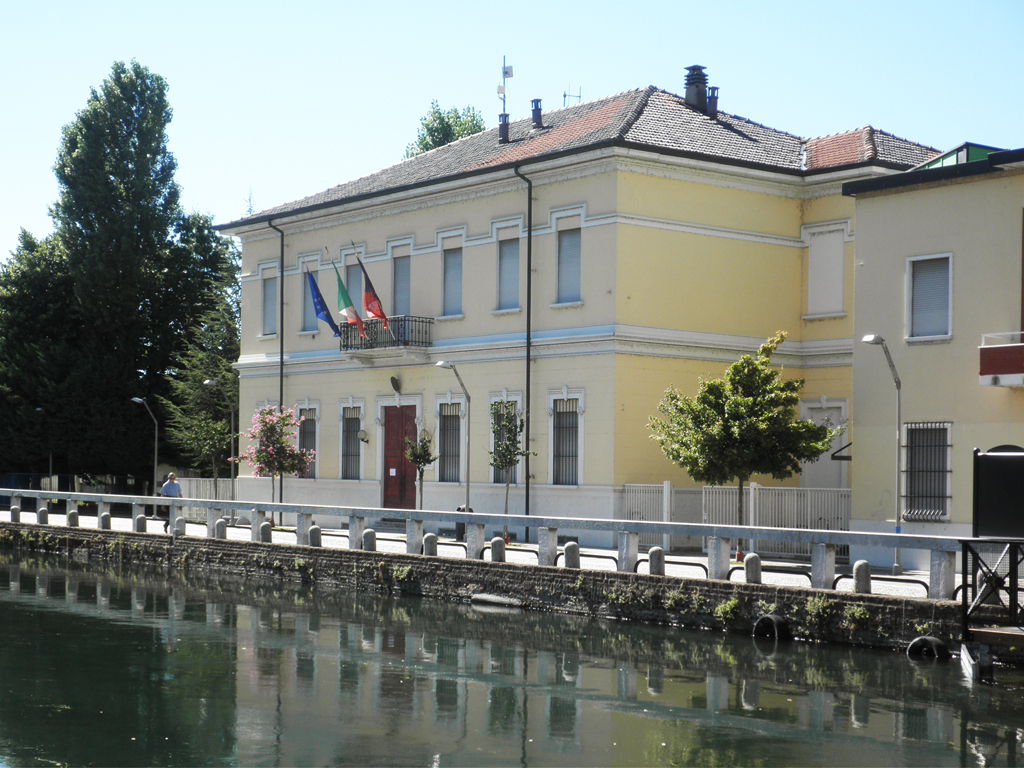
- View of the city hall

- Coat of arms

- Location within Italy Location within Lombardy
- Coordinates: 45°26′N 9°4′E
- Country: Italy
- Region: Lombardy
- Metropolitan city: Milan (MI)

Government
  - Mayor: Fabio Bottero

Area
  - Total: 10.8 km^{2} (4.2 sq mi)
- Elevation: 116 m (381 ft)

Population (31 December 2010)
  - Total: 19,350
  - Density: 1,790/km^{2} (4,640/sq mi)
- Demonym: Trezzanesi
- Time zone: UTC+1 (CET)
  - Summer (DST): UTC+2 (CEST)
- Postal code: 20090
- Dialing code: 02
- Website: Official website

Trezzano sul Naviglio (Milanese: Trezzan sul Navili or simply Trezzan [treˈsãː (syl naˈʋiːli)]) is a comune (municipality) in the Metropolitan City of Milan in the Italian region Lombardy, located about 9 km (6 mi) southwest of Milan.

Trezzano sul Naviglio borders the municipalities of Buccinasco, Cusago, Cesano Boscone, Corsico, Gaggiano, Milan, and Zibido San Giacomo. It is served by Trezzano sul Naviglio railway station.
