= Bubbiano =

Municipality in Lombardy, Italy

Bubbiano Bibian (Lombard)
- Comune
- Comune di Bubbiano
- Coat of arms

- Location within Italy Location within Lombardy
- Coordinates: 45°20′N 9°1′E
- Country: Italy
- Region: Lombardy
- Metropolitan city: Milan (MI)

Government
  - Mayor: Patrizia Gentile

Area
  - Total: 2.95 km^{2} (1.14 sq mi)
- Elevation: 106 m (348 ft)

Population (31 December 2017)
  - Total: 2,400
  - Density: 810/km^{2} (2,100/sq mi)
- Demonym: Bubbianesi
- Time zone: UTC+1 (CET)
  - Summer (DST): UTC+2 (CEST)
- Postal code: 20088
- Dialing code: 02
- Website: Official website

Bubbiano (Milanese: Bibian [biˈbjãː]) is a comune (municipality) in the Metropolitan City of Milan in the Italian region Lombardy, located about 20 kilometres (12 mi) southwest of Milan.

Bubbiano borders the following municipalities: Morimondo, Rosate, Calvignasco, Casorate Primo.
