= Bareggio =

- Comune
- Comune di Bareggio
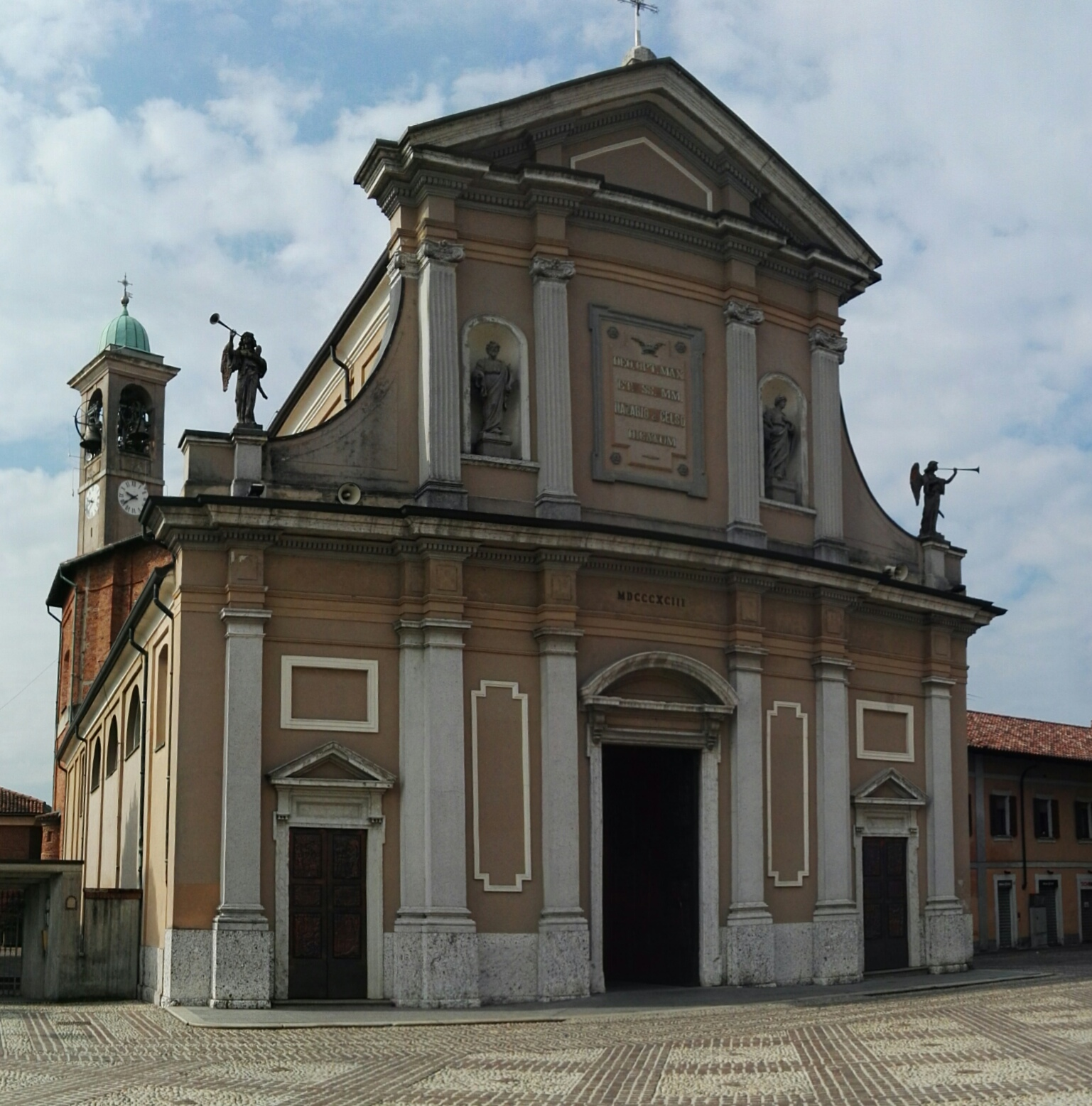
- The church of San Nazaro and Celso

- Coat of arms

- Location within Italy Location within Lombardy
- Coordinates: 45°28′N 8°59′E
- Country: Italy
- Region: Lombardy
- Metropolitan city: Milan (MI)

Government
  - Mayor: Linda Colombo

Area
  - Total: 11.38 km^{2} (4.39 sq mi)
- Elevation: 138 m (453 ft)

Population (30 November 2017)
  - Total: 17,309
  - Density: 1,521/km^{2} (3,939/sq mi)
- Demonym: Bareggesi
- Time zone: UTC+1 (CET)
  - Summer (DST): UTC+2 (CEST)
- Postal code: 20010
- Dialing code: 02
- Website: Official website

Bareggio (Lombard: Baregg [baˈreːtʃ]) is a comune (municipality) in the Metropolitan City of Milan in the Italian region Lombardy, located about 14 kilometres (9 mi) west of Milan.

Bareggio borders the following municipalities: Pregnana Milanese, Cornaredo, Sedriano, Cusago, Cisliano.
