= Cusago =

Cusago Cusagh (Lombard)
- Comune
- Comune di Cusago
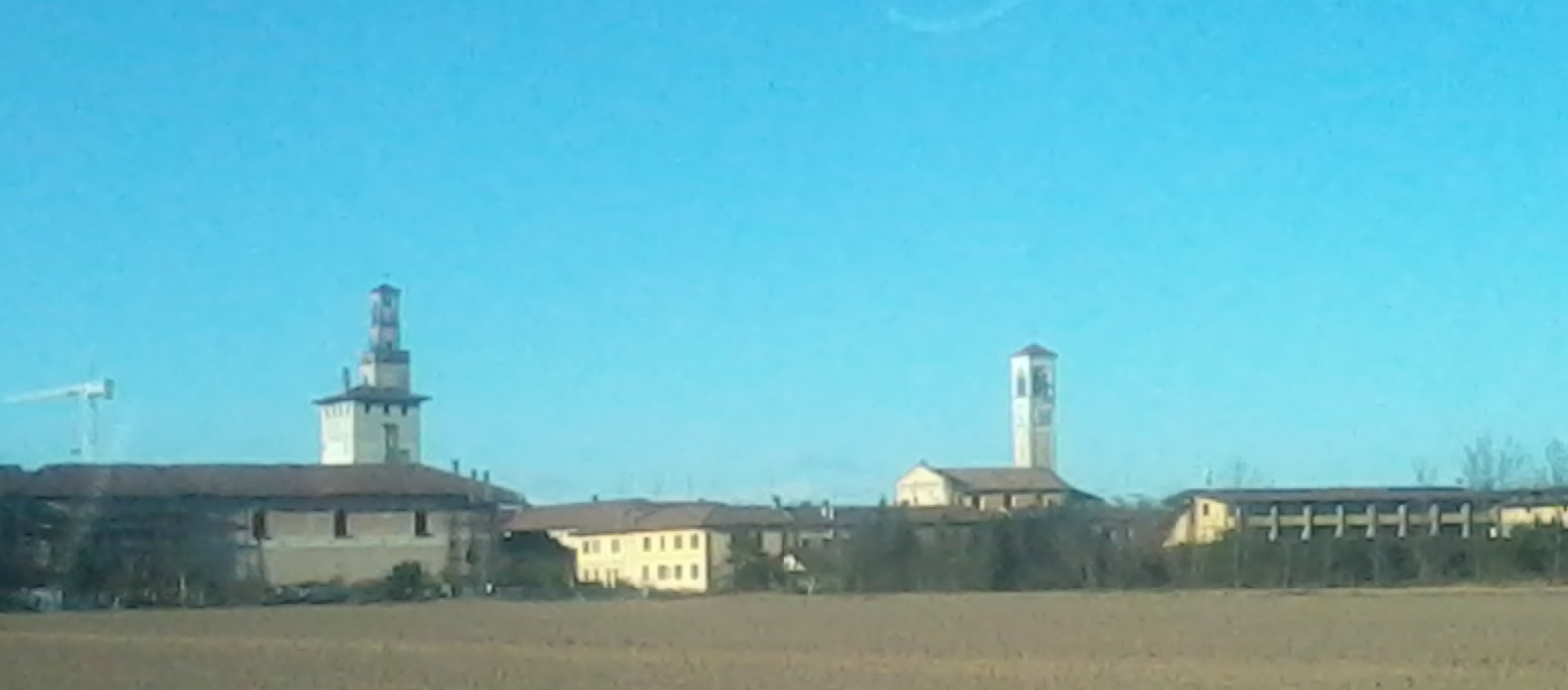

- Coat of arms

- Location within Italy Location within Lombardy
- Coordinates: 45°27′N 9°2′E
- Country: Italy
- Region: Lombardy
- Metropolitan city: Milan (MI)

Government
  - Mayor: Daniela Palazzoli

Area
  - Total: 11.5 km^{2} (4.4 sq mi)
- Elevation: 126 m (413 ft)

Population (30 April 2015)
  - Total: 3,845
  - Density: 334/km^{2} (866/sq mi)
- Demonym: Cusaghesi
- Time zone: UTC+1 (CET)
  - Summer (DST): UTC+2 (CEST)
- Postal code: 20047
- Dialing code: 02
- Website: Official website

Cusago (Lombard: Cusagh [kyˈzaːk]) is a comune (municipality) in the Metropolitan City of Milan in the Italian region Lombardy, located about 11 kilometres (7 mi) west of Milan.

Cusago borders the following municipalities: Milan, Cornaredo, Settimo Milanese, Bareggio, Cisliano, Trezzano sul Naviglio, Gaggiano.

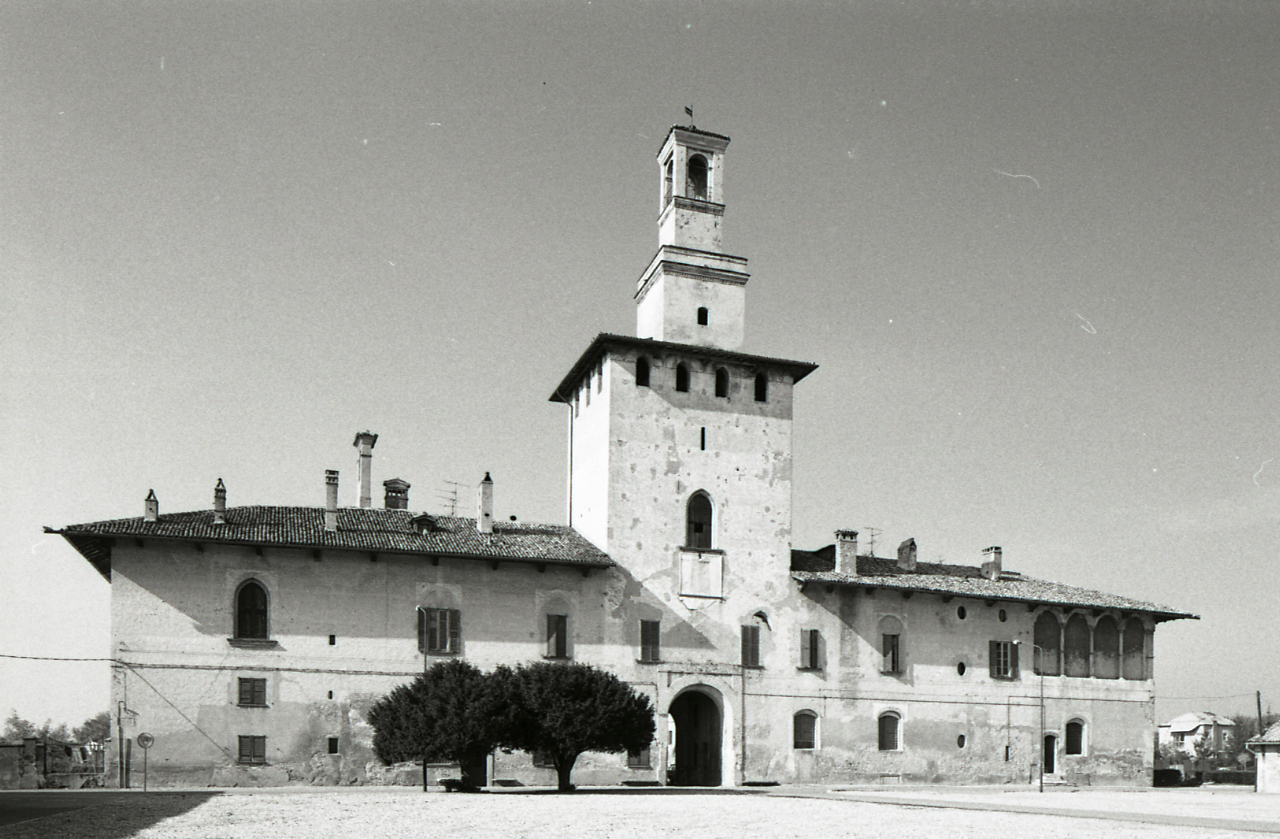
Visconti castle, Cusago. Photo by Paolo Monti.
