= Gaggiano =

- Comune
- Comune di Gaggiano
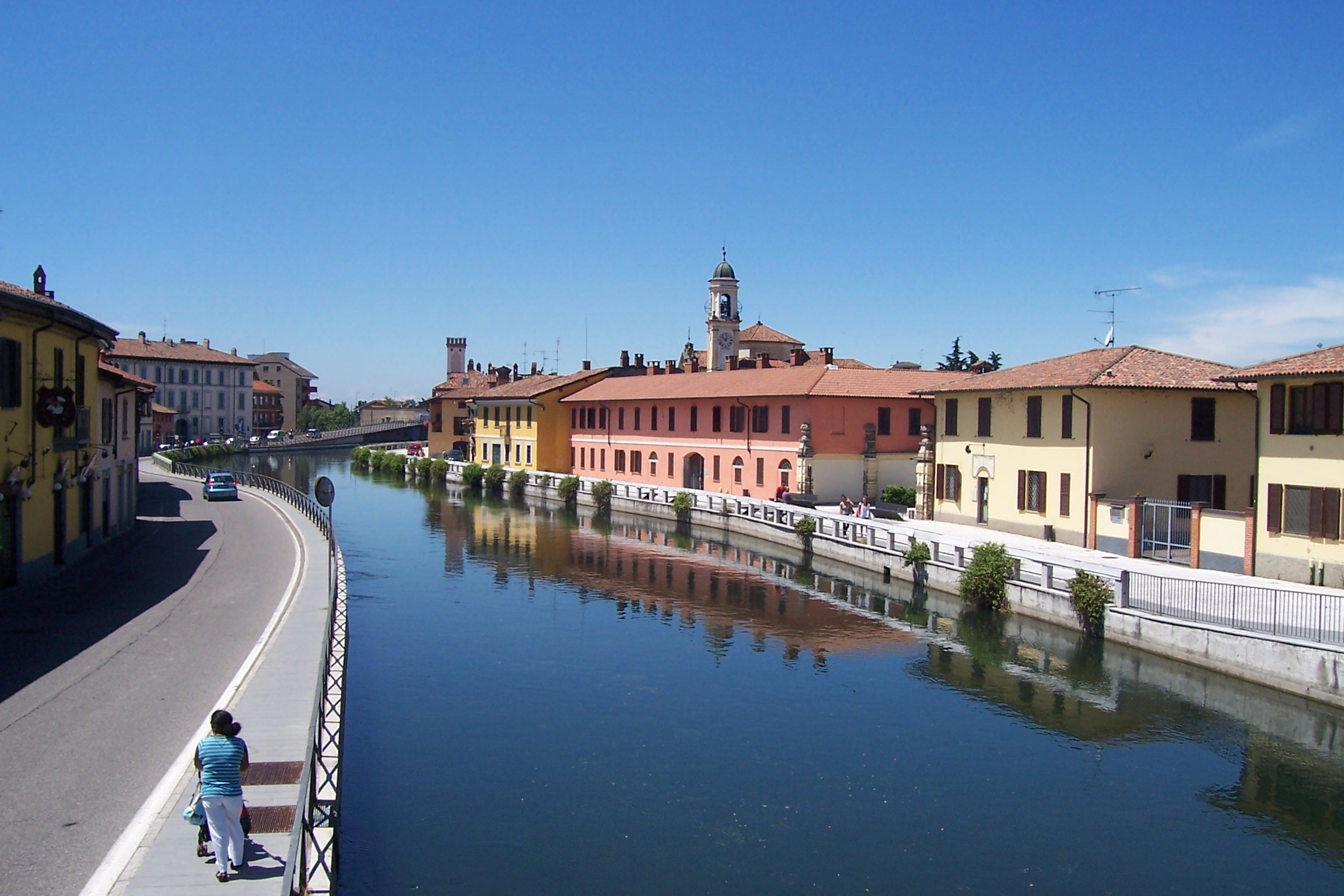
- The Naviglio Grande river at Gaggiano

- Location within Italy Location within Lombardy
- Coordinates: 45°24′N 9°2′E
- Country: Italy
- Region: Lombardy
- Metropolitan city: Milan (MI)

Area
  - Total: 26.7 km^{2} (10.3 sq mi)

Population (Dec. 2004)
  - Total: 8,360
  - Density: 313/km^{2} (811/sq mi)
- Time zone: UTC+1 (CET)
  - Summer (DST): UTC+2 (CEST)
- Postal code: 20083
- Dialing code: 02
- Website: Official website

Gaggiano (Lombard: Gaggian or Gasgian [ɡaˈ(d)ʒãː]) is a comune (municipality) in the Province of Milan in the Italian region Lombardy, located about 13 kilometres (8 miles) southwest of Milan. As of 31 December 2004, it had a population of 8,360 and an area of 26.7 square kilometres (10.3 sq mi).

Gaggiano borders the following municipalities: Cusago, Cisliano, Albairate, Trezzano sul Naviglio, Vermezzo, Zibido San Giacomo, Gudo Visconti, Noviglio, Rosate.

Gaggiano is served by Gaggiano railway station.

== Demographic evolution ==
Historical population

Year	Pop.	±%
1861	3,184	—
1871	3,458	+8.6%
1881	3,357	−2.9%
1901	3,845	+14.5%
1911	3,972	+3.3%

Year	Pop.	±%
1921	4,012	+1.0%
1931	4,147	+3.4%
1936	4,256	+2.6%
1951	4,742	+11.4%
1961	5,026	+6.0%

Year	Pop.	±%
1971	5,338	+6.2%
1981	6,928	+29.8%
1991	8,008	+15.6%
2001	8,111	+1.3%

Source: Data from ISTAT

== International relations ==
=== Twin towns — Sister cities ===
Gaggiano is twinned with:

- Albertirsa in Hungary (since 1992)
