= Calvignasco =

Calvignasco Calvignasch (Lombard)
- Comune
- Comune di Calvignasco
- Coat of arms

- Location within Italy Location within Lombardy
- Coordinates: 45°20′N 9°2′E
- Country: Italy
- Region: Lombardy
- Metropolitan city: Milan (MI)

Government
  - Mayor: Giuseppe Gandini

Area
  - Total: 1.73 km^{2} (0.67 sq mi)
- Elevation: 105 m (344 ft)

Population (30 November 2017)
  - Total: 1,197
  - Density: 692/km^{2} (1,790/sq mi)
- Demonym: Calvignaschesi
- Time zone: UTC+1 (CET)
  - Summer (DST): UTC+2 (CEST)
- Postal code: 20088
- Dialing code: 02
- Website: Official website

Calvignasco (Milanese: Calvignasch [kalʋiˈɲask]) is a comune (municipality) in the Metropolitan City of Milan in the Italian region Lombardy, about 20 kilometres (12 mi) southwest of Milan.

Calvignasco borders the municipalities of Rosate, Vernate, Bubbiano, Casorate Primo.
