= Isola Sant'Antonio =

- Comune
- Comune di Isola Sant'Antonio
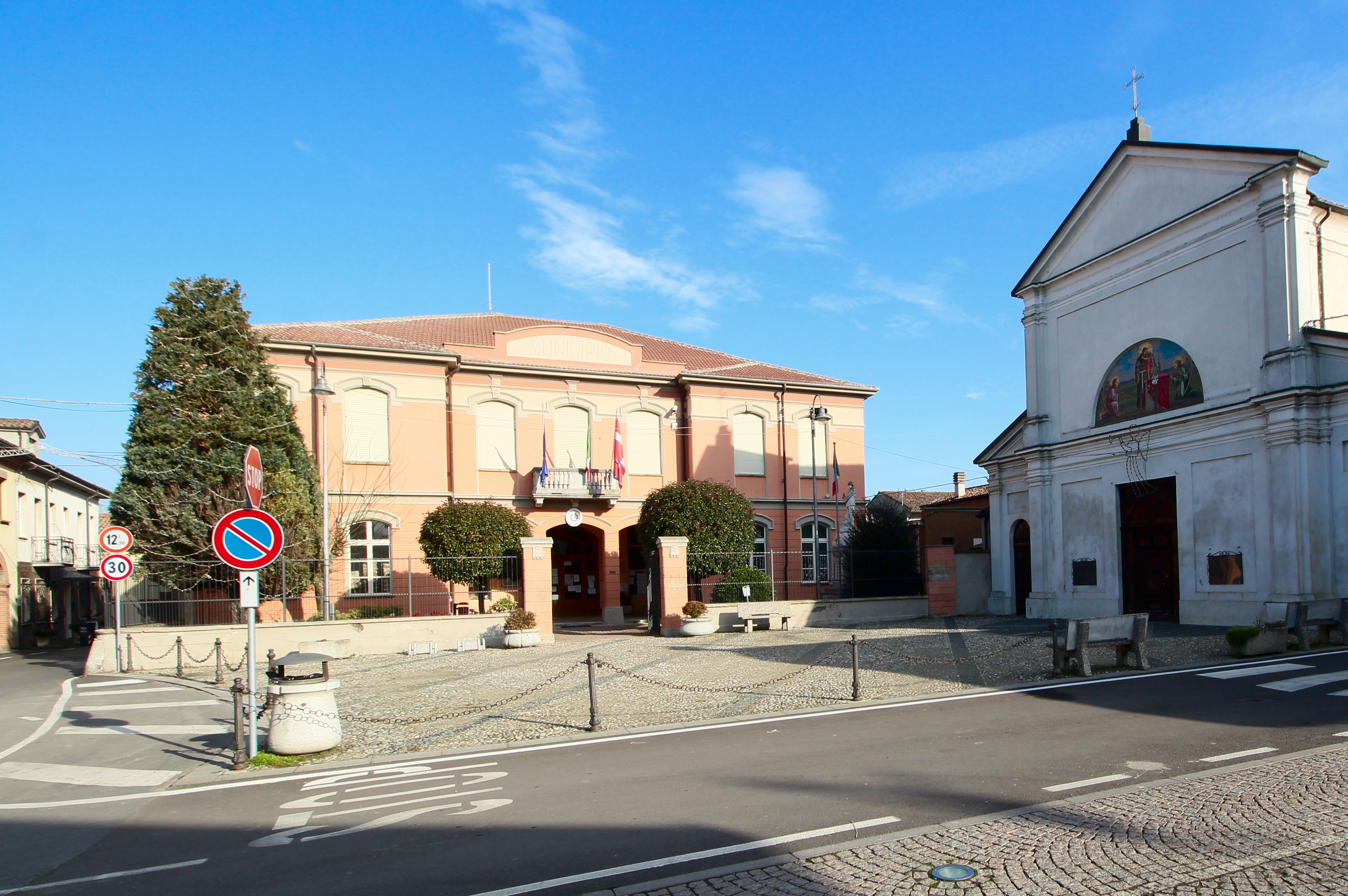

- Coat of arms

- Location within Italy Location within Piedmont
- Coordinates: 45°1′50″N 8°51′1″E
- Country: Italy
- Region: Piedmont
- Province: Alessandria (AL)

Government
  - Mayor: Cristian Scotti

Area
  - Total: 23.55 km^{2} (9.09 sq mi)
- Elevation: 76 m (249 ft)

Population (31 August 2017)
  - Total: 689
  - Density: 29.3/km^{2} (75.8/sq mi)
- Demonym: Isolani
- Time zone: UTC+1 (CET)
  - Summer (DST): UTC+2 (CEST)
- Postal code: 15050
- Dialing code: 0131
- Website: Official website

Isola Sant'Antonio is a comune (municipality) in the Province of Alessandria in the Italian region Piedmont, located about 90 kilometres (56 mi) east of Turin and about 20 kilometres (12 mi) northeast of Alessandria.

Isola Sant'Antonio borders the following municipalities: Alluvioni Piovera, Alzano Scrivia, Bassignana, Casei Gerola, Castelnuovo Scrivia, Cornale, Gambarana, Guazzora, Mezzana Bigli, Molino dei Torti, Pieve del Cairo, and Sale.

== Twin towns ==
- Saint-Jean-de-Folleville, France
