= Bastida de' Dossi =

Municipality in Lombardy, Italy

- Comune
- Comune di Bastida de' Dossi
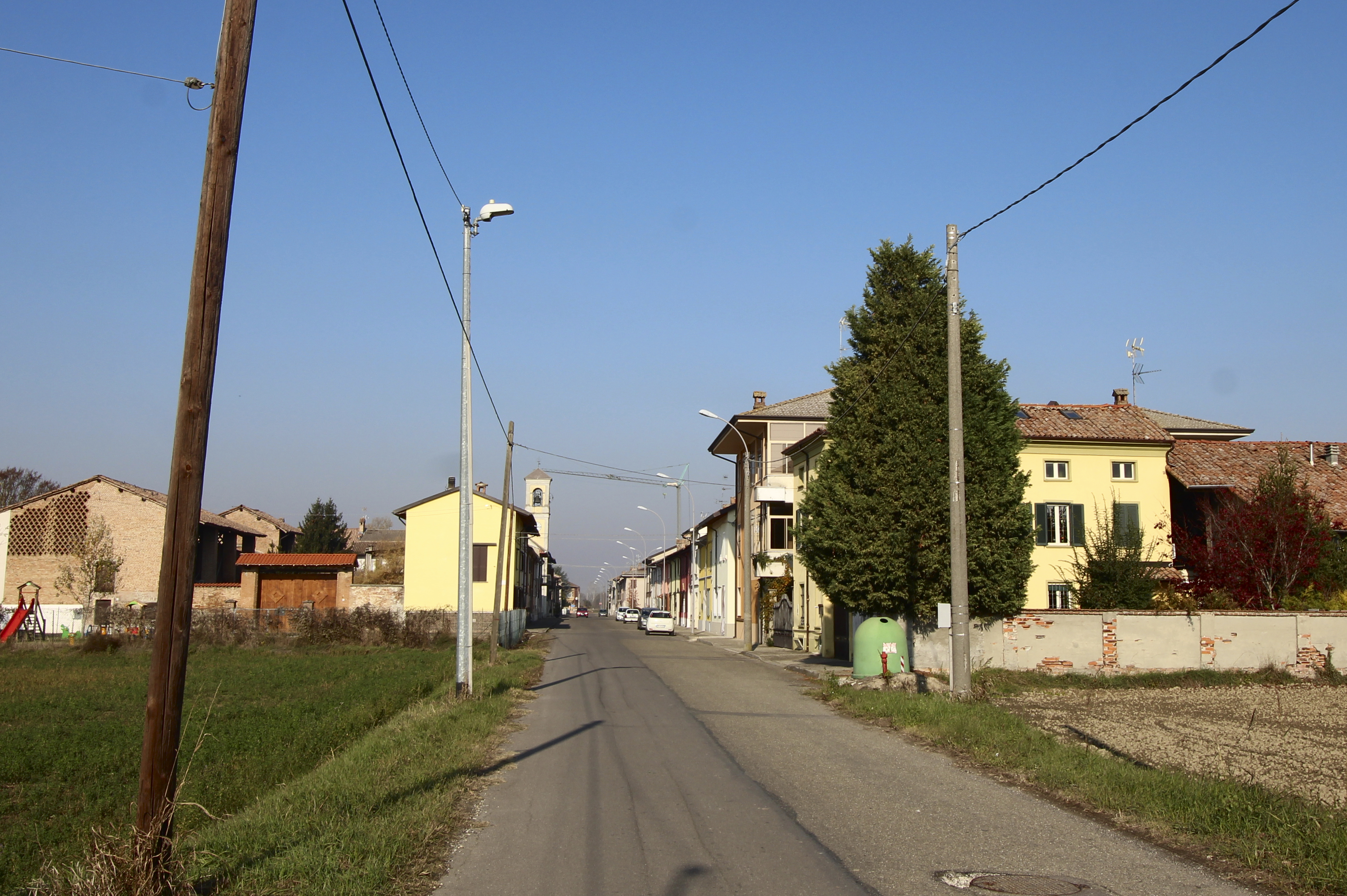
- View of Bastida de' Dossi

- Coat of arms

- Location within Italy Location within Lombardy
- Coordinates: 45°0′N 8°56′E
- Country: Italy
- Region: Lombardy
- Province: Pavia (PV)

Government
  - Mayor: Stefano Cassola

Area
  - Total: 1.7 km^{2} (0.66 sq mi)
- Elevation: 77 m (253 ft)

Population (31 July 2010)
  - Total: 178
  - Density: 100/km^{2} (270/sq mi)
- Demonym: Bastidesi
- Time zone: UTC+1 (CET)
  - Summer (DST): UTC+2 (CEST)
- Postal code: 27050
- Dialing code: 0383

Bastida de' Dossi is a comune (municipality) in the Province of Pavia in the Italian region Lombardy, located about 60 kilometres (37 mi) southwest of Milan and about 25 kilometres (16 mi) southwest of Pavia. It is situated in the Oltrepò Pavese plain and the municipal territory also include a part of Lomellina.

Bastida de' Dossi borders the following municipalities: Casei Gerola, Corana, Cornale, Mezzana Bigli, Sannazzaro de' Burgondi, Silvano Pietra.

It was the site of a royal property at least from the reign of Lambert (896), who granted it to his mother, Ageltrude. It was bequeathed by Queen Adelaide to the monastery of the Saviour at Pavia in 999, but it was still probably regarded as owing service to the crown as late as the 12th century, when it is probably one of the "great appurtenances" of Corana mentioned in the Tafelgüterverzeichnis.
