= Garlasco =

- Comune
- Comune di Garlasco
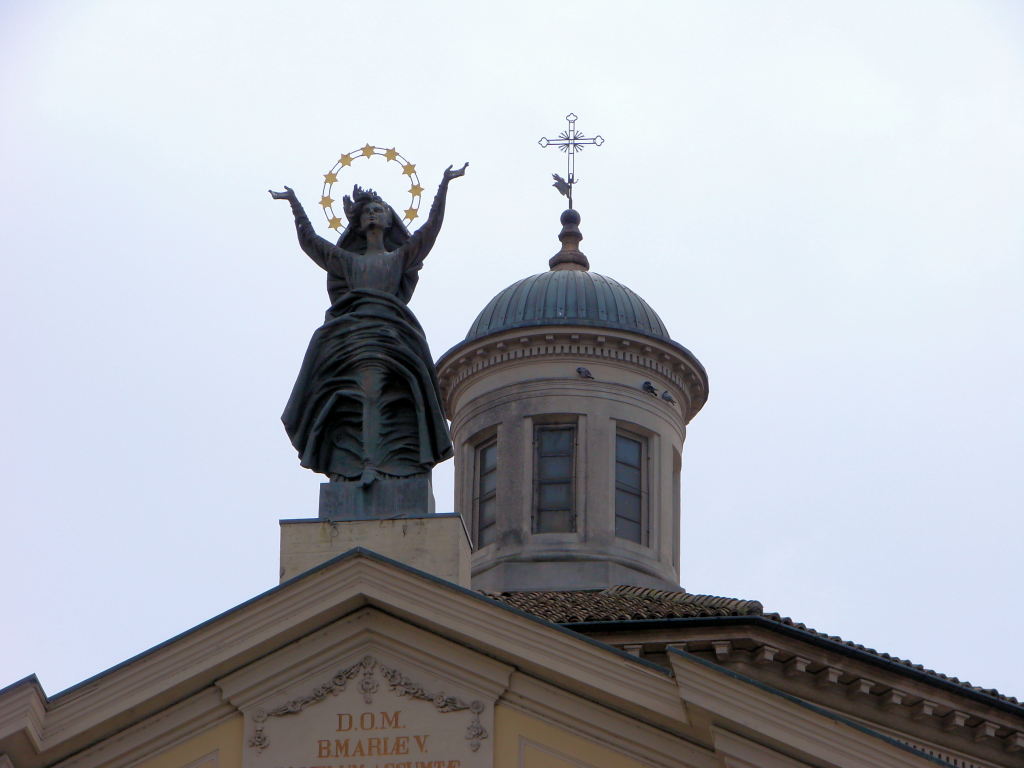

- Location within Italy Location within Lombardy
- Coordinates: 45°12′N 8°55′E
- Country: Italy
- Region: Lombardy
- Province: Province of Pavia (PV)
- Frazioni: Bozzola

Government
  - Mayor: Simone Molinari

Area
  - Total: 39.0 km^{2} (15.1 sq mi)
- Elevation: 93 m (305 ft)

Population (Dec. 2004)
  - Total: 9,343
  - Density: 240/km^{2} (620/sq mi)
- Demonym: Garlaschesi
- Time zone: UTC+1 (CET)
  - Summer (DST): UTC+2 (CEST)
- Postal code: 27026
- Dialing code: 0382
- Website: Official website

Garlasco is a comune (municipality) in the Province of Pavia in the Italian region Lombardy, located about 35 kilometres (22 mi) southwest of Milan and about 20 kilometres (12 mi) west of Pavia. As of 31 December 2004, it had a population of 9,343 and an area of 39.0 square kilometres (15.1 mi^{2}).

The municipality of Garlasco contains the frazione (subdivision) Bozzola.

Garlasco borders the following municipalities: Alagna, Borgo San Siro, Dorno, Gropello Cairoli, Tromello, Zerbolò.

== Demographic evolution ==
Historical population

Year	Pop.	±%
1861	6,602	—
1871	6,885	+4.3%
1881	7,402	+7.5%
1901	7,794	+5.3%
1911	7,965	+2.2%

Year	Pop.	±%
1921	7,414	−6.9%
1931	7,354	−0.8%
1936	7,622	+3.6%
1951	7,933	+4.1%
1961	8,958	+12.9%

Year	Pop.	±%
1971	10,042	+12.1%
1981	10,173	+1.3%
1991	9,572	−5.9%
2001	9,207	−3.8%

Source: Data from ISTAT

== Notable people ==
- Guglielmo Cappa
- Luciano Molinari
- Francesco Sampietro
- Alessandro Vaccaneo
