= Alsan =

Alsan may refer to:

== People ==
- Alsan Sanda (born 1992), Indonesian football player
- Gökhan Alsan (born 1990), Turkish football player
- Marcella Alsan (born 1977), American Physician/Economist

== Places ==
- Alsan, also known as Alzano Scrivia, Italy
