= Sampietro =

Sampietro is a surname. Notable people with the surname include:

- Antonio Sampietro (born 1949), Spanish politician
- Francesco Sampietro (1815–1896), Italian painter
- Gianluca Sampietro (born 1993), Italian footballer
- Ines Isabella Sampietro, known as Isa Miranda, Italian actress
- Mercedes Sampietro (born 1947), Spanish actress
- Pere Joan Pons Sampietro, Spanish politician
