= Zerbolò =

- Comune
- Comune di Zerbolò
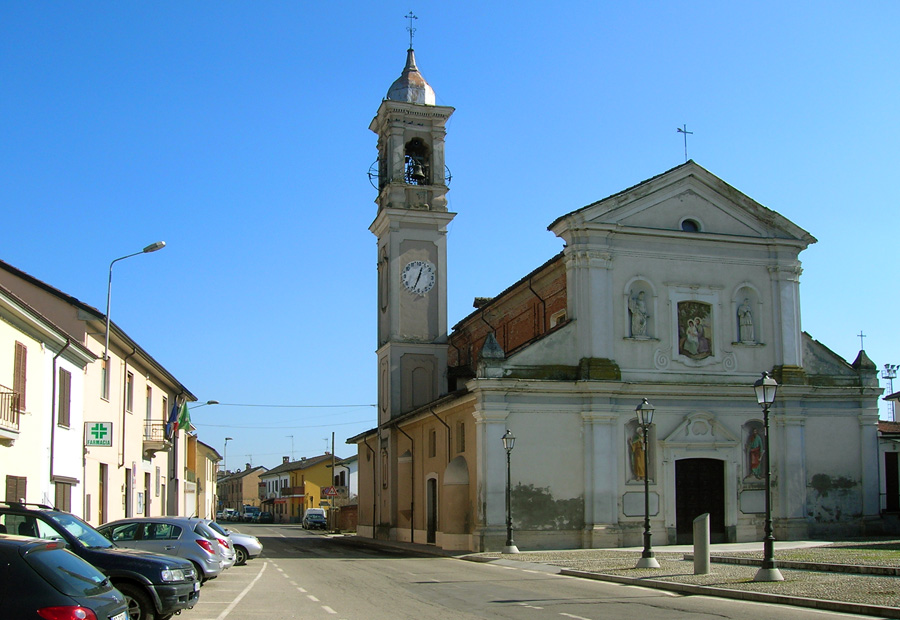

- Location within Italy Location within Lombardy
- Coordinates: 45°12′N 9°1′E
- Country: Italy
- Region: Lombardy
- Province: Pavia (PV)

Government
  - Mayor: Antonio Centenara

Area
  - Total: 37.19 km^{2} (14.36 sq mi)
- Elevation: 68 m (223 ft)

Population (31 December 2021)
  - Total: 1,635
  - Density: 43.96/km^{2} (113.9/sq mi)
- Demonym: Zerbolesi
- Time zone: UTC+1 (CET)
  - Summer (DST): UTC+2 (CEST)
- Postal code: 27020
- Dialing code: 0382
- Website: Official website

Zerbolò is a comune (municipality) in the Province of Pavia in the Italian region Lombardy, located about 30 km southwest of Milan and about 11 km west of Pavia.

Zerbolò borders the following municipalities: Bereguardo, Borgo San Siro, Carbonara al Ticino, Garlasco, Gropello Cairoli, Torre d'Isola, Villanova d'Ardenghi.

== Demographic evolution ==
Historical population

Year	Pop.	±%
1861	1,903	—
1871	1,978	+3.9%
1881	2,159	+9.2%
1901	2,527	+17.0%
1911	2,468	−2.3%
1921	2,448	−0.8%
1931	2,116	−13.6%
1936	2,239	+5.8%

Year	Pop.	±%
1951	2,409	+7.6%
1961	1,913	−20.6%
1971	1,450	−24.2%
1981	1,240	−14.5%
1991	1,203	−3.0%
2001	1,216	+1.1%
2021	1,635	+34.5%
