= Casei Gerola =

- Comune
- Comune di Casei Gerola
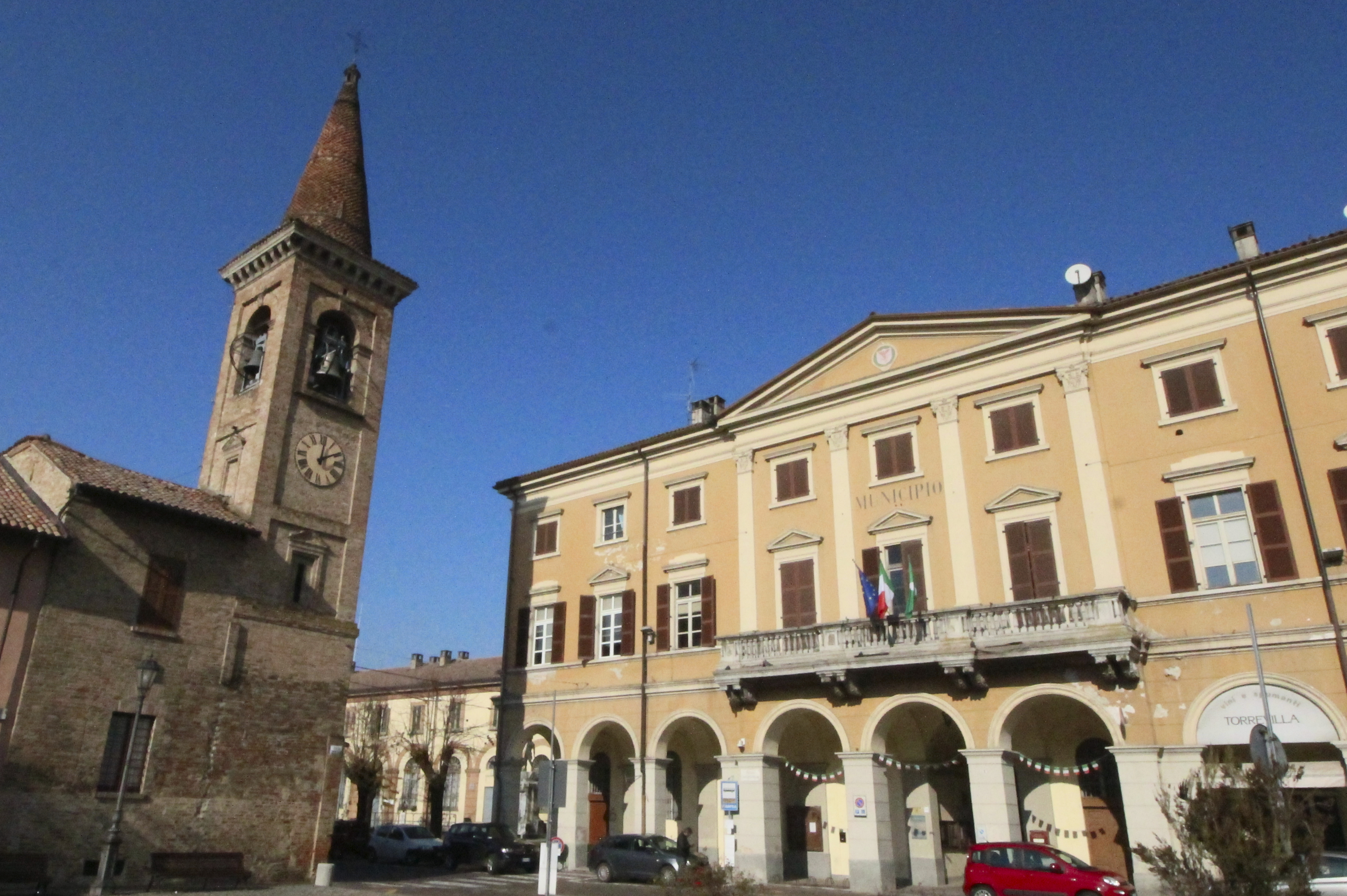

- Location within Italy Location within Lombardy
- Coordinates: 45°0′N 8°56′E
- Country: Italy
- Region: Lombardy
- Province: Pavia (PV)
- Frazioni: Gerola

Government
  - Mayor: Ezio Stella

Area
  - Total: 24.8 km^{2} (9.6 sq mi)
- Elevation: 81 m (266 ft)

Population (May. 2012)
  - Total: 2,520
  - Density: 102/km^{2} (263/sq mi)
- Demonym: Casellesi
- Time zone: UTC+1 (CET)
  - Summer (DST): UTC+2 (CEST)
- Postal code: 27050
- Dialing code: 0383
- Website: www.comune.caseigerola.pv.it

Casei Gerola is a comune (municipality) in the Province of Pavia, Lombardy, Italy. It is located about 60 kilometres (37 mi) southwest of Milan and about 25 kilometres (16 mi) southwest of Pavia.

Casei Gerola borders the following municipalities: Castelnuovo Scrivia, Cornale e Bastida, Isola Sant'Antonio, Mezzana Bigli, Molino dei Torti, Pontecurone, Silvano Pietra, Voghera.

It was part of the Counties of Guastalla and, later, county of Montechiarugolo, both ruled by the Torelli family, until 1612. It remained to the Torelli until 1797.

== Demographic evolution ==
Historical population

| Year | Pop. | ±% |
|---|---|---|
| 1861 | 2,164 | — |
| 1871 | 2,126 | −1.8% |
| 1881 | 2,013 | −5.3% |
| 1901 | 2,296 | +14.1% |
| 1911 | 2,389 | +4.1% |

| Year | Pop. | ±% |
|---|---|---|
| 1921 | 2,367 | −0.9% |
| 1931 | 2,107 | −11.0% |
| 1936 | 2,074 | −1.6% |
| 1951 | 2,100 | +1.3% |
| 1961 | 2,408 | +14.7% |

| Year | Pop. | ±% |
|---|---|---|
| 1971 | 2,489 | +3.4% |
| 1981 | 2,713 | +9.0% |
| 1991 | 2,619 | −3.5% |
| 2001 | 2,536 | −3.2% |
| 2011 | 2,547 | +0.4% |

Source: Data from ISTAT
