= Sale, Piedmont =

Sale
- Comune
- Comune di Sale
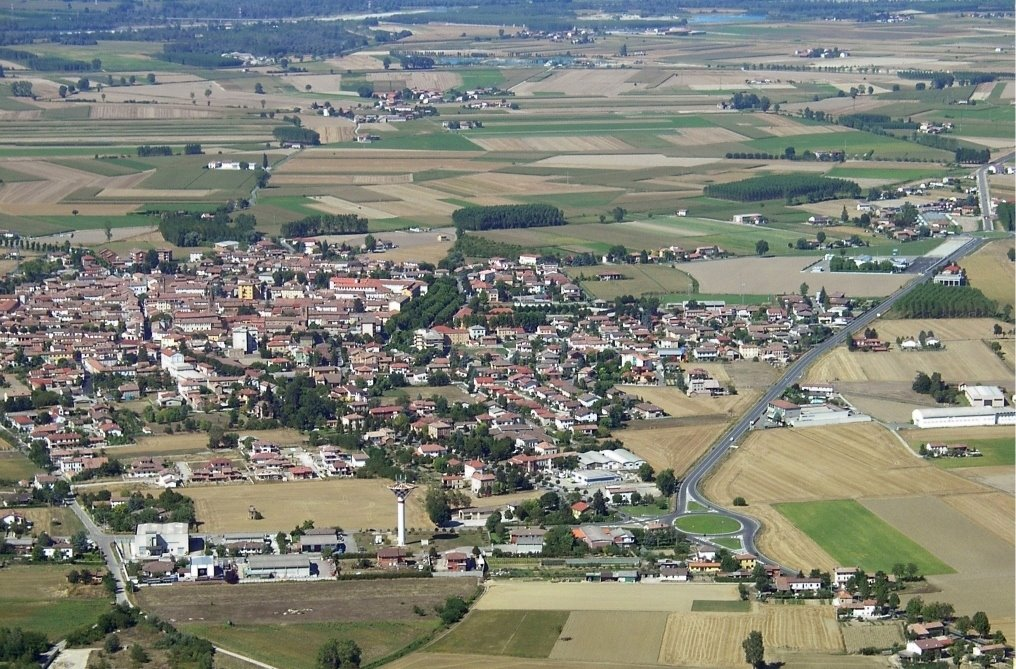

- Location within Italy Location within Piedmont
- Coordinates: 44°58′N 8°48′E
- Country: Italy
- Region: Piedmont
- Province: Alessandria (AL)

Government
  - Mayor: Enrico Santi

Area
  - Total: 44.92 km^{2} (17.34 sq mi)
- Elevation: 83 m (272 ft)

Population (30 November 2017)
  - Total: 4,083
  - Density: 90.89/km^{2} (235.4/sq mi)
- Demonym: Salesi
- Time zone: UTC+1 (CET)
  - Summer (DST): UTC+2 (CEST)
- Postal code: 15045
- Dialing code: 0131
- Website: Official website

Sale is a comune (municipality) in the Province of Alessandria in the Italian region Piedmont, located about 90 kilometres (56 mi) east of Turin and about 15 kilometres (9 mi) northeast of Alessandria.

Sale borders the following municipalities: Alessandria, Alluvioni Piovera, Castelnuovo Scrivia, Guazzora, Isola Sant'Antonio, Tortona.
