= Alzano =

Alzano may refer to the following places in Italy:

- Alzano Lombardo, in the province of Bergamo
- Alzano Scrivia, in the province of Alessandria
