= Molino dei Torti =

- Comune
- Comune di Molino dei Torti
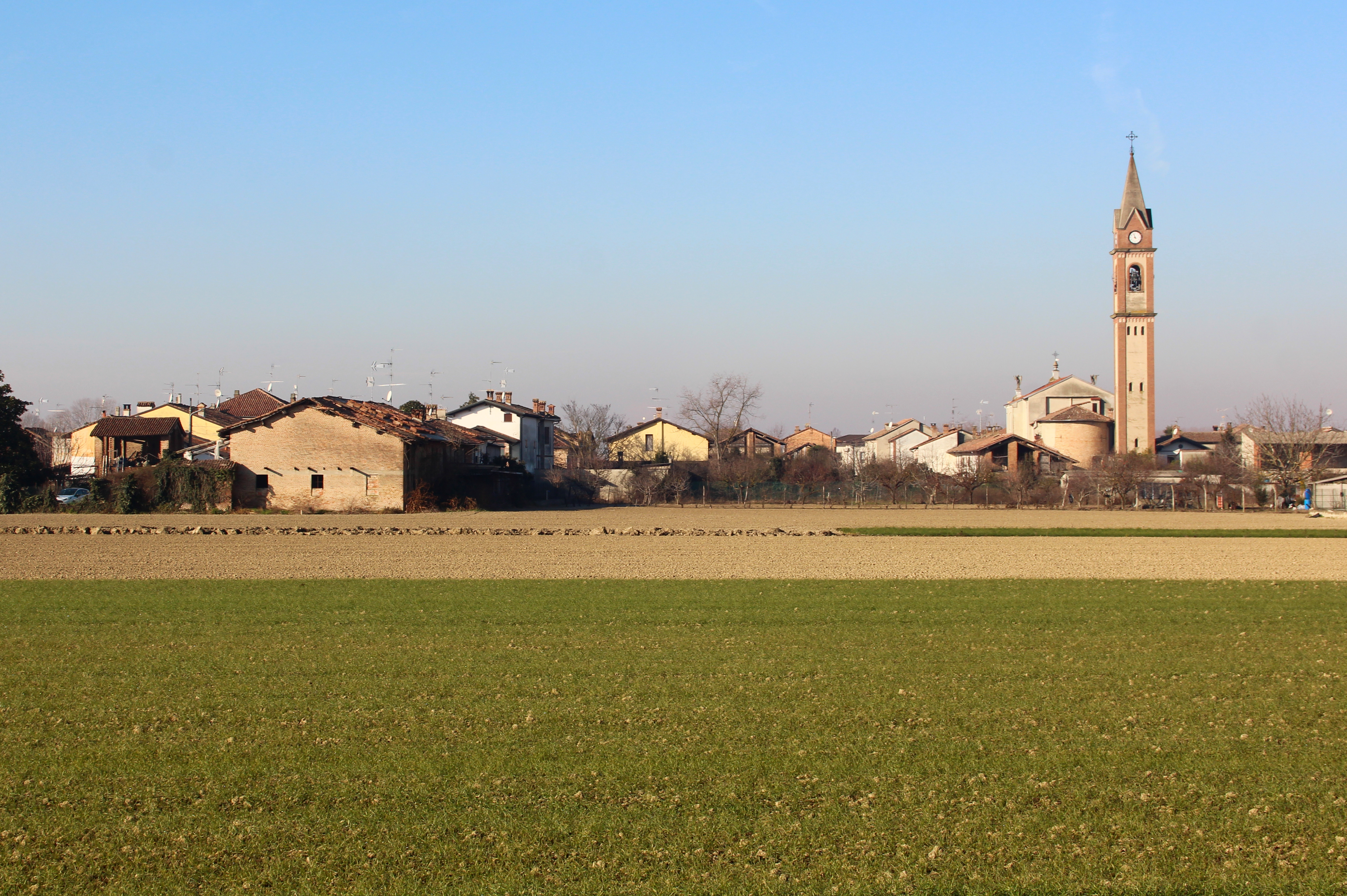

- Location within Italy Location within Piedmont
- Coordinates: 45°1′N 8°53′E
- Country: Italy
- Region: Piedmont
- Province: Province of Alessandria (AL)

Area
  - Total: 2.7 km^{2} (1.0 sq mi)
- Elevation: 76 m (249 ft)

Population (Dec. 2004)
  - Total: 685
  - Density: 250/km^{2} (660/sq mi)
- Demonym: Molinesi
- Time zone: UTC+1 (CET)
  - Summer (DST): UTC+2 (CEST)
- Postal code: 15050
- Dialing code: 0131

Molino dei Torti is a comune (municipality) in the Province of Alessandria in the Italian region Piedmont, located about 90 kilometres (56 mi) east of Turin and about 25 kilometres (16 mi) northeast of Alessandria. As of 31 December 2004, it had a population of 685 and an area of 2.7 square kilometres (1.0 mi^{2}). Molino dei Torti borders the following municipalities: Alzano Scrivia, Casei Gerola, Castelnuovo Scrivia, Guazzora, and Isola Sant'Antonio.

== Demographic evolution ==
Historical population

Year	Pop.	±%
1861	921	—
1871	997	+8.3%
1881	1,056	+5.9%
1901	1,161	+9.9%
1911	1,191	+2.6%

Year	Pop.	±%
1921	1,171	−1.7%
1931	1,021	−12.8%
1936	982	−3.8%
1951	907	−7.6%
1961	891	−1.8%

Year	Pop.	±%
1971	950	+6.6%
1981	890	−6.3%
1991	804	−9.7%
2001	738	−8.2%

Source: Data from ISTAT
