= Dorno =

- Comune
- Comune di Dorno
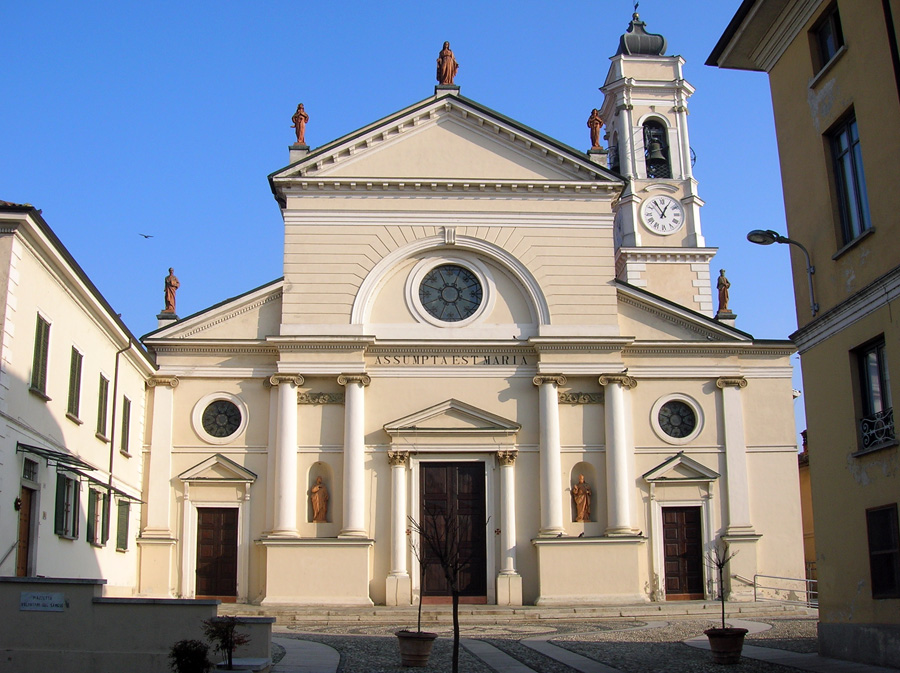

- Coat of arms

- Location within Italy Location within Lombardy
- Coordinates: 45°9′N 8°57′E
- Country: Italy
- Region: Lombardy
- Province: Province of Pavia (PV)

Area
  - Total: 30.6 km^{2} (11.8 sq mi)

Population (Dec. 2004)
  - Total: 4,415
  - Density: 144/km^{2} (374/sq mi)
- Time zone: UTC+1 (CET)
  - Summer (DST): UTC+2 (CEST)
- Postal code: 27020
- Dialing code: 0382

Dorno is a comune (municipality) in the Province of Pavia in the Italian region Lombardy, located about 40 kilometres (25 mi) southwest of Milan and about 15 kilometres (9 mi) west of Pavia. As of 31 December 2004, it had a population of 4,415 and an area of 30.6 square kilometres (11.8 mi^{2}).

Dorno borders the following municipalities: Alagna, Garlasco, Gropello Cairoli, Pieve Albignola, Sannazzaro de' Burgondi, Scaldasole, Valeggio, Zinasco.

== Demographic evolution ==
Historical population

Year	Pop.	±%
1861	4,066	—
1871	4,393	+8.0%
1881	4,737	+7.8%
1901	5,084	+7.3%
1911	5,046	−0.7%

Year	Pop.	±%
1921	4,873	−3.4%
1931	4,350	−10.7%
1936	4,150	−4.6%
1951	4,029	−2.9%
1961	4,058	+0.7%

Year	Pop.	±%
1971	4,012	−1.1%
1981	4,142	+3.2%
1991	4,084	−1.4%
2001	4,184	+2.4%

Source: Data from ISTAT

== Notable people ==
- Ron (singer-songwriter musician) (1953–)
