= Alagna (disambiguation) =

Alagna is a commune (municipality) in the Province of Pavia in the Italian region Lombardy.

Alagna may also refer to:

- Alagna Valsesia, a comune and small village high in the Valsesia alpine valley in the province of Vercelli, Piedmont
- Roberto Alagna, a French tenor
