= Silvano Pietra =

- Comune
- Comune di Silvano Pietra
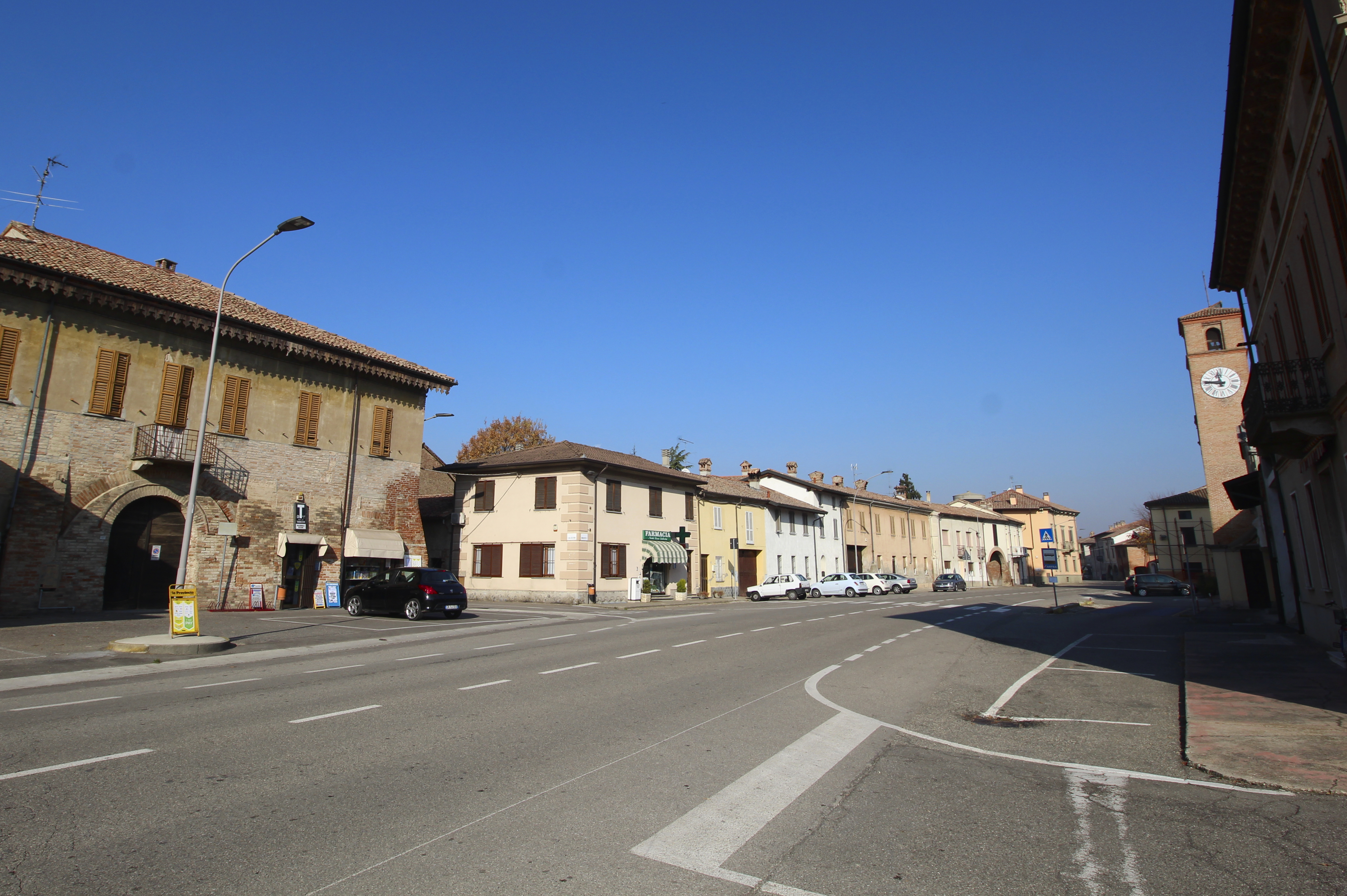

- Location within Italy Location within Lombardy
- Coordinates: 45°2′N 8°57′E
- Country: Italy
- Region: Lombardy
- Province: Province of Pavia (PV)

Area
  - Total: 13.8 km^{2} (5.3 sq mi)

Population (Dec. 2004)
  - Total: 723
  - Density: 52.4/km^{2} (136/sq mi)
- Time zone: UTC+1 (CET)
  - Summer (DST): UTC+2 (CEST)
- Postal code: 27050
- Dialing code: 0383

Silvano Pietra is a comune (municipality) in the Province of Pavia in the Italian region Lombardy, located about 50 km (31 mi) southwest of Milan and about 25 km (16 mi) southwest of Pavia. As of 31 December 2004, it had a population of 723 and an area of 13.8 km^{2} (5.3 sq mi).

Silvano Pietra borders the following municipalities: Bastida de' Dossi, Casei Gerola, Corana, Mezzana Bigli, Sannazzaro de' Burgondi, Voghera.

It was the site of a royal property at least from the reign of Lambert (896), who granted it to his mother, Ageltrude. It was bequeathed by Queen Adelaide to the monastery of the Saviour at Pavia in 999, but it was still probably regarded as owing service to the crown as late as the 12th century, when it is probably one of the "great appurtenances" of Corana mentioned in the Tafelgüterverzeichnis.

== Demographic evolution ==
Historical population

Year	Pop.	±%
1861	1,085	—
1871	1,249	+15.1%
1881	1,221	−2.2%
1901	1,251	+2.5%
1911	1,284	+2.6%

Year	Pop.	±%
1921	1,135	−11.6%
1931	1,040	−8.4%
1936	979	−5.9%
1951	974	−0.5%
1961	901	−7.5%

Year	Pop.	±%
1971	751	−16.6%
1981	716	−4.7%
1991	683	−4.6%
2001	703	+2.9%

Source: Data from ISTAT
