= Cornale =

- Comune
- Comune di Cornale
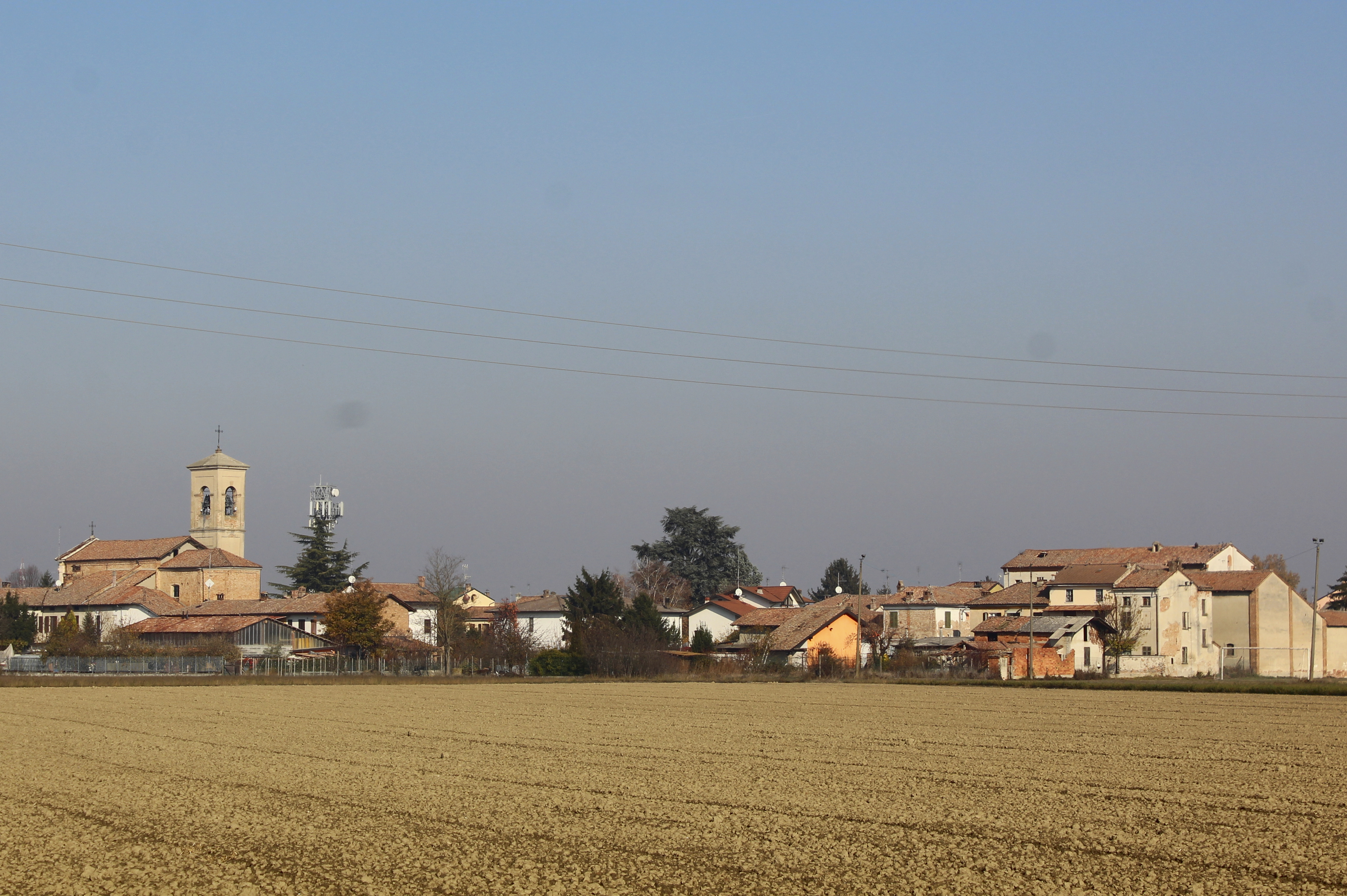

- Location within Italy Location within Lombardy
- Coordinates: 45°3′N 8°55′E
- Country: Italy
- Region: Lombardy
- Province: Province of Pavia (PV)

Area
  - Total: 1.7 km^{2} (0.66 sq mi)

Population (Dec. 2004)
  - Total: 732
  - Density: 430/km^{2} (1,100/sq mi)
- Time zone: UTC+1 (CET)
  - Summer (DST): UTC+2 (CEST)
- Postal code: 27050
- Dialing code: 0383

Cornale is a comune (municipality) in the Province of Pavia in the Italian region Lombardy, located about 50 km (31 mi) southwest of Milan and about 25 km (16 mi) southwest of Pavia. As of 31 December 2004, it had a population of 732 and an area of 1.7 km^{2} (0.66 sq mi).

Cornale borders the following municipalities: Bastida de' Dossi, Casei Gerola, Isola Sant'Antonio, Mezzana Bigli.

== Demographic evolution ==
Historical population

Year	Pop.	±%
1861	1,086	—
1871	1,155	+6.4%
1881	1,146	−0.8%
1901	1,249	+9.0%
1911	1,267	+1.4%

Year	Pop.	±%
1921	1,268	+0.1%
1931	1,149	−9.4%
1936	1,157	+0.7%
1951	1,066	−7.9%
1961	986	−7.5%

Year	Pop.	±%
1971	901	−8.6%
1981	833	−7.5%
1991	724	−13.1%
2001	734	+1.4%

Source: Data from ISTAT
