= Villanova d'Ardenghi =

- Comune
- Comune di Villanova d'Ardenghi
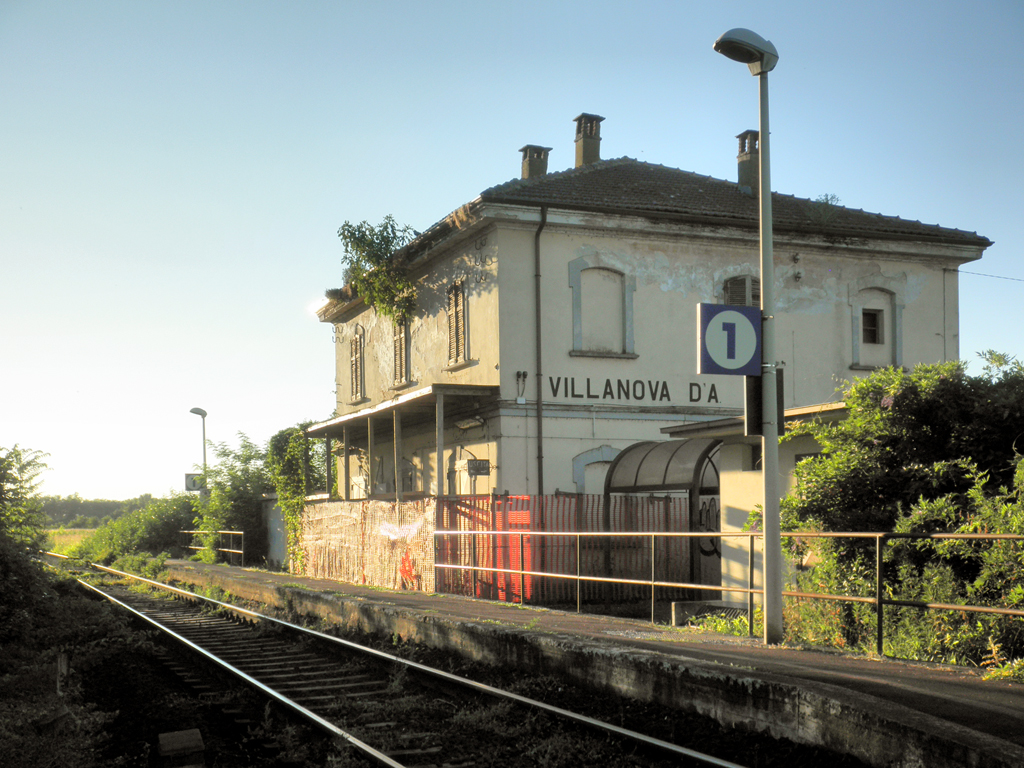

- Location within Italy Location within Lombardy
- Coordinates: 45°10′N 9°2′E
- Country: Italy
- Region: Lombardy
- Province: Province of Pavia (PV)

Area
  - Total: 6.8 km^{2} (2.6 sq mi)

Population (Dec. 2004)
  - Total: 711
  - Density: 100/km^{2} (270/sq mi)
- Time zone: UTC+1 (CET)
  - Summer (DST): UTC+2 (CEST)
- Postal code: 27030
- Dialing code: 0382

Villanova d'Ardenghi is a comune (municipality) in the Province of Pavia in the Italian region Lombardy, located about 35 km (22 mi) southwest of Milan and about 9 km (5.6 mi) west of Pavia. As of 31 December 2004, it had a population of 711 and an area of 6.8 km^{2} (2.6 sq mi).

Villanova d'Ardenghi borders the following municipalities: Carbonara al Ticino, Gropello Cairoli, Zerbolò, Zinasco.

== Demographic evolution ==
Historical population

Year	Pop.	±%
1861	631	—
1871	679	+7.6%
1881	787	+15.9%
1901	869	+10.4%
1911	907	+4.4%

Year	Pop.	±%
1921	920	+1.4%
1931	842	−8.5%
1936	835	−0.8%
1951	837	+0.2%
1961	788	−5.9%

Year	Pop.	±%
1971	772	−2.0%
1981	729	−5.6%
1991	683	−6.3%
2001	687	+0.6%

Source: Data from ISTAT
