= Valeggio =

Valeggio is the name of two Italian villages:

- Valeggio, Lombardy in the province of Pavia
- Valeggio sul Mincio in the province of Verona
