= Sannazzaro de' Burgondi =

- Comune
- Comune di Sannazzaro de' Burgondi
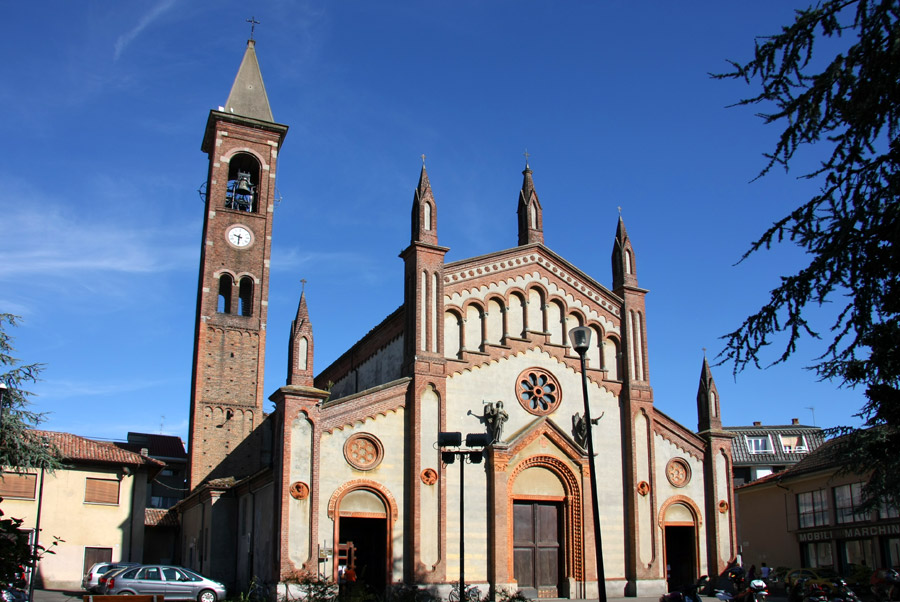
- Parish church of Sts. Nazarius and Celsus.

- Coat of arms

- Location within Italy Location within Lombardy
- Coordinates: 45°6′N 8°54′E
- Country: Italy
- Region: Lombardy
- Province: Pavia (PV)
- Frazioni: Buscarella, Mezzano, Savasini

Government
  - Mayor: Roberto Zucca

Area
  - Total: 23.33 km^{2} (9.01 sq mi)
- Elevation: 87 m (285 ft)

Population (31 December 2021)
  - Total: 5,124
  - Density: 219.6/km^{2} (568.8/sq mi)
- Demonym: Sannazzaresi
- Time zone: UTC+1 (CET)
  - Summer (DST): UTC+2 (CEST)
- Postal code: 27039
- Dialing code: 0382
- Website: Official website

Sannazzaro de' Burgondi is a comune (municipality) in the Province of Pavia in the Italian region Lombardy, located about 45 km southwest of Milan and about 20 km southwest of Pavia, in Lomellina, on the Agogna River.

Sannazzaro de' Burgondi borders the following municipalities: Corana, Cornale e Bastida, Dorno, Ferrera Erbognone, Mezzana Bigli, Pieve Albignola, Scaldasole, Silvano Pietra.

It is the ancestral home of the Sannazzaro family, who later extended their rule to the Oltrepò Pavese and Montferrat. In 1466 Giacomo Malaspina, lord of Massa, became the lord of Sannazzaro; his son Francesco founded the lines of the marquesses of Sannazzaro, which lasted until the abolition of feudalism by the Napoleonic invasion of Italy in 1797. Sannazzaro was part of Savoy from 1713, and, after its annexation to the unified Italy in 1859, received its current name in 1863.

Sannazzaro, whose economy was once based on the production of tools (wooden and metal screws), is home to one of the largest refineries in Italy, owned by ENI.

== Twin towns ==
- Százhalombatta, Hungary
