= Stradella =

Stradella may refer to:

== Places in Italy ==
Municipalities (comuni)

- Stradella, Lombardy, in the Province of Pavia

Civil parishes (frazioni)

- Stradella (Bigarello), in the commune of Bigarello, Province of Mantua, Lombardy
- Stradella (Collecchio), in the commune of Collecchio, Province of Parma, Emilia-Romagna
- Stradella (Gambolò), in the commune of Gambolò, Province of Pavia, Lombardy
- Stradella (Refrancore), in the commune of Refrancore, Province of Asti, Piedmont
- Stradella (San Polo d'Enza), in the commune of San Polo d'Enza, Province of Reggio Emilia, Emilia-Romagna

== People ==
- Alessandro Stradella (1639-1682), Italian composer

== Other uses ==
- Stradella (Niedermeyer), an 1837 opera by Louis Niedermeyer
- Stradella (Franck), an 1841 opera by César Franck
- Alessandro Stradella (opera), an 1844 opera by Friedrich von Flotow
- Stradella bass system, a keyboard system used on the bass side of many accordions
