= Capuchin Church, Vigevano =

Church in Vigevano, Italy

Coordinates: 45°18′37″N 8°51′12″E

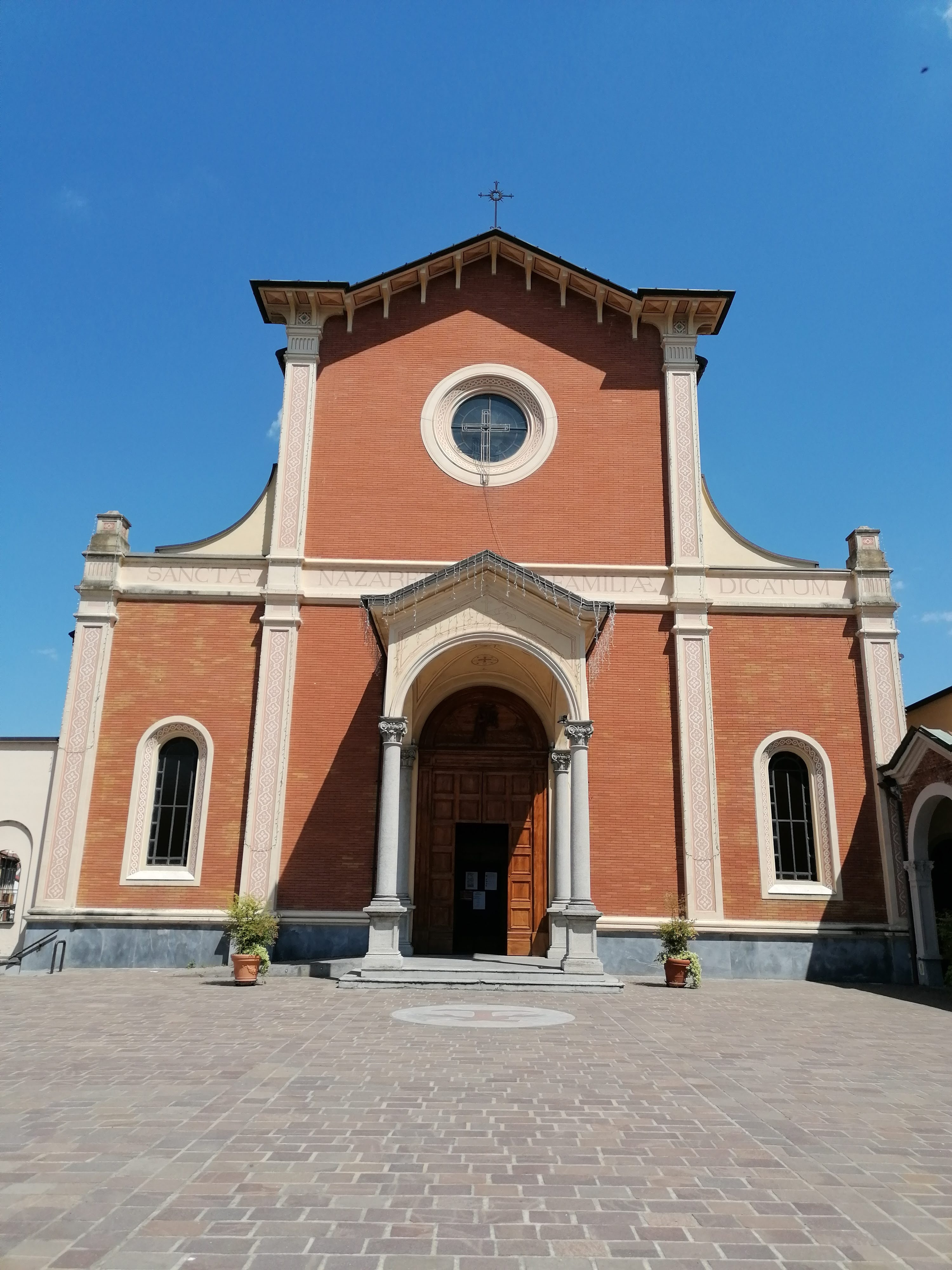
The church

The Capuchin Church is a religious building located in Vigevano, in province of Pavia and diocese of Vigevano, Italy.

== Description and story ==
In 1896, the Diocese of Vigevano purchased villa del Mombello. Initially, the small church of the Holy Family, located in via Bretti, was built.

The current church, with a façade on Corso Genova, was designed and built between 1926 and 1927 after the partial demolition of the pre-existing one, which was now inadequate due to its small dimensions.

The church appears rather bare, but suggestive in its simplicity. The frescoes are recent, repainted after a fire in 1941 which seriously damaged the 1927 originals. The authors were Luigi Brusatori and Francesco Mazzucchi; the latter dedicated himself in particular to the altarpiece on the main altar dedicated to the Holy Family and to the large fresco of the Madonna of the Angels at the back of the church, above the entrance portal. Another relevant subject are the four wooden side altars from the old convent of Serravalle Scrivia: these enclose Grotta Lourdiana, the statue of St. Francis and the paintings of St. Veronica Giuliani and St. Anthony of Padua; the latter is the work of Giacinto Gimignani and comes from the Serravalle convent.

Outside, the front of the church door, in the shape of a crescent, represents Saint Francis embracing the Crucifix, a wooden work by the sculptor Carlo Farinone of Varallo Sesia and a gift from Don Pompeo Carreri of Alagna, as the inscription recalls.
