= Guazzora =

- Comune
- Comune di Guazzora
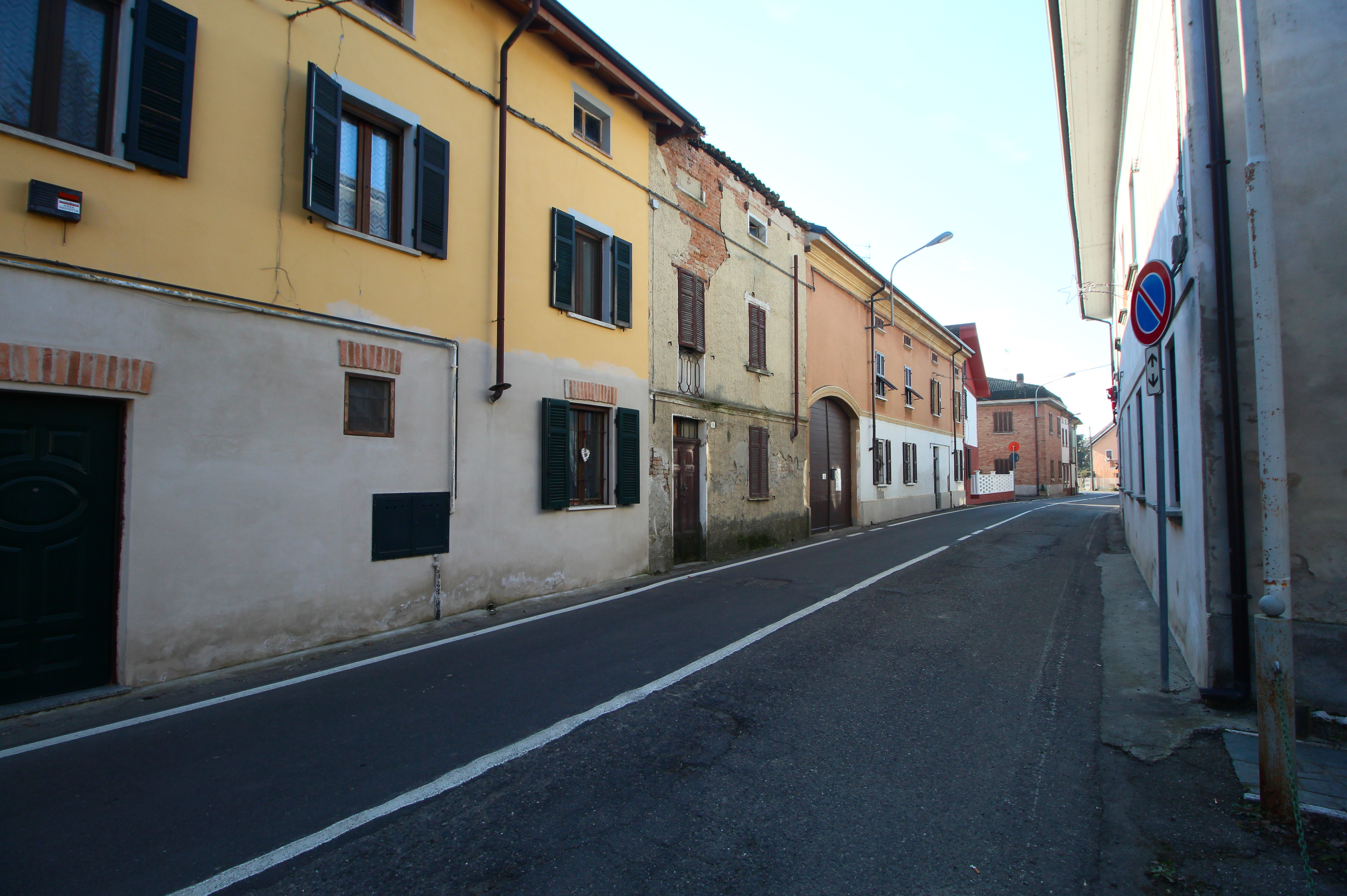

- Location within Italy Location within Piedmont
- Coordinates: 45°1′N 8°51′E
- Country: Italy
- Region: Piedmont
- Province: Province of Alessandria (AL)

Area
  - Total: 2.9 km^{2} (1.1 sq mi)

Population (Dec. 2004)
  - Total: 311
  - Density: 110/km^{2} (280/sq mi)
- Time zone: UTC+1 (CET)
  - Summer (DST): UTC+2 (CEST)
- Postal code: 15050
- Dialing code: 0131

Guazzora is a comune (municipality) in the Province of Alessandria in the Italian region Piedmont, located about 90 kilometres (56 mi) east of Turin and about 20 kilometres (12 mi) northeast of Alessandria. As of 31 December 2004, it had a population of 311 and an area of 2.9 square kilometres (1.1 mi^{2}).

Guazzora borders the following municipalities: Alzano Scrivia, Castelnuovo Scrivia, Isola Sant'Antonio, Molino dei Torti, and Sale.

== Demographic evolution ==
Historical population

Year	Pop.	±%
1861	667	—
1871	658	−1.3%
1881	723	+9.9%
1901	763	+5.5%
1911	682	−10.6%

Year	Pop.	±%
1921	597	−12.5%
1931	550	−7.9%
1936	554	+0.7%
1951	554	+0.0%
1961	498	−10.1%

Year	Pop.	±%
1971	419	−15.9%
1981	374	−10.7%
1991	353	−5.6%
2001	294	−16.7%

Source: Data from ISTAT
