= Corana =

- Comune
- Comune di Corana
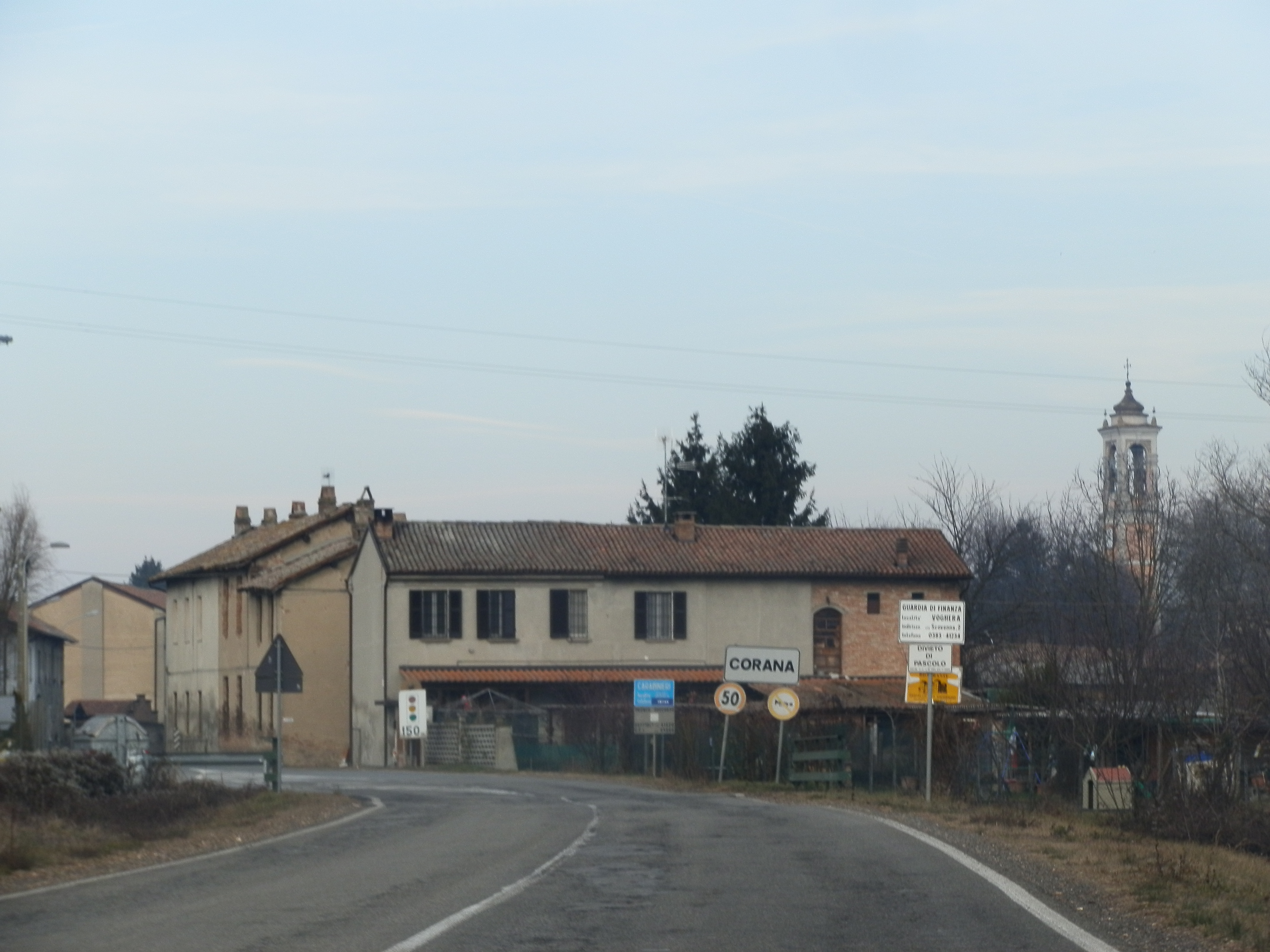

- Coat of arms

- Location within Italy Location within Lombardy
- Coordinates: 45°4′N 8°58′E
- Country: Italy
- Region: Lombardy
- Province: Pavia (PV)
- Frazioni: Ghiaie di Corana

Government
  - Mayor: Vittorio Balduzzi

Area
  - Total: 13.0 km^{2} (5.0 sq mi)
- Elevation: 71 m (233 ft)

Population (30 April 2010)
  - Total: 785
  - Density: 60.4/km^{2} (156/sq mi)
- Demonym: Coranesi
- Time zone: UTC+1 (CET)
  - Summer (DST): UTC+2 (CEST)
- Postal code: 27050
- Dialing code: 0383
- Website: Official website

Corana is a comune (municipality) in the Province of Pavia in the Italian region Lombardy, located about 45 kilometres (28 mi) southwest of Milan and about 20 kilometres (12 mi) southwest of Pavia.

Corana borders the following municipalities: Bastida de' Dossi, Cervesina, Pieve Albignola, Sannazzaro de' Burgondi, Silvano Pietra, Voghera, Zinasco.

Corana was the site of a royal estate in the 12th century, according to the Indiculus curiarum.
