= Borgo San Siro =

Borgo San Siro Bùrgh San Sir
- Comune
- Comune di Borgo San Siro
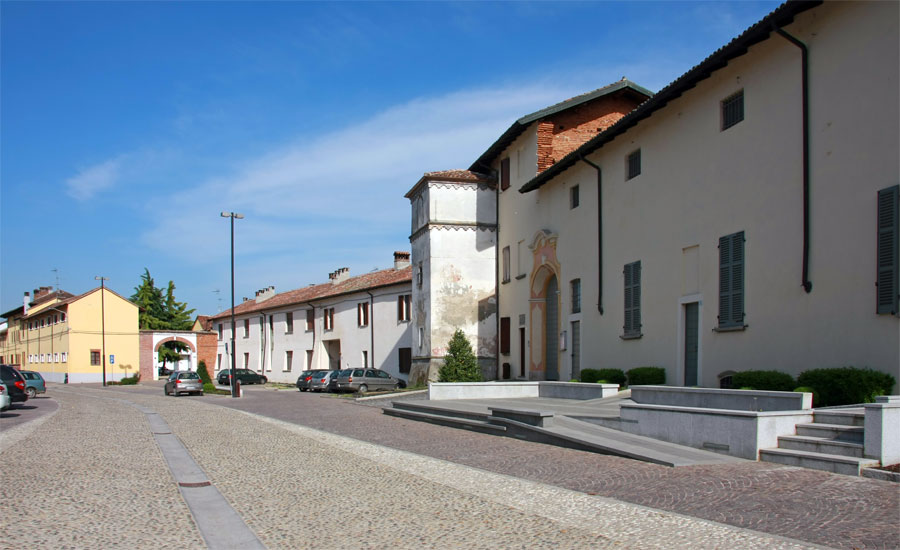
- View of Borgo San Siro

- Coat of arms

- Location within Italy Location within Lombardy
- Coordinates: 45°15′N 9°2′E
- Country: Italy
- Region: Lombardy
- Province: Pavia (PV)
- Frazioni: Torrazza

Government
  - Mayor: Antonio Ballottin

Area
  - Total: 17.64 km^{2} (6.81 sq mi)
- Elevation: 98 m (322 ft)

Population (31 December 2021)
  - Total: 953
  - Density: 54.0/km^{2} (140/sq mi)
- Demonym: Borghigiani
- Time zone: UTC+1 (CET)
  - Summer (DST): UTC+2 (CEST)
- Postal code: 27020
- Dialing code: 0382
- Website: Official website

Borgo San Siro (Western Lombard: Bùrgh San Sir) is a comune (municipality) in the Province of Pavia in the Italian region Lombardy, located about 25 kilometres (16 mi) southwest of Milan and about 12 kilometres (7 mi) northwest of Pavia, in the western Lomellina.

Borgo San Siro borders the following municipalities: Bereguardo, Gambolò, Garlasco, Tromello, Vigevano, Zerbolò.
