= Tafelgüterverzeichnis =

Register of the king's income in medieval Germany

The Holy Roman Empire at the time of the Tafelgüterverzeichnis

The Tafelgüterverzeichnis is a list of the "courts which belong to the table of the king of the Romans" (curie que pertinent ad mensam regis Romanorum), that is, a register of the lands belonging to the royal demesne (or fisc) and of the payments in cash or in kind which each estate owed annually. The title "king of the Romans" was the preferred official title of the medieval Kings of Germany if they had not yet been crowned Holy Roman Emperor. Besides Germany, they also ruled the kingdoms of Italy and Burgundy. The Tafelgüterverzeichnis lists lands in both Germany and Italy.

== Manuscript and date ==
The Tafelgüterverzeichnis is found, alongside ten other documents pertaining to the Kornelimünster in Aachen and dating to the last quarter of the twelfth century, in manuscript "Bonn S. 1559" in the library of the University of Bonn. It is a "draft of a letter sent by a canon of Aachen to someone of high rank in the king's entourage, perhaps his chancellor[, and] not really part of a survey policy [nor] an administrative document in the strict sense of the word." It is nevertheless the closest thing to a fiscal record of the German monarchy in the twelfth century.

The date of the Tafelgüterverzeichnis has been a matter of debate for over a century. It was probably drawn up after the first coronation of a king (as "King of the Romans") and before his imperial coronation, since the compiler is uncertain about the Italian estates: "How much they give no one can relate or find out unless we come to Lombardy." The use of the "Roman" title precludes its being earlier than the reign of Henry IV, leading to an earliest dating of 1064/5. Most commonly it is dated either to the first year (1152) of the reign of Frederick I or to the eve of his fifth visit to Italy (1173/4). It has been dated as late as 1185/9 by Wolfgang Metz, who argues that the Tafelgüterverzeichnis was compiled in three phases and only took on its final form through the work of a ministerialis, perhaps William of Aachen, under Henry VI.

== Contents ==
The curie (singular curia) of the register were royal farmlands associated with manors, castles or towns. There were 20 recorded in Saxony, 21 in "Franconia along the Rhine" (Francia circa Rhenum, including Lotharingia), 12 in Bavaria and 28 in Lombardy. The register is divided between these four regions, but while its information on the German regions is detailed and consistent, that for Lombardy is uneven. It is not a complete list of lands owned by the crown, much of which was enfeoffed, nor even a complete list of crown lands that were directly exploited by the monarchs. No lands in Swabia or Alsace are included, possibly because these had been informally attached as an appanage to the Duchy of Swabia. This would place the date of composition of the Tafelgüterverzeichnis after the election of Conrad III of the Swabian House of Hohenstaufen in 1138. On the other hand, the total number of services (servitia) owed by the Saxon estates is greater than that owed by all the other estates combined. This is best explained by dating the register to the reign of Lothair III (1125–37), who was a Saxon and whose court was dominated by Saxons. A Saxon servitium consisted of "thirty large pigs, three cows, five suckling pigs, fifty hens, fifty eggs, ninety cheeses, ten geese, five barrels of beer, five pounds of pepper, ten pounds of wax, wine from cellars all over Saxony." The servitia in the other German regions consisted of the same products in different proportions, with the Bavarian and Franconian servitia being the same. The high burden of the servitia suggests they were for the support of an army or of the royal palace year-round, but there is no indication of the period of time which a servitium was supposed to cover.

The totals of servitia owed in Saxony and Bavaria are given by the scribe as "as many days as are in year plus 40" (quot sunt dies in anno, et XL plus) and 26, respectively. Since specific service requirements are only given for two Saxon estates, and a total of 405 were owed by the 20 estates, the average number owed by the other 18 for which now specific requirement is given must be 20 servitia, a very high number, given that only one other estate in the entire register owed more than eight. Nine of the 28 Lombard estates owed cash payments totaling 5,600 marks (marcas). None of the German estates owed any. The imperial crown—and the authority in Italy that was established with it—were appealing to the German kings largely for the monetary resources that the advance economy of Lombardy provided. The Tafelgüterverzeichnis does not mention any tolls, although these were increasingly the main means of raising cash in Germany. Sixteen of the estates in the register are known to have had royal toll stations, but these are not mentioned.

The most common meat in the Tafelgüterverzeichnis is pork, although archaeological evidence suggests that beef was more common.

== Other theories ==
Caroline Göldel argues that the Tafelgüterverzeichnis is not a list of renders owed to the king and his entourage, but was drawn up in 1165 by Otto of Andechs, then provost of the Kornelimünster, in connexion with the canonisation of Charlemagne. She believes Frederick I was made a canon of Aachen at that time, and that the register records the benefices associated with this honorary canonry.

John Freed states that it was compiled in 1173 or 1174 to protect the interests of the diocese of Bamberg.

== Table ==
This table is derived from Ludwig Weiland's critical edition of 1893.

Saxony (Saxonia) — Franconia along the Rhine (Francia circa Rhenum) — Bavaria (Bawaria) — Lombardy (Lombardia)

Location	Name in Latin	Owed	Notes
Leisnig	Licendices	5 servitia regalia	
Görlitz	Melca	?	
Nossen	Nisana	?	
Bautzen	Budesin	?	
Altenburg	Altenburc	?	
Eisleben	Gisleua	?	
Allstedt	Altensteda	?	
Wolferstedt	Wulfersteda	?	
Farnstädt	Warnesteda	?	
Wallhausen	Walehusen	?	
Tilleda	Tulleda	?	The Königspfalz at Tilleda was atop the Pfingstberg hill until the Hohenstaufen period, when it was moved into the valley to accommodate its farms and marketplace.
Osterode	Ostrorobeda	?	
Werlaburgdorf	Werla	?	
Goslar	Goslaria	?	
Homburg	Hohenborc	?	
Pöhlde	Poleda	?	
Grone	Gruna	?	This estate owned a salt works (ibi pertinent salcaru regis), probably that of Salzderhelden, not that of Luisenhall.
Eschwege	Iskinwege	?	
Mühlhausen	Mulchusa	?	
Merseburg	Merseborc	40 servitia regalia	
Tiel	Tijla	2 servitia regalia	
Nijmegen	Numaca	8 servitia regalia	
Aachen	Aquisgrana	8 servitia regalia	
Compiègne?	Compendium	2 servitia regalia	
Düren	Dura	2 servitia regalia	
Remagen	Reimaia	2 servitia regalia	
Sinzig	Syncika	2 servitia regalia	
Hammerstein	Hambrestein	2 servitia regalia	
Andernach	Andernaca	2 servitia regalia	
Boppard	Bobarda	3 servitia regalia	
Nieder-Ingelheim	Ingleheim	3 servitia regalia	
Kaiserslautern	Luthera	8 servitia regalia	
Briey	Brie castrum	8 servitia regalia	
Thionville	Tydonisvilla	3 servitia regalia	
Florange	Floringia	7 servitia regalia	
Schlüchtern	Salotra	7 servitia regalia	
Surbourg?	Surie	7 servitia regalia	
Hassloch	Hasela	1 servitium regale	
Nierstein	Nerestena	1 servitium regale	
Trebur	Triburia	4 servitia regalia	
Frankfurt	Frankeneuort	3 servitia regalia	
Nuremberg	Nuremburc	2 servitia regalia	
Großgründlach?	Grenda	1 servitium regale	
Scheiblhof	Scybol	1 servitium regale	
Polting	Botinga	1 servitium regale	
Weissenburg	Wizenborc	1 servitium regale	
Burg Nürnberg	Nuremburc castrum	7 servitia regalia	
Bamberg	Hauemberc	7 servitia regalia	
Greding	Gradinga	5 servitia regalia	
Neuburg an der Donau	Nuvemburc super Danubium	2 servitia regalia	
Creussen	Crusa	3 servitia regalia	
Neumarkt	Nuerenwat	?	Described as being "with many manors" (cum multis mansis).
Dörnberg	Turenberc	2 servitia regalia	
Settimo Torinese	Septima	2 servitia regalia	
Turin	Turrin	?	Described as "his [the king's] allod" (allodium suum) without any servitia, perhaps indicating that the scribe knew no more than that a royal palace existed at Turin.
Susa	Susa	2,000 marks	
Avigliana	Auilana castrum	1,000 marks	
Piossasco	Ploszascum	500 marks	
Chieri	Cara	500 marks	
Testona	Tastusta	500 marks	
Revello	Viuel	500 marks	
Saluzzo	Saluza	200 marks	
Albenga	Albinga	200 marks	
Savona	Seduna civitas	200 marks	
Torcello (or Trofarello?)	Tarcul (or Tarvil?)	?	The three civitates (cities) of Torcello, Cavallermaggiore and Canelli gave a total of 8 servitia.
Cavallermaggiore	Caualar	?	The three civitates (cities) of Torcello, Cavallermaggiore and Canelli gave a total of 8 servitia.
Canelli	Canella	?	The three civitates (cities) of Torcello, Cavallermaggiore and Canelli gave a total of 8 servitia.
Annone	Naum	10 servitia regalia	
Rubbiano?	Rubianacum	1 servitium regale	Perhaps Ruvignano (Rugné) in Bairo, Revigliasco d'Asti, Revignano d'Asti or else a Robbiano.
San Giorgio Monferrato	Sanctum Georgium	5 servitia regalia	
Gamondio	Gamunda	4 servitia regalia	
Spinetta Marengo	Marona (or Marinca?)	8 servitia regalia	
Sezzadio	Zeca	3 servitia regalia	
Retorto	Retor	2 servitia regalia	
Pontecurone	Bijpoint (or Sypont?)	2 servitia regalia	
Basaluzzo	Basiliadus	2 servitia regalia	
Voghera?	Vigiula (or Viguila?)	?	Perhaps Vigol at Tortona. Described as a "noble court" (nobilis curia), perhaps because the compiler did not know what it owed.
Tromello?	Tronibal	?	Described as a "noble court" (nobilis curia), perhaps because the compiler did not know what it owed.
Lomello	Lombel	?	
Montiglio	Montilin	?	
Corana	Curana	?	Described as being "with great appurtenances" (cum magni appendiciis), perhaps Silvano Pietra and Bastida de' Dossi, known royal properties since the 9th century.

== Sources ==
- Arnold, Benjamin (1985). German Knighthood, 1050–1300. Clarendon Press.
- Arnold, Benjamin (1991). Princes and Territories in Medieval Germany. Cambridge University Press.
- Arnold, Benjamin (1997). Medieval Germany, 500–1300: A Political Interpretation. University of Toronto Press.
- Bordone, Renato (2011). "L'enigmatico elenco dei beni fiscali in Lombardia al tempo di Federico Barbarossa: alcune proposte interpretative" (PDF). In Bassetti, Massimiliano (ed.). Studi sul Medioevo per Andrea Castagnetti. Bologna. pp. 59–73.
- Cowdrey, H. E. J. (1998). "Review of Servitium Regis und Tafelgüterverzeichnis by Caroline Göldel". The English Historical Review. 113 (454): 1274.
- Freed, John B. (2005). "Review of Power and Property in Medieval Germany by Benjamin Arnold". History. 90 (300): 611.
- Leyser, Karl J. (1988). "Frederick Barbarossa and the Hohenstaufen Polity". Viator. 19: 153–76. doi:10.1484/j.viator.2.301368.
- Schmid, Peter (1977). Regensburg: Stadt der Konige und Herzoge im Mittelalter. Kallmünz: Laßleben.
- Weiland, Ludwig, ed. (1893). "Indiculus curiarum ad mensam regiam pertinentium (1064–1065)". Constitutiones. Monumenta Germaniae Historica. Vol. 1. Hanover. pp. 646–49.
