= Pieve Albignola =

- Comune
- Comune di Pieve Albignola
- Coat of arms

- Location within Italy Location within Lombardy
- Coordinates: 45°4′N 8°58′E
- Country: Italy
- Region: Lombardy
- Province: Pavia (PV)
- Frazioni: Cascinotto Mensa

Government
  - Mayor: Massimo Chiesa

Area
  - Total: 17.7 km^{2} (6.8 sq mi)

Population (30 April 2010)
  - Total: 934
  - Density: 52.8/km^{2} (137/sq mi)
- Demonym: Pievesi
- Time zone: UTC+1 (CET)
  - Summer (DST): UTC+2 (CEST)
- Postal code: 27030
- Dialing code: 0382
- Website: Official website

Pieve Albignola is a comune (municipality) in the Province of Pavia in the Italian region Lombardy, located about 45 km southwest of Milan and about 20 km southwest of Pavia.

Pieve Albignola borders the following municipalities: Corana, Dorno, Sannazzaro de' Burgondi, Zinasco.
