= Gambolò =

- Comune
- Comune di Gambolò
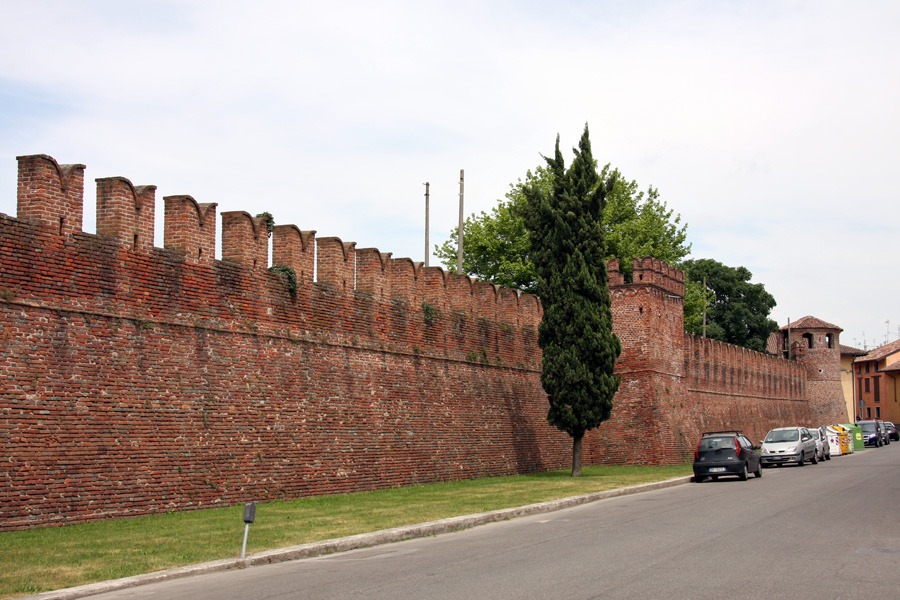
- View of the castle's walls.

- Coat of arms

- Location within Italy Location within Lombardy
- Coordinates: 45°15′N 8°52′E
- Country: Italy
- Region: Lombardy
- Province: Pavia (PV)
- Frazioni: Belcreda, Garbana, Remondò, Stradella

Government
  - Mayor: Antonio Costantino

Area
  - Total: 51.7 km^{2} (20.0 sq mi)
- Elevation: 104 m (341 ft)

Population (30 November 2021)
  - Total: 9,648
  - Density: 187/km^{2} (483/sq mi)
- Demonym: Gambolesi or Gambolini
- Time zone: UTC+1 (CET)
  - Summer (DST): UTC+2 (CEST)
- Postal code: 27025
- Dialing code: 0381
- Website: Official website

Gambolò is a comune (municipality) in the Province of Pavia in the Italian region Lombardy, located about 35 kilometres (22 miles) southwest of Milan and about 25 km (16 mi) northwest of Pavia.

Gambolò borders the following municipalities: Borgo San Siro, Mortara, Tromello, Vigevano. Sights include the Litta Castle, the parish church of Sts. Eusebius and Gaudentius (in neo-medieval style) and the Pieve of Sant'Eusebio.

== Twin towns ==
- Kyrros, Greece
- Mālpils, Latvia
