= Scaldasole =

- Comune
- Comune di Scaldasole
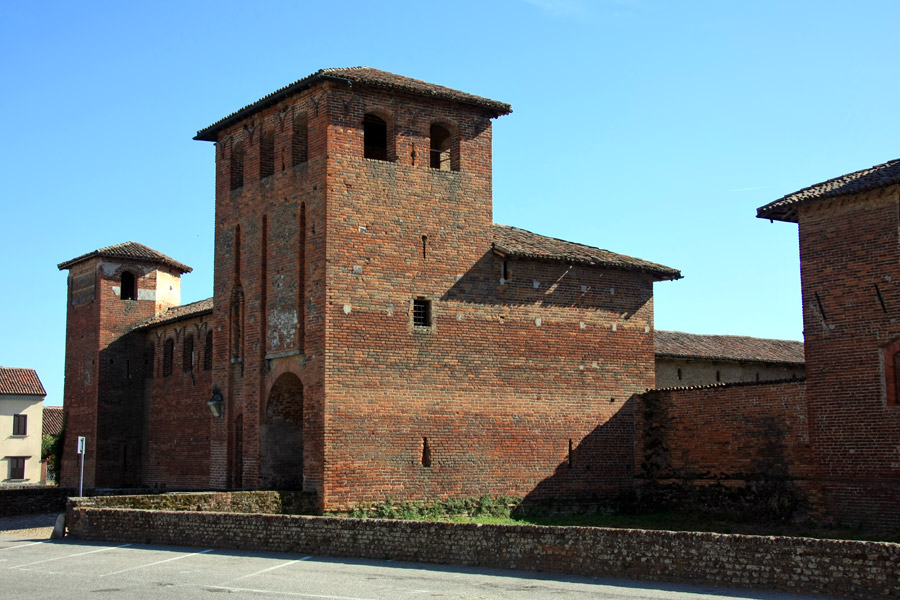

- Location within Italy Location within Lombardy
- Coordinates: 45°7′N 8°55′E
- Country: Italy
- Region: Lombardy
- Province: Province of Pavia (PV)

Area
  - Total: 11.6 km^{2} (4.5 sq mi)

Population (Dec. 2004)
  - Total: 902
  - Density: 77.8/km^{2} (201/sq mi)
- Time zone: UTC+1 (CET)
  - Summer (DST): UTC+2 (CEST)
- Postal code: 27020
- Dialing code: 0382

Scaldasole is a comune (municipality) in the Province of Pavia in the Italian region Lombardy, located about 45 km (28 mi) southwest of Milan and about 20 km (12 mi) southwest of Pavia. As of 31 December 2004, it had a population of 902 and an area of 11.6 km^{2} (4.5 sq mi).

Scaldasole borders the following municipalities: Dorno, Ferrera Erbognone, Sannazzaro de' Burgondi, Valeggio.

== Demographic evolution ==
Historical population

Year	Pop.	±%
1861	1,074	—
1871	1,192	+11.0%
1881	1,302	+9.2%
1901	1,271	−2.4%
1911	1,200	−5.6%

Year	Pop.	±%
1921	1,175	−2.1%
1931	1,084	−7.7%
1936	1,079	−0.5%
1951	1,142	+5.8%
1961	1,089	−4.6%

Year	Pop.	±%
1971	933	−14.3%
1981	887	−4.9%
1991	832	−6.2%
2001	885	+6.4%

Source: Data from ISTAT
