= Francesco Sampietro =

Italian painter (1815–1896)

Francesco Sampietro (June 2, 1815 in Garlasco, Province of Pavia, Region of Lombardy – 1896) was an Italian painter, mainly of sacred subjects.

== Biography ==
At 14 years of age, he moved to Pavia to study design with the engraver Giovita Garavaglia; but wishing to study painting, after two years he moved to Milan where he stayed 1832 to 1839. His mother supported his studies in painting, by selling all her possessions. But he was not able to complete his studies. In penury, his friends were able to sustain him till August 1839, when he finished his first large canvas: San Rocco visits those sick with the plague, which had been commissioned by a confraternity of Garlasco, and now is in the church of the same name. He also painted an altarpiece for the parish of Carbonara al Ticino.

With the patronage of the Cappà family, he was able to travel to Rome to study and work till 1843. About that year, for the widow of King Carlo Felice, Sampietro painted a portrait of her grandson, Guglielmo. For the comune di Alagna (Lomellina), he painted San Germano frees the imprisoned. The canvas of The Souls of Purgatory was commissioned by the comune of Groppello in Lomellina. In mid-1843 he traveled to Venice. There he painted an altarpiece depicting Le Anime purganti for the parish of Cilavegna.

After 16 months, Sampietro returned to Rome where he paints two large canvases for the church of Lomellina, also a San Pietro for the Confraternity of San Rocco in Garlasco, and a larger than life, San Giovanni Evangelista for a church in Carbonara al Ticino. He painted a Via Crucis for the parochial church of Garlasco. In 1849, he left Turin, and move to Rome, where he obtained a number of commissions from King Vittorio Emanuele, from the Ministry overseeing the Order of Santi Maurizio e Lazzaro, and from private commissions.

Among his many works: a Madonna for the Sanctuary of Bozzole (near Garlasco); Santi Maurizio e Lazzaro for the chapel of the Hospital of the Order of Saints Maurice and Lazarus in Lanzo; a Christ among the Children for the asylum of infants founded by signor Giovanni Antona Traversi in Sannazzaro del Burgondi; The Delirium of Ermengarda from the play Adelchi by Alessandro Manzoni; Death of Count Rosso; A Prayer at Subiaco. In 1860, Sampietro was nominated as substitute teacher for professor Enrico Gamba, teaching design of figures in the Royal Accademia Albertina of Fine Arts in Turin. In 1880, he exhibited in Turin a canvas of Pope Julius II reconciling with Michelangelo. Vittorio Cavalleri was one of his pupils.
