= Cornale e Bastida =

- Comune
- Comune di Cornale e Bastida
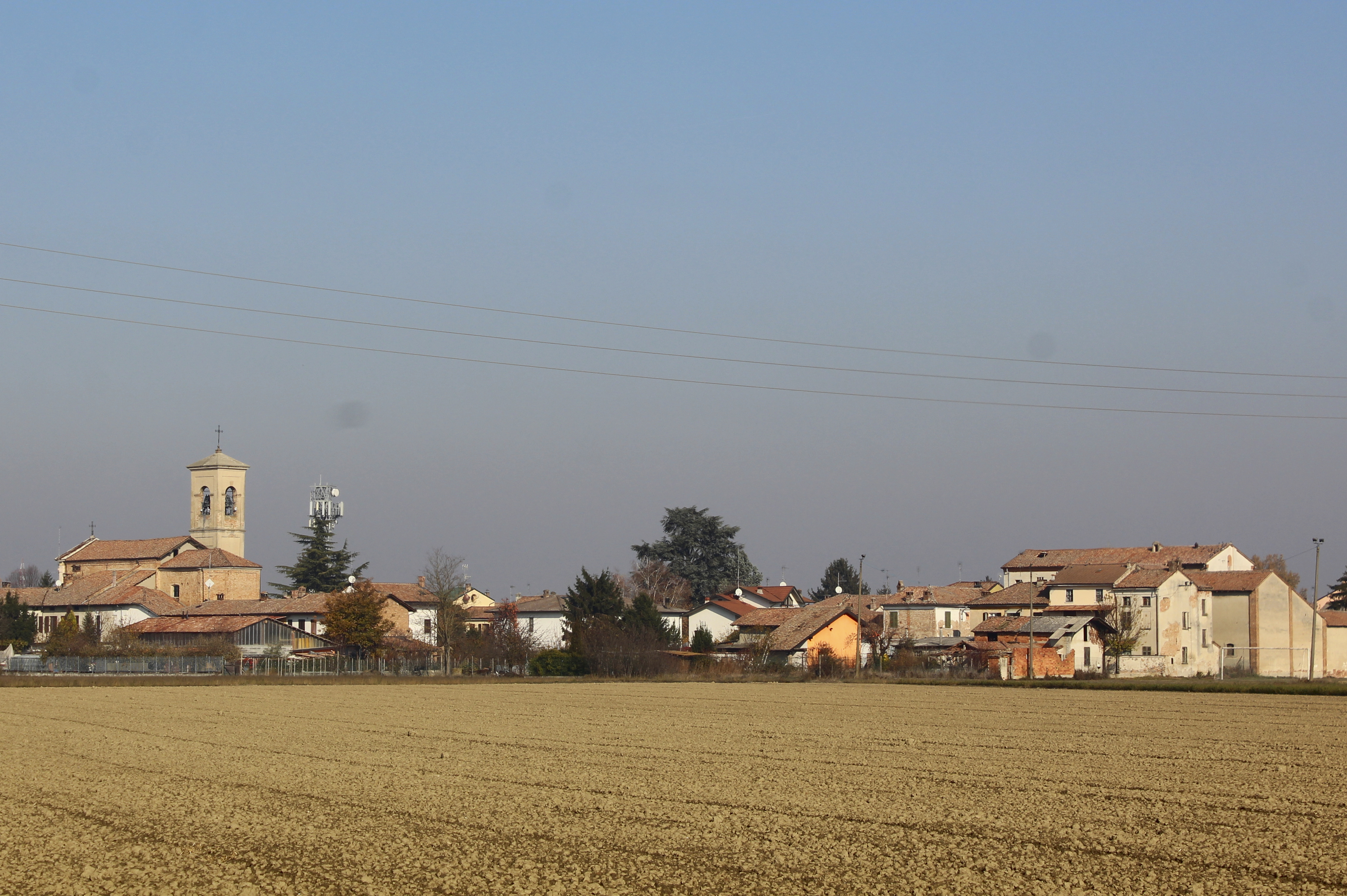
- View of Cornale

- Location within Italy Location within Lombardy
- Coordinates: 45°2′38.04″N 8°54′50.76″E
- Country: Italy
- Region: Lombardy
- Province: Province of Pavia (PV)
- Frazioni: Bastida de' Dossi, Cornale

Government
  - Mayor: Giuseppe Masso

Area
  - Total: 3.82 km^{2} (1.47 sq mi)
- Elevation ISTAT: 77 m (253 ft)

Population (31 December 2021)ISTAT
  - Total: 820
  - Density: 210/km^{2} (560/sq mi)
- Time zone: UTC+1 (CET)
  - Summer (DST): UTC+2 (CEST)
- Postal code: 27050
- Dialing code: 0383

Cornale e Bastida is a comune in the province of Pavia, in Lombardy, northern Italy, that was formed on 4 February 2014 from the merger of the comuni Cornale and Bastida de' Dossi.
