= Alessandro Berri =

Italian painter

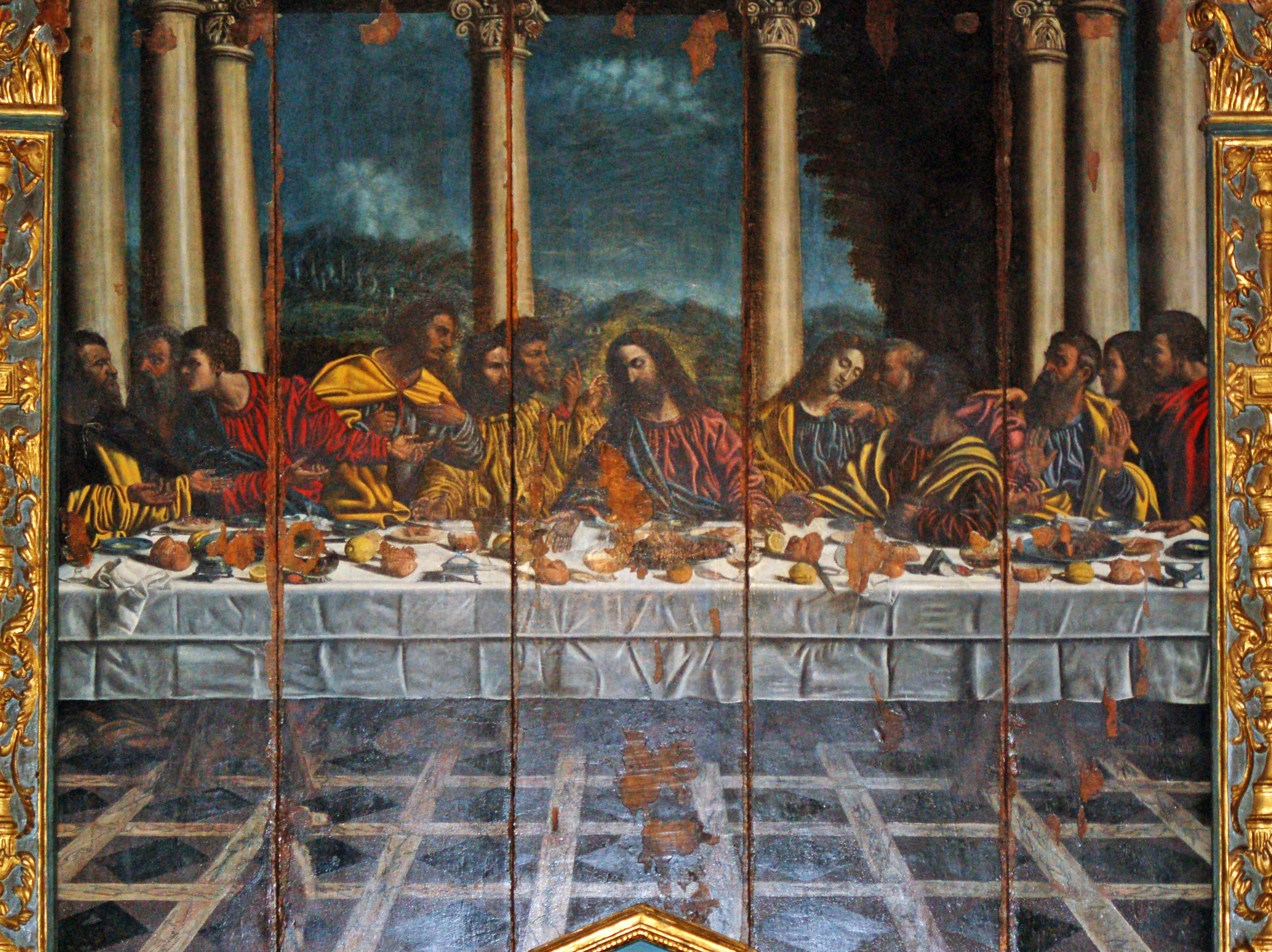
Alessandro Berri – Ultima Cena (Last Supper), 1540, Castelnuovo Scrivia, Alessandria, Italy

Content in this edit is translated from the existing Italian Wikipedia article at Alessandro Berri; see its history for attribution.

Alessandro Berri (late 15th century – middle-late 16th century) was an Italian painter who lived in Piedmont around the 1500s.

== Life ==
There is no clear information about his dates of birth and death, because most sources about him date back to the 1800s.

However, these sources tell that his place of birth was Castelnuovo Scrivia (a town in the province of Alessandria) and that he was the nephew of Vincenzo Bandello (uncle of the novelist Matteo Bandello), the prior of the church of Santa Maria delle Grazie in Milan during the period when Leonardo painted The Last Supper.

According to the 19-century historian Goffredo Casalis, thanks to the intercession of Vincenzo Bandello, Leonardo became the tutor of Alessandro Berri: "...(Leonardo)…spent quite a long time in Castelnuovo, where [Alessandro Berri] was introduced [to Leonardo] through Matteo Bandello and his uncle Vincenzo… (Leonardo) on his host's request agreed to train Alessandro Berri in the art of painting…".

These sources also tell that Berri became a "distinguished pupil" of his great maestro.

There are no further sources of information that may give exact data about Berri's artistic and painterly development.

From research conducted recently, Berri was married to Gabriella Signorio, lived in Castelnuovo Scrivia in the district of de Molinis and certainly had six children even if it is not to be excluded that he had others.

== Works ==
His most known work of art is a copy of the Ultima Cena 'Last Supper' which can be admired above the altar of the Corpus Domini Chapel of Saints Peter and Paul Church in Castelnuovo Scrivia.

The artwork (260 cm × 265 cm (102 in × 104 in)) is painted on a table made of five pieces of poplar wood commissioned by the Company of the Holy Sacrament of Castelnuovo Scrivia, of Alessandro Berri was a member.

He considerably lowered its cost both for the love for his company and "for the good feeling he had to leave this important memory of his virtue to his Country in such an important place…".

The paint itself can be seen as a copy of The Last Supper by Leonardo, but with the characters placed in a mirror-image arrangement to the original.

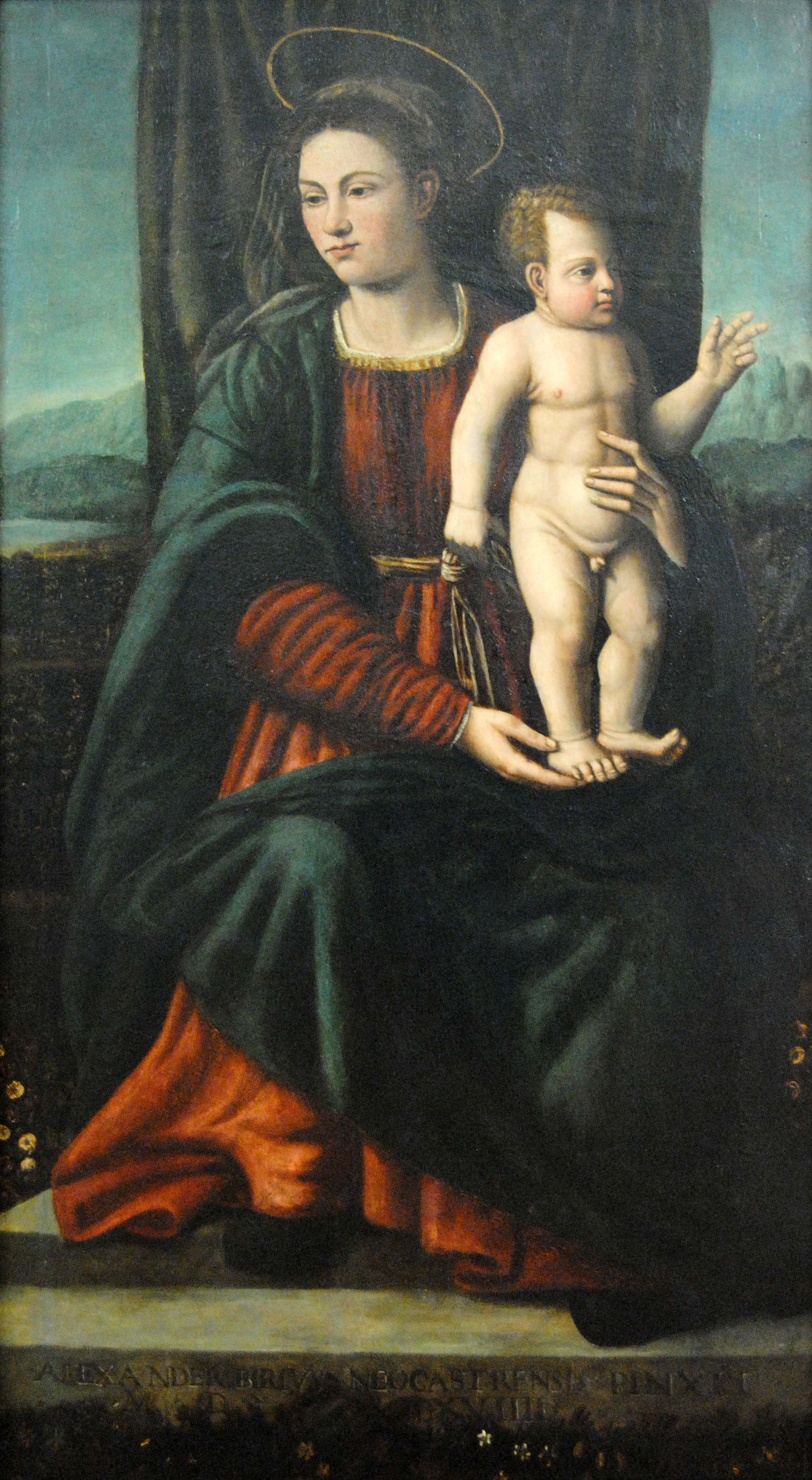
Alessandro Berri - "Madonna in trono con bambino", 1569, Castelnuovo Scrivia, Alessandria, Italy

Other known works are:

- An oil painting, Madonna in trono col Bambino, (1569) which was previously located at the picture gallery of Tortona and now is preserved in the Civic Museum of Palazzo Centurione (seat of the city hall) of Castelnuovo Scrivia. The work is signed at the bottom "Alexander Birius neocastrensis pinxit anno 1569";
- the frescoes on the southern part of the dell'Arengo room of the Castello Podestarile or Pretorio Palace (Castle of Torriani e Bandello) in Castelnuovo Scrivia. The lower part of a frieze bears the inscription "De Berris faciebat 1557";
- the coat of arms of the Avalos Gonzaga family, rulers of Castelnuovo Scrivia from 1526 till 1588, in the Castle of Torriani e Bandello;
- two frescoes portraying the prophets (1570–1571) on both sides of the altar in the Corpus Domini chapel, ordered by the Company of the Holy Sacrament.

Credited to Alessandro Berri is also the altar-step of 'The Last Supper' where some stories of the Passion are depicted. This work, sawed in the centre to insert a tabernacle, was re-discovered during the 1986 restoration of 'The Last Supper' as it was hidden by the lower wooden frame of the altar.

== Bibliography ==
- Antonello Brunetti, La parrocchiale "Santi Pietro e Paolo" di Castelnuovo Scrivia, 2005, pp. 163–182
- Antonello Brunetti, Storia e arte miscellanea castelnovese, Comune of Castelnuovo Scrivia, 2005, pp. 165–172
- Goffredo Casalis, Dizionario geografico, storico, statistico, commerciale degli stati di S.M. il re di Sardegna, G. Maspero, 1837, pp. 209, 213
- A.L. Millin, Voyage en Savoie, en Piémont, à Nice, et à Gênes, Chez C. Wassermann, 1816, p. 287
- A. Cavagna Sangiuliani, Studi storici 1, Volume 1, 1870, p. 168
- Giulio Antonio Costa, Preggi & obblighi della Venerabilissima Compagnia del SS. Sacramento, 1680
- VV.AA., Il restauro dell'Ultima Cena di Alessandro Berri sec XV, Quaderni della Biblioteca Comunale "P.A. Soldini", Castelnuovo Scrivia 1986
- VV.AA, Storia arte e restauri nel tortonese. Il palazzetto medioevale. Dipinti e sculture, Cassa di Risparmio di Tortona, 1993, pp. 94, 97
