= Alzano Scrivia =

Municipality in Piedmont, Italy

Alzano Scrivia Alsan
- Comune
- Comune di Alzano Scrivia
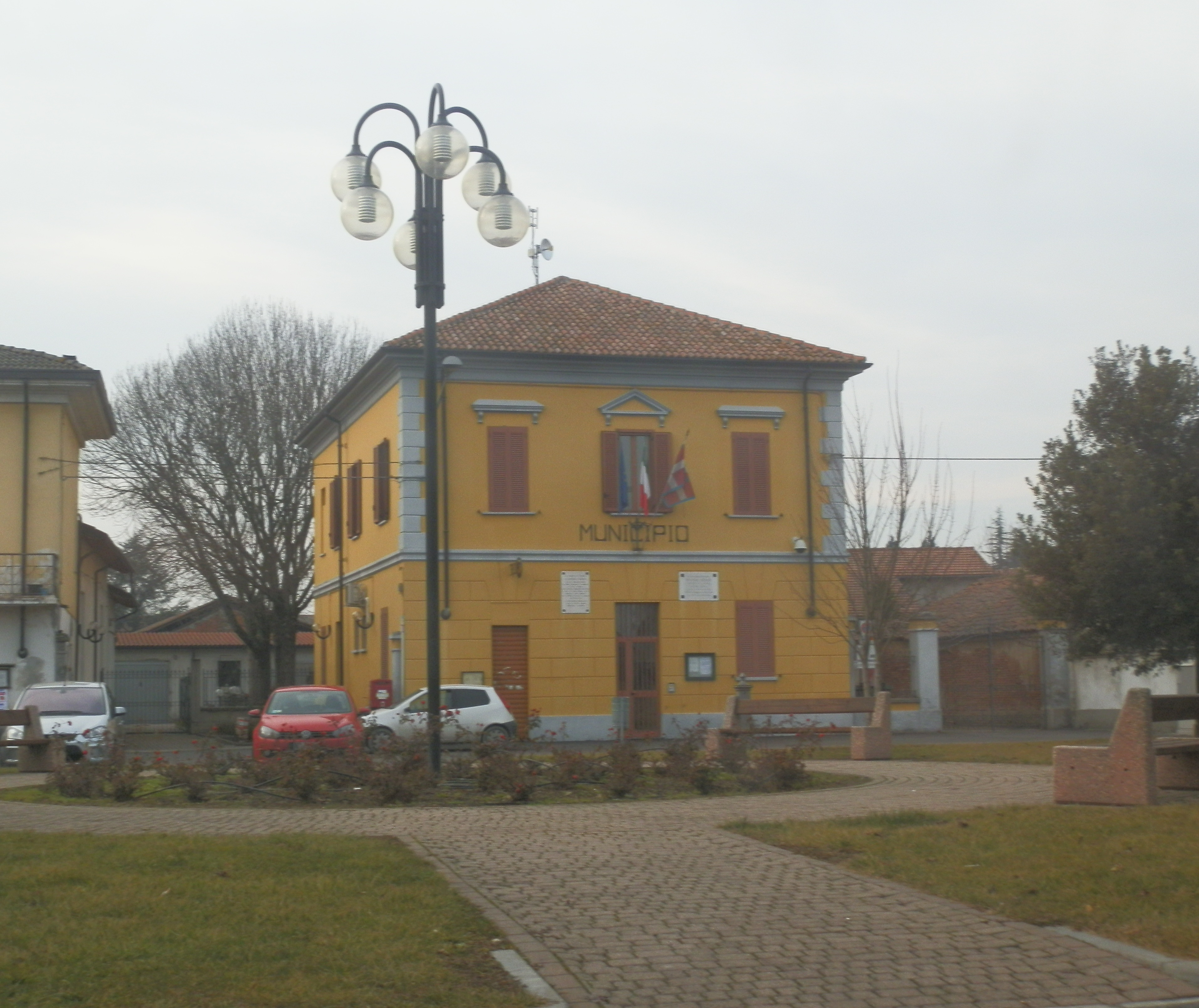

- Location within Italy Location within Piedmont
- Coordinates: 45°1′N 8°53′E
- Country: Italy
- Region: Piedmont
- Province: Province of Alessandria (AL)

Area
  - Total: 2.1 km^{2} (0.81 sq mi)

Population (Dec. 2004)
  - Total: 409
  - Density: 190/km^{2} (500/sq mi)
- Demonym: Alzanesi
- Time zone: UTC+1 (CET)
  - Summer (DST): UTC+2 (CEST)
- Postal code: 15050
- Dialing code: 0131

Alzano Scrivia (Piedmontese: Alsan) is a municipality (Italian: comune) in the Province of Alessandria in the Italian region Piedmont, located about 90 kilometres (56 mi) east of Turin and about 25 kilometres (16 mi) northeast of Alessandria. As of 31 December 2004, it had a population of 409 and an area of 2.1 square kilometres (0.81 mi^{2}).

Alzano Scrivia borders the following municipalities: Castelnuovo Scrivia, Guazzora, Isola Sant'Antonio, and Molino dei Torti.

The 18th-century Church of the Nativity of Mary host paintings of Giovani Marcello Zampollini (1888–1948), Pietro Mietta, Alessandro silla and Domenico Fossati.

== Demographic evolution ==
Historical population

Year	Pop.	±%
1861	630	—
1871	617	−2.1%
1881	638	+3.4%
1901	690	+8.2%
1911	592	−14.2%

Year	Pop.	±%
1921	556	−6.1%
1931	537	−3.4%
1936	496	−7.6%
1951	430	−13.3%
1961	395	−8.1%

Year	Pop.	±%
1971	372	−5.8%
1981	360	−3.2%
1991	374	+3.9%
2001	392	+4.8%

Source: Data from ISTAT
