= Gropello Cairoli =

- Comune
- Comune di Gropello Cairoli
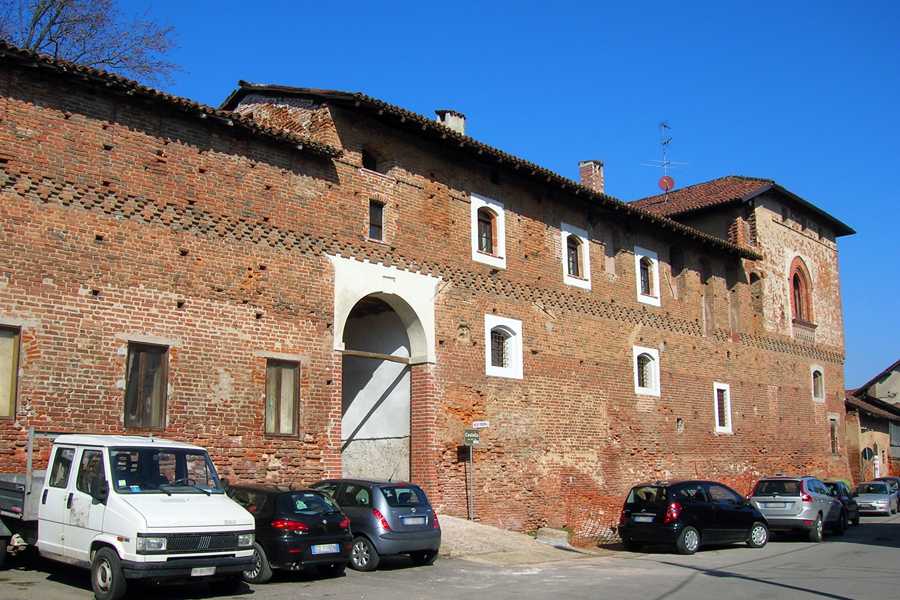

- Location within Italy Location within Lombardy
- Coordinates: 45°11′N 9°0′E
- Country: Italy
- Region: Lombardy
- Province: Province of Pavia (PV)

Area
  - Total: 26.1 km^{2} (10.1 sq mi)

Population (Dec. 2010)
  - Total: 4,602
  - Density: 176/km^{2} (457/sq mi)
- Demonym: Gropellesi
- Time zone: UTC+1 (CET)
  - Summer (DST): UTC+2 (CEST)
- Postal code: 27027
- Dialing code: 0382

Gropello Cairoli is a comune (municipality) with a population of 4,235 in the Province of Pavia in the Italian region of Lombardy. It is located in eastern Lomellina, a short distance from the edge of the terrace that overlooks the Ticino river's floodplain, about 35 km (22 mi) southwest of Milan and about 15 km (9.3 mi) west of Pavia.

The town of Gropello Cairoli, which gained city status due to historical merit, is mainly centered around the former state road 596 (known as the Cairoli road) leading to Pavia, a route heavily trafficked, especially due to the presence of the A7 highway exit. The town is one of the few examples in Europe of a medieval strassendorf (a village developed along a road). In 2000, a bypass was inaugurated to divert traffic away from the town center.

A notable feature of Gropello Cairoli is the presence of two churches, San Rocco and the parish church dedicated to San Giorgio, which mark the main road from east to west.

== History ==
The town most likely owes its name to the Latin Ripellium, due to its location on the banks of the Ticino River, or to Gruppellum, meaning a small cluster of houses.

Known since the 9th century, it was a fiscal curtis (estate) that King Berengar I granted in 900 to his loyal follower Folcuino, called Vasingone. It was possibly already defended by a castle at that time. In the following century, its lords were Bernardo (Count of Parma and, from 996, of Pavia) and his wife Rolinda (the illegitimate daughter of King Hugh). After regaining the estate from Emperor Otto II following a confiscation, they donated it to the canonry of the Holy Trinity in Pavia, which they had founded. It likely belonged to the domains of Pavia even before the city annexed the territories (Lomellina) in the 12th century after defeating the Palatine Counts of Lomello; within these domains, Gropello was included in the Lomellina district. After the Peace of Constance in 1183, it fell under the lordship of the Beccaria family, one branch of which took its name from this town. In 1437, Pietro Visconti, of a secondary branch of the illustrious family, was invested with the lordship as an inheritance from his mother, Orietta Beccaria.

The Visconti family of Breme and Gropello, divided into several branches, held the co-lordship of the fiefdom in the following centuries (which also included Zerbolò and Carbonara al Ticino). The fiefdom was inherited, at least in part, by the Lonati Visconti family and then passed by marriage to Count Lorenzo Taverna. After the end of feudalism (1797), the Taverna family remained the owners of the castle and a vast estate, which they sold in 1845 to the Pavia-born surgeon and university professor Carlo Cairoli.

Following the law of October 23, 1859, the town was included in the mandamento V of Garlasco and the III district of Lomellina, province of Pavia. The town, originally named Gropello, adopted the name Gropello Lomellino (Royal Decree of March 15, 1863, no. 1211) in 1863; later, in 1888, it took on its current name in honor of the five Cairoli brothers, heroes of the Italian Risorgimento and sons of Carlo Cairoli.

A close friend of one of the brothers, Benedetto Cairoli, was another distinguished citizen of Gropello, the philosopher Carlo Cantoni, a scholar of Kant (who was awarded a posthumous honorary degree by the University of Königsberg for his studies on Kant) and a senator of the Kingdom of Italy from 1898. He was responsible for the construction of the railway. The house where he was born is still intact and now hosts a guesthouse on the upper floors, while the frescoed rooms on the ground floor and the century-old park are reserved for events and receptions.

== Symbols ==
The coat of arms was officially recognized by decree of the head of government on September 29, 1936.

«D'argento, alla croce dai bracci scorciati di rosso, accantonata da otto T d'azzurro, a due a due, l'una diritta, l'altra capovolta. Ornamenti esteriori da Città.» «Silver, with a cross of shortened arms in red, surrounded by eight blue T's, paired in twos, one upright and the other upside down. Exterior ornaments of a City.»

The banner, granted by Presidential Decree on October 29, 1949, is a split drape of white and red.

== Honors ==
On May 3, 2011, Gropello Cairoli was named a "city for historical merits", and on the occasion of the event, a commemorative plaque was placed on the front of the town hall.

== Monuments and places of interest ==
=== Architectures ===
- Church of San Giorgio Martire

=== Natural areas ===
==== Bosco Barbieri ====
In the municipal area lies the Bosco Francesco Barbieri, located near the town center and at the foot of the terrace that marks the boundary of the Ticino valley. It covers an area of 16 hectares and consists of a wooded wetland with a notable presence of black alder, a habitat of significant community interest according to the Habitats Directive. The forest was acquired by Ticino Park thanks to a donation in memory of the zoologist Francesco Barbieri, who died in 2001.

==== San Massimo ====
The San Massimo Reserve — covering an area of about 460 hectares and classified as a Site of Community Importance IT 2080015 "San Massimo" — is notable for the presence of the last significant stretches of hygrophilous black alder forests (alnetum) in the Po Valley.

Classified as a Site of Community Importance (SCI) since 2004, and part of it later recognized as a Special Protection Area (SPA) due to the variety of ecosystems it hosts, the San Massimo Reserve is also an important agricultural enterprise that produces corn and rice. The natural spaces are interspersed with agricultural areas, rows of fruit trees, as well as water meadows and poplar groves. The alnetum is home to a heronry with about 1,000 herons, including little egrets and night herons. Grey herons, great white egrets, and purple herons can also be observed in the rice fields and small wetlands in search of prey.

==== Via Francigena ====
The historic route of the Via Francigena in Lombardy passes through the municipal area and along the town, coming from Garlasco and then heading toward Villanova d'Ardenghi.

== Demographic evolution ==
Historical population

Year	Pop.	±%
1861	3,463	—
1871	3,830	+10.6%
1881	4,320	+12.8%
1901	4,679	+8.3%
1911	4,617	−1.3%

Year	Pop.	±%
1921	4,246	−8.0%
1931	3,974	−6.4%
1936	3,851	−3.1%
1951	3,858	+0.2%
1961	3,844	−0.4%

Year	Pop.	±%
1971	3,798	−1.2%
1981	3,877	+2.1%
1991	3,973	+2.5%
2001	4,105	+3.3%

Source: Data from ISTAT

== Culture ==
=== Events ===
- Patronal feast: the patron saint of Gropello is Saint George the Martyr, whose equestrian statue battling the dragon stands atop the main church. The feast is celebrated on the Sunday closest to April 23 (Saint George the Martyr's Day).
- Festa dei Ragazzi: this is one of the town's most long-standing traditions. For over 70 years, at the beginning of September, children and teenagers representing the town's four districts – Castello, Parrocchia, Stazione, and San Rocco – "celebrate" the end of summer by competing in various games (soccer, athletics, quizzes, treasure hunts, etc., and in the 2011 edition, even Gaelic football) for an entire week. In the 2016 edition, the custom of decorating walls and houses with the colors of their district during the festival period was restored (green for Castello, blue for Parrocchia, red for San Rocco, and yellow for Stazione).
- Christmas market: for several years, on the first or second Sunday of December, a Christmas market has been organized on the main street (Via Libertà) that runs through Gropello, where artisanal and food products are displayed.

== Cuisine ==
The most typical product is the "Il Cairoli" biscuit, made by four local bakeries using rice flour, wheat, corn, sugar, eggs, yeast, and a few drops of lemon to commemorate Garibaldi's expedition to Sicily.

== Sport ==
=== Football ===
The two "historic" soccer teams of the town, AC Gropello and US S. Giorgio, merged in 2009 to form a single club, ASD Gropello S. Giorgio (team colors white and purple). In the 2010–11 sports season, after finishing their championship at the top of the W group of the Second Category with 66 points, tied with Sartiranese, they played a tiebreaker for first place. In 2017, a women's soccer team emerged and became established in Gropello Cairoli. After a "trial year" in C.S.I. tournaments, they moved on to the F.I.G.C. regional championships in Lombardy, earning promotion to Serie C in May 2016 and maintaining the category the following year.

=== Volley ===
Farmabios Sisa Volley Gropello, the local women's volleyball team, was founded in 1999. After numerous promotions, the team won its group and the title of regional champion of Lombardy in Serie C during the 2010–11 season. After nearly reaching the playoffs in (2012–13), the team sold its Serie B rights and restarted from the lower categories, where they still compete today.
