= Valeggio, Lombardy =

Valeggio
- Comune
- Comune di Valeggio
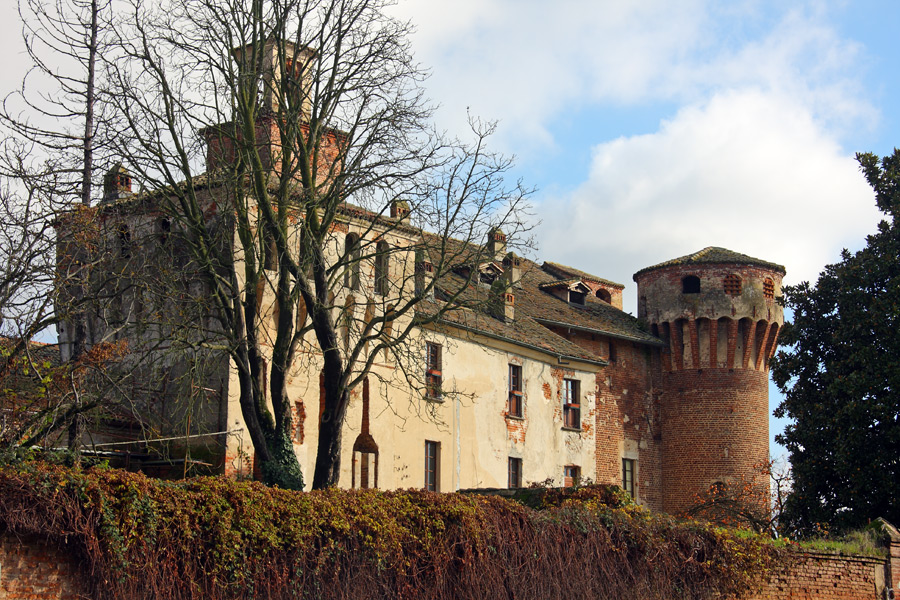
- Castle of Valeggio.

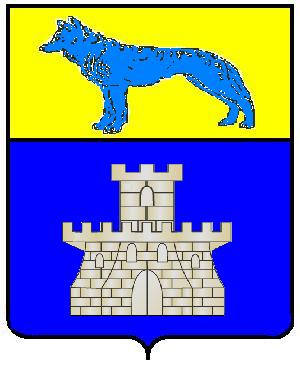
- Coat of arms

- Location within Italy Location within Lombardy
- Coordinates: 45°9′N 8°52′E
- Country: Italy
- Region: Lombardy
- Province: Pavia (PV)

Government
  - Mayor: Fabrizio Crepaldi

Area
  - Total: 9 km^{2} (3.5 sq mi)

Population (30 April 2010)
  - Total: 233
  - Density: 26/km^{2} (67/sq mi)
- Demonym: Valeggesi
- Time zone: UTC+1 (CET)
  - Summer (DST): UTC+2 (CEST)
- Postal code: 27020
- Dialing code: 0384

Valeggio (Italian pronunciation: [vaˈleddʒo]) is a commune in the Province of Pavia, region of Lombardy, Italy, located about 40 km southwest of Milan and about 25 km west of Pavia.

Valeggio borders the following municipalities: Alagna, Dorno, Ferrera Erbognone, Ottobiano, Scaldasole, Tromello. In medieval times, it was a fief of the monastery of San Salvatore at Pavia. Later it was under several noble families from the area, until it became part of the Duchy of Savoy in 1713. In 1859 it became part of the province of Pavia as part of the newly unified Kingdom of Italy.
