= Stradella, Gambolò =

Village in Gambolò, Italy

Coordinates: 45°16′N 8°53′E

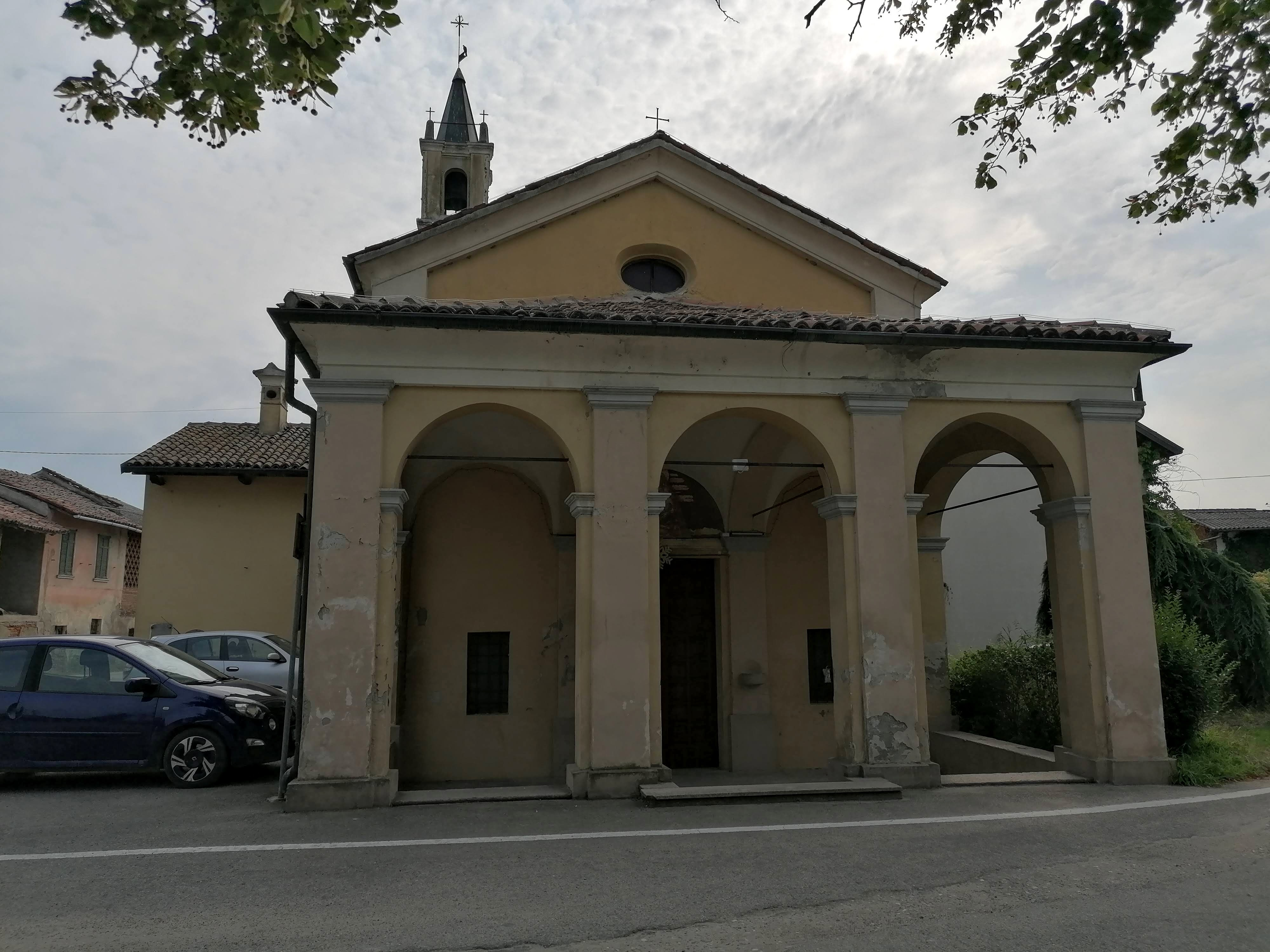

Location in Italy

Stradella is a village in the comune of Gambolò, Pavia province, in the northern Italian region of Lombardy, at about 100 m (328 ft) above sea-level, in the plain of the Ticino, about 8 km (5 mi) SW of the river. The resident population counted in the 2001 census was 50.
