= Domenico Fossati =

Italian painter

Domenico Fossati was born at Venice in 1743, and studied painting at the Accademia di Belle Arti of that city. He distinguished himself as a painter of architecture and a decorator, and his works are to be met with in the theatres and palaces of Venice, Padua, Vicenza, Verona, Udine, Monza, and Gratz, and in the Scala at Milan. He died in Venice in 1785.
