= Alagna =

Alagna Lagna (Lombard)
- Comune
- Comune di Alagna
- Location within Italy Location within Lombardy
- Coordinates: 45°10′N 8°53′E
- Country: Italy
- Region: Lombardy
- Province: Province of Pavia (PV)

Area
  - Total: 8.6 km^{2} (3.3 sq mi)
- Elevation: 92 m (302 ft)

Population (Dec. 2004)
  - Total: 876
  - Density: 100/km^{2} (260/sq mi)
- Time zone: UTC+1 (CET)
  - Summer (DST): UTC+2 (CEST)
- Postal code: 27020
- Dialing code: 0382

Alagna (Lombard: Lagna) is a comune (municipality) in the Province of Pavia in the Italian region of Lombardy, located about 40 kilometres (25 mi) southwest of Milan and about 20 kilometres (12 mi) west of Pavia. As of 31 December 2004, it had a population of 876 and an area of 8.6 square kilometres (3.3 mi^{2}).

Alagna borders the following municipalities: Dorno, Garlasco, Tromello, Valeggio.

== Demographic evolution ==
Historical population

Year	Pop.	±%
1861	1,206	—
1871	1,301	+7.9%
1881	1,519	+16.8%
1901	1,503	−1.1%
1911	1,430	−4.9%

Year	Pop.	±%
1921	1,498	+4.8%
1931	1,218	−18.7%
1936	1,219	+0.1%
1951	1,139	−6.6%
1961	1,007	−11.6%

Year	Pop.	±%
1971	831	−17.5%
1981	742	−10.7%
1991	729	−1.8%
2001	755	+3.6%

Source: Data from ISTAT
