= Carbonara al Ticino =

Municipality in Lombardy, Italy

- Comune
- Comune di Carbonara al Ticino
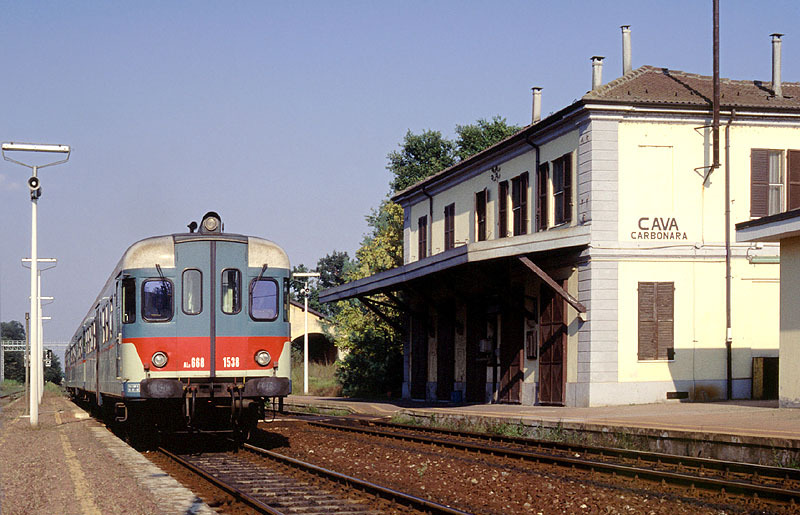
- Station of Cava, a frazione of the municipality.

- Coat of arms

- Location within Italy Location within Lombardy
- Coordinates: 45°8′N 9°6′E
- Country: Italy
- Region: Lombardy
- Province: Pavia (PV)
- Frazioni: Canarazzo, Cantarana, Sabbione

Government
  - Mayor: Stefano Ubezio

Area
  - Total: 14.78 km^{2} (5.71 sq mi)
- Elevation: 83 m (272 ft)

Population (31 May 2017)
  - Total: 1,499
  - Density: 101.4/km^{2} (262.7/sq mi)
- Demonym: Carbonaresi
- Time zone: UTC+1 (CET)
  - Summer (DST): UTC+2 (CEST)
- Postal code: 27020
- Dialing code: 0382
- Website: Official website

Carbonara al Ticino is a comune (municipality) in the Province of Pavia in the Italian region Lombardy, located about 35 km south of Milan and about 7 km southwest of Pavia.

It is part of the eastern Lomellina, near the left bank of the Ticino River.
