= Castelnuovo Scrivia =

- Comune
- Comune di Castelnuovo Scrivia
- Coat of arms

- Location within Italy Location within Piedmont
- Coordinates: 44°58′N 8°52′E
- Country: Italy
- Region: Piedmont
- Province: Alessandria (AL)
- Frazioni: Gerbidi, Ova, Pilastro, Secco

Government
  - Mayor: Pierangelo Luise

Area
  - Total: 45.4 km^{2} (17.5 sq mi)
- Elevation: 82 m (269 ft)

Population (2007)
  - Total: 5,508
  - Density: 121/km^{2} (314/sq mi)
- Demonym: Castelnovesi
- Time zone: UTC+1 (CET)
  - Summer (DST): UTC+2 (CEST)
- Postal code: 15053
- Dialing code: 0131
- Website: Official website

Castelnuovo Scrivia is a comune (municipality) in the Province of Alessandria in the Italian region Piedmont, located about 90 kilometres (56 mi) east of Turin and about 20 kilometres (12 mi) northeast of Alessandria.

== History ==
The city was fortified around 500 CE by order of Theoderic the Great, king of the Ostrogoths, and in 722 it was enlarged by the Lombard king Liutprand. An ally of Frederick Barbarossa in his war against the Lombardy communes, it took part in the destruction of Tortona in 1115, obtaining certain privileges in exchange. Around 1300 Castelnuovo became part of the Duchy of Milan.

In 1570 it changed name from Castelnuovo di Tortona to Castelnuovo Scrivia, and become a fief of the Marini family and, after their extinction in 1778, of the Centurione family.

== Main sights ==
- The parish church, in Romanesque style, dates to the 12th century although restored in the 16th and 19th century. It has a portal with medieval lions sculptures, lunette and capitals executed in Frederick Barbarossa times. The interior, on a nave and two aisles, houses a 15th-century fresco with the Madonna of the Misericordia and four 11th-century capitals from the old pieve. Moreover, in the "Corpus Domini" chapel, there is a 16th-century painting by Alessandro Berri, representing "The Last Supper". It is a copy of the famous mural painting "The Last Supper" by Leonardo da Vinci.
- Palazzo Pretorio (castle of the Torriani and Bandello families) has an ogival portico, with mullioned windows. The upper storey has 11th- and 16th-century frescoes. The castle has a crenellated tower, 39 metres (128 ft) high.
- Church of Sant'Ignazio (17th century)
- Palazzo Centurione (17th century), in Genoese style. It houses the city museum

== Notable people ==
- Matteo Bandello (c.1480–1562), writer.
- Alessandro Berri (c. 1600), painter
- Cesare Zerba (1892–1973), Roman Catholic cardinal.
- Vittorio Malosti (1900–1945). Artisan, killed one month after the end of World War II. The location of his body and the identity of his murderers were never revealed.

== Twin towns ==
- Port-Sainte-Marie, France
- Santa Domenica Talao, Italy
