= Mezzana Bigli =

- Comune
- Comune di Mezzana Bigli
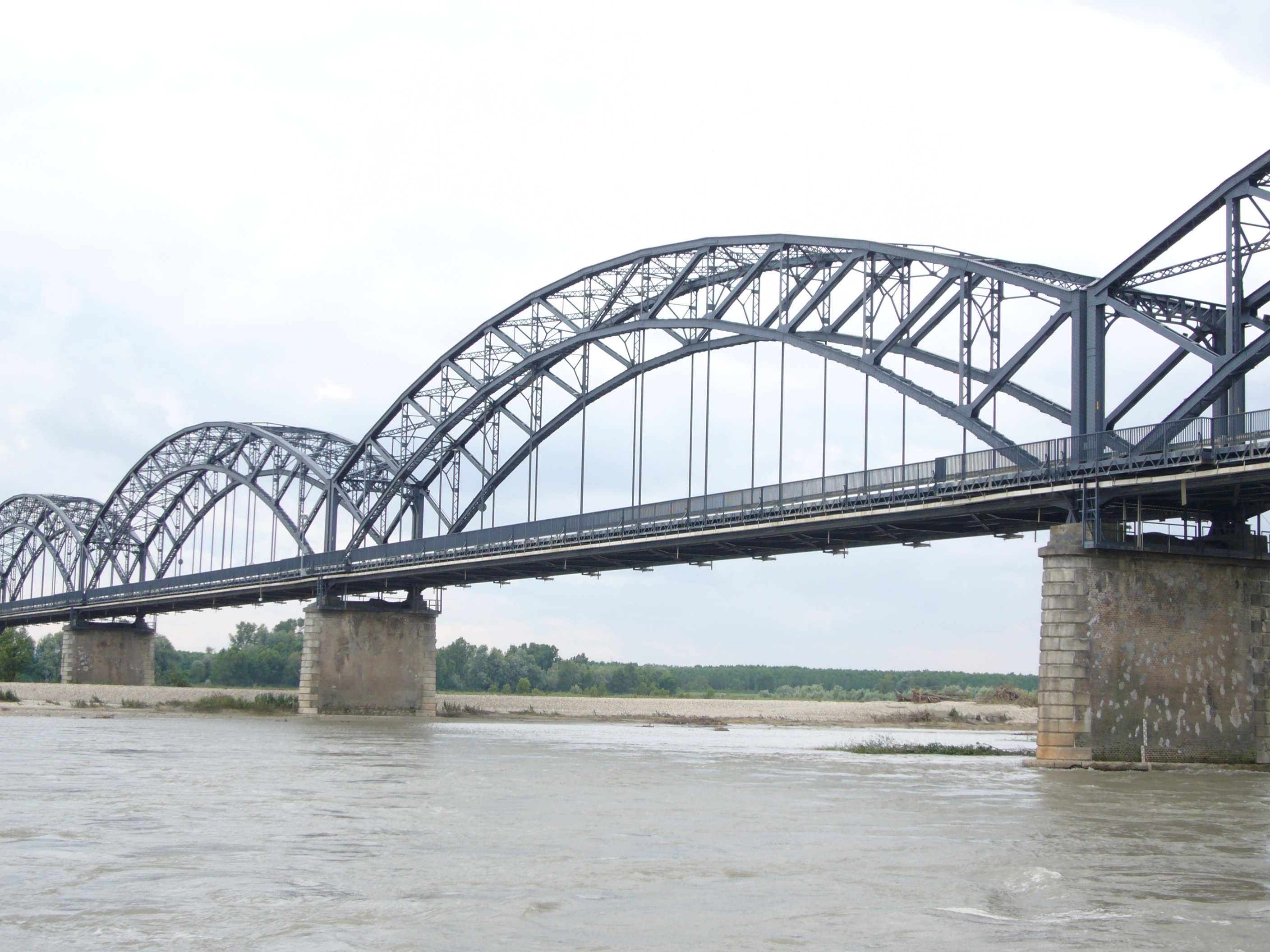

- Coat of arms

- Location within Italy Location within Lombardy
- Coordinates: 45°4′N 8°51′E
- Country: Italy
- Region: Lombardy
- Province: Pavia (PV)
- Frazioni: Balossa Bigli, Casoni Borroni, Erbatici, Isloa Barbieri, Messora, Terzo

Government
  - Mayor: Vittore Ghiroldi

Area
  - Total: 19.02 km^{2} (7.34 sq mi)
- Elevation: 76 m (249 ft)

Population (31 December 2021)
  - Total: 1,038
  - Density: 54.57/km^{2} (141.3/sq mi)
- Demonym: Mezzanesi
- Time zone: UTC+1 (CET)
  - Summer (DST): UTC+2 (CEST)
- Postal code: 27030
- Dialing code: 0384
- Patron saint: St. John the Baptist
- Saint day: 24 June
- Website: Official website

Mezzana Bigli is a comune (municipality) in the Province of Pavia in the Italian region Lombardy, located about 50 km southwest of Milan and about 25 km southwest of Pavia in the Lomellina traditional region, near the left bank of the Po River and its confluence with the Agogna.
