= Battle of Casorate =

1239 battle near Casorate during Frederick II's Milan campaign

- Part of the Guelph–Ghibelline conflict and the conflict between Frederick II and Pope Gregory IX
Date	October 1239
Location	Near Casorate Primo and Besate, Kingdom of Italy
Result	Inconclusive: Milan halts the Imperial offensive; Imperial tactical withdrawal

Belligerents
Holy Roman Empire; Kingdom of Sicily; Ghibelline cities: Cremona; Pavia; Lodi	Milan: Brescia; Crema; Rural militia of the Milanese contado

Commanders and leaders
Frederick II	Gregorio da Montelongo; Raimondo Ugoni; Ottone da Mandello

Strength
24,000–32,000: About 8,000 cavalry; 16,000–24,000 infantry; Saracen horse archers and Italian crossbowmen	20,000–25,000: About 5,000 cavalry; At least 15,000 infantry; Field fortifications, palisades and flooded ditches

Casualties and losses
500–700 killed, wounded or captured	500–1,000 killed, wounded or captured

The Battle of Casorate was an engagement fought in October 1239 near Casorate Primo and Besate during Frederick II's offensive against Milan. It formed the culminating phase of a campaign in which a large imperial army penetrated and devastated the Milanese countryside while attempting to force the city's forces into a favourable battle. Milan instead employed an elaborate mobile defensive system of fieldworks, flooded ditches and waterways which substantially neutralised the numerical and cavalry superiority of the imperial army. Near Casorate the Milanese again barred Frederick's route northward. A later Milanese account describes an attempted imperial advance across the defensive ditch being defeated by a sudden counterattack, although the precise course of the engagement remains uncertain. Frederick subsequently abandoned the immediate offensive against Milan, leaving the wider campaign strategically inconclusive.

== Background ==
Following the failure of the Siege of Brescia in 1238 and Frederick's renewed excommunication by Pope Gregory IX in March 1239, the conflict in northern Italy intensified. Gregory's legate Gregorio da Montelongo worked closely with Milan and the other anti-imperial communes, while Frederick sought to break the remaining centre of Lombard resistance by military force. In August Frederick ended a successful offensive against Bologna and concentrated his forces in Lombardy. By mid-September an imperial army containing approximately 8,000 cavalry and at least twice that number of infantry crossed the Lambro from Lodi into Milanese territory.

Frederick's operational plan combined devastation with manoeuvre. His forces burned Melegnano, Bascapè, Landriano, Lacchiarella and numerous smaller settlements while attempting to compel the Milanese to fight. He intended ultimately to pass around Milan from south to north and unite with Como and anti-Milanese nobles in Brianza, thereby increasing the pressure on the city from several directions. Milan mobilised approximately 5,000 cavalry and at least 15,000 infantry and chose to oppose the advance outside its walls. Rather than offer Frederick the conventional open battle he sought, its commanders exploited the dense network of canals south of the city to create successive fortified positions.

== Battle ==
The Milanese defensive system proved unusually sophisticated. Engineers, artisans and religious communities familiar with the management of Lombardy's irrigation network constructed earthworks, palisades and water-filled trenches, repeatedly adapting existing canals to military purposes. South of Chiaravalle, the Milanese diverted the waters of the Vettabbia into a ditch protecting a fortified line, making a massed cavalry attack hazardous. An imperial reconnaissance by Saracen light cavalry was counterattacked in the canal country and driven back with losses.

Frederick responded by manoeuvring rather than committing his cavalry against prepared obstacles. On 3 October, during a movement westward, imperial engineers constructed eleven bridges across the Lambro Merdario. Six were used for the advance while five were deliberately kept available as return routes in case the Milanese attacked the rear, an arrangement displaying considerable tactical caution in the movement of such a large army. Frederick subsequently advanced closer to Milan, but the defenders flooded the imperial encampment by blocking canals and breaking their banks, forcing another displacement. He then resumed his larger attempt to move west and north toward his allies.

Near Casorate and Besate the Milanese again intercepted him and rapidly erected a field fortification consisting of an earthen rampart, palisades, wooden gates and a water-filled ditch extending toward the Ticino. According to Galvano Fiamma, after five days of confrontation the Milanese apparently withdrew into nearby woodland. German, Pavesan and Cremonese cavalry advanced toward the apparently abandoned position, but while struggling across the ditch they were struck by a sudden Milanese counterattack and forced into a hurried retreat. Grillo considers the occurrence of an engagement plausible, while stressing that Fiamma, writing almost a century later, is the sole narrative source for its detailed course.

== Aftermath ==
By late October Frederick terminated operations around Milan. Imperial documents cease to be dated from the camps near the city after 22 October, and by 29 October the army had moved south and east toward the fortified Piacentine bridge across the Po. Attempts to seize that position also failed, possibly after flooding further disrupted the imperial encampment. On 9 November Frederick was again near Lodi, bringing almost two months of campaigning to an end.

The campaign nevertheless inflicted extensive material damage on Milan's contado and demonstrated the formidable offensive resources Frederick could still assemble after Brescia. His original strategic conception was ambitious: ravage the agricultural infrastructure supporting Milan, force its army into battle and, if possible, turn the city's western flank before linking with Como and anti-Milanese forces to the north. His conduct during the advance also showed tactical prudence when confronted by difficult terrain, particularly in his avoidance of costly frontal attacks against flooded fieldworks and his careful provision of multiple withdrawal routes during river crossings.

The decisive achievement, however, belonged to Milan's defensive system. The Milanese repeatedly prevented Frederick from translating superior numbers and mobility into an open-field decision, using waterways, artificial flooding and rapidly constructed fortifications to dictate where his army could move. The entire offensive ended in a nulla di fatto, while noting that Frederick's own final communiqué implicitly acknowledged how effectively the enemy had exploited marshes, hedges and ditches to deny him battle. The devastation of the Milanese countryside and capture of fortified places produced no fundamental change in the strategic situation, and the outcome as essentially a stalemate. Overall, the campaign illustrated both the sophistication of Frederick's operational approach and its limits against an opponent capable of adapting the landscape itself into a defensive weapon.

== Sources ==
- Abulafia, David (1988). Frederick II: A Medieval Emperor. London: Allen Lane. ISBN 9780713990041.
- Grillo, Paolo (2023). Federico II: La guerra, le città e l'Impero. Milan: Mondadori. ISBN 978-88-04-76912-5.
- Stürner, Wolfgang (2000). Friedrich II. Teil 2: Der Kaiser 1220–1250. Darmstadt: Primus Verlag. ISBN 978-3-534-12229-5.
