= Richard Pampuri =

Italian Roman Catholic saint

Saint Riccardo Pampuri O.H.
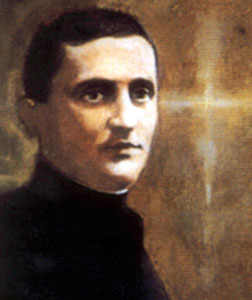

Religious
- Born: 2 August 1897; Trivolzio, Pavia, Kingdom of Italy
- Died: 1 March 1930 (aged 32); Milan, Kingdom of Italy
- Venerated in: Roman Catholic Church (Brothers Hospitallers of Saint John of God)
- Beatified: 4 October 1981, Saint Peter's Square, Vatican City by Pope John Paul II
- Canonized: 1 November 1989, Saint Peter's Basilica, Vatican City by Pope John Paul II
- Feast: 1 May; 16 May (Pavia and Brescia)
- Patronage: Trivolzio; Military chaplains; Nurses; Doctors

Riccardo Pampuri, OH (2 August 1897 – 1 May 1930) - born Erminio Filippo Pampuri was an Italian medical doctor and a veteran of World War I who was also a professed member of the Brothers Hospitallers of Saint John of God. Pampuri worked as a field doctor on the battlefield during the Great War and was discharged in 1920 when he was able to resume his studies and soon begin his own practice as a doctor where he tended to the poor without charge. He became a member of the Third Order of Saint Francis as "Antonio" while founding the Band of Pius X, which he dedicated to the medical care of poor people. But Pampuri later became a professed religious for the call was too great for him to ignore; he managed a free dental clinic in Brescia for his order.

Pampuri's canonization cause opened in the Milan archdiocese in 1970 and he became titled as a Servant of God, while Pope Paul VI titled him as Venerable on 12 June 1978 after confirming that he had lived a model life of heroic virtue. Pope John Paul II beatified Pampuri on 4 October 1981 and later canonized him at the end of that decade on 1 November 1989.

== Life ==
=== Childhood and education ===
Erminio Filippo Pampuri was born on 2 August 1897 in Trivolzio as the tenth of the eleven children to Innocenzo Pampuri and Angela Campari (1856-1900) and he was baptized on 3 August. His mother died in 1900 and he was then taken into the home of Giovanni and Maria Campari who were his maternal uncle and aunt at Torrino which was a village close to his. Later in 1907 his father died in Milan in a traffic accident and he remained in the care of his maternal aunt and maternal grandparents. His sister Maria became a nun (with the new name of "Longina") and she died in Cairo in 1977.

In his childhood he wanted nothing more than to become a priest in the missions but was dissuaded from this on account of his delicate health. But his doctor uncle Carlo inspired him to learn medicine and he soon became resolved to become a doctor. He attended two schools as a child at villages near his and then went to Milan where he attended a junior high school. He completed his high school studies as a boarder at Augustine's College in Pavia where - after graduation - he enrolled in the medical department of the Pavia college. Whilst he studied there he was an active member of the college's Severino Boezio Club for Catholic Action. He also belonged to the Società San Vincenzo de' Paoli and the Third Order of Saint Francis which he joined as a secular on 20 March 1921 in the name of "Antonio" at the Franciscan convent of Canepanova in Pavia.

Between 1 April 1917 and 1920 he was in the fighting zone in World War I where he worked in the field hospitals. He first served as a sergeant and later went into training as an officer in the medical corps. He resumed his studies in 1920 after being discharged that April. On 6 July 1921 he graduated at the top of his class in surgical and medical studies. From 1921 to 1924 he spent time in doing practical experience with his doctor uncle and after this for a short time served for a brief period as an assistant in the medical practice at Vernate before being appointed to the practice of Morimondo in Milan. In 1922 he passed his internship with high honours at the Milano Instituto di Ostetricia e Ginecologia.

In 1923 he was registered at the college in Pavia as a general practitioner in medicine. He later arrived in Morimondo to practice medicine where he gave valuable assistance to the parish priest and helped him to set up a musical band and a Catholic Action Youth Club of which he was the first president. He was also the secretary of the Parish Missionary Aid Society and he founded the Band of Pius X which he dedicated to the medical care of the poor whom he treated for free. Pampuri would soon leave his practice to become a religious after seeing that his call to the religious life was far too great to ignore.

=== Religious life ===
Pampuri joined the Hospitallers of Saint John of God in Milan on 22 June 1927 so as to follow evangelical holiness in a closer manner and at the same time to be able to continue his medical profession so as to alleviate the suffering of his fellow neighbours. He had hoped to become a Jesuit but rethought it and decided against it. He entered the novitiate at Brescia and at that time was given the religious habit of the order and the religious name of "Riccardo". Once he had completed a probation period of training, he made his profession of religious vows on 24 October 1928. He was then appointed as the director of the free dental clinic attached to the order's hospital at Brescia.

=== Illness and death ===
Pampuri had a fresh outbreak of pleurisy which he had first contracted during his war service and this soon degenerated into specific bronco-pneumonia coupled with tuberculosis which worsened in January 1930 to the point where he had to cut back on his work; these difficulties first were of a respiratory kind since 1929. On 18 April 1930 he was taken from Brescia to Milan where he died on 1 May; he had met his nephew Alessandro on 30 April to bid him farewell. His remains are in his old parish church in his village of Trivolzio after being exhumed and relocated on 16 May 1951.

== Sainthood ==
The canonization process opened in the Milan archdiocese under Cardinal Blessed Ildefonso Schuster on 14 December 1951. His writings were all investigated and found to be in line with official doctrine thus received theological approval on 4 May 1954 while the formal introduction to the cause came on 10 July 1970 in which he was named as a Servant of God. Cardinal Giovanni Colombo oversaw an apostolic process in 1971 after which stage all documentation collected was sent to the Congregation for the Causes of Saints (C.C.S.) in Rome who validated both processes on 3 December 1971.

The members of the C.C.S. and their official consultants voiced their approval to the cause on 29 November 1977 while the C.C.S. members alone met and approved the cause on 21 February 1978 after reviewing all the documentation. On 12 June 1978 he was proclaimed to be Venerable after Pope Paul VI confirmed that Pampuri had led a model life of heroic virtue.

One miracle that science could not explain - a healing - had to be investigated and approved for Pampuri to be beatified. The approval of one such healing allowed for Pope John Paul II to preside over Pampuri's beatification on 4 October 1981. The second miracle required for full sainthood was investigated in Spain in Alcadozo and concerned the 5 January 1982 cure of the child Manuel Cifuentes Rodenas (b. 1971) who would normally have been blinded in his right eye, due to a certain injury his eye received from an almond tree branch, but inexplicably his eye healed back to still provide vision, after his father appealed to the late Pampuri for a healing. This was investigated on a diocesan level and the C.C.S. validated the process on 6 February 1987 with a medical panel approving it on 19 October 1988. Theologians also approved this miracle on 17 January 1989 as did the C.C.S. on 11 February 1989. John Paul II canonized Pampuri as a saint of the Roman Catholic Church on 1 November 1989.
