= Baldassare Ravaschieri =

Italian Roman Catholic priest

Blessed Baldassare Ravaschieri O.F.M.
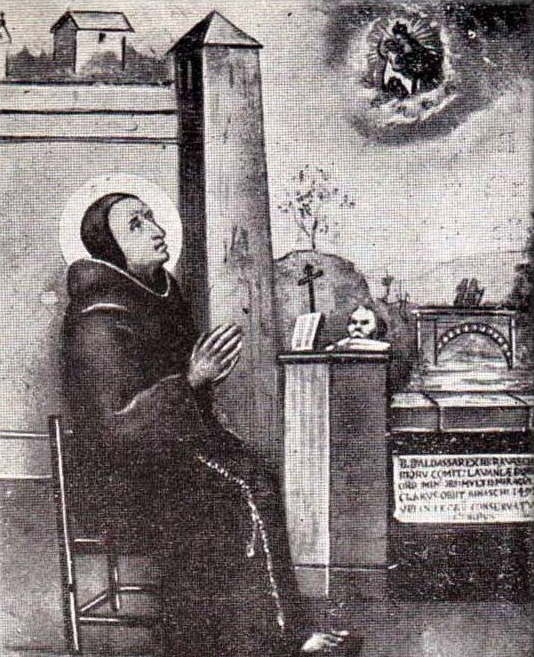

Priest
- Born: 1420; Chiavari, Republic of Genoa
- Died: 17 October 1492 (aged 72); Binasco, Duchy of Milan
- Venerated in: Roman Catholic Church
- Beatified: 8 January 1930, Saint Peter's Basilica, Vatican City by Pope Pius XI
- Feast: 16 October (Diocese of Pavia); 17 October
- Attributes: Franciscan habit
- Patronage: Chiavari; Against gout

Baldassare Ravaschieri, OFM (1420 – 17 October 1492) was an Italian Catholic priest and a professed member of the Order of Friars Minor. Ravaschieri served as a noted preacher and confessor and befriended as contemporaries Bernardine of Feltre and architect Giovanni Antonio Amadeo.

Ravaschieri's beatification received confirmation on 8 January 1930 after Pope Pius XI issued a decree that acknowledged his 'cultus' (or popular devotion and following).

== Life ==
Baldassare Ravaschieri was born in the Republic of Genoa in 1420 to nobles whose ancestors were the counts of Lavagna; his father was Count Cattaneo (d. 1421). His aunts Ginerva and Tobia - both Franciscan tertiaries - were responsible for his religious upbringing.

He entered the convent of the Order of Friars Minor not too far from his home in Genoa where he became noted for being a good theologian and a model religious while also acting as a zealous confessor. He was also known for his practice of mortifications. Ravaschieri also served as the order's superior and later its vicar provincial. His studies for the priesthood were conducted at Santa Maria del Campo (where he earned his doctorate in theological studies) before he was ordained as a priest. Ravaschieri also suffered from gout which limited his movements and required him to sometimes be carried to Mass.

Ravaschieri also served as a preacher alongside Bernardine of Feltre. He was a friend of the architect Giovanni Antonio Amadeo and the confessor of Veronica of Milan. It was once said that on one winter night he had remained in the woods where it was snowing though the spot he was sitting in was without snow.

He died on 17 October 1492. His relics were transferred to Pavia in 1805.

== Beatification ==
The Diocese of Pavia initiated the cause for beatification that later resulted in the recognition of his 'cultus' (or popular following) which allowed for Pope Pius XI - on 8 January 1930 - to confirm his beatification.
