= Casorate Primo =

- Comune
- Comune di Casorate Primo
- Coat of arms

- Casorate Primo within the Province of Pavia

- Location within Italy Location within Lombardy
- Coordinates: 45°19′N 9°1′E
- Country: Italy
- Region: Lombardy
- Province: Pavia (PV)

Government
  - Mayor: Enrico Vai (Voi con Noi-Per Casorate)

Area
  - Total: 9.74 km^{2} (3.76 sq mi)
- Elevation: 103 m (338 ft)

Population (31 December 2017)
  - Total: 8,680
  - Density: 891/km^{2} (2,310/sq mi)
- Demonym: Casoratini or Casoratesi
- Time zone: UTC+1 (CET)
  - Summer (DST): UTC+2 (CEST)
- Postal code: 27022
- Dialing code: 02
- Patron saint: Saint Victor
- Website: Official website

Casorate Primo (Milanese dialect of Western Lombard: Casurà) is a comune (municipality) in the Province of Pavia in the Italian region Lombardy, located about 20 kilometres (12 mi) southwest of Milan and about 20 kilometres (12 mi) northwest of Pavia.

Casorate Primo borders the following municipalities: Besate, Bubbiano, Calvignasco, Morimondo, Motta Visconti, Trovo, Vernate. It also borders the Province of Milan.

== Etymology ==
The origin of the word "Casorate" is debated.

A Latin etymology for the word has been considered, especially from the word casula (little house), or the medieval Latin term casuri (also little house). On the other hand, a Celtic origin of the name has been suggested to, from the word casurus, which would date back to the Gaulish domination, which might suggest that the town's origins are even older than the generally accepted theory of a Roman origin.

In 865 AD, a document makes reference to Catoriacum or Catoriaco, which is believed to be a reference to Casorate. In 1193, it seemed to be called Caxeradho. The addition of "Primo" (Italian for "first") to Casorate came about on March 15, 1863, due to it belonging to what was at the time the First District of Milan, and it has since then been named thus.

== History ==
The origins of Casorate Primo are not clearly known. The first evidence of settlement in the current location of the town date back to the 2nd and 3rd centuries AD, during the ancient Roman dominion of the area (at which time the land was part of Cisalpine Gaul, due to being inhabited by Celtic peoples, such as the Insubres). Nonetheless, due to a lack of archaeological and historical evidence, it is possible that there were settlements on the territory from before this period. By the 5th-6th century, the village was fully Christianized.

The first document which mentions the town dates from 865 AD, as "Catoracium". Another appears in 977 AD, in which Holy Roman Emperor Otto II gave the Bishop of Pavia feudal sovereignty over a territory which included Casorate. Due to being under such a rule, the town was shielded from a lot of political affairs, even though its territory saw the 1239 battle between the Lombard League and Frederick II of Hohenstaufen, which saw the latter's defeat.

Casorate Primo was referred to as an oppidum in the 15th century, which would suggest that it had city walls, similar to some nearby communes such as Binasco and Rosate. Historians seem to suggest that such walls were flattened in 1783.

== Relationship with Milan and Pavia ==
Casorate Primo has had an interesting relationship with both cities, being more or less geographically equidistant between the two. Historically, Milan and Pavia have fought over control of the village, due to its fertile terrain, bigger population compared to neighbouring villages, and its elegant manor houses.

From a religious point of view, Casorate has almost always been under Milan. Today, Casorate Primo is part of the Roman Catholic Archdiocese of Milan, and as such practices the Ambrosian rite. However, from an administrative perspective, Milan has historically been under Pavia's authority, such as under the Duchy of Milan's Province of Pavia, and was part of the Campagna Soprana.

Despite being part of the Province of Pavia, the people of Casorate Primo speak casoratese, which is a variant of the Milanese dialect of Insubric, as opposed to the Pavese dialect.
