= Albericus de Rosate =

Italian jurist

Albericus or Alberico de Rosate (or Rosciate; c. 1290 – 1354 or 1360) was an Italian jurist.

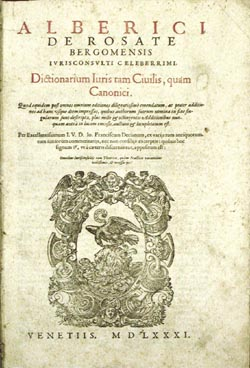
Dictionarium, 1581.

== Early life and education ==
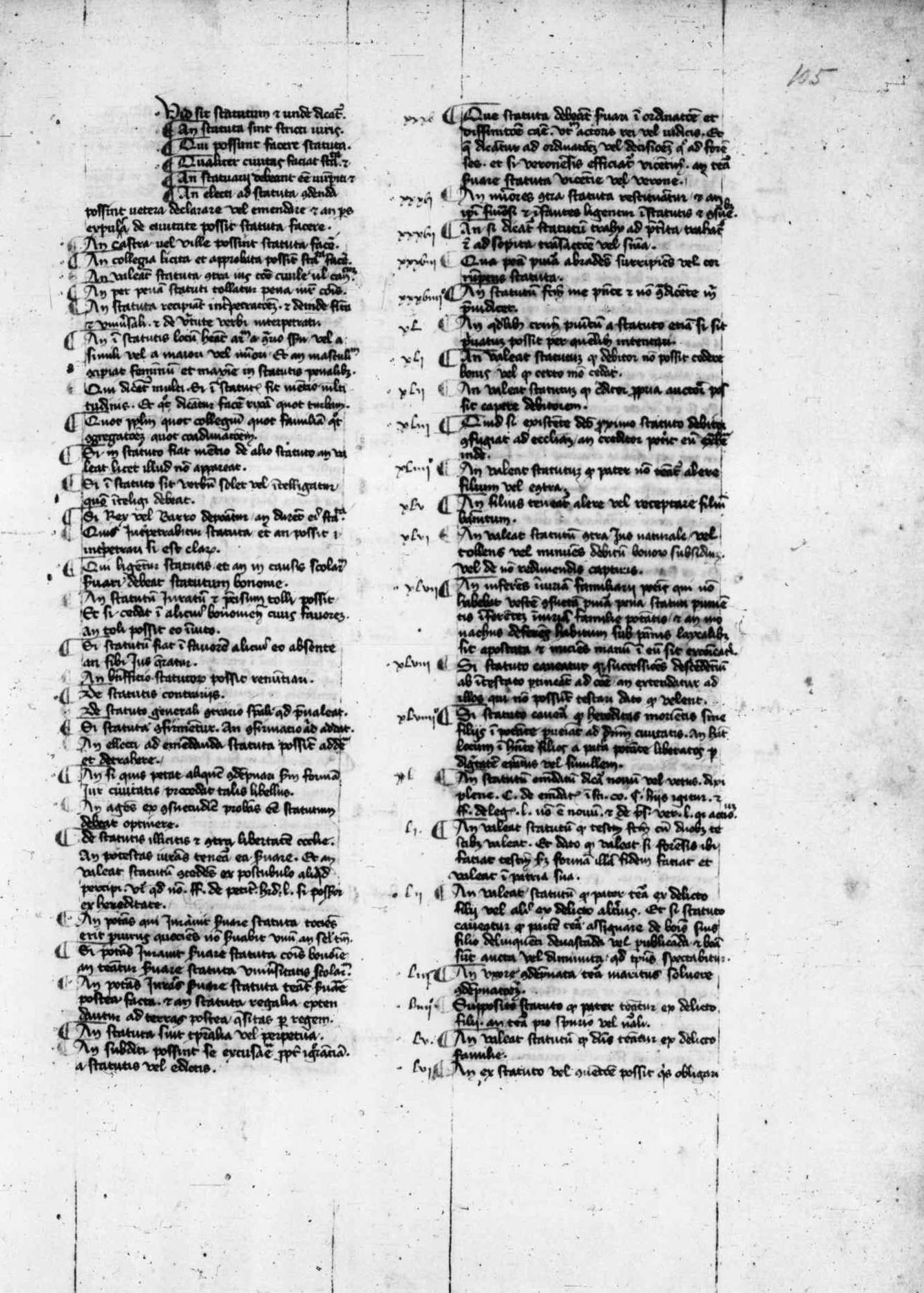
Opus statutorum, manuscript, 1413-1415. London, British Library.

He was born in the village of Rosate (Rosciate) in the district of Bergamo, and was of humble parentage. He studied law under Oldradus de Ponte and Rizzardo Malombra at the University of Padua, where he gained the degree of Doctor, without, however, becoming a teacher.

Albericus also studied under Ranieri di Forlì and had contact with Bartolus de Saxoferrato. In the 1310s, he returned to Bergamo, where he was a lawyer and took part in various public affairs. He was employed in particular by Galeazzo II Visconti of Milan, and after Galeazzo's death by Luchino Visconti and the latter's brother John, Bishop of Novara. In 1331 and 1333, he was involved in reforming Bergamo's civil statutes, and he was sent several times (in 1335, 1337–38 and 1340–41) as ambassador to Pope Benedict XII's court at Avignon.

== Later years ==
In his later years, Albericus devoted himself especially to scientific literary labours. The last certain report concerning his life belongs to the year 1350, when he went with his sons to Rome to attend the jubilee.

He died in Bergamo in the late 1350s.

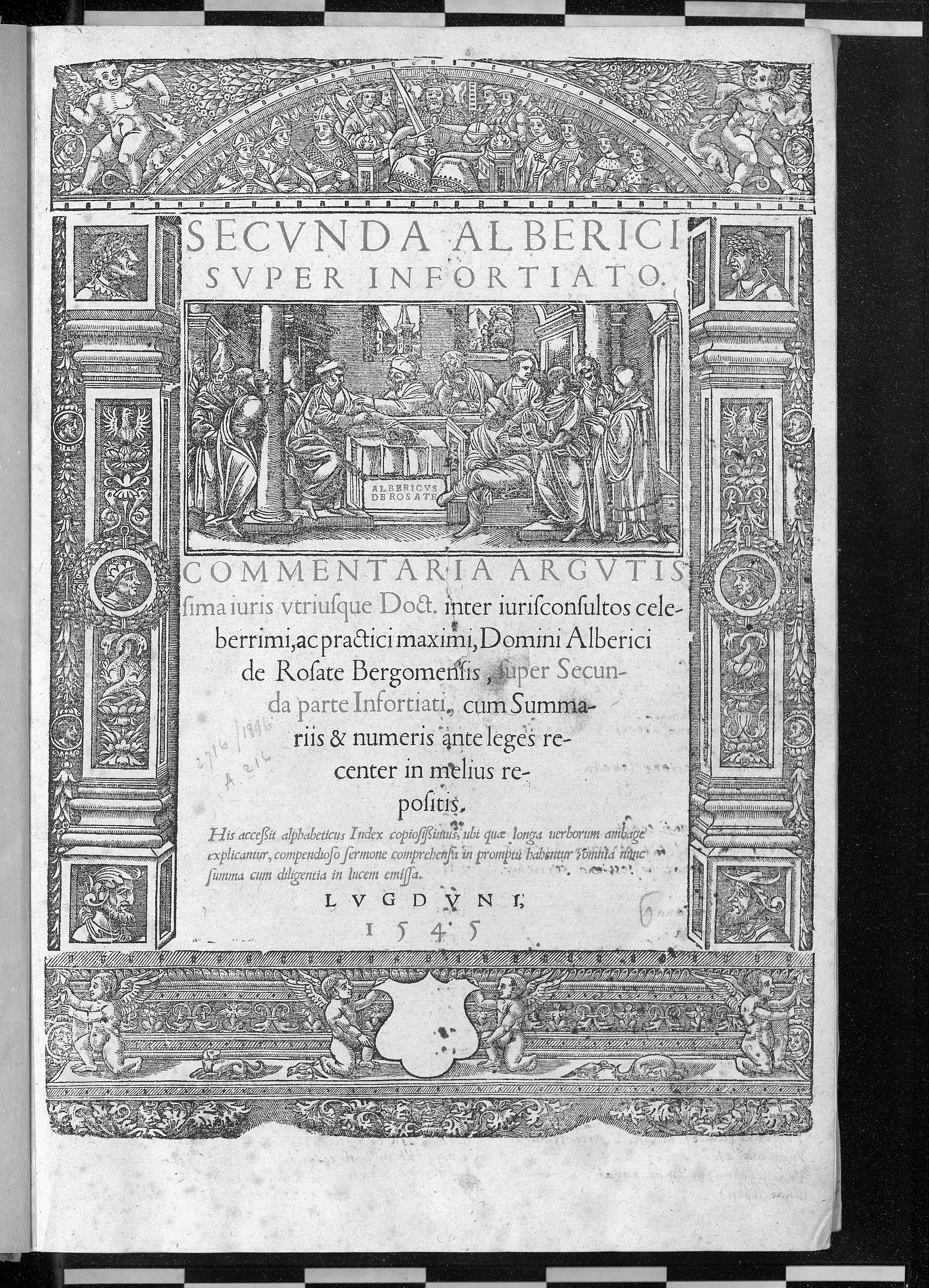
Super secunda parte Infortiati, 1545

== Works ==
His writings won him a high reputation, especially among practical jurists. Special mention should be made of his commentaries on the Digests and the Codex, which were often printed later, as at Lyon (1517, 1545–48); the "Opus Statutorum" (Como 1477; Milan, 1511); and the Dictionarium, a collection of maxims of law as well as a dictionary, which was often reprinted.

=== Editions ===
Dictionarium, 1548 edition (digitized book)

- Quaestiones statutorum
  - Super statutis (in Latin). Milano: Tipografo del Barbazza, Consilia. 1493.
- Commentaria
  - Super Codice (in Latin). Milano: Ulrich Scinzenzeler. 1492.
  - Super Codice (in Latin). Vol. 1. Lyon: Georges Regnault. 1545.
  - Super Codice (in Latin). Vol. 2. Lyon: Thomas Bertheau. 1545.
  - Super prima parte Infortiati (in Latin). Vol. 1. Lyon: Georges Regnault. 1545.
  - Super secunda parte Infortiati (in Latin). Lyon: Georges Regnault. 1545.
  - Super prima parte Digesti Veteris (in Latin). Vol. 1. Lyon: Thomas Bertheau. 1545.
  - Super secunda parte Digesti Veteris (in Latin). Vol. 2. Lyon: Thomas Bertheau. 1545.
  - Super prima parte Digesti Novi (in Latin). Vol. 1. Lyon: Georges Regnault. 1548.
  - Super prima parte Digesti Novi (in Latin). Vol. 1. Lyon: Georges Regnault. 1548.
- Dictionarium iuris tam civilis quam canonici
  - Dictionarium iuris civilis et canonici (in Latin). Bologna: Henricus de Colonia. 1481.
  - Dictionarium ad vtriusque iuris facilitatem pertingere nitenti maximè necessarium (in Latin). Lyon: Thomas Bertheau. 1548.
- Codice Grumelli
- De accenti, a short grammatical treatise
- De aspiratione, a short grammatical treatise
- De orthographia, a short grammatical treatise
- De regulis iuris.
