= Visconti Castle (Bereguardo) =

Castle in northern Italy

- Castello Visconteo di Bereguardo
- Bereguardo
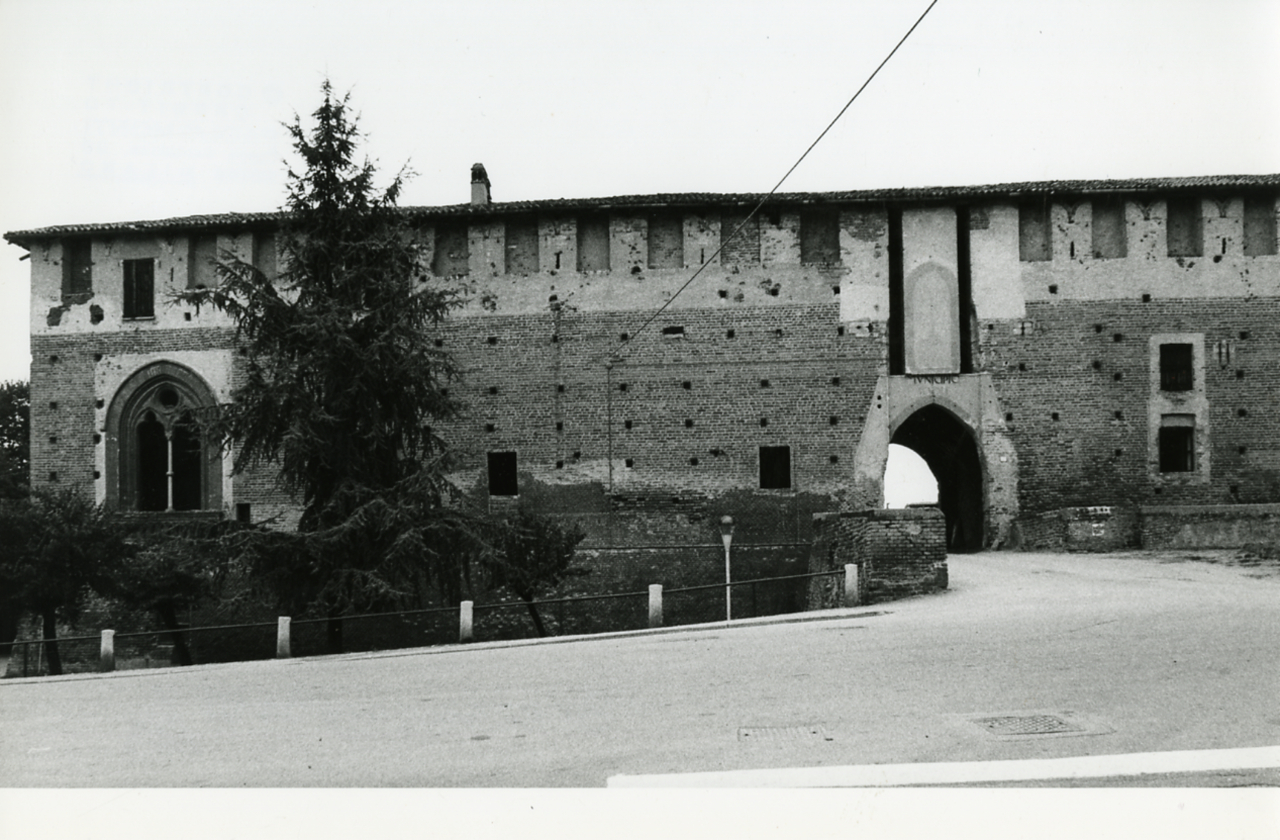
- The castle in a 1980 photo by Paolo Monti

Site information
- Type: Medieval castle
- Owner: Municipality of Bereguardo
- Open to the public: Yes
- Condition: Good

Location
- Coordinates: 45°15′22″N 9°01′35″E

Site history
- Built: 14th century
- Built by: Luchino Visconti
- Materials: Bricks

The Visconti Castle of Bereguardo, Castello Visconteo of Bereguardo in Italian, is a medieval castle in Via Castello 2, Bereguardo, Province of Pavia, Lombardy, Italy.

== History ==
The castle is one of the several residences the Visconti, dukes of Milan, built west of their city. It has the quadrangular plan characteristic of the Visconti castles of the Lombard Plain but lacks the typical corner towers. Luchino Visconti probably built the castle around the middle of the 14th century. Galeazzo II Visconti used it as a temporary residence of his court.

Filippo Maria Visconti enlarged the castle in the 15th century. He also added a wide mullioned window near the western corner, as attested by its central marble column, bearing the initials FM, which stands for Filippo Maria. Filippo Maria also built the Naviglio di Bereguardo, which connected the Naviglio Grande at Abbiategrasso, about 17 kilometres (11 mi) north, with the castle. The dukes of Milan could then go from Milan to Bereguardo by boat, navigating along the Naviglio Grande until Abbiategrasso and the Naviglio di Bereguardo until the castle.

In 1450, Duke Francesco I Sforza entrusted the Bereaguardo possessions to his son-in-law Giovanni Maruzzi da Tolentino. The Tolentino family was lord of Bereguardo and owner of the castle until the 18th century. The various branches of the family progressively divided their lands. One of them built a Baroque villa in front of the castle.

After a few ownership changes, the building came to the engineer Giulio Pisa, who, at the end of the 19th century, donated it to the town of Bereguardo. The municipality of Bereguardo transformed the castle, adapting its rooms for private housing.

The most notable change over the centuries was the demolition of the porticoed wing that closed the courtyard to the west.

At the end of the 20th century, the municipality of Bereguardo completely restored the castle of Bereguardo to use it for the local community.

== Today ==
Currently, the castle hosts the Abbiategrasso municipality offices and the civic library.

The demolition of one side of the castle gave it the current U-shaped plan. The most significant architectural element is the mullioned window near the western corner. The side with the main entrance maintains a moated bridge and displays the original crenellations.

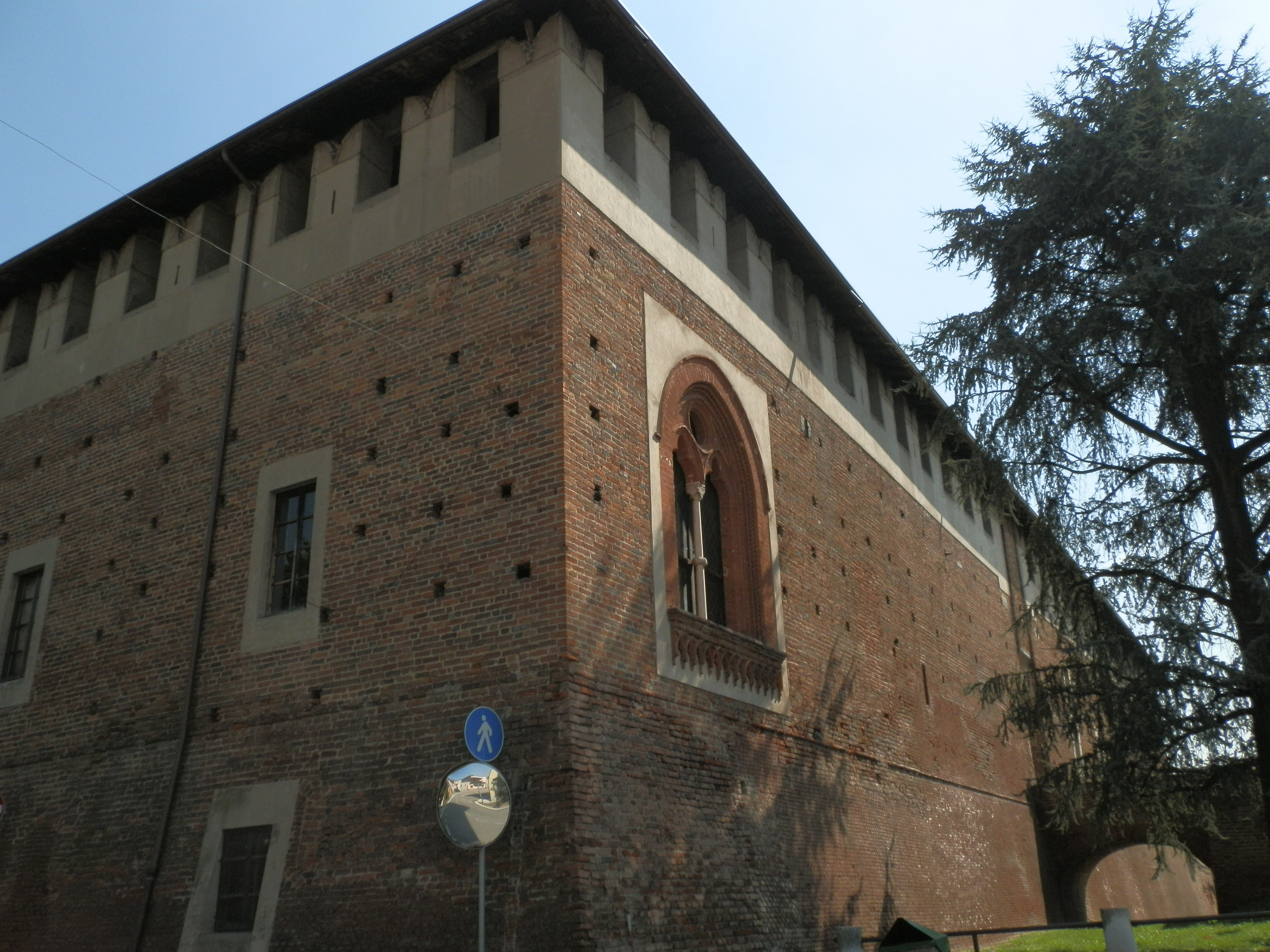
The corner with the mullioned window

== Sources ==
- Cavagna Sangiuliani, A. (1907). "Il Castello di Bereguardo". Ville e castelli d'Italia. Lombardia e laghi (in Italian). Milan: Edizione della Tecnografica. pp. 371–372. OCLC 23515589.
- Conti, Flavio; Hybsch, Vincenzo; Vincenti, Antonello (1990). I castelli della Lombardia. Provincie di Milano e Pavia (in Italian). Novara: Istituto Geografico de Agostini. ISBN 9788840291086. OCLC 635639773.
- Del Tredici, Federico; Rossetti, Edoardo (2012). Castle trails from Milan to Bellinzona - Guide to the dukedom's castles. Milan: Nexi-Castelli del ducato. ISBN 9788896451069. OCLC 955635027. Archived from the original on July 13, 2024.
