= Noviglio =

Noviglio Novèj (Lombard)
- Comune
- Comune di Noviglio
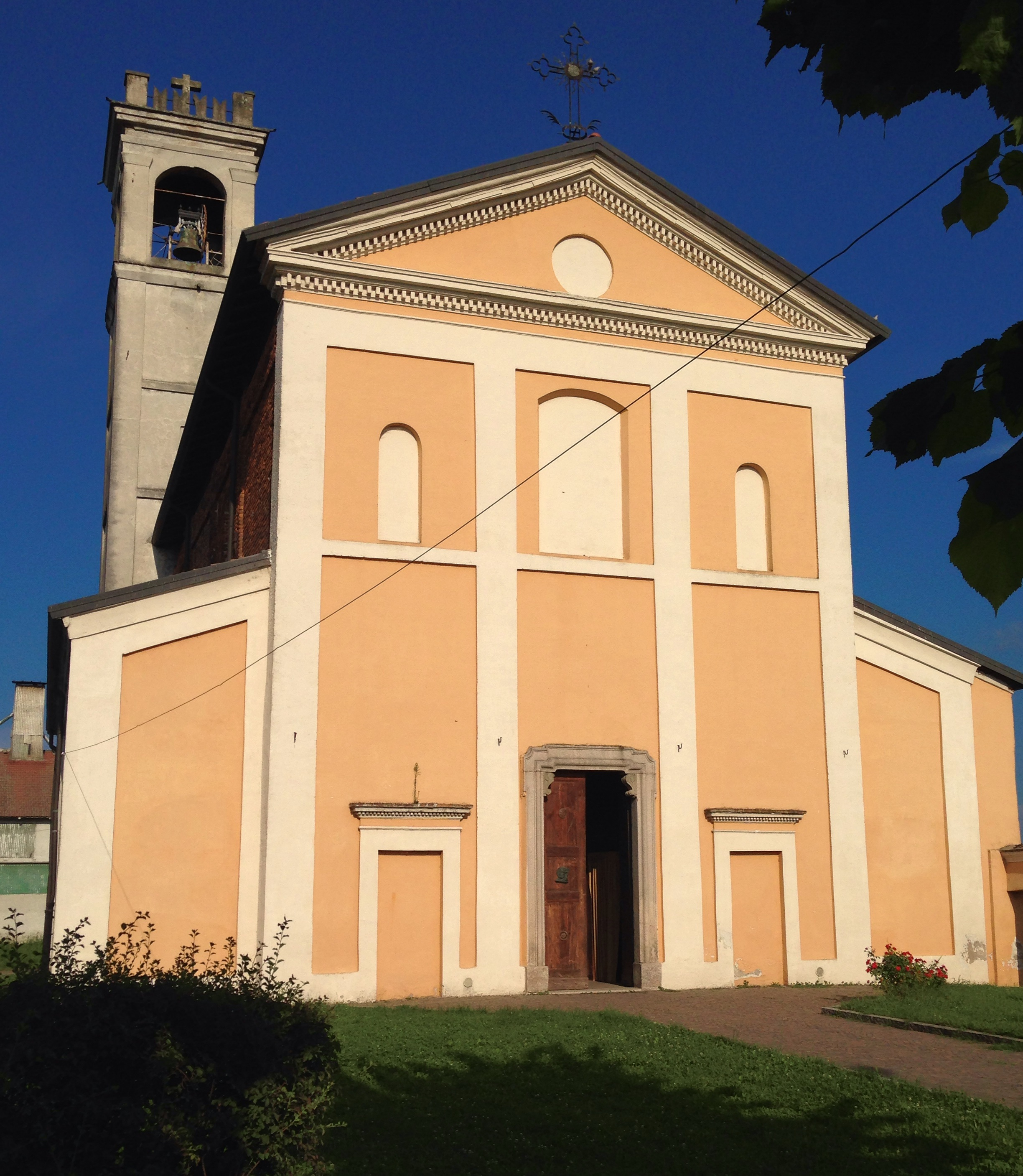
- The church of Santi Pietro and Paolo, in the frazione of Tainate

- Location within Italy Location within Lombardy
- Coordinates: 45°22′N 9°3′E
- Country: Italy
- Region: Lombardy
- Metropolitan city: Milan (MI)

Area
  - Total: 15.6 km^{2} (6.0 sq mi)
- Elevation: 103 m (338 ft)

Population (Dec. 2004)
  - Total: 3,456
  - Density: 222/km^{2} (574/sq mi)
- Demonym: Novigliesi
- Time zone: UTC+1 (CET)
  - Summer (DST): UTC+2 (CEST)
- Postal code: 20082
- Dialing code: 02
- Website: Official website

Noviglio (Milanese: Novèj) is a comune in the Province of Milan in the Italian region Lombardy, located about 14 kilometres (9 mi) southwest of Milan. As of 31 December 2004, it had a population of 3,456 and an area of 15.6 square kilometres (6.0 mi^{2}).

Noviglio borders the following municipalities: Gaggiano, Zibido San Giacomo, Rosate, Rosate, Vernate, Vernate, Binasco.

== Demographic evolution ==
Historical population

Year	Pop.	±%
1861	1,374	—
1871	1,350	−1.7%
1881	1,268	−6.1%
1901	1,349	+6.4%
1911	1,204	−10.7%

Year	Pop.	±%
1921	1,167	−3.1%
1931	1,112	−4.7%
1936	1,068	−4.0%
1951	1,187	+11.1%
1961	943	−20.6%

Year	Pop.	±%
1971	1,006	+6.7%
1981	1,324	+31.6%
1991	2,183	+64.9%
2001	3,025	+38.6%

Source: Data from ISTAT
