= Maddalena Carini =

Founder of the Famiglia dell'Ave Maria

Servant of God Maddalena Carini
- Born: 1 March 1917; Bereguardo, Pavia, Kingdom of Italy
- Died: 26 January 1998 (aged 80); Sanremo, Imperia, Italy

Maddalena Carini (1 March 1917 – 26 January 1998) was an Italian Roman Catholic and the founder of the Famiglia dell'Ave Maria, a lay association whose chief aim is to bring close those who are distant. Carini is best known for her miraculous cure in Lourdes from tuberculosis that she had had since she was a child – a miracle that received the approval of the Archbishop of Milan Giovanni Battista Montini, the future Pope Paul VI.

Carini's cure in 1948 made her the first Italian woman who was cured at Lourdes and whose case was accepted as a miraculous healing.

The beatification process commenced on 11 April 2014, and she became titled as a Servant of God.

== Life ==
Maddalena Carini was born on 1 March 1917 in Pavia as the last of seven children to Giuseppe Carini and Francesca Bianchi Martina. Her father died in 1930, and her mother died in 1943.

Carini developed an aggressive form of tuberculosis in 1927 in the pleura and the peritoneum and so had to spend long periods of time in a sanatorium until 1937. This ailment was known to have run through the generations. She was operated on at the age of eighteen for appendicitis coupled with peritonitis, and was treated at home until 1945 with little to no improvement. In 1945, she began another round of in-patient care in Pavia for tuberculosis in both the pericardium and the right femur. She was found to be a trochanteric in 1946.

Doctor Bonizzi approved her leaving for Lourdes despite the fact that she had asked numerous doctors for their signed approval – this never materialised, for her condition was considered too docile for her to travel. A medical report issued at this point described her incurable state and recorded her weight as being at 32kg. Carini departed Milan for Lourdes on 9 August 1948. On 15 August 1948, in Lourdes, she experienced an instantaneous cure, with what was perceived as notable improvement, but did not speak of it until 16 August on the return home on the train.

Doctors ratified the lasting nature of this cure and, in August 1949, ruled that the cure went against "all logical reasoning", taking her past medical records into account. Carini began to attend a medical bureau in that same month, and in September 1950, for further assessment. The medical board there recognised her inexplicable cure and sent its findings to the National Medical Committee for further evaluation. The committee, on the evidence of Dr. Lanos' report, confirmed the bureau's findings on 4 March 1951, while a dossier on the case was given to the Archdiocese of Milan during the episcopate of Cardinal Alfredo Ildefonso Schuster. His successor, Giovanni Battista Montini (the future Pope Paul VI), revitalised the case and submitted it to a canonical commission in March 1960 for their assessment.

The commission re-examined the case and presented a favourable report to Cardinal Montini on 2 June 1960, which allowed him to record that Carini's cure was indeed "a miraculous fact".

The group that Carini desired to establish materialised in '50 in the establishment of the Famiglia dell'Ave Maria and the diocesan approval of the Bishop of Pavia Carlo Allorio in 1958.

On the morning of 11 December 1978, she failed to get out of bed and, due to illness, was forced to spend most of the remainder of her life confined to her bed.

Maddalena Carini died in 1998. Her funeral was celebrated less than a week after her death.

== Beatification process ==
The beatification process commenced in a diocesan process that opened on 4 September 2013. The formal introduction of the cause came under Pope Francis on 11 April 2014 after the Congregation for the Causes of Saints declared the "nihil obstat" ('nothing against') to the cause itself.

The postulator appointed to the cause is Dr. Giorgio Igliozzi.
