= Trivolzio =

Trivolzio Trivóls
- Comune
- Comune di Trivolzio
- Location within Italy Location within Lombardy
- Coordinates: 45°16′N 9°3′E
- Country: Italy
- Region: Lombardy
- Province: Province of Pavia (PV)

Area
  - Total: 3.9 km^{2} (1.5 sq mi)
- Elevation: 97 m (318 ft)

Population (Dec. 2004)
  - Total: 1,333
  - Density: 340/km^{2} (890/sq mi)
- Time zone: UTC+1 (CET)
  - Summer (DST): UTC+2 (CEST)
- Postal code: 27020
- Dialing code: 0382

Trivolzio (Western Lombard: Trivóls) is a comune (municipality) in the Province of Pavia in the Italian region Lombardy, located about 25 km (16 mi) southwest of Milan and about 12 km (7.5 mi) northwest of Pavia. As of 31 December 2004, it had a population of 1,333 and an area of 3.9 km^{2} (1.5 sq mi).

Trivolzio borders the following municipalities: Battuda, Bereguardo, Marcignago, Torre d'Isola, Trovo.

The physician and later friar Saint Riccardo Pampuri was born in Trivolzio.

== Demographic evolution ==
Historical population

Year	Pop.	±%
1861	656	—
1871	979	+49.2%
1881	994	+1.5%
1901	1,175	+18.2%
1911	1,151	−2.0%

Year	Pop.	±%
1921	1,089	−5.4%
1931	1,045	−4.0%
1936	1,021	−2.3%
1951	1,035	+1.4%
1961	997	−3.7%

Year	Pop.	±%
1971	992	−0.5%
1981	1,037	+4.5%
1991	1,084	+4.5%
2001	1,204	+11.1%

Source: Data from ISTAT
