= Trovo =

- Comune
- Comune di Trovo
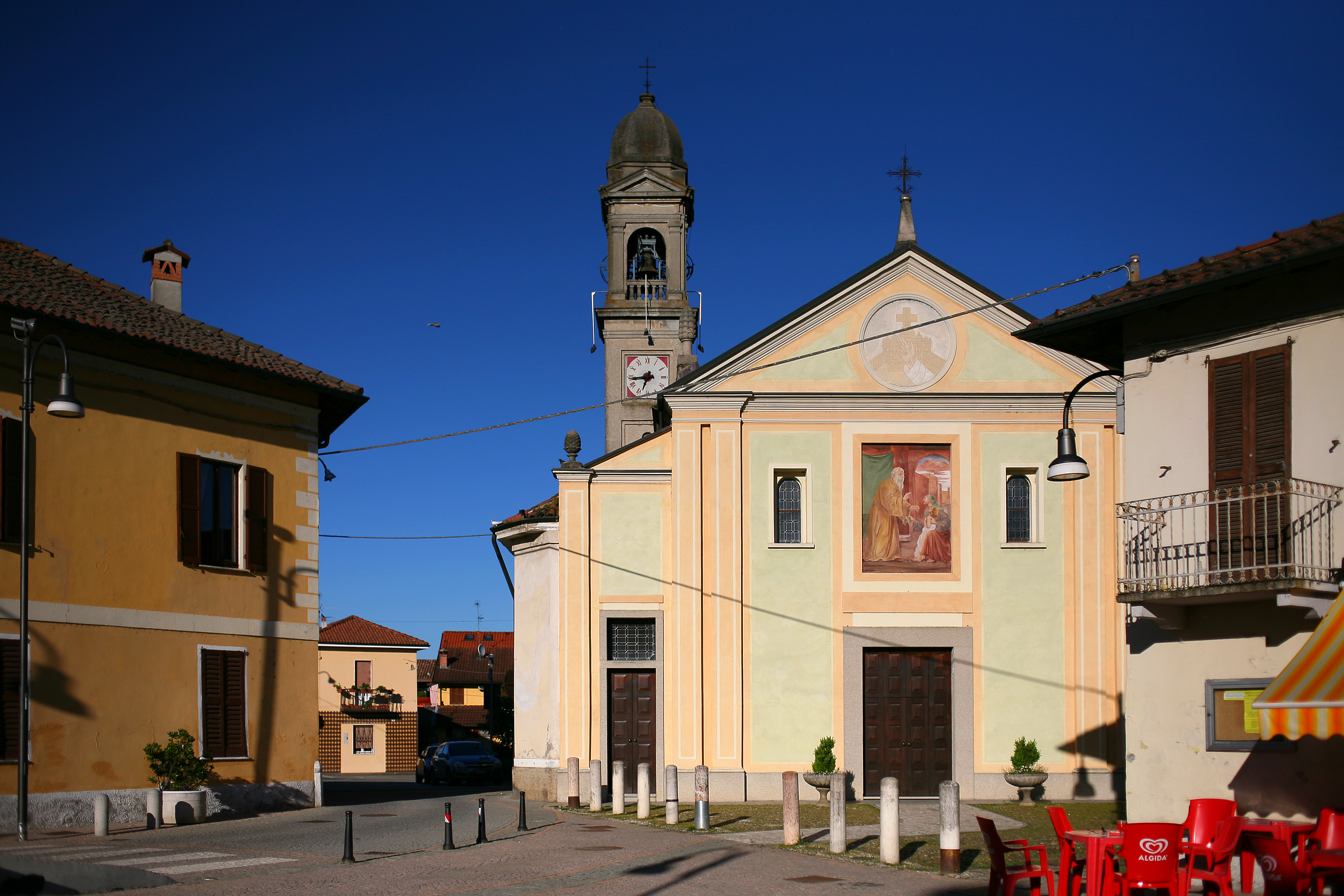
- The parish church, dedicated to San Biagio

- Trovo in the Province of Pavia

- Location within Italy Location within Lombardy
- Coordinates: 45°17′N 9°2′E
- Country: Italy
- Region: Lombardy
- Province: Pavia (PV)

Government
  - Mayor: Mattia Sacchi

Area
  - Total: 8.16 km^{2} (3.15 sq mi)
- Elevation: 97 m (318 ft)

Population (28 February 2017)
  - Total: 1,012
  - Density: 124/km^{2} (321/sq mi)
- Demonym: Trovesi
- Time zone: UTC+1 (CET)
  - Summer (DST): UTC+2 (CEST)
- Postal code: 27020
- Dialing code: 0382
- Patron saint: St. Blaise
- Website: Official website

Trovo (Lombard: Tröv) is a comune (municipality) in the Province of Pavia in the Italian region of Lombardy, about 25 km (16 mi) southwest of Milan and 14 km (8.7 mi) northwest of Pavia.

Trovo borders the following municipalities: Battuda, Bereguardo, Casorate Primo, Motta Visconti, Rognano, Trivolzio, Vernate.
