= Battuda =

- Comune
- Comune di Battuda
- Location within Italy Location within Lombardy
- Coordinates: 45°16′N 9°5′E
- Country: Italy
- Region: Lombardy
- Province: Pavia (PV)

Government
  - Mayor: Luigi Santagostini

Area
  - Total: 7.14 km^{2} (2.76 sq mi)
- Elevation: 98 m (322 ft)

Population (28 February 2017)
  - Total: 656
  - Density: 91.9/km^{2} (238/sq mi)
- Demonym: Battudini
- Time zone: UTC+1 (CET)
  - Summer (DST): UTC+2 (CEST)
- Postal code: 27020
- Dialing code: 0382
- Website: Official website

Battuda is a comune (municipality) in the Province of Pavia in the Italian region Lombardy, located about 25 km (16 mi) southwest of Milan and about 11 km (6.8 mi) northwest of Pavia.

Battuda borders the following municipalities: Marcignago, Rognano, Trivolzio, Trovo, Vellezzo Bellini.
