= Rognano =

- Comune
- Comune di Rognano
- Rognano in the Province of Pavia

- Location within Italy Location within Lombardy
- Coordinates: 45°17′N 9°5′E
- Country: Italy
- Region: Lombardy
- Province: Province of Pavia (PV)

Area
  - Total: 9.2 km^{2} (3.6 sq mi)
- Elevation: 95 m (312 ft)

Population (Dec. 2004)
  - Total: 308
  - Density: 33/km^{2} (87/sq mi)
- Demonym: Rognanesi
- Time zone: UTC+1 (CET)
  - Summer (DST): UTC+2 (CEST)
- Postal code: 27012
- Dialing code: 0382
- Website: Official website

Rognano is a comune (municipality) in the Province of Pavia in the Italian region Lombardy, located about 20 km (12 mi) southwest of Milan and about 12 km (7.5 mi) northwest of Pavia. As of 31 December 2004, it had a population of 308 and an area of 9.2 km^{2} (3.6 sq mi).

Rognano borders the following municipalities: Battuda, Casarile, Giussago, Trovo, Vellezzo Bellini, Vernate.

== Demographic evolution ==
Historical population

Year	Pop.	±%
1861	789	—
1871	777	−1.5%
1881	783	+0.8%
1901	752	−4.0%
1911	668	−11.2%

Year	Pop.	±%
1921	704	+5.4%
1931	526	−25.3%
1936	531	+1.0%
1951	548	+3.2%
1961	366	−33.2%

Year	Pop.	±%
1971	154	−57.9%
1981	134	−13.0%
1991	107	−20.1%
2001	194	+81.3%

Source: Data from ISTAT
