= Naviglio di Bereguardo =

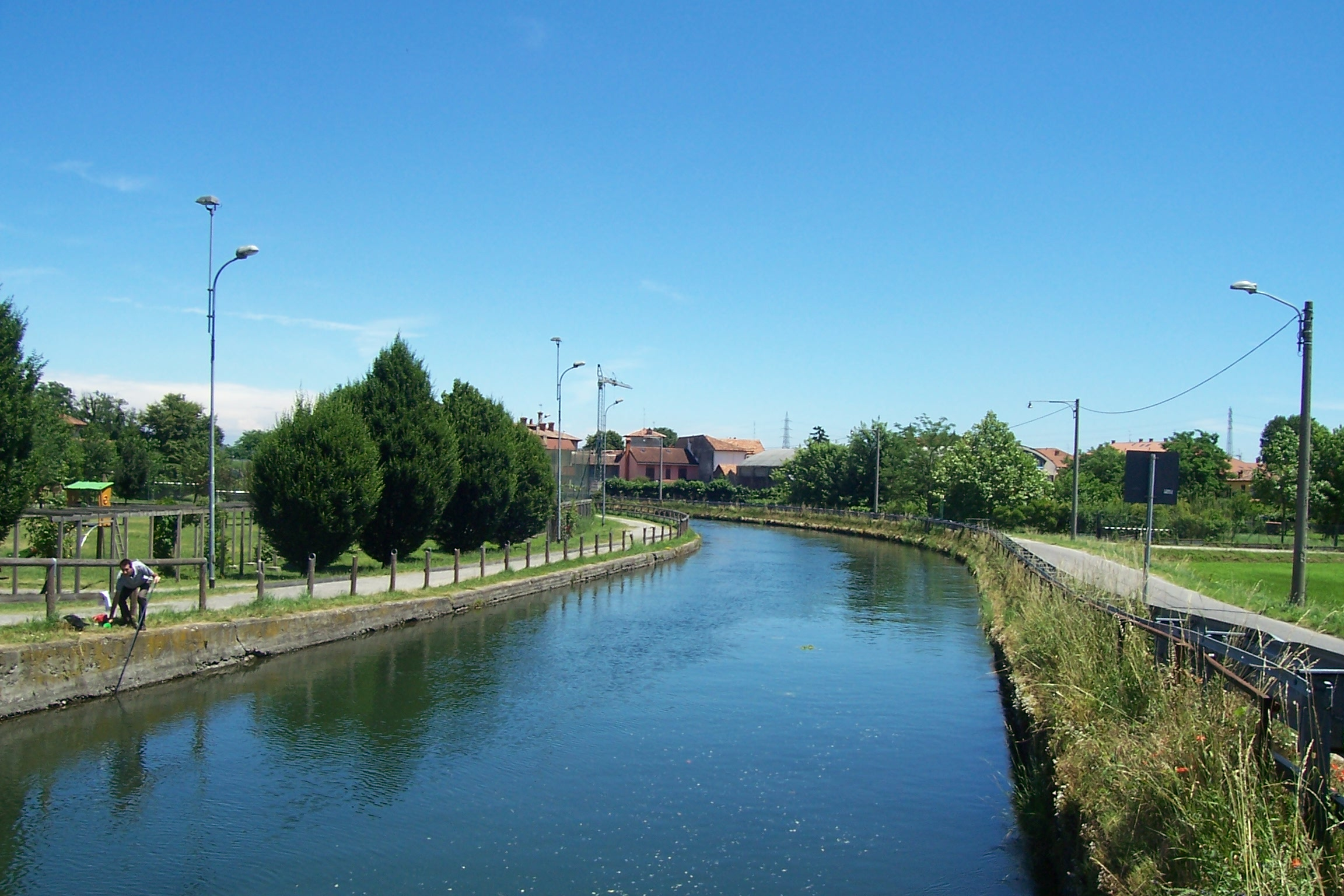
- Part of the canal
- Interactive map of Naviglio di Bereguardo

Specifications
- Length: 19 km (12 mi)
- Locks: 18
- Maximum height above sea level: 24 m (79 ft)

History
- Principal engineer: Bertola da Novate

Geography
- Start point: Naviglio Grande at Abbiategrasso
- End point: Bereguardo

The Bereguardo Canal (Italian: Naviglio di Bereguardo) was a navigable canal, part of the Navigli system in Lombardy, Italy. A secondary branch of the Naviglio Grande, it diverges at Abbiategrasso, heading south to Bereguardo (a distance of about 18 kilometres or 11 miles). The Naviglio di Bereguardo, along with the Naviglio Grande and the Naviglio di Pavia, connect Milan to the Ticino, which then connects to the Po and eventually to the sea. The canals, called naviglio because they were navigable by boats, were an integral part of Milan's dominance over northern Italy, both as a means of transportation as well as agricultural irrigation and, eventually, hydraulic energy for manufacturing.

Construction on the canal began in 1420 and was completed in 1470. The principal engineer was Bertola da Novate (1410-1475), sponsored by Francesco Sforza, who constructed the 18 pound locks. The mitre gate, designed by da Novate, was a major improvement to the design of locks. Although da Novate was the first to introduce the concept in 1458, earlier drawings of the same design were done by Leonardo da Vinci.
