= Rosate =

Rosate Rosaa (Lombard)
- Comune
- Comune di Rosate
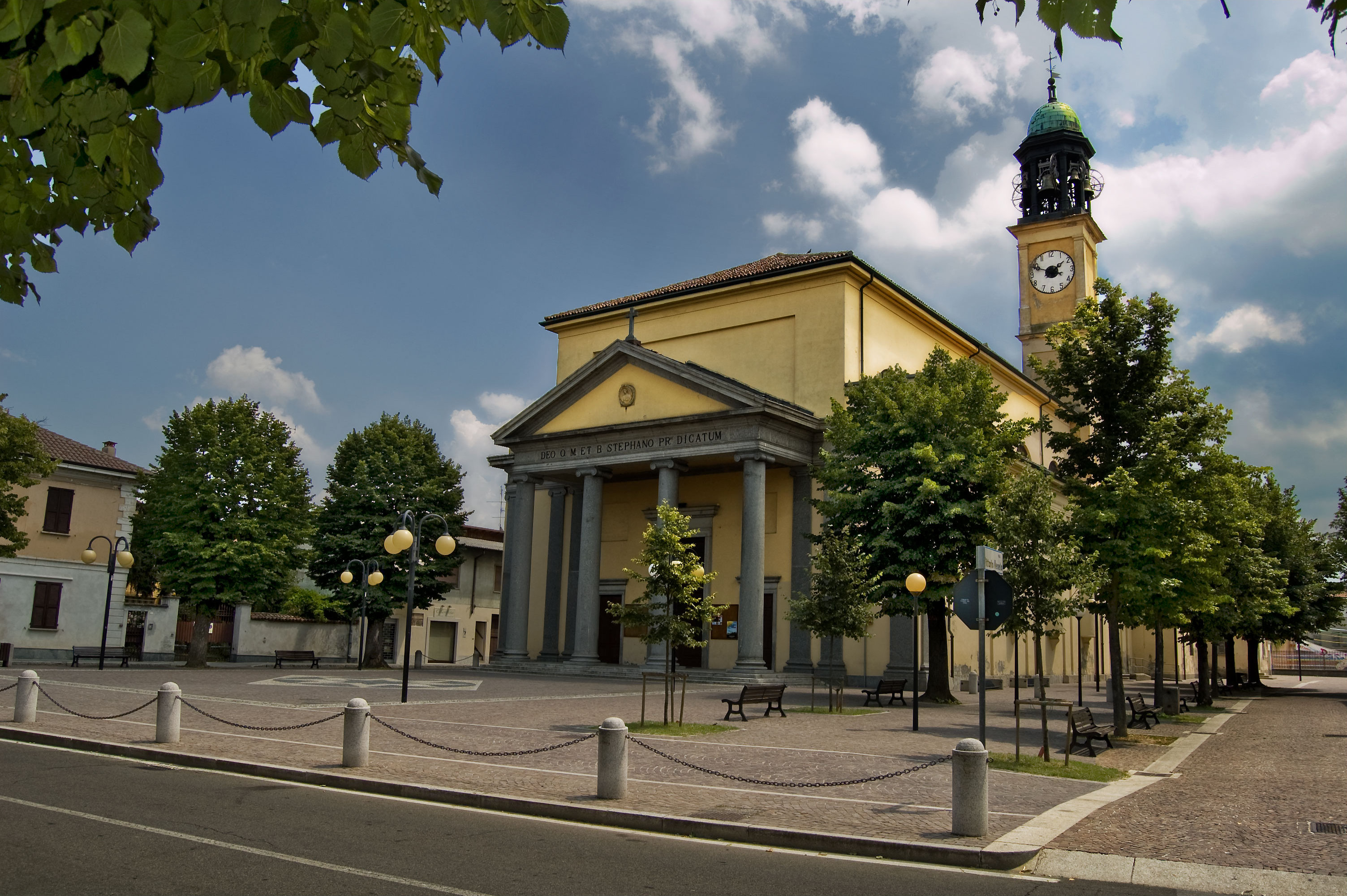
- Church of St. Stephen in Rosate.

- Coat of arms

- Location within Italy Location within Lombardy
- Coordinates: 45°20′N 9°1′E
- Country: Italy
- Region: Lombardy
- Metropolitan city: Milan (MI)
- Frazioni: Cavoletto

Government
  - Mayor: Daniele Del Ben

Area
  - Total: 18.7 km^{2} (7.2 sq mi)
- Elevation: 107 m (351 ft)

Population (1 January 2015)
  - Total: 5,590
  - Density: 299/km^{2} (774/sq mi)
- Demonym: Rosatesi or Rosatini
- Time zone: UTC+1 (CET)
  - Summer (DST): UTC+2 (CEST)
- Postal code: 20088
- Dialing code: 02
- Website: Official website

Rosate (Milanese: Rosaa [ruˈzaː]) is a comune (municipality) in the Metropolitan City of Milan in the Italian region Lombardy, located about 20 kilometres (12 mi) southwest of Milan.

Rosate borders the following municipalities: Gaggiano, Gudo Visconti, Besate, Noviglio, Morimondo, Vernate, Bubbiano, Calvignasco.

== Notable people ==
- Albericus de Rosate (c. 1290–1354 or 1360), jurist

== Twin towns ==
Rosate is twinned with:

- Gmina Tarnowo Podgórne, Poland
- Rohrdorf, Bavaria, Germany
