= Vellezzo Bellini =

- Comune
- Comune di Vellezzo Bellini
- Location within Italy Location within Lombardy
- Coordinates: 45°16′N 9°6′E
- Country: Italy
- Region: Lombardy
- Province: Province of Pavia (PV)

Area
  - Total: 7.9 km^{2} (3.1 sq mi)

Population (Dec. 2004)
  - Total: 2,565
  - Density: 320/km^{2} (840/sq mi)
- Demonym: Vellezzini
- Time zone: UTC+1 (CET)
  - Summer (DST): UTC+2 (CEST)
- Postal code: 27010
- Dialing code: 0382

Vellezzo Bellini is a comune (municipality) in the Province of Pavia in the Italian region Lombardy, located about 25 km (16 mi) south of Milan and about 10 km (6.2 mi) northwest of Pavia. As of 31 December 2004, it had a population of 2,565 and an area of 7.9 km^{2} (3.1 sq mi).

Vellezzo Bellini borders the following municipalities: Battuda, Certosa di Pavia, Giussago, Marcignago, Rognano.

== Demographic evolution ==
Historical population

Year	Pop.	±%
1861	1,302	—
1871	1,343	+3.1%
1881	1,373	+2.2%
1901	1,531	+11.5%
1911	1,494	−2.4%

Year	Pop.	±%
1921	1,509	+1.0%
1931	1,435	−4.9%
1936	1,439	+0.3%
1951	1,457	+1.3%
1961	1,322	−9.3%

Year	Pop.	±%
1971	1,225	−7.3%
1981	1,217	−0.7%
1991	1,268	+4.2%
2001	2,251	+77.5%

Source: Data from ISTAT
