= Motta Visconti =

- Comune
- Comune di Motta Visconti
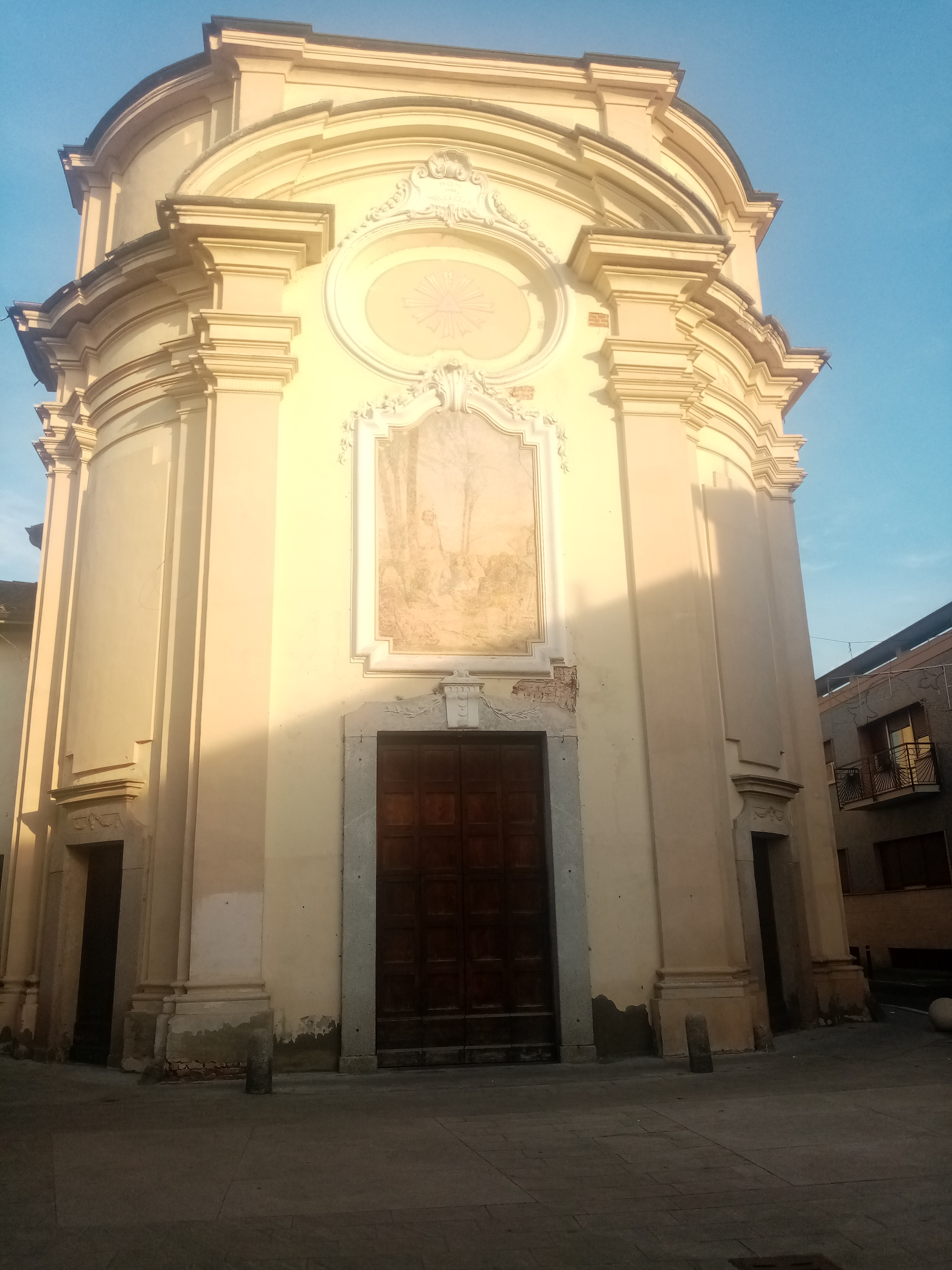
- Church of San Giovanni Battista

- Coat of arms

- Location within Italy Location within Lombardy
- Coordinates: 45°17′N 9°0′E
- Country: Italy
- Region: Lombardy
- Metropolitan city: Milan (MI)

Government
  - Mayor: Primo Paolo De Giuli

Area
  - Total: 10.51 km^{2} (4.06 sq mi)
- Elevation: 100 m (330 ft)

Population (30 November 2017)
  - Total: 7,985
  - Density: 759.8/km^{2} (1,968/sq mi)
- Demonym: Mottesi
- Time zone: UTC+1 (CET)
  - Summer (DST): UTC+2 (CEST)
- Postal code: 20086
- Dialing code: 02
- Patron saint: St. John the Evangelist
- Saint day: June 24
- Website: Official website

Motta Visconti (Milanese: La Motta [la ˈmɔta]) is a comune (municipality) in the Metropolitan City of Milan in the Italian region Lombardy, located about 25 kilometres (16 mi) southwest of Milan.

Motta Visconti borders the following municipalities: Vigevano, Casorate Primo, Besate, Trovo, Bereguardo.

== People ==
- Sante Geronimo Caserio (1873–1894), anarchist
