= Casarile =

- Comune
- Comune di Casarile
- Coat of arms

- Location within Italy Location within Lombardy
- Coordinates: 45°19′N 9°6′E
- Country: Italy
- Region: Lombardy
- Metropolitan city: Milan (MI)

Area
  - Total: 7.3 km^{2} (2.8 sq mi)

Population (Dec. 2004)
  - Total: 3,637
  - Density: 500/km^{2} (1,300/sq mi)
- Time zone: UTC+1 (CET)
  - Summer (DST): UTC+2 (CEST)
- Postal code: 20080
- Dialing code: 02

Casarile (Lombard: Casaril [kazaˈriːl]) is a comune (municipality) in the Province of Milan in the Italian region Lombardy, located about 15 kilometres (9 mi) southwest of Milan. As of 31 December 2004, it had a population of 3,637 and an area of 7.3 square kilometres (2.8 mi^{2}).

Casarile borders the following municipalities: Lacchiarella, Vernate, Binasco, Rognano, Giussago.

== Demographic evolution ==
Historical population

Year	Pop.	±%
1861	994	—
1871	917	−7.7%
1881	927	+1.1%
1901	1,007	+8.6%
1911	1,007	+0.0%

Year	Pop.	±%
1921	955	−5.2%
1931	995	+4.2%
1936	913	−8.2%
1951	1,035	+13.4%
1961	1,089	+5.2%

Year	Pop.	±%
1971	1,597	+46.6%
1981	1,754	+9.8%
1991	2,545	+45.1%
2001	3,572	+40.4%

Source: Data from ISTAT
