= Torre d'Isola =

Torre d'Isola Tur d'Isula
- Comune
- Comune di Torre d'Isola
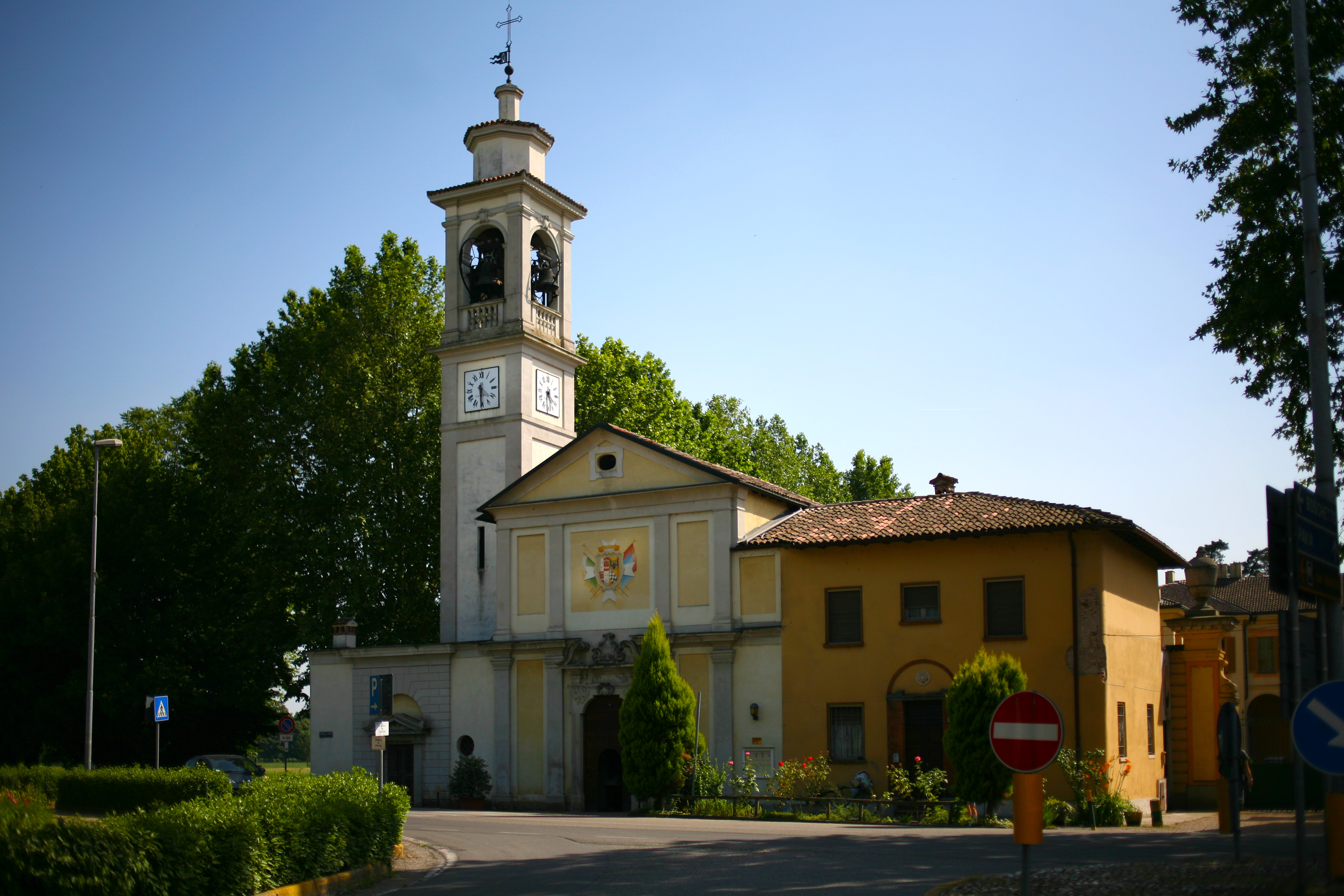
- Santa Maria della Neve church (16th century)

- Coat of arms

- Location within Italy Location within Lombardy
- Coordinates: 45°13′N 9°5′E
- Country: Italy
- Region: Lombardy
- Province: Province of Pavia (PV)
- Frazioni: Carpana, Casottole, Massaua, Sanvarese

Area
  - Total: 16.3 km^{2} (6.3 sq mi)
- Elevation: 84 m (276 ft)

Population (June 2008)
  - Total: 2,276
  - Density: 140/km^{2} (362/sq mi)
- Demonym: Torredisolani
- Time zone: UTC+1 (CET)
  - Summer (DST): UTC+2 (CEST)
- Postal code: 27020
- Dialing code: 0382

Torre d'Isola is a comune (municipality) in the Province of Pavia in the Italian region Lombardy, located about 30 km (19 mi) south of Milan and about 6 km (3.7 mi) northwest of Pavia. As of 30 June 2008, it had a population of 2,276 and an area of 16.3 km^{2} (6.3 sq mi).

The municipality of Torre d'Isola contains the frazioni (subdivisions, mainly villages and hamlets) Carpana, Casottole, Massaua, Santa Sofia and Sanvarese.

Torre d'Isola borders the following municipalities: Bereguardo, Carbonara al Ticino, Marcignago, Pavia, Trivolzio, Zerbolò.

== Demographic evolution ==
Historical population

Year	Pop.	±%
1861	1,298	—
1871	1,347	+3.8%
1881	1,530	+13.6%
1901	1,517	−0.8%
1911	1,455	−4.1%

Year	Pop.	±%
1921	1,498	+3.0%
1931	1,407	−6.1%
1936	1,447	+2.8%
1951	1,476	+2.0%
1961	1,336	−9.5%

Year	Pop.	±%
1971	1,140	−14.7%
1981	1,220	+7.0%
1991	1,334	+9.3%
2001	1,857	+39.2%

Source: Data from ISTAT
