= Rohrdorf, Bavaria =

Rohrdorf
- Municipality
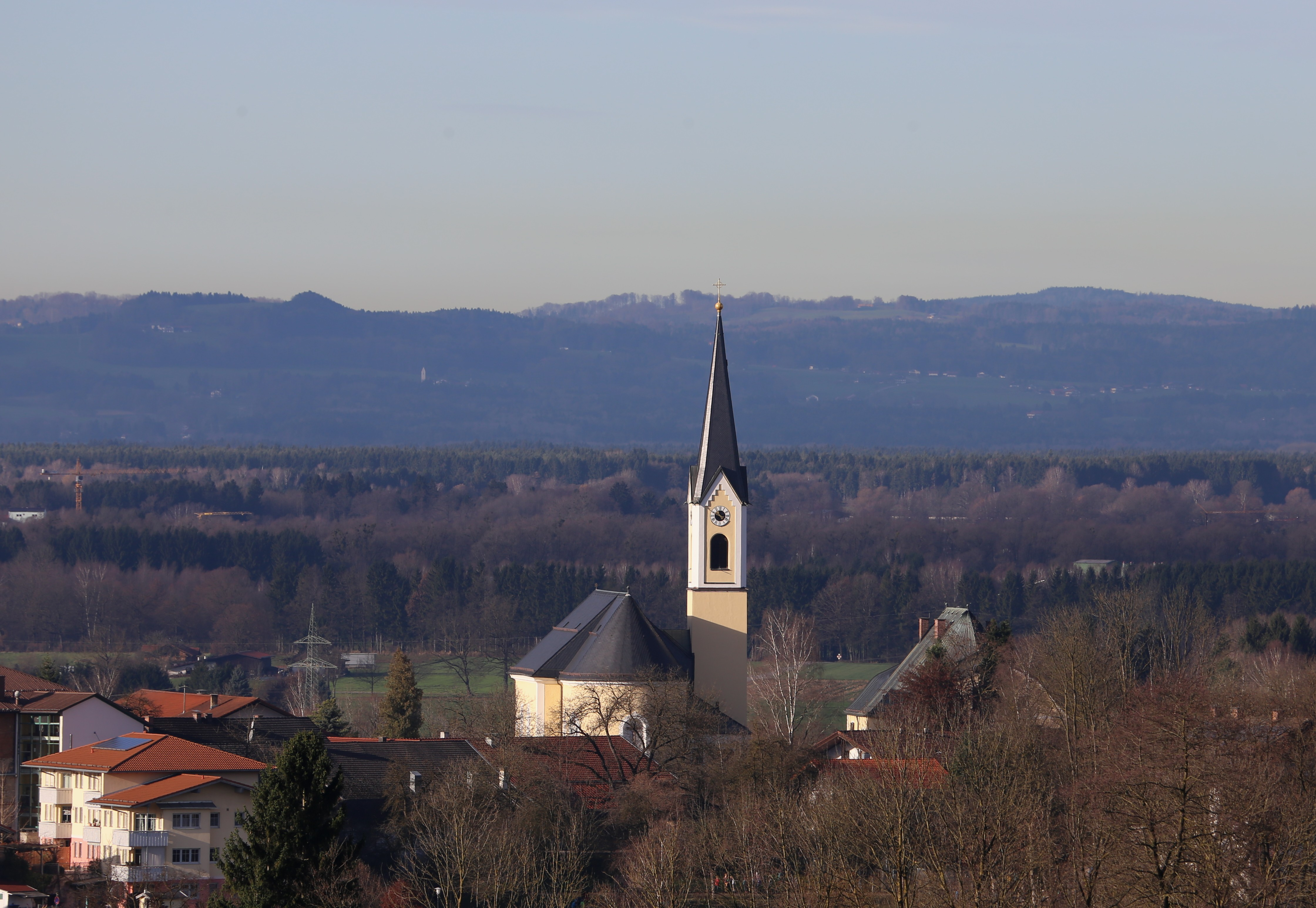
- Church of Saint James the Elder

- Flag Coat of arms

- Location of Rohrdorf within Rosenheim district
- Interactive map of Rohrdorf
- Location within Germany Location within Bavaria
- Coordinates: 47°47′56″N 12°10′3″E
- Country: Germany
- State: Bavaria
- Admin. region: Oberbayern
- District: Rosenheim
- Subdivisions: 5 Ortsteile

Government
  - Mayor (2020–26): Simon Hausstetter

Area
  - Total: 28.65 km^{2} (11.06 sq mi)
- Elevation: 476 m (1,562 ft)

Population (2025-12-31)
  - Total: 5,835
  - Density: 203.7/km^{2} (527.5/sq mi)
- Time zone: UTC+01:00 (CET)
  - Summer (DST): UTC+02:00 (CEST)
- Postal codes: 83101
- Dialling codes: 08031, 08032
- Vehicle registration: RO
- Website: www.rohrdorf.de

Rohrdorf (German pronunciation: [ˈʁoːɐ̯dɔʁf]; Central Bavarian: Roudarf) is a municipality in the district of Rosenheim in Upper Bavaria, Germany. It is located in the Inn valley.

== History ==
Rohrdorf was first mentioned in 788 in the notitia arnonis.

Evidence of prehistoric settlement in the village has been found.

During World War II, a subcamp of Dachau concentration camp was located here.

== Twin towns ==
- Rosate, Italy
- Schattendorf, Austria
- Tarnowo Podgórne, Poland
