= Marcignago =

- Comune
- Comune di Marcignago
- Location within Italy Location within Lombardy
- Coordinates: 45°15′N 9°5′E
- Country: Italy
- Region: Lombardy
- Province: Province of Pavia (PV)

Area
  - Total: 10.1 km^{2} (3.9 sq mi)

Population (Dec. 2004)
  - Total: 2,155
  - Density: 213/km^{2} (553/sq mi)
- Demonym: Marcignaghini
- Time zone: UTC+1 (CET)
  - Summer (DST): UTC+2 (CEST)
- Postal code: 27020
- Dialing code: 0382

Marcignago is a comune (municipality) in the Province of Pavia in the Italian region Lombardy, located about 25 km (16 mi) southwest of Milan and about 9 km (5.6 mi) northwest of Pavia. As of 31 December 2004, it had a population of 2,155 and an area of 10.1 km^{2} (3.9 sq mi).

Marcignago borders the following municipalities: Battuda, Certosa di Pavia, Pavia, Torre d'Isola, Trivolzio, Vellezzo Bellini.

== Demographic evolution ==
Historical population

Year	Pop.	±%
1861	1,570	—
1871	1,661	+5.8%
1881	1,821	+9.6%
1901	1,927	+5.8%
1911	1,938	+0.6%

Year	Pop.	±%
1921	1,919	−1.0%
1931	1,821	−5.1%
1936	1,828	+0.4%
1951	1,895	+3.7%
1961	1,755	−7.4%

Year	Pop.	±%
1971	1,543	−12.1%
1981	1,548	+0.3%
1991	1,468	−5.2%
2001	1,923	+31.0%

Source: Data from ISTAT
