= Veronica of Milan =

Italian nun in the Augustinian Order

Blessed Veronica of Milan
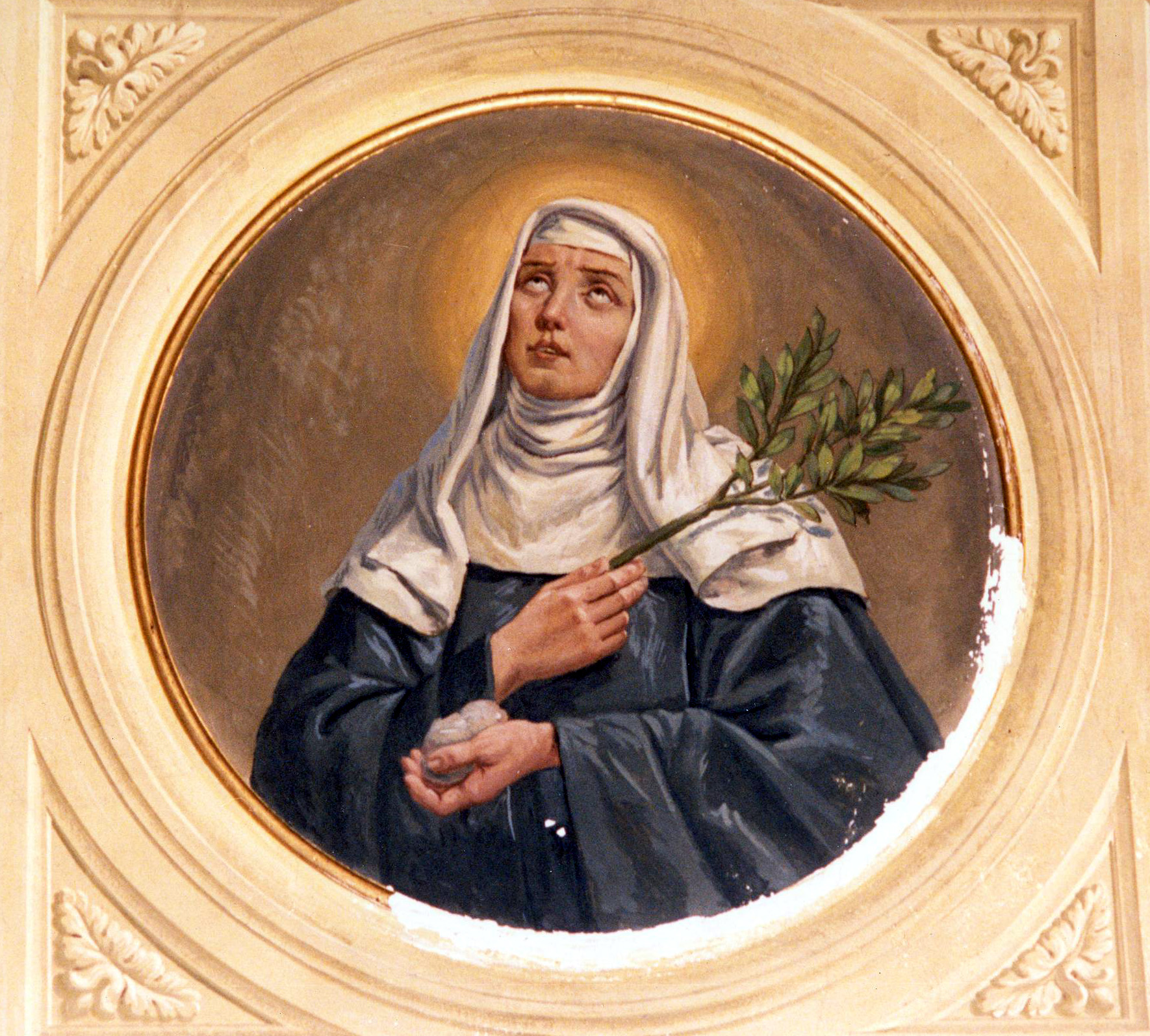
- Fresco by Luigi Migliavacca, Church of Turago Bordone

Nun
- Born: c. 1445; Binasco, Italy
- Died: 13 January 1497; Milan, Italy
- Venerated in: Roman Catholic Church
- Beatified: 1517 by Pope Leo X (cultus confirmed); 1672 by Pope Clement X (devotion extended universally)
- Feast: 13 January; 28 January (Augustinian Order)

Veronica of Milan (c. 1445 – 13 January 1497) was an Italian nun in the Augustinian Order. She was reputed to have received frequent visions of the Virgin Mary, and her local cultus was confirmed by Pope Leo X in 1517.

== Life ==
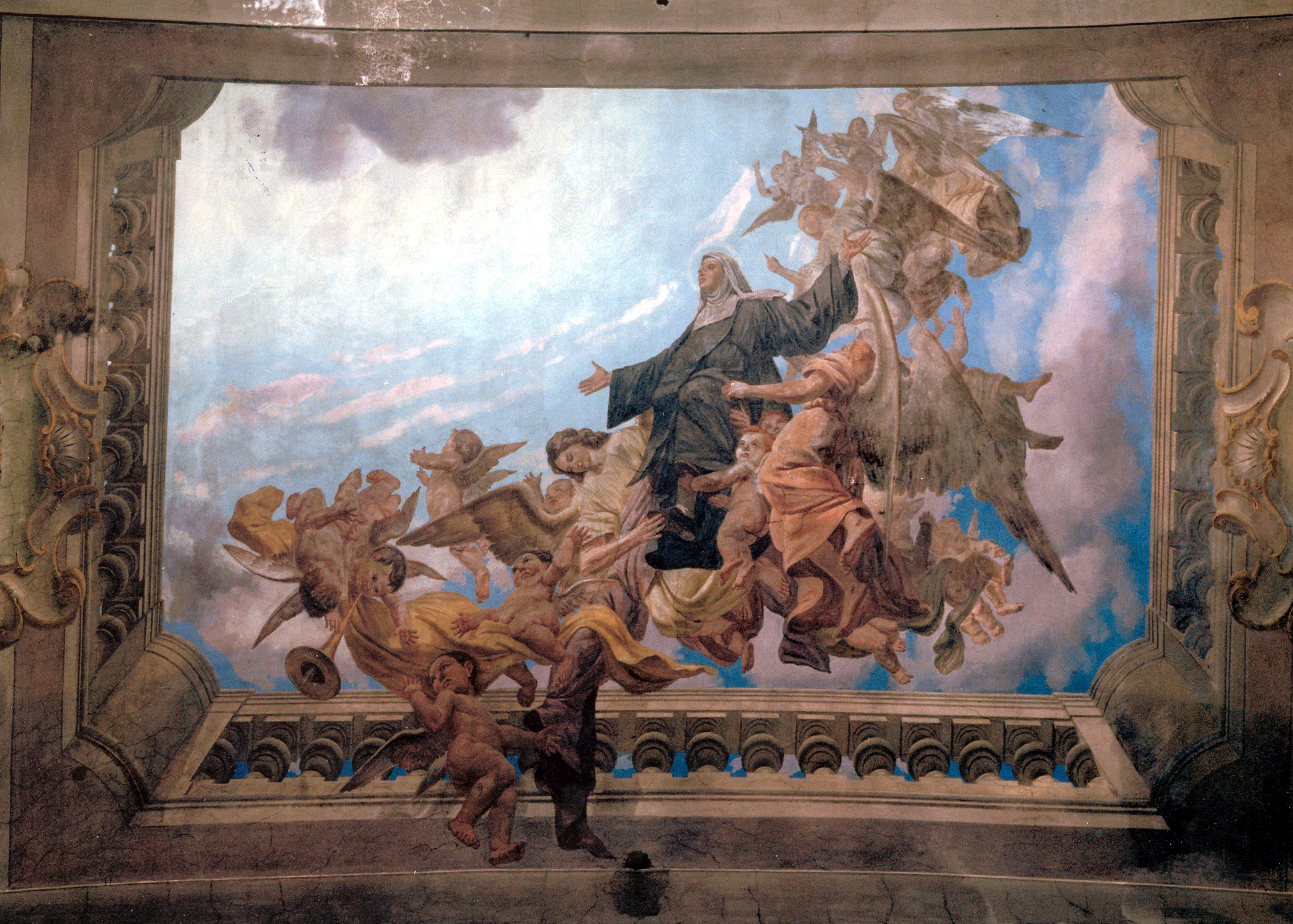
Assumption of St. Veronica of Milan, from the Church of Binasco

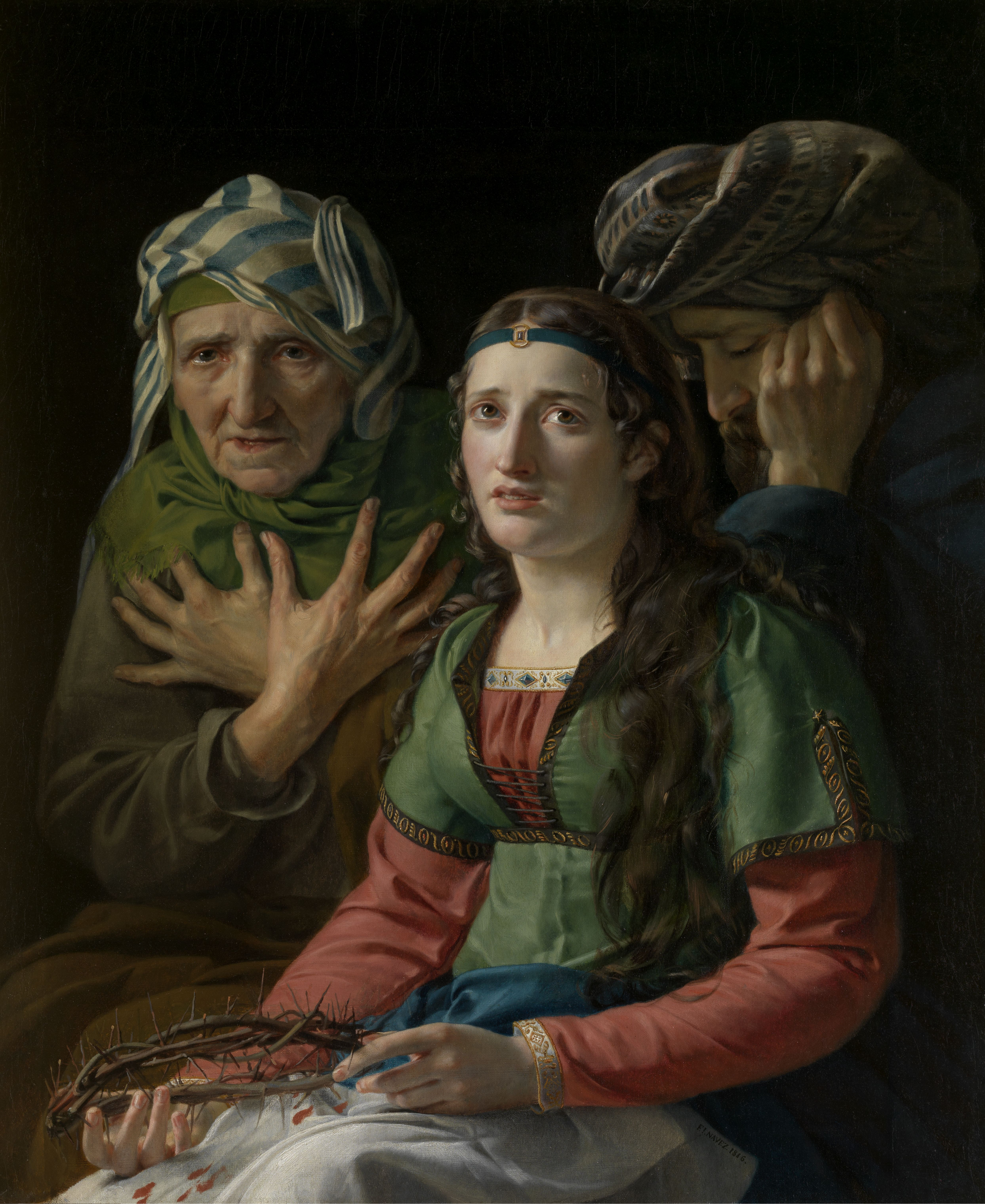
Saint Veronica of Binasco, François-Joseph Navez

Veronica grew up in the small town of Binasco, Italy, not far from Milan. She and her family were poor and she worked with her mother and father, doing chores and in the fields. Her parents set their daughter on the path to Christian virtues, as it was said that her father was a scrupulously honest man, never selling a horse without first disclosing its faults or imperfections to the buyer. As she developed a desire for saintliness and perfection, she became tired of the joking and songs of her companions, even hiding her head and weeping as she worked.

Having no formal education, she attempted, unsuccessfully, to teach herself to read. While making this effort one night, it is said that the Virgin Mary appeared to Veronica, telling her that while some of her pursuits were necessary, her reading was not. Instead, the Virgin taught her in the form of three mystical letters:

The first signified purity of intention; the second, abhorrence of murmuring or criticism; the third, daily meditation on the Passion. By the first she learned to begin her daily duties for no human motive, but for God alone; by the second, to carry out what she had thus begun by attending to her own affairs, never judging her neighbor, but praying for those who manifestly erred; by the third she was enabled to forget her own pains and sorrows in those of her Lord, and to weep hourly, but silently, over the memory of His wrongs.

— Alban Butler, Lives of the Saints

Veronica became accustomed to nearly constant apparitions and religious ecstasies. She saw scenes from the life of Christ, yet these never interrupted her work. She joined an Augustinian lay order at the convent of Saint Martha in Milan at the age of 22. This community was very poor; Veronica's job was to beg in the streets of the city for food. After three years into her vocation as a nun she became racked with secret bodily pains, but was notably patient and obedient to her superiors. She received a vision of Christ in 1494, and was given a message for Pope Alexander VI, and traveled to Rome to deliver it. After a six-month illness, Veronica died on the date she had predicted, 13 January 1497.

== Veneration ==
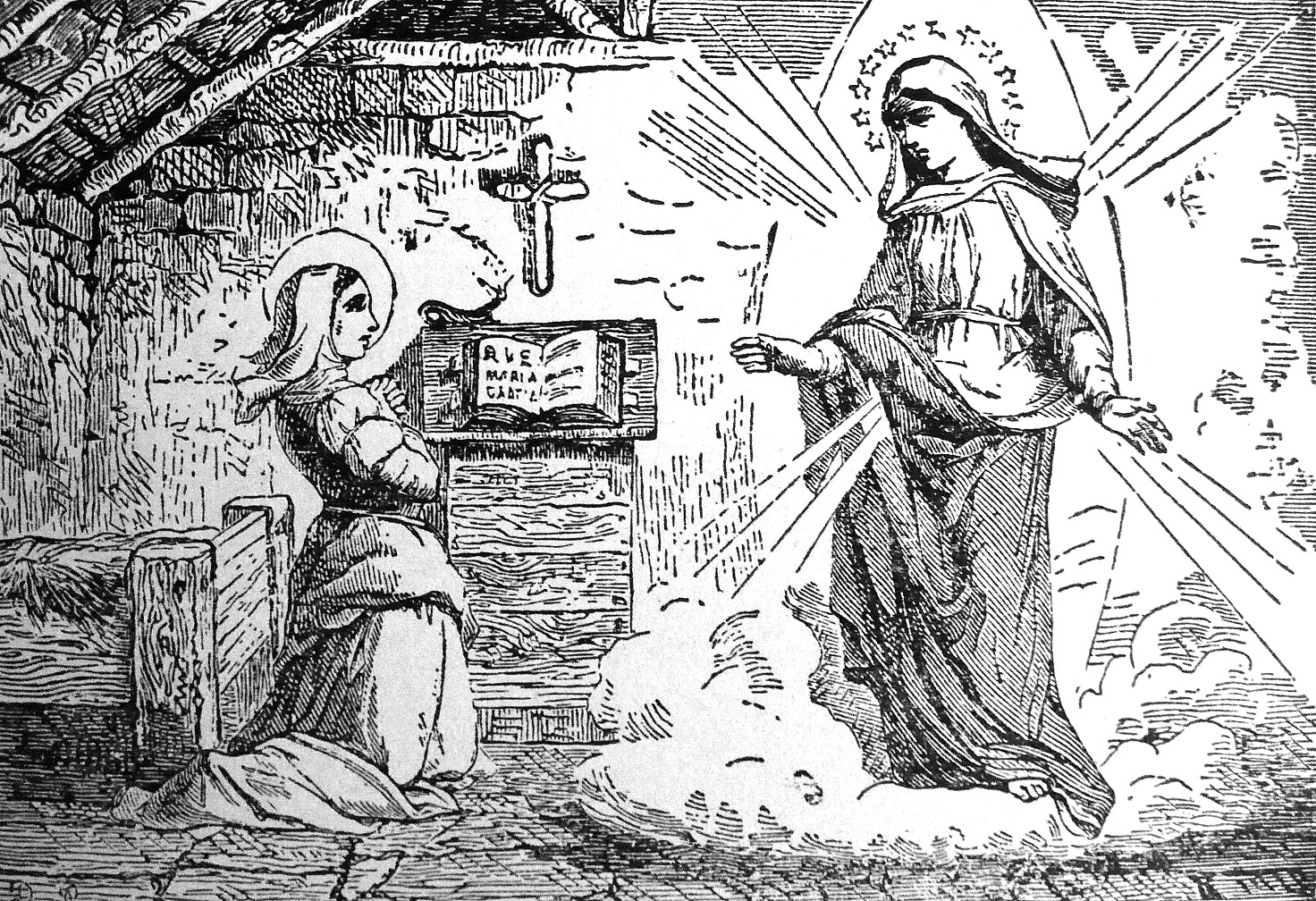
The Virgin Mary appears to Veronica from Little Pictorial Lives of the Saints by the Benziger Brothers, 1878

Veronica is remembered in the Augustinian Order for her obedience and desire for work. Butler records a remark she made to her sister nuns: "I must work while I can, while I have time." Miracles were attributed to her, and in a 1517 bulla, Pope Leo X permitted her veneration in her monastery as though she had been beatified according to the usual form. Veneration was extended to the entire church by Pope Clement X in 1672, and in 1749 her name was inserted into the Roman Martyrology for 13 January by Pope Benedict XIV, although her name appears in Augustinian records of the same year for 28 January.

== See also ==
- List of Catholic saints
- Religious ecstasy
