= Bereguardo =

- Comune
- Comune di Bereguardo
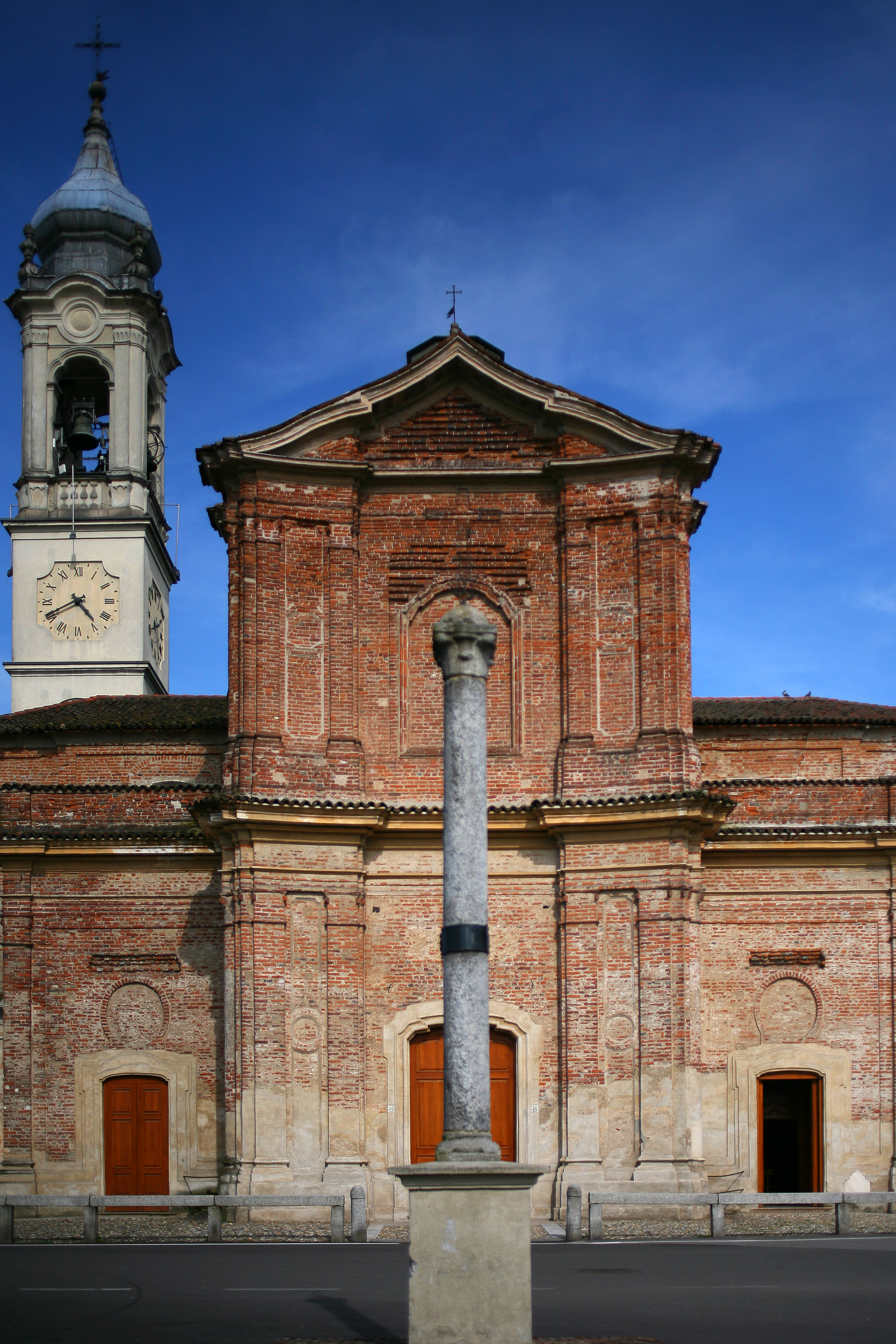
- Church of St. Antonio

- Flag Coat of arms

- Location within Italy Location within Lombardy
- Coordinates: 45°15′N 9°2′E
- Country: Italy
- Region: Lombardy
- Province: Pavia (PV)
- Frazioni: Casottole, Frutteto, Vigna del Pero, Villette, Zelata

Government
  - Mayor: Luigi Leone

Area
  - Total: 17.86 km^{2} (6.90 sq mi)
- Elevation: 98 m (322 ft)

Population (31 December 2021)
  - Total: 2,852
  - Density: 159.7/km^{2} (413.6/sq mi)
- Demonym: Bereguardini
- Time zone: UTC+1 (CET)
  - Summer (DST): UTC+2 (CEST)
- Postal code: 27021
- Dialing code: 0382
- Website: Official website

Bereguardo (Lombard: Balguàrt) is a comune (municipality) in the Province of Pavia in the Italian region Lombardy, located about 25 kilometres (16 mi) southwest of Milan and about 12 kilometres (7 mi) northwest of Pavia.

Bereguardo borders the following municipalities: Borgo San Siro, Motta Visconti, Torre d'Isola, Trivolzio, Trovo, Vigevano, Zerbolò.

The remnants of the moated 14th-century Castello di Bereguardo are now used for municipal offices.

== People ==
- Maddalena Carini (1917–1998), Italian Servant of God
