= Oldradus de Ponte =

Italian jurist

Oldradus de Ponte (died 1335) was an Italian jurist born in Lodi, active in the Roman curia in the early fourteenth century. Previously he had taught at the University of Padua.

According to Joseph Canning, he was an authority in both canon law and civil law, and his consilia (legal opinions) are the earliest surviving ones.

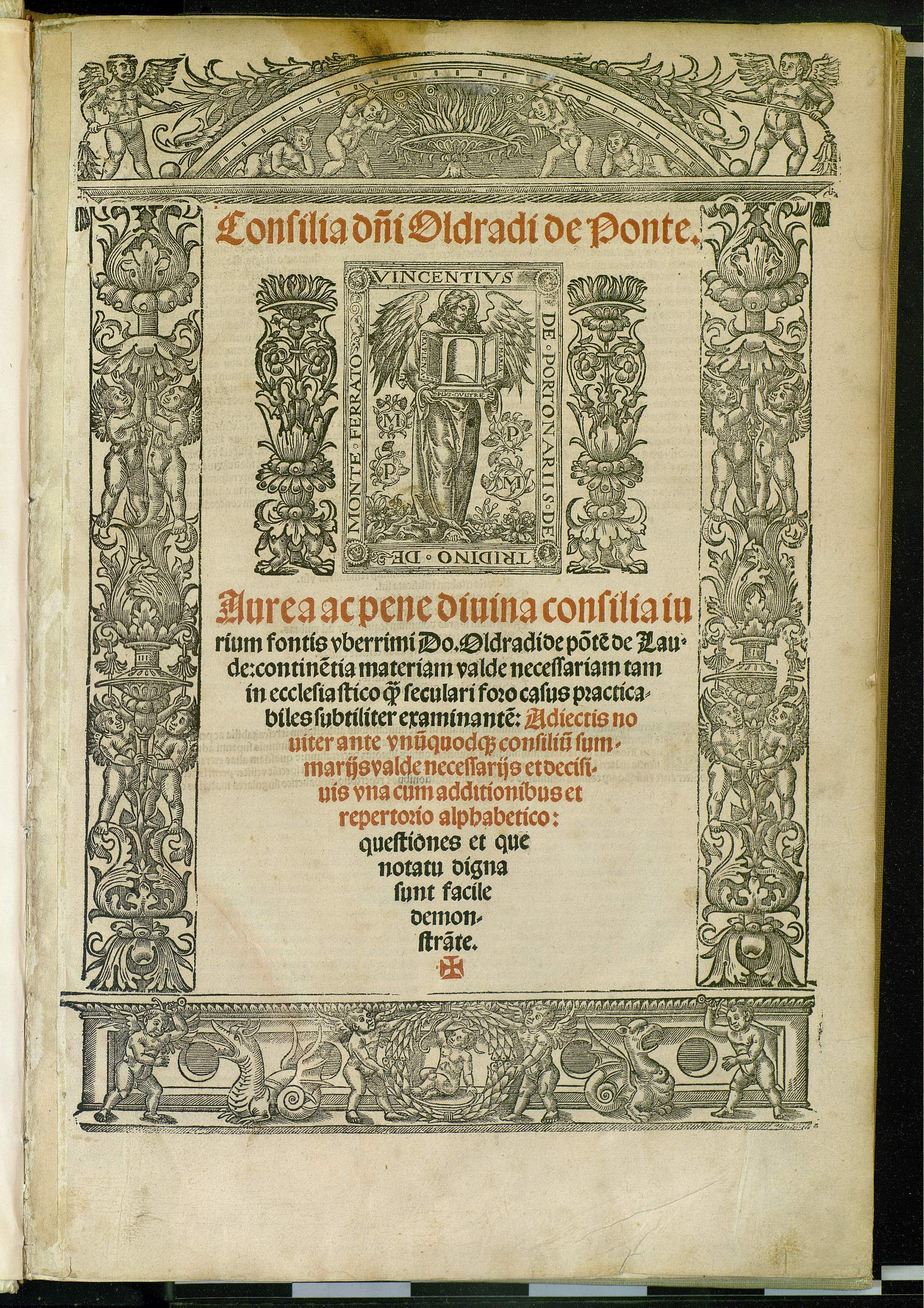
Consilia, 1506-1547

== Works ==
- Consilia (in Latin). Vincent de Portonariis. 1506–1547.
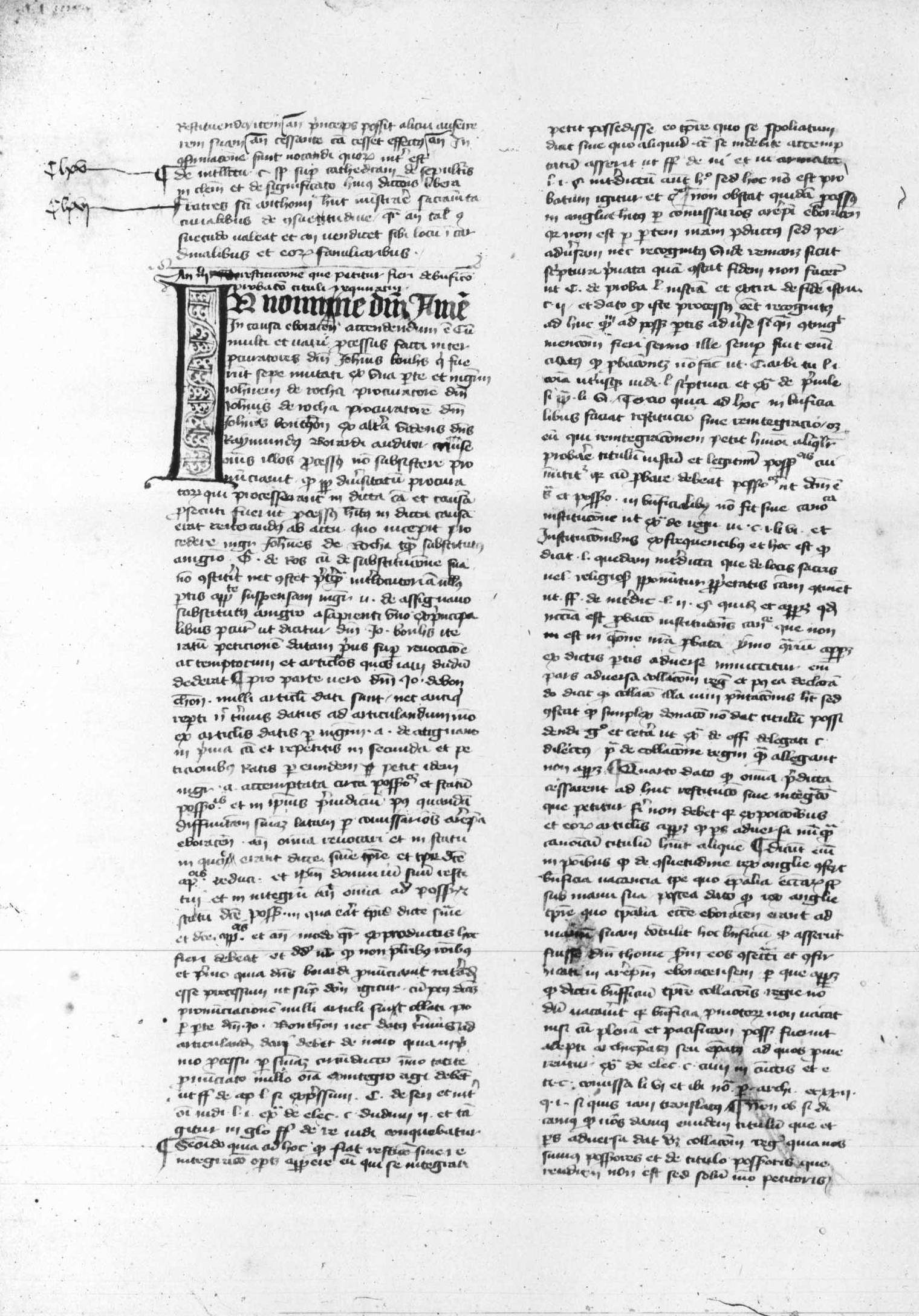
Consilia, 14th-15th-century manuscript. Bordeaux, Bibliothèque municipale.

== Bibliography ==
- Norman Zacour (1990), Jews and Saracens in the Consilia of Oldradus de Ponte
- Joseph Canning, A History of Medieval Political Thought. 1996
