= Vernate, Lombardy =

Vernate Vernaa (Lombard)
- Comune
- Comune di Vernate
- Location within Italy Location within Lombardy
- Coordinates: 45°19′N 9°4′E
- Country: Italy
- Region: Lombardy
- Metropolitan city: Milan (MI)
- Frazioni: Pasturago

Area
  - Total: 14.6 km^{2} (5.6 sq mi)

Population (Dec. 2004)
  - Total: 2,594
  - Density: 178/km^{2} (460/sq mi)
- Demonym: Vernatesi
- Time zone: UTC+1 (CET)
  - Summer (DST): UTC+2 (CEST)
- Postal code: 20082
- Dialing code: 02
- Website: Official website

Vernate (Milanese: Vernaa) is a comune (municipality) in the Province of Milan in the Italian region Lombardy, located about 20 kilometres (12 mi) southwest of Milan. As of 31 December 2004, it had a population of 2,594 and an area of 14.6 square kilometres (5.6 mi^{2}).

The municipality of Vernate contains the frazione (subdivision) Pasturago.

Vernate borders the following municipalities: Noviglio, Noviglio, Rosate, Rosate, Binasco, Calvignasco, Casarile, Casorate Primo, Rognano, Trovo.

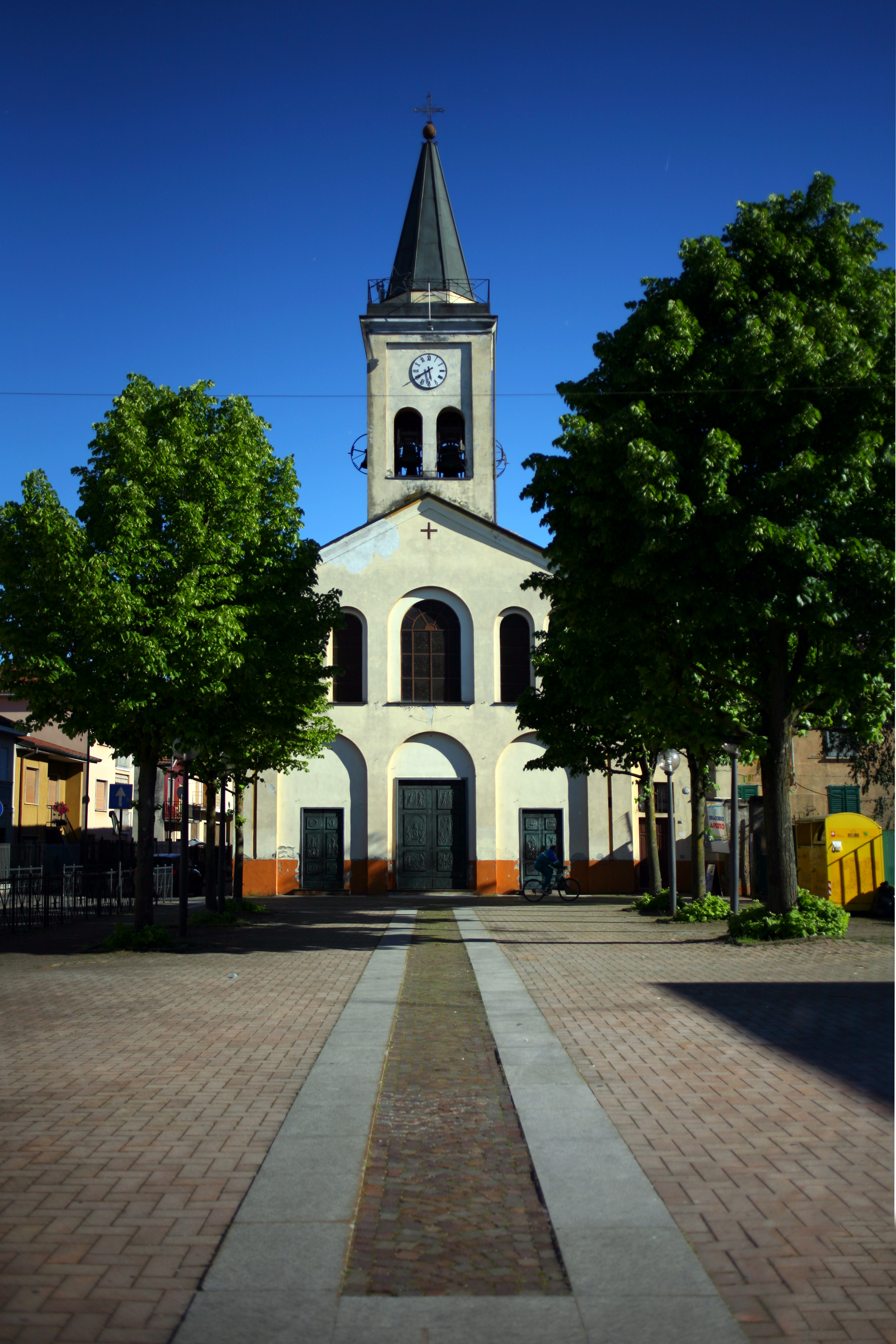
Santa Maria Nascente parish church in Moncucco, Milan

== Demographic evolution ==
Historical population

Year	Pop.	±%
1861	1,956	—
1871	1,905	−2.6%
1881	1,942	+1.9%
1901	2,109	+8.6%
1911	2,184	+3.6%

Year	Pop.	±%
1921	2,278	+4.3%
1931	2,029	−10.9%
1936	2,073	+2.2%
1951	2,173	+4.8%
1961	2,040	−6.1%

Year	Pop.	±%
1971	1,898	−7.0%
1981	1,979	+4.3%
1991	2,199	+11.1%
2001	2,345	+6.6%

Source: Data from ISTAT
