= Alcadozo =

- Municipality
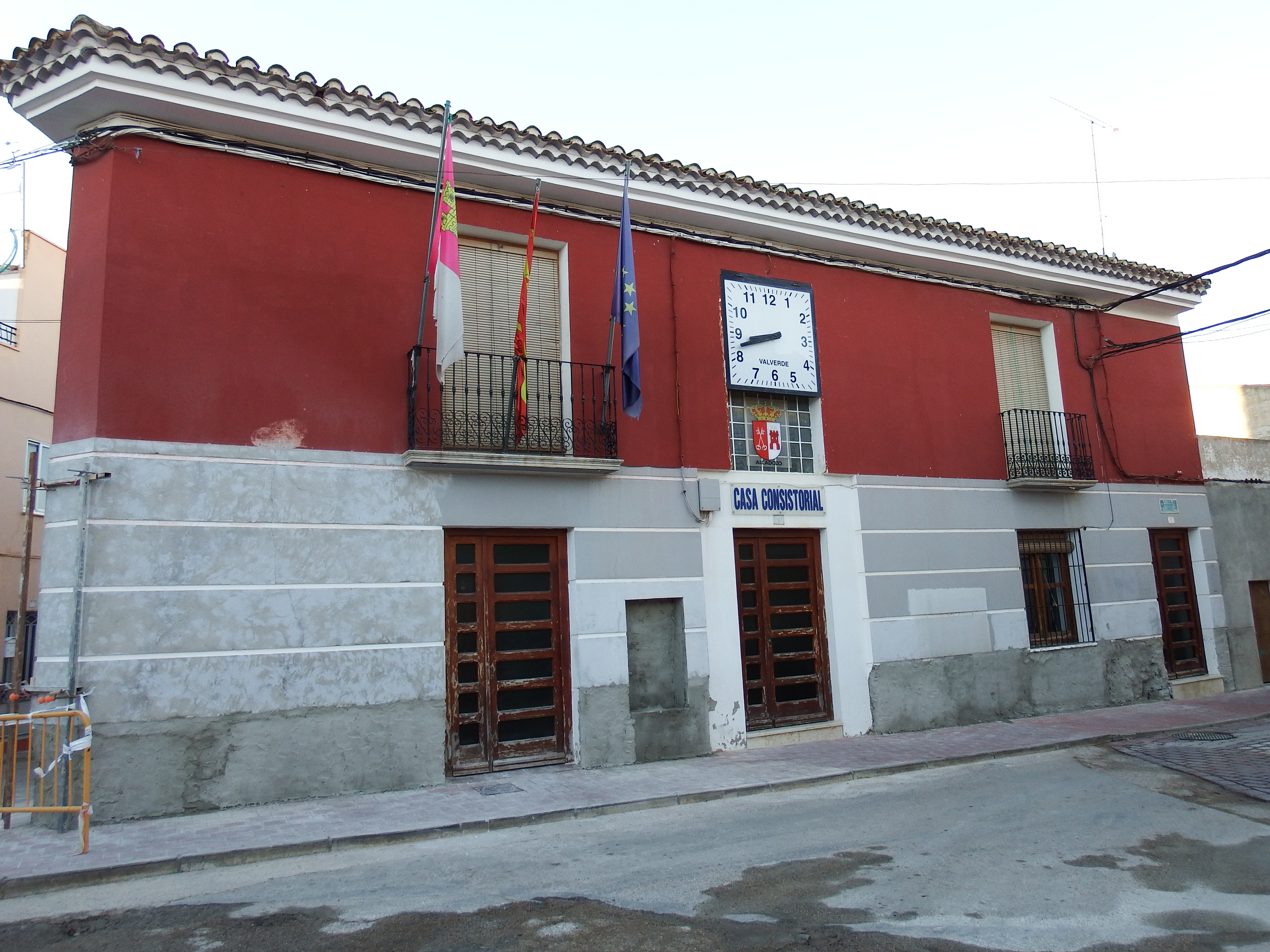
- Town hall of Alcadozo.

- Coat of arms

- Location of Alcadozo. Alcadozo (Castilla-La Mancha)
- Coordinates: 38°38′N 1°59′W
- Country: Spain
- Community: Castilla-La Mancha
- Province: Albacete
- Comarca: Sierra de Alcaraz

Government
  - Mayor: Angel Alfaro Sancho (PP)

Area
  - Total: 99.59 km^{2} (38.45 sq mi)

Population (2023)
  - Total: 648
  - Density: 6.51/km^{2} (16.9/sq mi)
- Time zone: UTC+1 (CET)
  - Summer (DST): UTC+2 (CEST)
- Postal code: 02124
- Website: alcadozo.es

Alcadozo is a municipality in Albacete, Castile-La Mancha, Spain. It has a population of 648.
