= Binasco =

- Comune
- Comune di Binasco
- View of Binasco

- Coat of arms

- Location within Italy Location within Lombardy
- Coordinates: 45°20′N 9°6′E
- Country: Italy
- Region: Lombardy
- Metropolitan city: Milan (MI)
- Frazioni: Cicognola, S. Giuseppe

Government
  - Mayor: Giovanni Mario Castoldi

Area
  - Total: 3.9 km^{2} (1.5 sq mi)

Population (Dec. 2004)
  - Total: 7,236
  - Density: 1,900/km^{2} (4,800/sq mi)
- Demonym: Binaschini
- Time zone: UTC+1 (CET)
  - Summer (DST): UTC+2 (CEST)
- Postal code: 20082
- Dialing code: 02
- Patron saint: Blessed Veronica of Milan
- Website: Official website

Binasco (Lombard: Binasch [biˈnask]) is a comune (municipality) in the Province of Milan in the Italian region Lombardy, located about 15 kilometres (9 mi) southwest of Milan. As of 31 December 2004, it had a population of 7,236 and an area of 3.9 square kilometres (1.5 mi^{2}).

Binasco borders the following municipalities: Zibido San Giacomo, Noviglio, Lacchiarella, Vernate, Casarile.

The coffee machine manufacturer Gruppo Cimbali SpA is based in Binasco.

== History ==
On May 24, 1796, 100 citizens of Binasco were executed and the village was burned at the orders of French general Napoleon Bonaparte in response to the inhabitants revolting against French occupation of Northern Italy.

== Demographic evolution ==
Historical population

Year	Pop.	±%
1861	1,378	—
1871	1,393	+1.1%
1881	1,551	+11.3%
1901	2,013	+29.8%
1911	2,380	+18.2%

Year	Pop.	±%
1921	2,337	−1.8%
1931	2,716	+16.2%
1936	2,740	+0.9%
1951	3,293	+20.2%
1961	4,277	+29.9%

Year	Pop.	±%
1971	5,666	+32.5%
1981	5,711	+0.8%
1991	6,437	+12.7%
2001	6,921	+7.5%
2010	7,275	+5.1%

Source: Data from ISTAT
