= Besate =

Besate Besàa (Lombard)
- Comune
- Comune di Besate
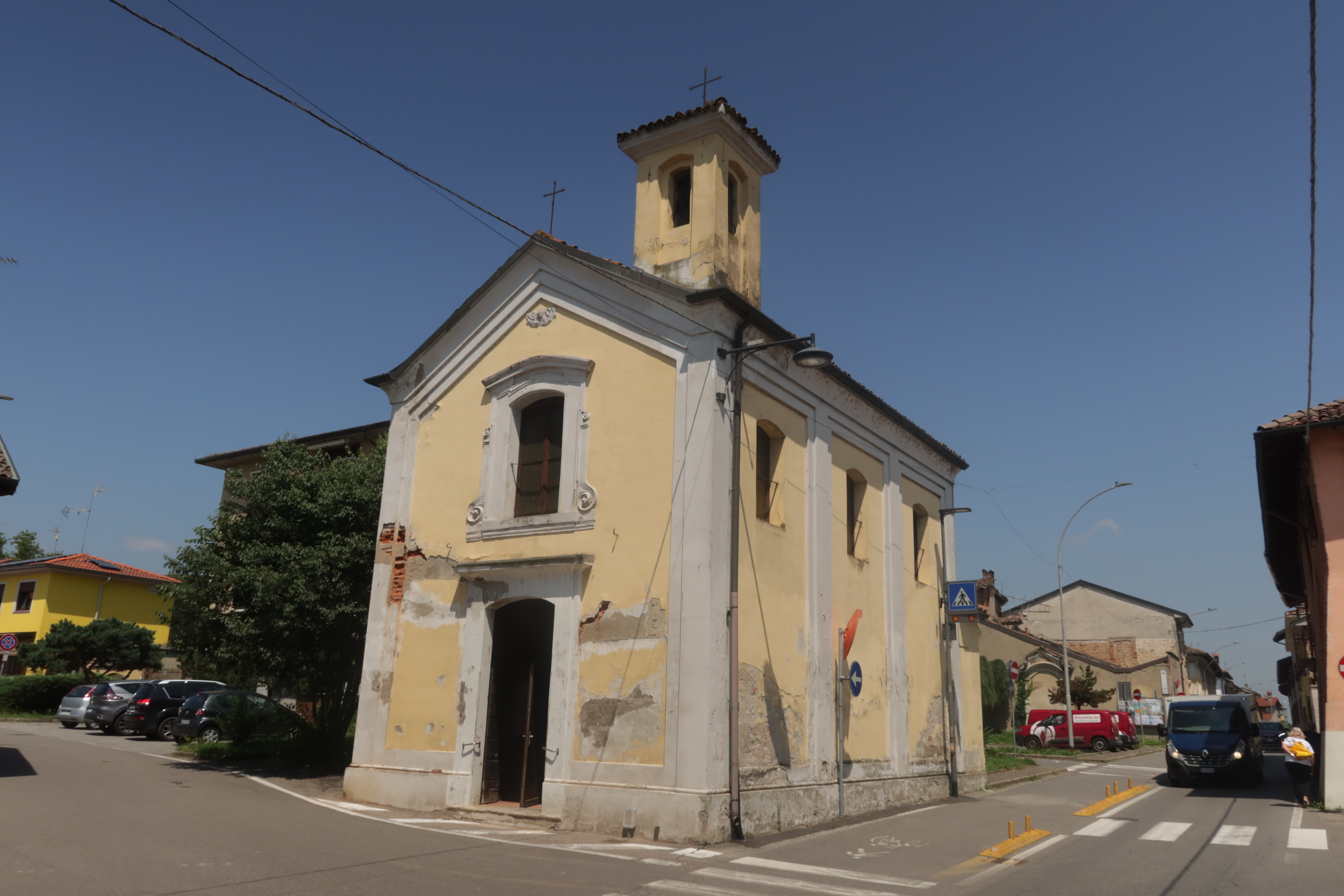
- Besate Church of Santa Eurosia and Sant'Ambrogio

- Coat of arms

- Location within Italy Location within Lombardy
- Coordinates: 45°19′N 8°58′E
- Country: Italy
- Region: Lombardy
- Metropolitan city: Milan (MI)

Government
  - Mayor: Maria Rosa Codegoni

Area
  - Total: 12.74 km^{2} (4.92 sq mi)
- Elevation: 104 m (341 ft)

Population (30 November 2017)
  - Total: 2,049
  - Density: 160.8/km^{2} (416.6/sq mi)
- Demonym: Besatesi
- Time zone: UTC+1 (CET)
  - Summer (DST): UTC+2 (CEST)
- Postal code: 20080
- Dialing code: 02
- Website: Official website

Besate (Milanese: Besàa) is a comune (municipality) in the Metropolitan City of Milan in the Italian region Lombardy, located about 25 kilometres (16 mi) southwest of Milan.

Besate borders the following municipalities: Morimondo, Vigevano, Casorate Primo, and Motta Visconti.

== Economy ==
According to statistics from the Centro Studi Sintesi of Mestre, which annually draws up a ranking based on the "wealth" of Italian municipalities based on income, Besate was the richest town in Italy in 2006, with an average per capita income of around 30,000 euros. Besate had already been at the top of the special ranking in 2004, while the following year it was overtaken by Basiglio, another municipality in the metropolitan city of Milan.

=== Industry ===
In Besate, Gorgonzola DOP has been produced for several generations: the Gelmini Cheese Factory exports the cheese all over the world, which was also locally called "stracchin veech".
