= Zibido San Giacomo =

- Comune
- Comune di Zibido San Giacomo
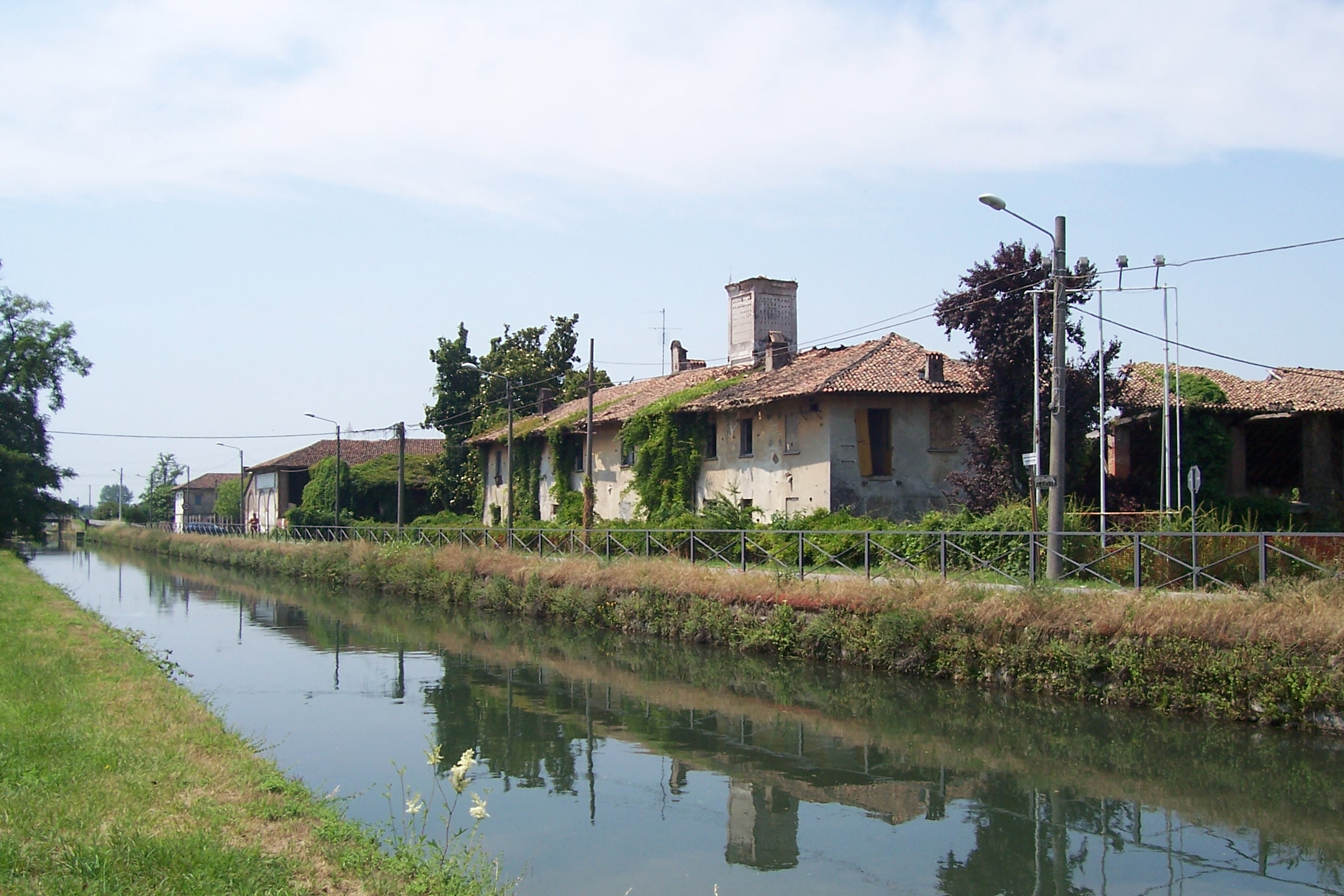

- Location within Italy Location within Lombardy
- Coordinates: 45°22′N 9°7′E
- Country: Italy
- Region: Lombardy
- Metropolitan city: Milan (MI)
- Frazioni: Badile, Moirago, San Giacomo, San Novo, San Pietro Cusico, Zibido

Government
  - Mayor: Sonia Belloli

Area
  - Total: 24.58 km^{2} (9.49 sq mi)
- Elevation: 111 m (364 ft)

Population (31 December 2017)
  - Total: 6,872
  - Density: 279.6/km^{2} (724.1/sq mi)
- Demonym: Zibidesi
- Time zone: UTC+1 (CET)
  - Summer (DST): UTC+2 (CEST)
- Postal code: 20080
- Dialing code: 02
- Patron saint: St. James
- Saint day: 25 July
- Website: Official website

Zibido San Giacomo (Lombard: Zibid [ˈziːbit]) is a town in the Metropolitan City of Milan, Lombardy, northern Italy.
