= Raffaele Casnedi =

Italian painter (1822–1892)

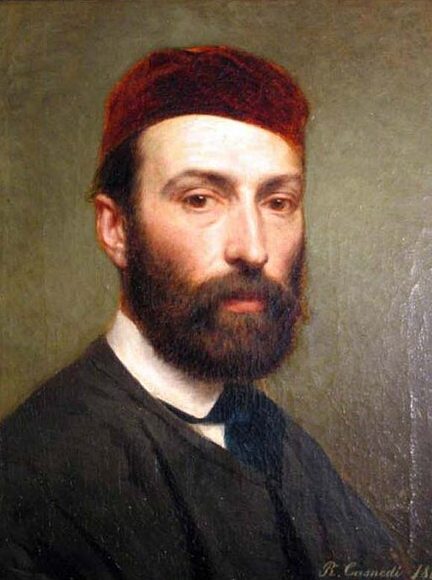
Self-portrait (1860s)

Filippo Tobia Raffaele Casnedi (26 September 1822 – 29 December 1892) was an Italian painter and decorative designer.

== Biography ==
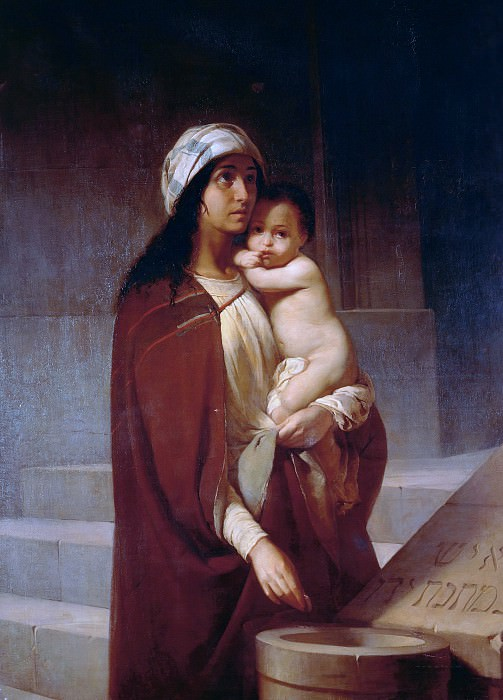
The Poor Widow, Making an Offering

He was born in Dumenza to Pietro Casnedi and his wife Angela, née Spaini; members of the Lombard nobility. He had three sisters and two brothers; one of whom participated in the Capture of Rome. While he was still a child, his family moved to Milan, to manage a hotel. When he turned eighteen, rather than becoming a partner in the hotel, he chose to pursue his interest in art and enrolled at the Accademia di Brera; much to his family's disappointment.

There, he studied drawing with Giuseppe Sogni, and painting with Luigi Sabatelli. As part of his instruction, he helped his teachers create frescoes at churches in Novara and Valmadrera. In 1846, he painted two muses in the foyer of the Teatro di Mortara. He completed his studies in 1850.

In 1851, he won a competition that provided accommodations and work opportunities in Rome. He obtained clients there and in the surrounding rural areas. In 1852, he won the Mylius Prize for his fresco, "The School of Leonardo", in the portico at the Accademia di Brera. In 1855, after creating numerous frescoes in local churches, and receiving several private commissions, his financial support expired.

He returned to Milan, where he continued to produce works in traditional styles and genres. In 1856, he joined the staff at the Accademia as an adjunct professor of figure drawing. That same year, he married Clotilde Fanfani, a noblewoman, and opened a studio in the Palazzo Crivelli.

From 1856 to 1860, he worked in Rho, for the Oblates of Saints Ambrose and Charles, creating "The Curse of the Serpent" at their Sanctuary of the Blessed Virgin of the Sorrows. In 1860, he became a full Professor. His notable students would include Pietro Bouvier, Francesco Didioni, Angelo Morbelli and Giovanni Sottocornola Once again, he focused on religious frescoes; in Abbiategrasso, Inverigo, Inveruno, Marcallo, Olginate, and Luino. An exception was from 1861 to 1863, when he and Giuseppe Bertini, an old friend from his school days, painted the curtain at the Teatro alla Scala with the "Tales of the Atlanteans".

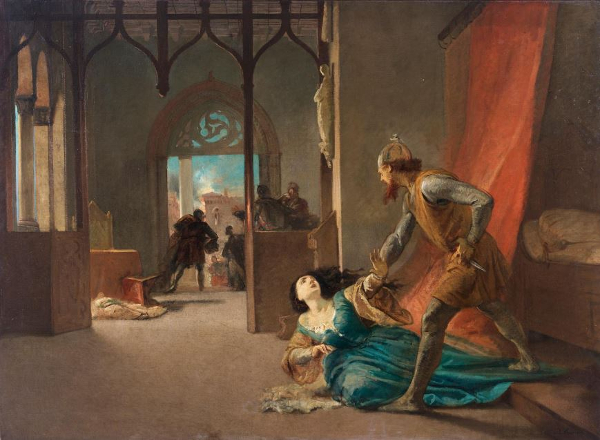
The Corsair Barbarossa Attempts to Kidnap Giulia Gonzaga During the Siege of Sperlonga

Following the Unification of Italy, he began to produce some historical paintings. From 1864 to 1865, he decorated the hall at the original Milan Central Rail Station with allegories of the Italian provinces. The following two years, he created an allegory of America at the Galleria Vittorio Emanuele II. Both of these frescoes deteriorated and were replaced with mosaic copies in 1911.

During the 1870s, he once gain focused on religious paintings in the local churches. In 1879, he was named a Knight in the Order of the Crown of Italy. Most of his works after 1881 were realistic depictions of contemporary life. He died in 1892 in Milan and was interred at the Cimitero Monumentale di Milano.

== Bibliography ==
- Bossaglia, Rossana (1971). L'arte dal manierismo al primo Novecento. Vol. 5. Milan: Edizioni Il Polifilo. p. 248.
- Colombo, Silvano (1978). "CASNEDI, Raffaele". Dizionario Biografico degli Italiani (in Italian). Vol. 21: Caruso–Castelnuovo. Rome: Institute of the Italian Encyclopaedia. ISBN 978-88-12-00032-6.
- Martoli, Simona (2007). Guida d'arte della Svizzera italiana. Bellinzona: Edizioni Casagrande. pp. 178–179. ISBN 978-88-7713-482-0.
