= Bernate Ticino =

Bernate Ticino Barnaa (Lombard)
- Comune
- Comune di Bernate Ticino
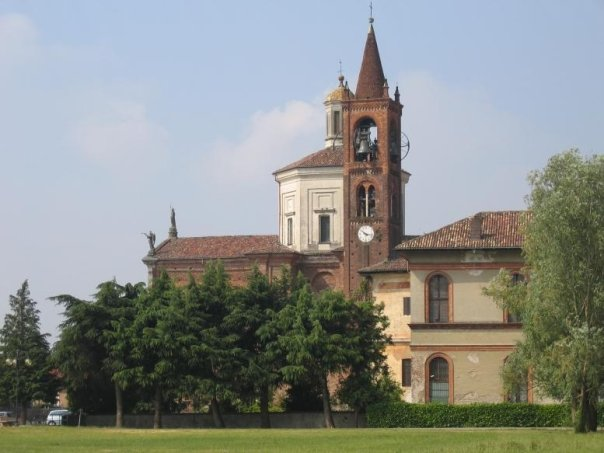
- View of Bernate Ticino

- Coat of arms

- Location within Italy Location within Lombardy
- Coordinates: 45°29′N 8°49′E
- Country: Italy
- Region: Lombardy
- Metropolitan city: Milan (MI)

Government
  - Mayor: Mariapia Colombo

Area
  - Total: 12.1 km^{2} (4.7 sq mi)
- Elevation: 130 m (430 ft)

Population (1 January 2024)
  - Total: 2,914
  - Density: 241/km^{2} (624/sq mi)
- Demonym: Bernatesi
- Time zone: UTC+1 (CET)
  - Summer (DST): UTC+2 (CEST)
- Postal code: 20010
- Dialing code: 02
- ISTAT code: 015019
- Website: Official website

Bernate Ticino (Milanese: Bernaa [berˈnaː], locally Barnaa [barˈnaː]) is a comune (municipality) in the Metropolitan City of Milan, in the northern Italian region of Lombardy, located approximately 25 kilometres (16 mi) west of Milan.

The town is situated on the Ticino River and is traversed by the Naviglio Grande. In 2005, a small Roman necropolis, comprising 12 tombs, was discovered within the territory of Bernate Ticino.

== Geography ==
=== Territory ===
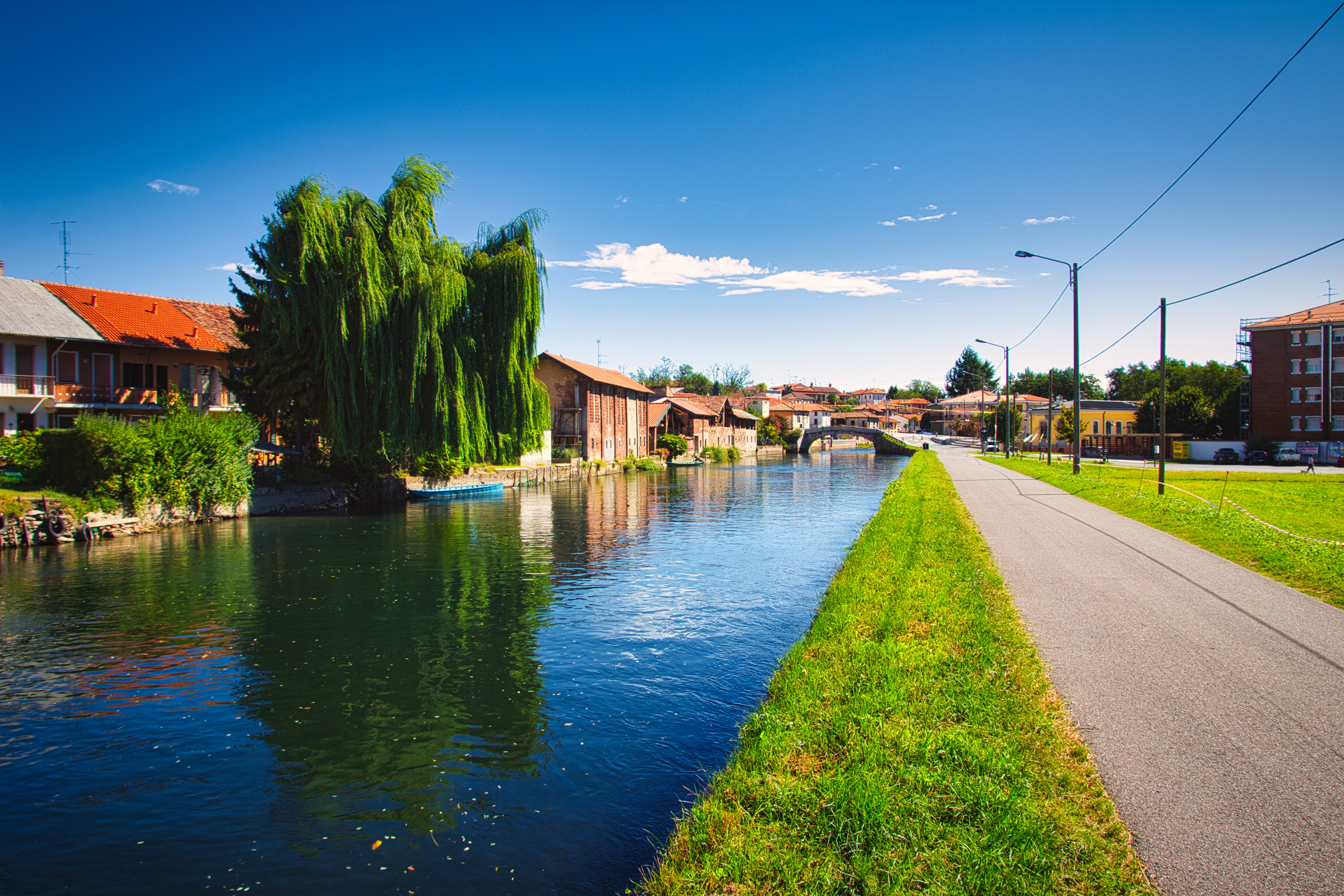
Naviglio Grande in Bernate Ticino

Bernate Ticino is located east of the Ticino River and approximately 30 kilometers west of Milan, the capital of the Metropolitan City of Milan. It shares borders with Cuggiono to the north, via the hamlet of Casate; Mesero to the east; Marcallo con Casone to the south; and Boffalora sopra Ticino to the west, adjoining the Piedmont municipality of Romentino.

The town is divided into two distinct areas: a central-western area, which includes the town center and features less densely populated settlements along with forested vegetation extending to the Parco del Ticino; and an eastern area, characterized by a higher degree of urbanization. These two areas are separated by the Naviglio Grande and connected by a historic seventeenth-century bridge. The most recent residential developments are located towards the western and northwestern extremities of the town, while the industrial zone is concentrated in a large area on the western side, bordering the municipality of Boffalora sopra Ticino.

=== Geology and hydrography ===
Morphologically, the territory of Bernate Ticino is typical of the Po Valley (Pianura Padana), consisting of elevated areas, descending zones along the banks of watercourses, and marshy regions. The average altitude is approximately 130 meters above sea level. A notable feature of the local hydrography is the presence of both the Naviglio Grande and the Ticino River along the western edge of the municipality. Bernate Ticino is also part of the Polo dei Navigli, a network established by the Metropolitan City of Milan.

== History ==
=== Roman Age ===
Archaeological excavations conducted in 2005 by the Soprintendenza Archeologica della Lombardia uncovered a necropolis consisting of twelve inhumation tombs dating from the late Roman period, as well as a single burial from the first century AD. Analysis of the findings suggests that the small community had an economy based on agriculture and trade. The good quality of the artifacts indicates that the inhabitants likely enjoyed a certain degree of wealth.

=== Middle Ages ===
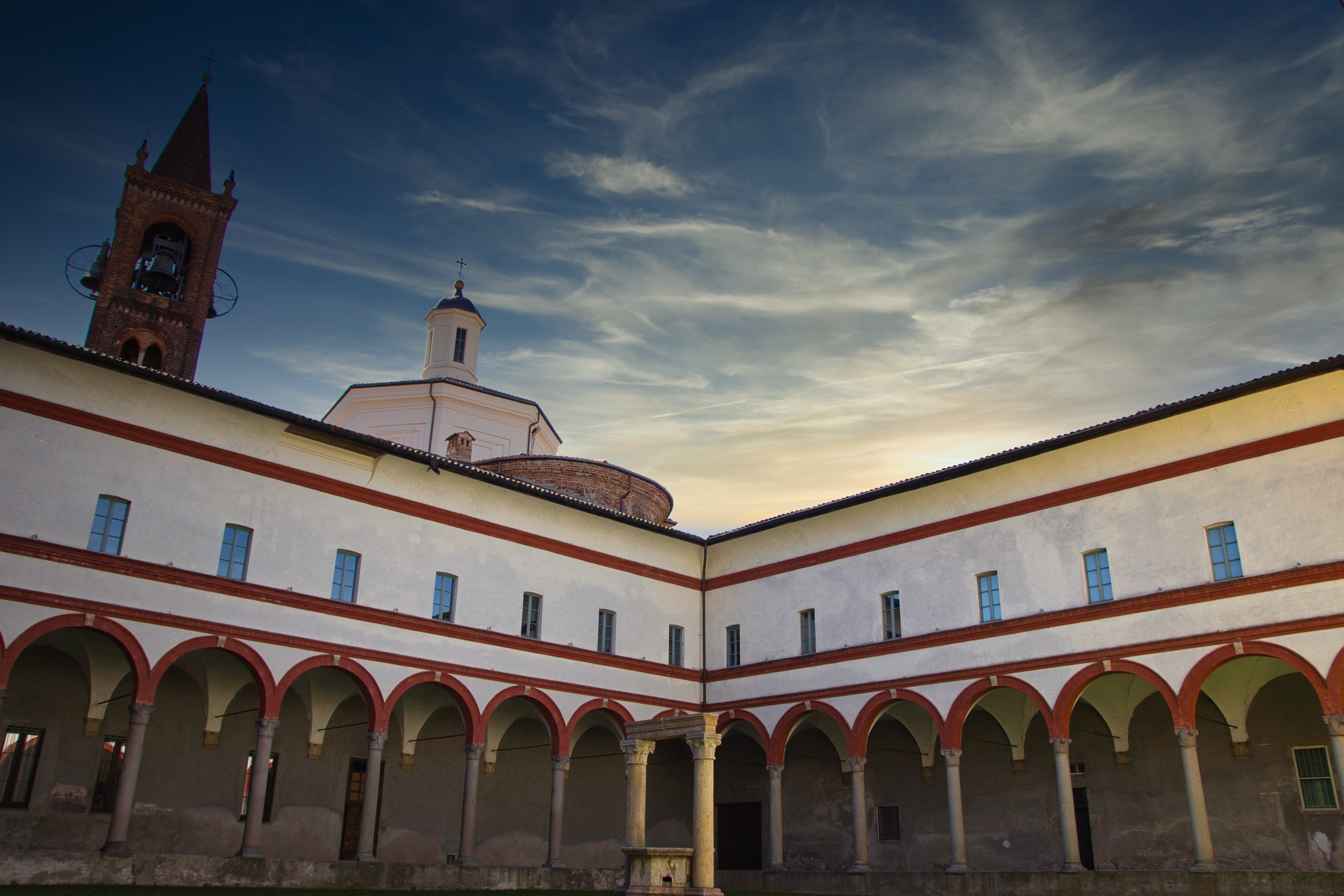
Cloister, Bell tower and Church (building) of the Canonica of Saint George in Bernate

The town of Bernate was historically part of the territory of the Province of Pavia; however, at the time of the land register under Maria Theresa, it belonged to the Pieve of Corbetta within the Duchy of Milan. By the mid-eighteenth century, Bernate also included the localities of Casate and Rubone. During the Middle Ages, Bernate was referred to as Brinate, as recorded in a 1045 map cited by Giorgio Giulini (Memorie ecc. 1st ed. Vol. III, p. 427), where Henry III, Holy Roman Emperor, confirmed to the monks of San Dionigi in Milan the abbey with the church of Santa Maria in Solariolo and other lands.

A significant medieval feature was a castle mentioned in a document from 1098, which recorded a sale for 40 pounds (ca. 18 kg) made by Algerio, son of Vallone of Brinate, to Ariberto, a priest. This transaction included all of Algerio's properties, goods, and rights in Inveruno, Trecate, and Bernate, except for the castle itself. Giulini also preserved the will of Ariberto from January 1099, which stated that Algerio's mother, Otta, was usufructuary of these goods until her death. The will divided the property (excluding the port on the Ticino River) into two parts: one portion belonged to the church of Saint George of Bernate, which was under the monastery of San Vincenzo in Milan, while the other portions of the church were not subject to any patronage.

The Crivelli family is documented in this period. In 1150, Giovanni of the Basilica of Sant'Ambrogio granted Domenico, Pietro, Pastore, and Gualla Crivelli rights over banks, gravel, and woods in the territories of Brinasca (Bernate) and Cusionno (Cuggiono). The Crivelli family thus extended its authority to two feuds. In 1186, Uberto Crivelli—later Pope Urban III—founded the regular rectory at the church of Saint George. On 25 November 1186, Pope Urban III, issued a sealed document concerning the parish of Santa Maria di Crescenzago. He acknowledged that the church of Saint George in Brinate, founded on paternal land, was deprived of goods and possessions. He assigned to it goods purchased by the nuns of Caronno (excluding the port and gravel of the Ticino River), as well as properties acquired from the monks of San Vincenzo and local soldiers. With this endowment, he established a canonical congregation at the church of Bernate according to the rule of Saint Augustine.

=== Modern period to present ===
In 1786, the district of Bernate was incorporated into the province of Pavia. During the Napoleonic era, the district was merged with that of Boffalora but was later re-established as independent under Austrian rule. Until 1862, the town was known simply as Bernate; it officially adopted the name Bernate Ticino following Royal Decree No. 1059 on 14 December 1862.

In more recent times, Bernate Ticino appeared in the 1978 film L'albero degli zoccoli, directed by Ermanno Olmi. A shot along the Naviglio Grande clearly shows the dome of the parish church and the medieval bell tower.

== Climate ==
Bernate Ticino experiences a mild, generally warm and temperate climate. The area receives a significant amount of rainfall throughout the year, including during the driest month. According to the Köppen-Geiger climate classification system, the climate is classified as Cfa (humid subtropical).

The average annual temperature is approximately 13.2 °C (55.8 °F). Total yearly precipitation measures around 1,301 mm (51.2 inches). January is the driest month, with an average rainfall of 66 mm (2.6 inches), while November receives the highest precipitation, averaging 168 mm (6.6 inches). July is the warmest month, with an average temperature of 24.0 °C (75.3 °F), and January is the coldest, with an average temperature of 2.6 °C (36.6 °F).

Climate data for Bernate Ticino
Month	Jan	Feb	Mar	Apr	May	Jun	Jul	Aug	Sep	Oct	Nov	Dec	Year
Mean daily maximum °F (°C)	45 (7)	48.4 (9.1)	57.0 (13.9)	63.9 (17.7)	70.0 (21.1)	80.2 (26.8)	84.0 (28.9)	82.2 (27.9)	73.9 (23.3)	63.9 (17.7)	53.1 (11.7)	45.3 (7.4)	63.9 (17.7)
Mean daily minimum °F (°C)	30.6 (−0.8)	31.6 (−0.2)	38.1 (3.4)	45.7 (7.6)	53.8 (12.1)	61.9 (16.6)	66.0 (18.9)	65.5 (18.6)	58.1 (14.5)	50.5 (10.3)	41.2 (5.1)	32 (0)	47.9 (8.8)
Average precipitation inches (mm)	2.6 (66)	2.7 (69)	3.1 (79)	4.8 (122)	5.1 (130)	4.5 (114)	3.3 (85)	4.4 (112)	5.3 (134)	5.8 (148)	6.6 (168)	2.9 (74)	51.1 (1,301)
Average relative humidity (%)	80	74	68	68	67	63	60	65	70	78	82	82	71
Source: Climate-data.org

== Etymology ==
The origin of the name Bernate Ticino is uncertain. Some studies suggest that it derives from the Latin prunetum, meaning a place for the cultivation of plums, which later evolved in Late Latin to brunetum. Other sources trace the name to the Latin personal name Berinus. Another hypothesis links the name to Castrum Brinati (fourth century AD), the Roman designation for a fortified site established to guard a port on the Ticino River.

The village appears as Brinate in a charter issued by Emperor Henry III in 1045. At that time, it was considered a "strong place" with a castle, strategically located as a passage toward the Ticino River and Turbigo. The site's military importance lay in controlling the movement of civilians and soldiers through defensive structures.

== Festivals and folklore events ==
The principal religious celebration in Bernate Ticino is the feast of the Most Holy Name of the Blessed Virgin Mary, held annually on the second weekend of September. A notable feature of this event is the procession of boats along the Naviglio Grande on Saturday evening, followed by the Regata Storica of Bernate Ticino (historical regatta) on Sunday afternoon. Additionally, the town honours Saint George, its patron saint, with festivities on 23 April.
