= Mesar =

Mesar may refer to:

- Filip Mešár (born 2004), Slovak ice hockey player
- Marko "Mesar" Miljković, Serbian mafia member
- Alternate name for Mesero – Comune in the Metropolitan City of Milan, Italy
- MESAR, Multifunction Electronically Scanned Adaptive Radar
