= Oratory del Gonfalone, Trecate =

Oratory in Trecate, Italy

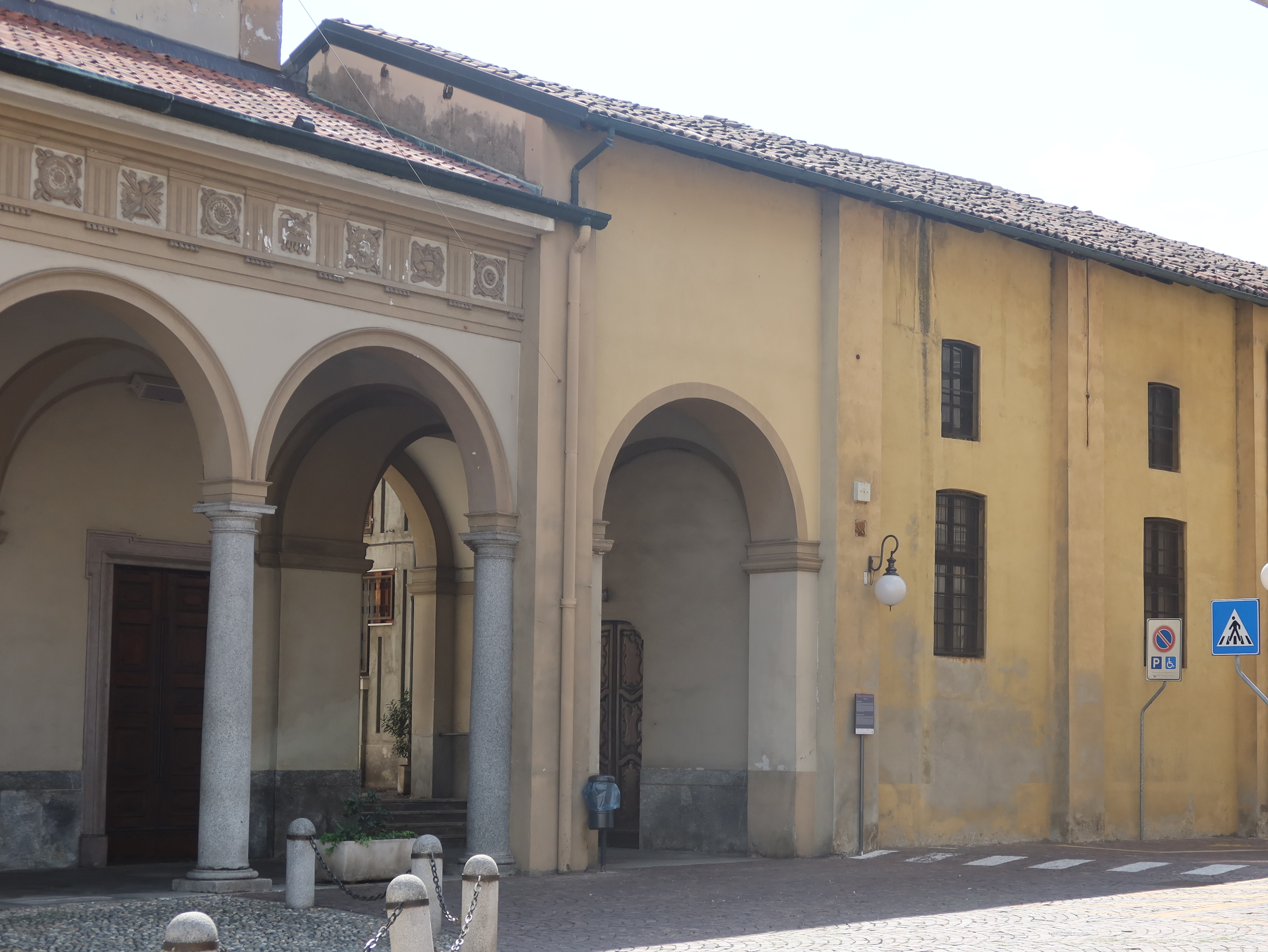

The Oratorio del Gonfalone is the Roman Catholic oratory located near the church of Santa Maria Assunta in the town of Trecate, province of Novara, Piedmont, Italy.

== History ==
The oratory was once the meeting house of the Confraternity of the Gonfalone (a processional standard). The structure was erected in the late 16th century. In 1657, the Confraternity consisted of some 140 members, men and women, who used to wear a white robe and a pointed cap. The church has a simple single rectangular nave, but houses a main altarpiece within a gilt frame depicting a Coronation of the Virgin between the St Augustine and St Bonaventura by the il Cerano.
