= Boffalora sopra Ticino =

- Comune
- Comune di Boffalora sopra Ticino
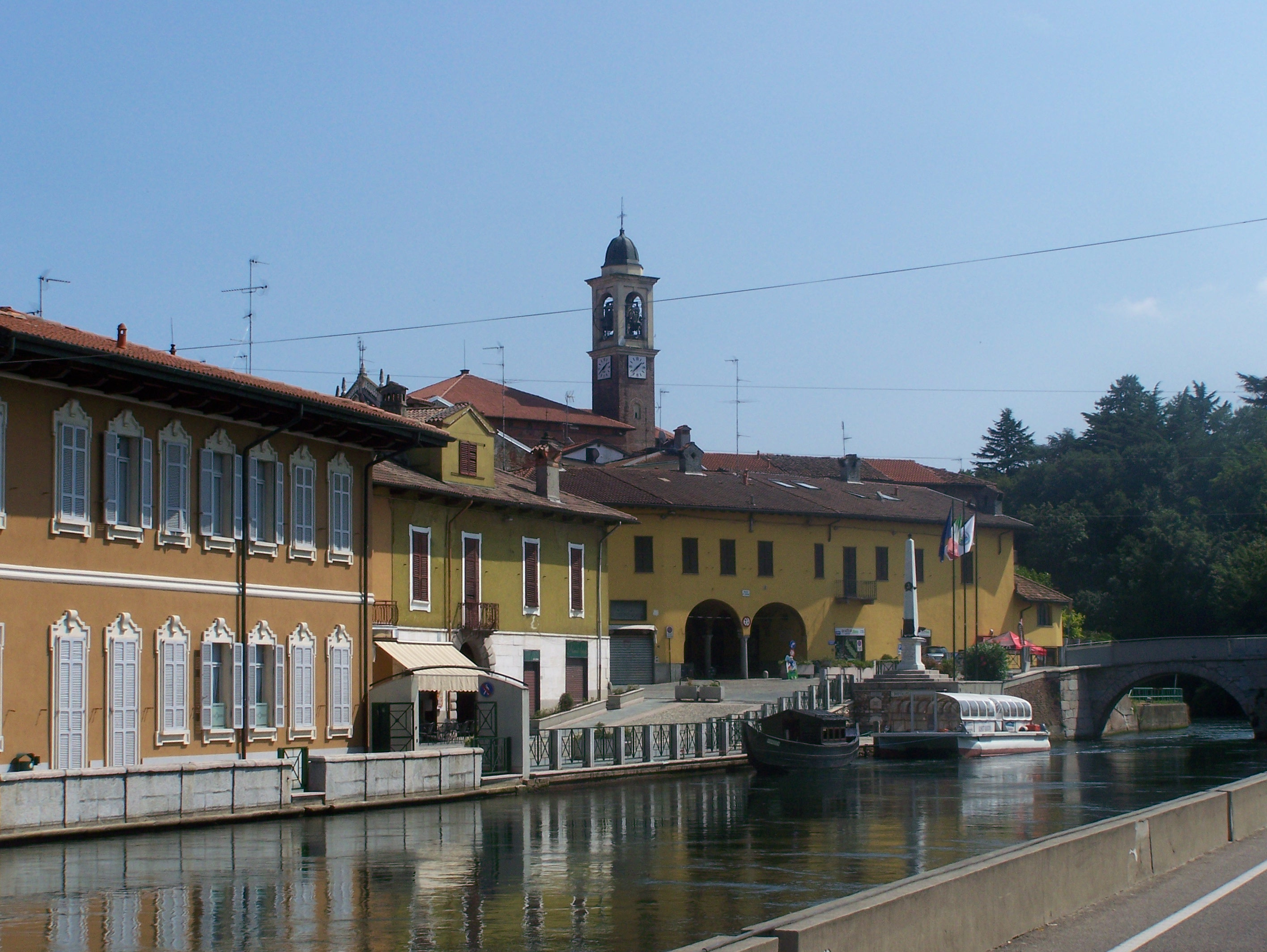
- The town, near the Naviglio Grande

- Coat of arms

- Location within Italy Location within Lombardy
- Coordinates: 45°28′N 8°50′E
- Country: Italy
- Region: Lombardy
- Metropolitan city: Milan (MI)
- Frazioni: Pontenuovo di Boffalora, Località Magnana

Government
  - Mayor: Sabina Doniselli

Area
  - Total: 7.65 km^{2} (2.95 sq mi)
- Elevation: 120 m (390 ft)

Population (Dec. 2004)
  - Total: 4,313
  - Density: 564/km^{2} (1,460/sq mi)
- Demonym: Boffaloresi
- Time zone: UTC+1 (CET)
  - Summer (DST): UTC+2 (CEST)
- Postal code: 20010
- Dialing code: 02
- Website: Official website

Boffalora sopra Ticino (Milanese: Boffalòra [bufaˈlɔra]) is a comune (municipality) in the Metropolitan City of Milan in the Italian region Lombardy, located about 25 kilometres (16 mi) west of Milan.

Boffalora sopra Ticino borders the following municipalities: Marcallo con Casone, Bernate Ticino, Magenta, Trecate, Cerano.

== History ==
Boffalora sopra Ticino was the site of a small battle in the 1859 Second Italian War of Independence. It was one of the first locations in what had been up to then Austrian territory to be captured by a French army which crossed the Ticino after the Battle of Montebello.

== Notable people ==
- Alfredo Colombo, footballer
- Luigi Magnotti, cyclist
