= Lorenzo Peracino =

Italian painter (1710–1789)

Lorenzo Peracino (16 May 1710 - 25 December 1789) was an Italian painter and sculptor active near Novara in northern Italy. He completed his apprenticeship at the Sacro Monte di Orta and later at the Sacro Monte di Varallo.

== Biography ==
He was born at Bosco, in what is now Cellio con Breia, to peasant parents. Lorenzo was likely educated as a boy in the town of Cellio. It is unclear where he learned painting. His first known work is a Martyrdom of St Mamante(1736) located in the parish church of Cavaglio d'Agogna. In 1747 he designs frescoes for the five chapels of the Misteri Dolorosi of the sanctuary-church of San Pietro, called the chiesa da Lopià. From 1748 to 1752: Peracino worked in Galliate. In 1754, he decorated the chapel of the Crucifix in the parish church of Cellio. In 1756, he frescoed two chapels in the parish church of Valduggia. Between 1759 and 1762, he frescoed the cupola of the sanctuary at Galliate. In 1761, he decorated the ceiling of the Presbytery and choir of the parish church of Breia, and the Chapel of the Crucifix in the Collegiata di Borgosesia, and the ceiling, spandrels, and lunettes of the Tempietto di San Clemente in the parish church of Santa Maria Assunta of Trecate. In 1778 he designs the fresco decoration for the sacristy of the Sanctuary del Varallino di Galliate.
