= Cerano =

- Comune
- Comune di Cerano
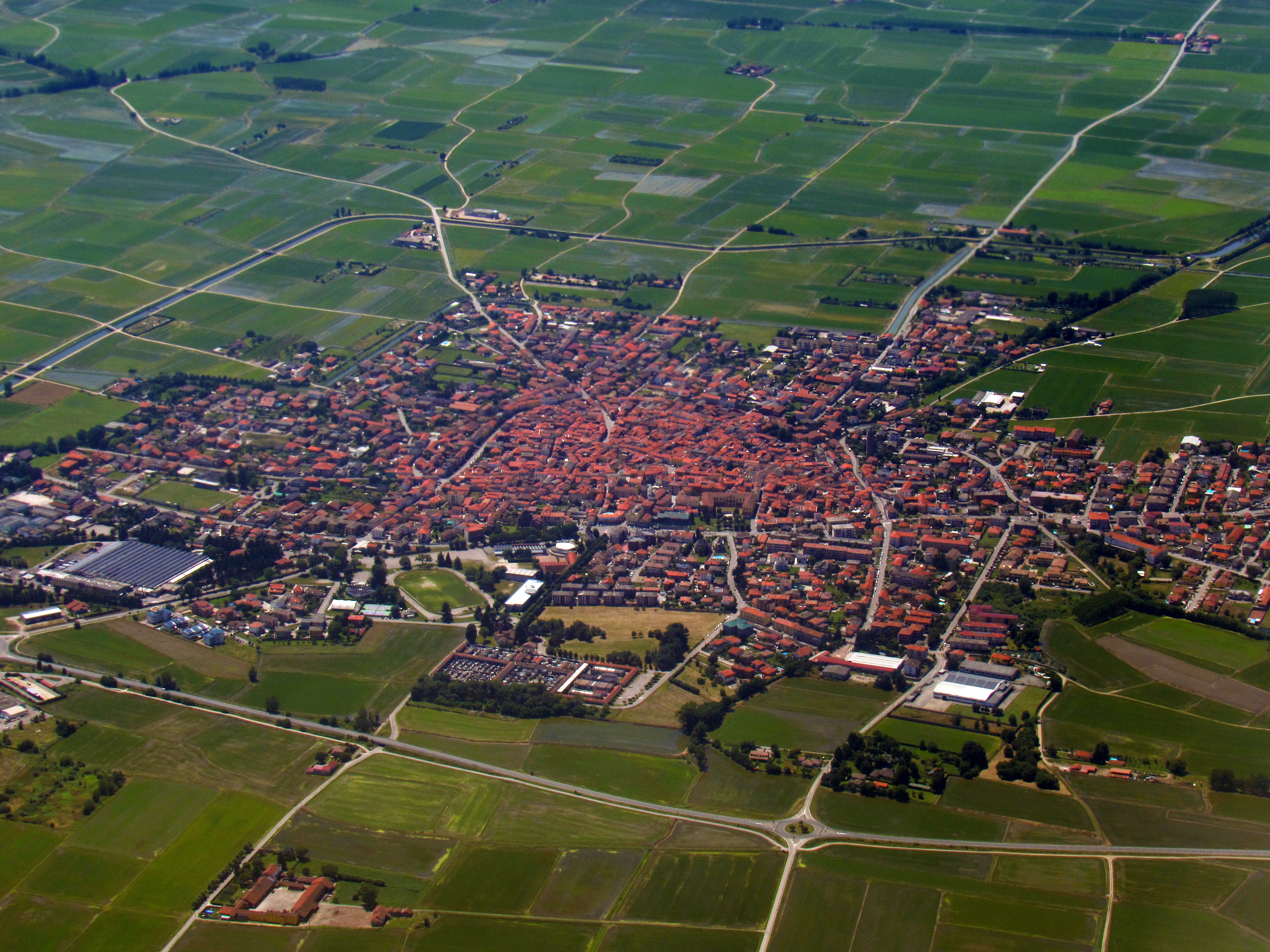
- Aerial view of Cerano

- Coat of arms

- Location within Italy Location within Piedmont
- Coordinates: 45°24′N 8°47′E
- Country: Italy
- Region: Piedmont
- Province: Novara (NO)

Government
  - Mayor: Andrea Volpi

Area
  - Total: 32.1 km^{2} (12.4 sq mi)
- Elevation: 134 m (440 ft)

Population (Dec. 2004)
  - Total: 6,792
  - Density: 212/km^{2} (548/sq mi)
- Demonym: Ceranesi
- Time zone: UTC+1 (CET)
  - Summer (DST): UTC+2 (CEST)
- Postal code: 28065
- Dialing code: 0321
- Website: Official website

Cerano (Sciarön in lombard) is a comune (municipality) in the Province of Novara in the Italian region Piedmont, located about 90 kilometres (56 mi) northeast of Turin and about 14 kilometres (9 mi) southeast of Novara.

Cerano borders the following municipalities: Abbiategrasso, Boffalora sopra Ticino, Cassolnovo, Magenta, Robecco sul Naviglio, Sozzago, and Trecate.

The Renaissance painter Giovanni Battista Crespi is known as il Cerano because he resided here.
