= Villafortuna oil field =

Oil field in Piedmont, Italy

Villafortuna
- Country: Italy
- Region: Piedmont
- Offshore/onshore: onshore
- Operator: Eni

Field history
- Discovery: 1984
- Start of production: 1984

Production
- Current production of oil: 60,000 barrels per day (~3.0×10^{6} t/a)
- Estimated oil in place: 40 million tonnes (~ 50×10^{6} m^{3} or 300 million bbl)
- Estimated gas in place: 2×10^{9} m^{3} 70×10^{9} cu ft

The Villafortuna oil field is an oil field located in Trecate, Piedmont and extending in the subsurface to westernmost Lombardy (along Ticino River, in the municipal territory of Turbigo, Cuggiono e Bernate). It was discovered in 1984 and developed by Eni. It began production in 1984 and produces oil. The total proven reserves of the Villafortuna oil field are around 300 million barrels (40 million tonnes), and production is centered on 60,000 barrels per day (9,500 m^{3}/d).

A composite geological section between southern Ticino and the northern part of the Po Valley (area of Milan), showing the main structural features. The Mesozoic series of the Middle-Late Triassic at Monte San Giorgio constitutes, at the outcrop, the equivalent of both the source rock (mainly identified in the Besano Formation) and the reservoir rock of the Trecate-Villafortuna oil field, located between Piedmont and western Lombardy. The reservoir rocks consist of carbonate platform dolomite units (among which, the Dolomia Principale), with lateral facies transition to the basinal-lagoonal source units (rich in TOC). Subsurface data published by Eni and oucrop data from Swiss Geologic Map (1/25000 - Foglio 1373, Mendrisio-Como). Vertical scale in meters (indicative). Text in Italian.
