= Santo Stefano Ticino =

- Comune
- Comune di Santo Stefano Ticino
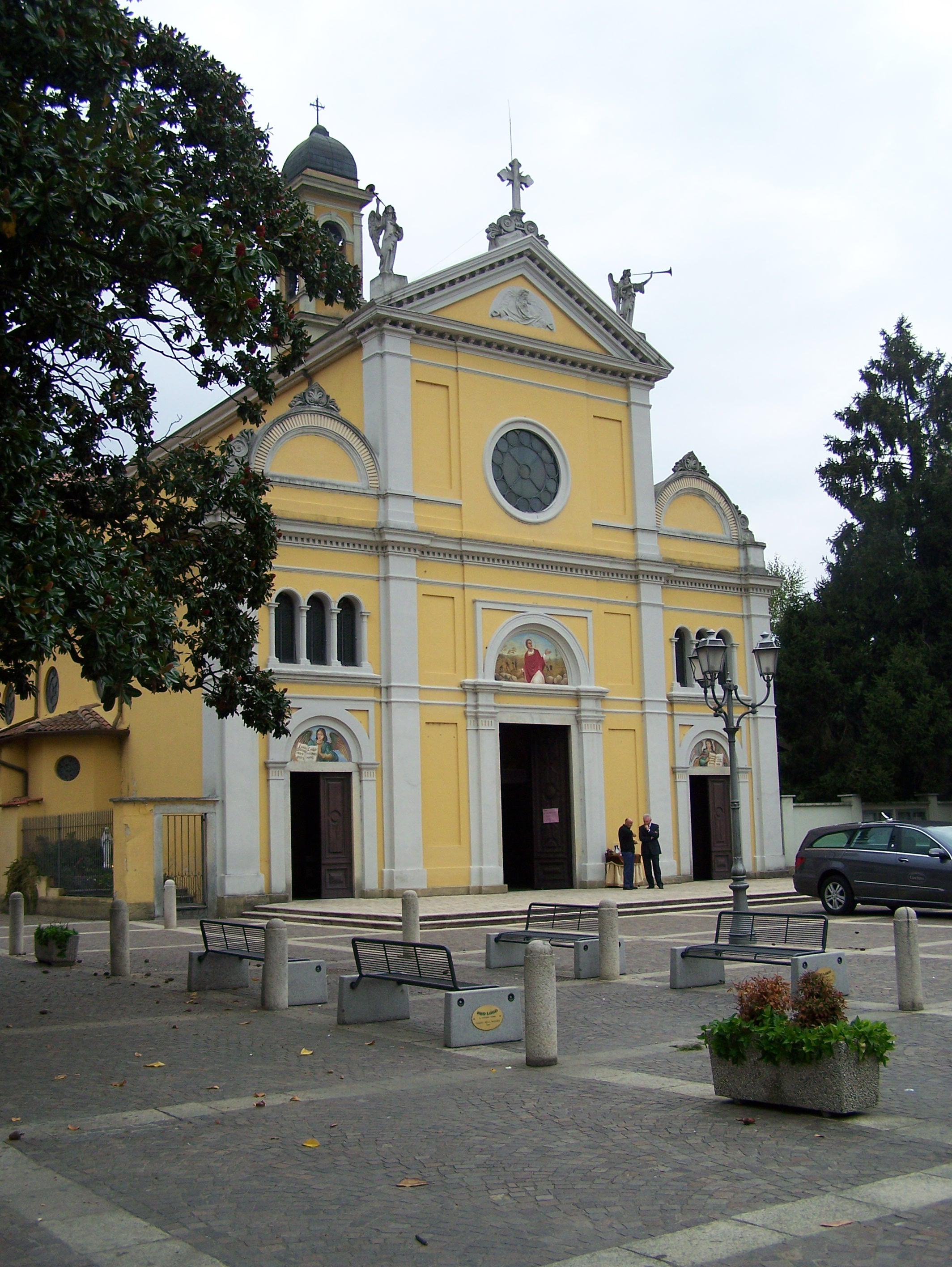

- Coat of arms

- Location within Italy Location within Lombardy
- Coordinates: 45°29′N 8°55′E
- Country: Italy
- Region: Lombardy
- Metropolitan city: Milan (MI)

Government
  - Mayor: Dario Tunesi

Area
  - Total: 5.0 km^{2} (1.9 sq mi)
- Elevation: 152 m (499 ft)

Population (31 August 2020)
  - Total: 4,976
  - Density: 1,000/km^{2} (2,600/sq mi)
- Demonym: Stefanesi
- Time zone: UTC+1 (CET)
  - Summer (DST): UTC+2 (CEST)
- Postal code: 20010
- Dialing code: 02
- Website: Official website

Santo Stefano Ticino (Milanese: Sastevan) is a comune (municipality) in the Metropolitan City of Milan in the Italian region Lombardy, located about 20 kilometres (12 mi) west of Milan. Santo Stefano Ticino borders the following municipalities: Arluno, Ossona, Marcallo con Casone, Corbetta, and Magenta.
