= Pogliano Milanese =

- Comune
- Comune di Pogliano Milanese
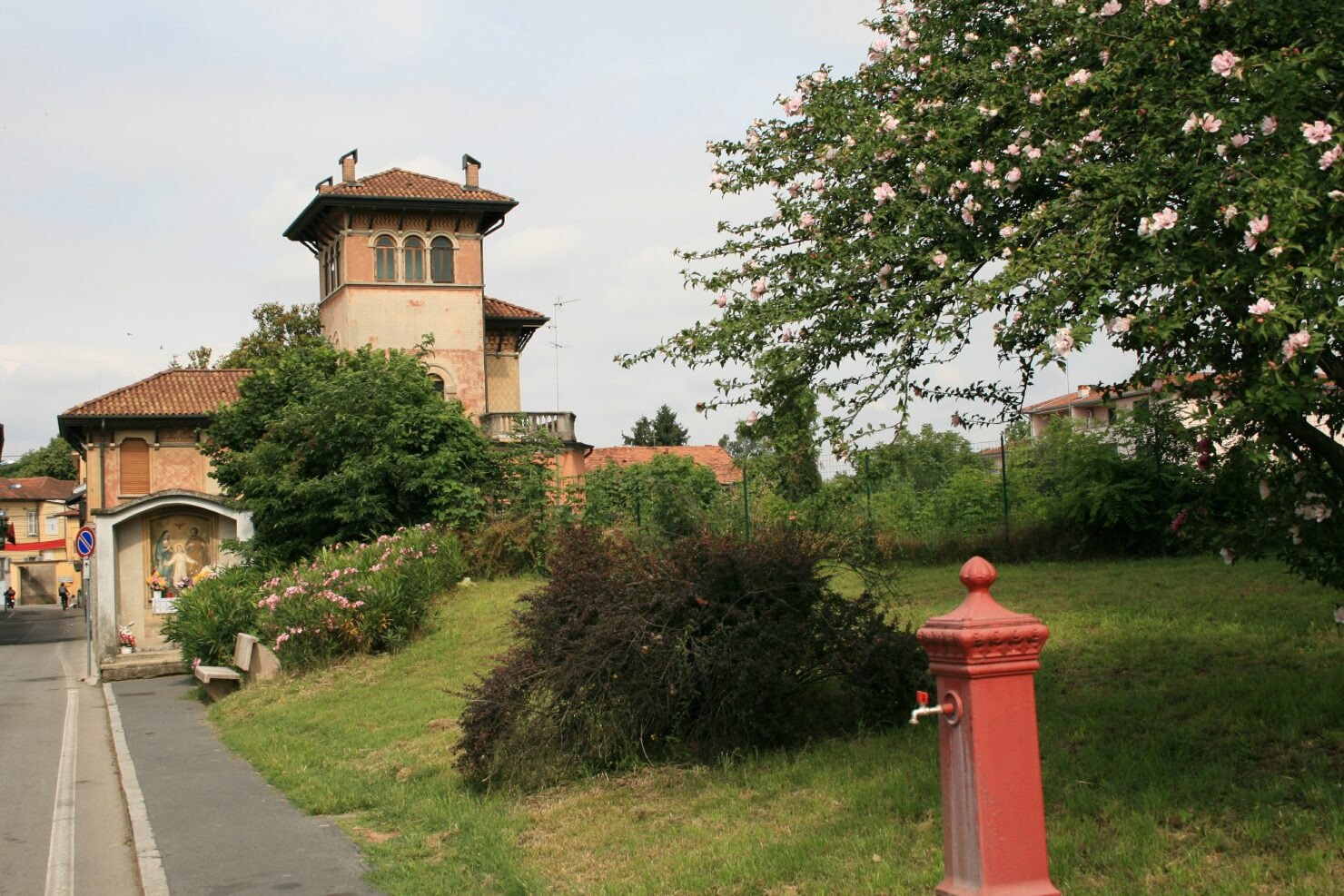

- Location within Italy Location within Lombardy
- Coordinates: 45°32′N 9°0′E
- Country: Italy
- Region: Lombardy
- Metropolitan city: Milan (MI)
- Frazioni: Bettolino

Government
  - Mayor: Carmine Lavanga

Area
  - Total: 4.7 km^{2} (1.8 sq mi)
- Elevation: 127 m (417 ft)

Population (24 December 2017)
  - Total: 8,379
  - Density: 1,800/km^{2} (4,600/sq mi)
- Demonym: Poglianesi
- Time zone: UTC+1 (CET)
  - Summer (DST): UTC+2 (CEST)
- Postal code: 20005
- Dialing code: 02
- Website: Official website

Pogliano Milanese (Lombard: Pojan [puˈjãː]) is a comune (municipality) in the Province of Milan in the Italian region Lombardy, located about 15 kilometres (9 mi) northwest of Milan.

Pogliano Milanese borders the following municipalities: Lainate, Nerviano, Rho, Vanzago, Pregnana Milanese, Arluno.
