= Angelo Morbelli =

Italian painter (1853–1919)

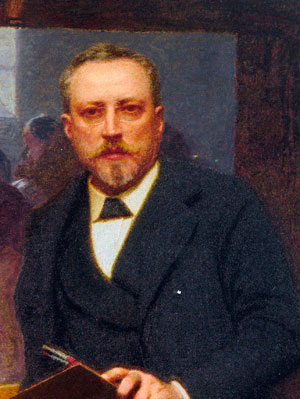
- Self-portrait (date unknown)
- Born: 18 July 1853; Alessandria, Kingdom of Lombardy–Venetia
- Died: 7 November 1919 (aged 66); Milan, Kingdom of Italy
- Known for: Painting
- Movement: Realism, Divisionism

Angelo Morbelli (18 July 1853, Alessandria – 7 November 1919, Milan) was an Italian painter of socially conscious genre scenes. During his later years, he painted in the Divisionist style.

== Biography ==
=== Early life and education ===
He was born to Giovanni Morbelli, a government official, and his wife Giovannina, née Feraris. At first he studied music, but contracted mastoiditis, which led to a progressive hearing loss. As a result, he switched to art and began taking drawing lessons from a local artist. In 1867, a grant from the City Council of Alessandria enabled him to enroll at the Brera Academy, where he studied with Giuseppe Bertini and Raffaele Casnedi.

=== Early career ===
Upon graduating, Morbelli began to exhibit in Milan and Turin. His early works were primarily landscapes and historical scenes. His painting of Goethe's death (1880), was the first to bring him to the attention of the general public. In 1883, he changed his focus to contemporary subjects; most notably, depicting the elderly residents of the Pio Albergo Trivulzio, a retirement home and hospital. One of his works from that series, The Last Days, was awarded a gold medal at the Exposition Universelle in 1889. He would go on to produce other series addressing social issues. In the early 1880s he married Maria Pagani, who inspired several works on motherhood.

Morbelli's respect for the real had already led him to use photography in order to study the framing and composition of his images; but he had also seen something of French, German, English and Dutch Realism (for example the work of Hubert von Herkomer and Max Liebermann), in reproduction if not directly when travelling in Germany and France. In Asphyxia (1884; part in Turin, Galleria Civica di Arte Moderna, part in priv. col.), showing a suicide couple, and Sold (1884; Milan, Galleria di Arte Moderna) Morbelli adopted a cruder Realism. However, these paintings were not well received by critics, and in response Morbelli again began to concentrate on scenes from the Pio Albergo Trivulzio, producing works such as Last Sacrament (1884; Rome, Galleria Nazionale d'Arte Moderna), in which the brushstroke is deliberately broken up and there is an increasing use of juxtaposed pure colours in the search for greater atmospheric truth.

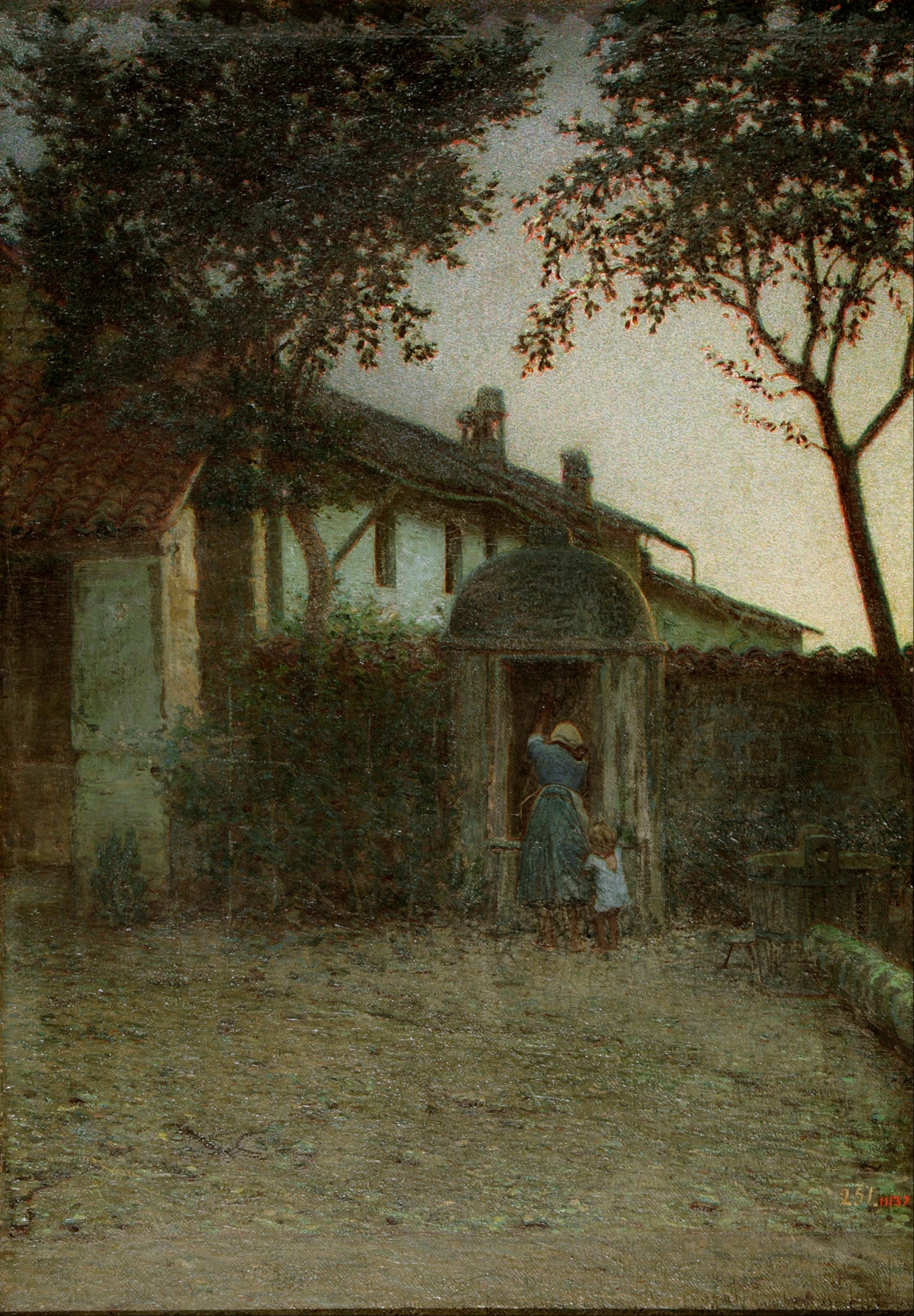
Dawn, 1891; Barcelona, Museu Nacional d'Art de Catalunya

Such experiments are further documented by the two versions of Milan Central Station (1887; Rome, Ferrovie dello Stato and 1889; Milan, Gallera di Arte Moderna), in which the sharpness of the image is lost in the attempt to convey a sense of atmosphere. In Dawn (1891; Barcelona, Museu Nacional d'Art de Catalunya), a calm scene of a woman and child at a farmyard pump, Morbelli accentuated the use of pure colours in accordance with the laws of complementarity, seeking to establish the mixture as a product of the observer's perception.

=== Divisionism ===
From this point onwards Morbelli was one of the leading exponents of Divisionism, and his experiments progressed with greater assurance: his brushstrokes became more deliberate and regular and his handling of light more secure. His initial works in that style were mostly landscapes, including the hills around Casale Monferrato, near a home he had recently purchased, and the farms outside of Vercelli. This phase culminated in the celebrated scene painted in the rice fields near Vercelli, For Eighty Cents (1895; Vercelli, Museo Civico Borgogna). The painting created a sensation, and was awarded the Dresden Gold Medal.

Morbelli then returned to some of his former themes, painting, for example, a Divisionist version of Sold! (1897; priv. col.). However, he continued to study the old people in the Pio Albergo Trivulzio, where he had obtained a room of his own in which to carry out his work. The numerous canvases he painted there constitute a true 'poem of old age' in which Morbelli compared the human condition with natural scenes. In A Map in Winter (1903; Alessandria, Pinacoteca Civica) he juxtaposed the white hair of his elderly sitters as it is reflected in the few rays of light coming through the window of the home, with the whiteness coming from outside, from the roofs of the city under snow. Other works in this group are the Christmas of Those Left Behind (1903; Venice, Ca' Pesaro) and Winter in the Pio Albergo Trivulzio (1909; Turin, Galleria Civica di Arte Moderna). At the Exposition Universelle of 1900, Morbelli was presented with another gold medal for Day of Celebration at the Pio Albergo Trivulzio.

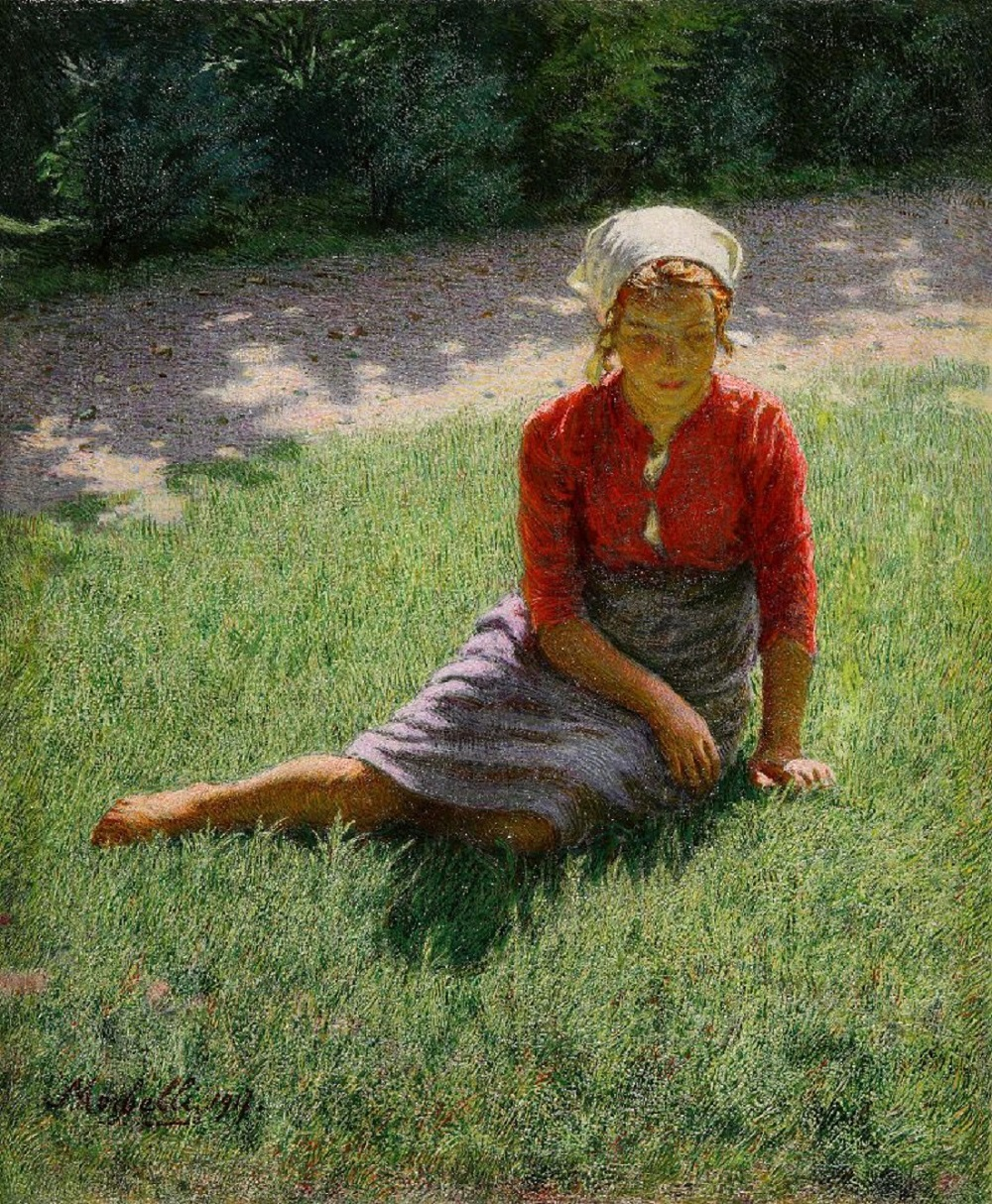
My Teresa, 1917; priv. col.

In the triptych Dream and Reality (1905) the Symbolist strain in these works comes to the fore: the interrelation of opposite principles is suggested by placing a symbol of young life and hope between images of age and memory. The centre of the triptych shows a young couple embracing on a balcony and turning to look upwards at the stars, while the side panels both show solitary old people.

Morbelli also carried out a large number of Divisionist landscapes, especially during his summers in the family country house at Colma di Rosignano near Montferrat, for example Sunday Dawn (1915; Piacenza, Galleria di Arte Moderna Ricci Oddi). In some of these works a note of abandon and of solitude reveals a melancholic and symbolic interpretation of landscape, as in 'Era già l'ora che volge al desio' (1913; priv. col.). Morbelli spent his last years alternating between winters in Milan and summers in Usseglio. In 1912, he began writing a book on Divisionism, in the form of a private diary. He died of pneumonia, aged sixty-six.

== Selected paintings ==
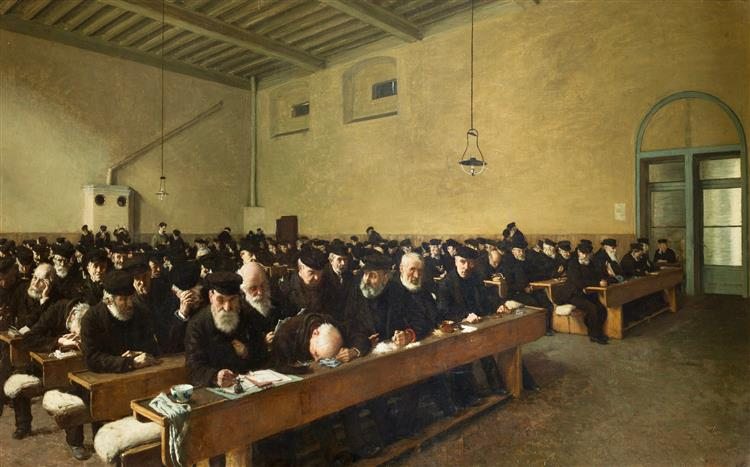
The Last Days

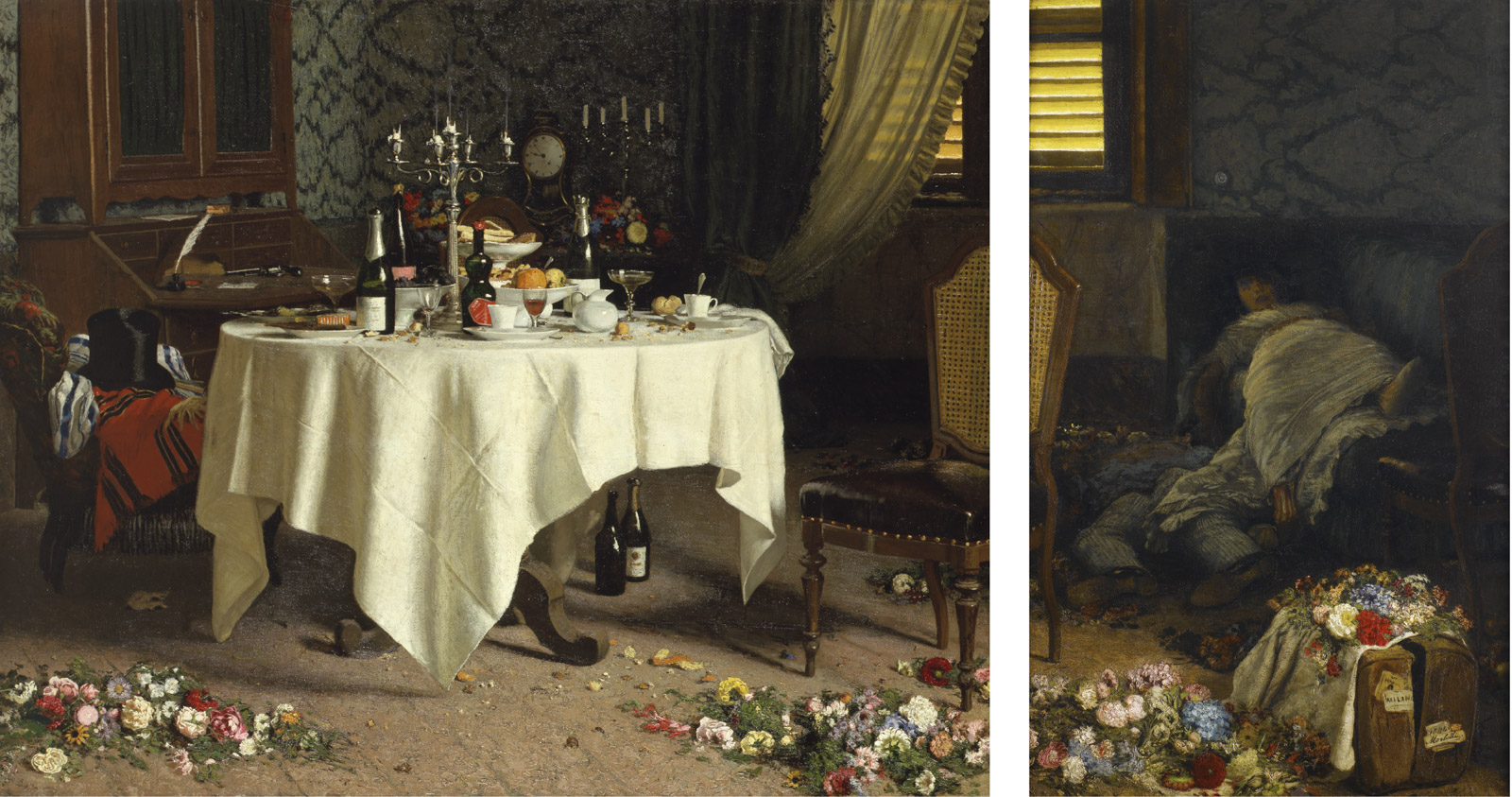
Asphyxia

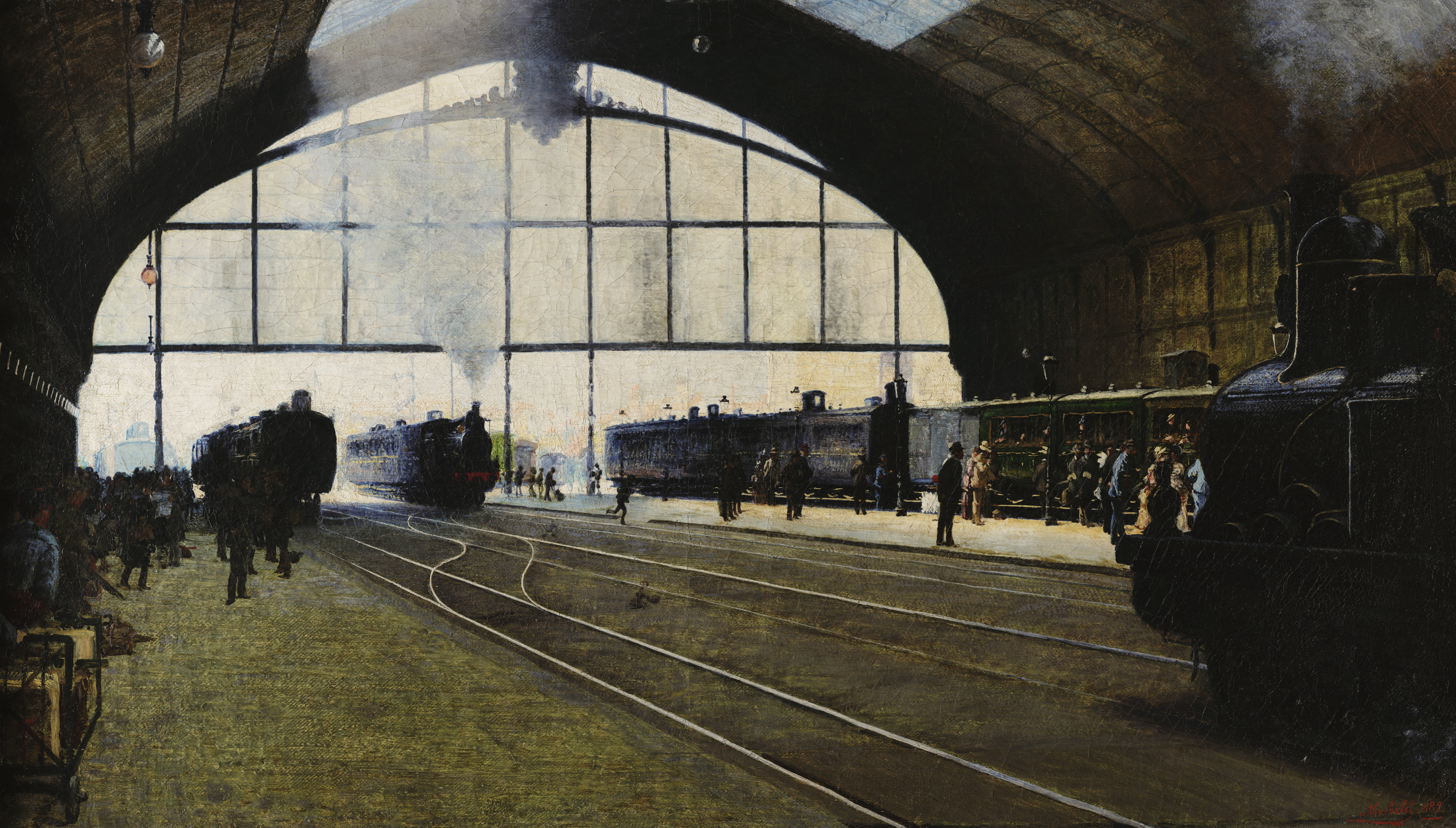
Milan Central Station

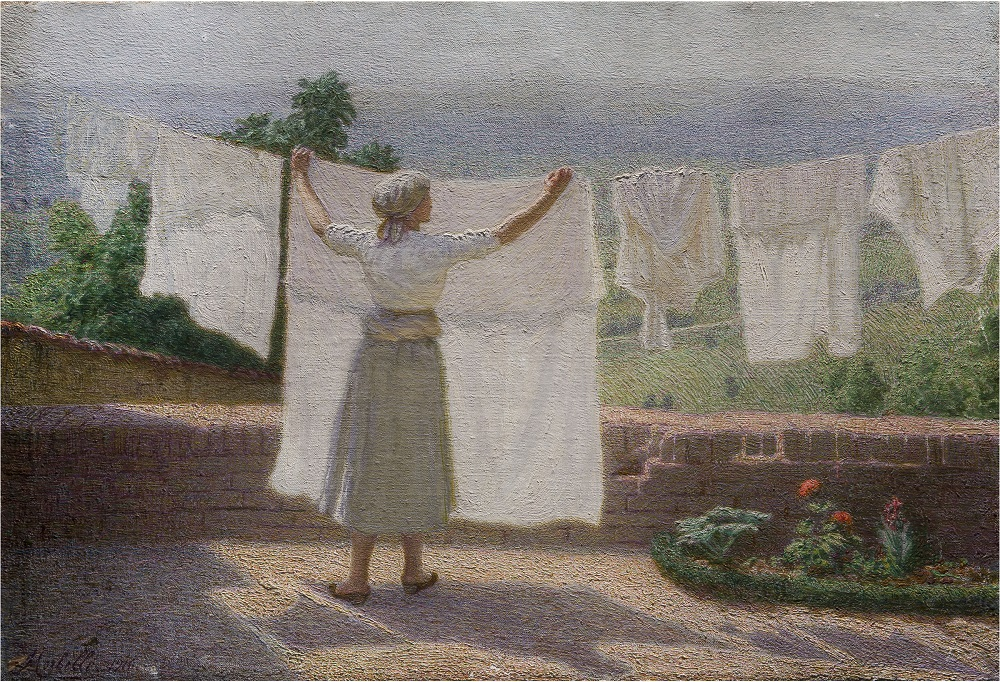
Hanging Clothes in the Sun

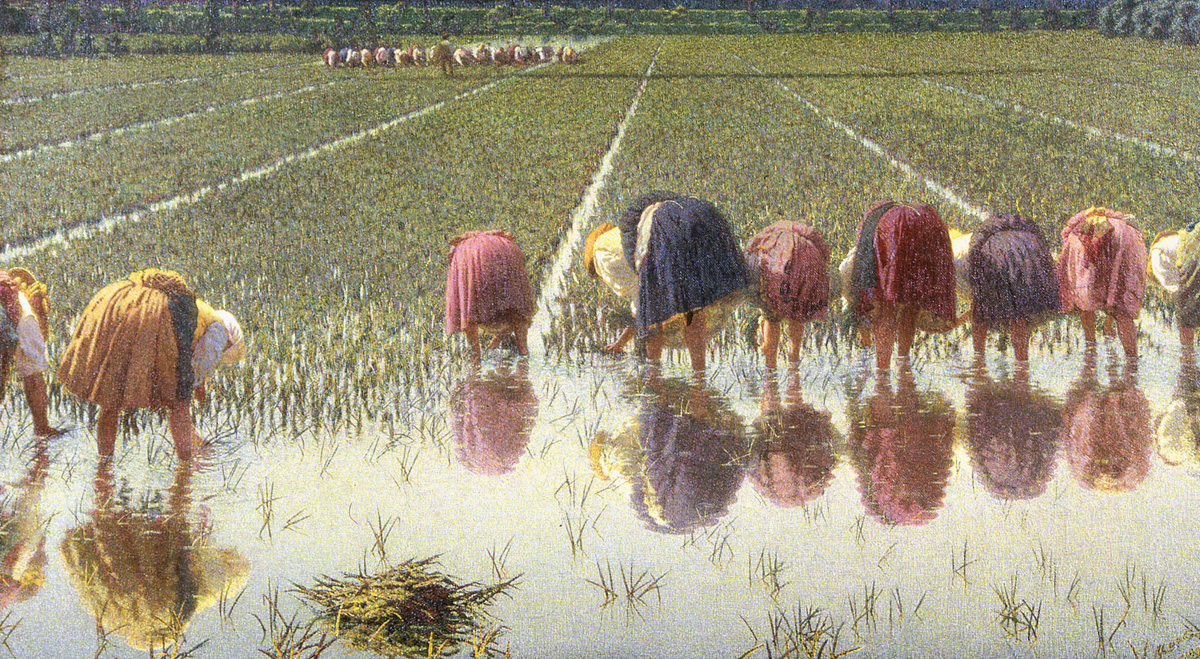
For Eighty Cents

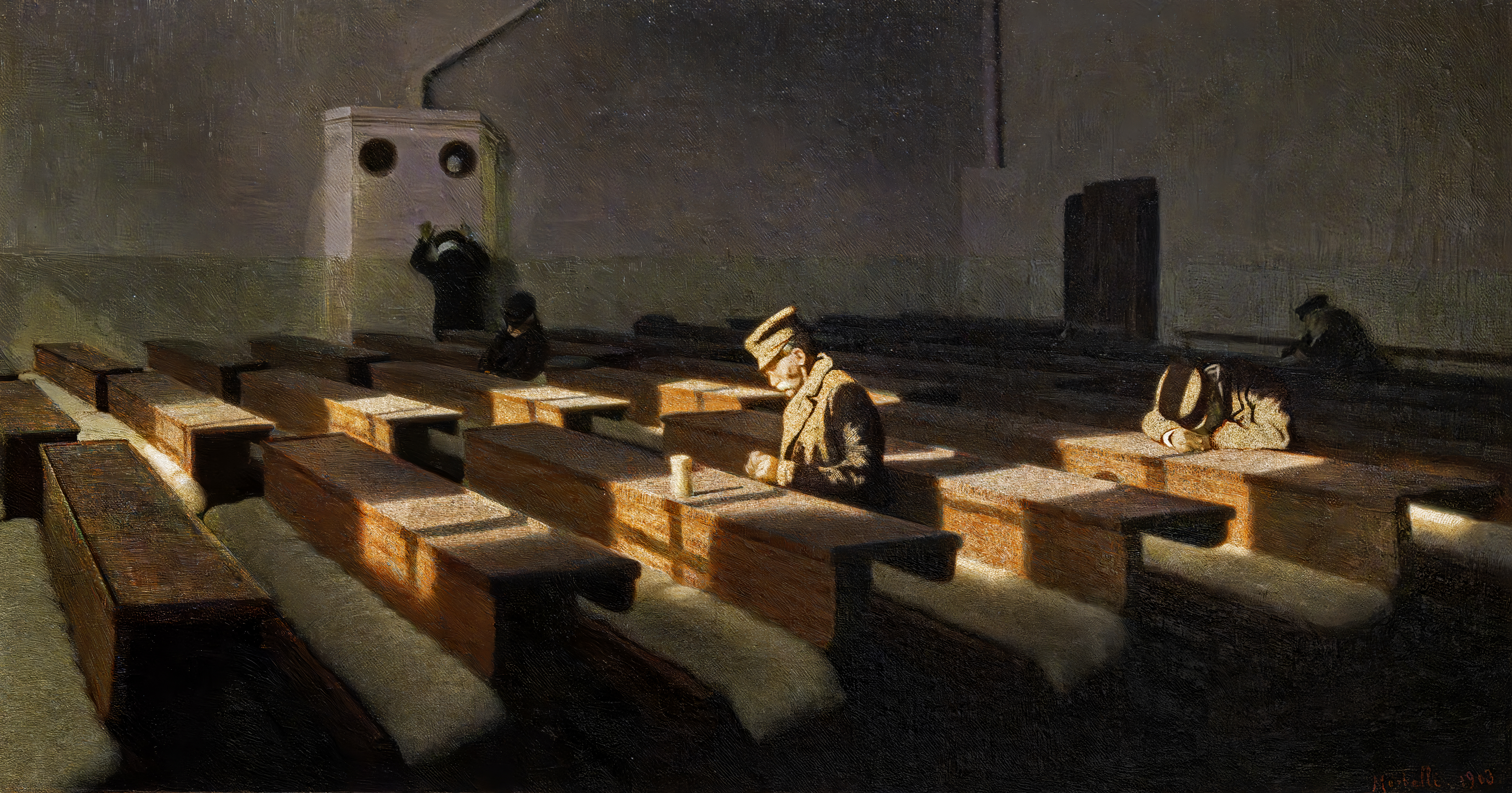
Christmas of Those Left Behind

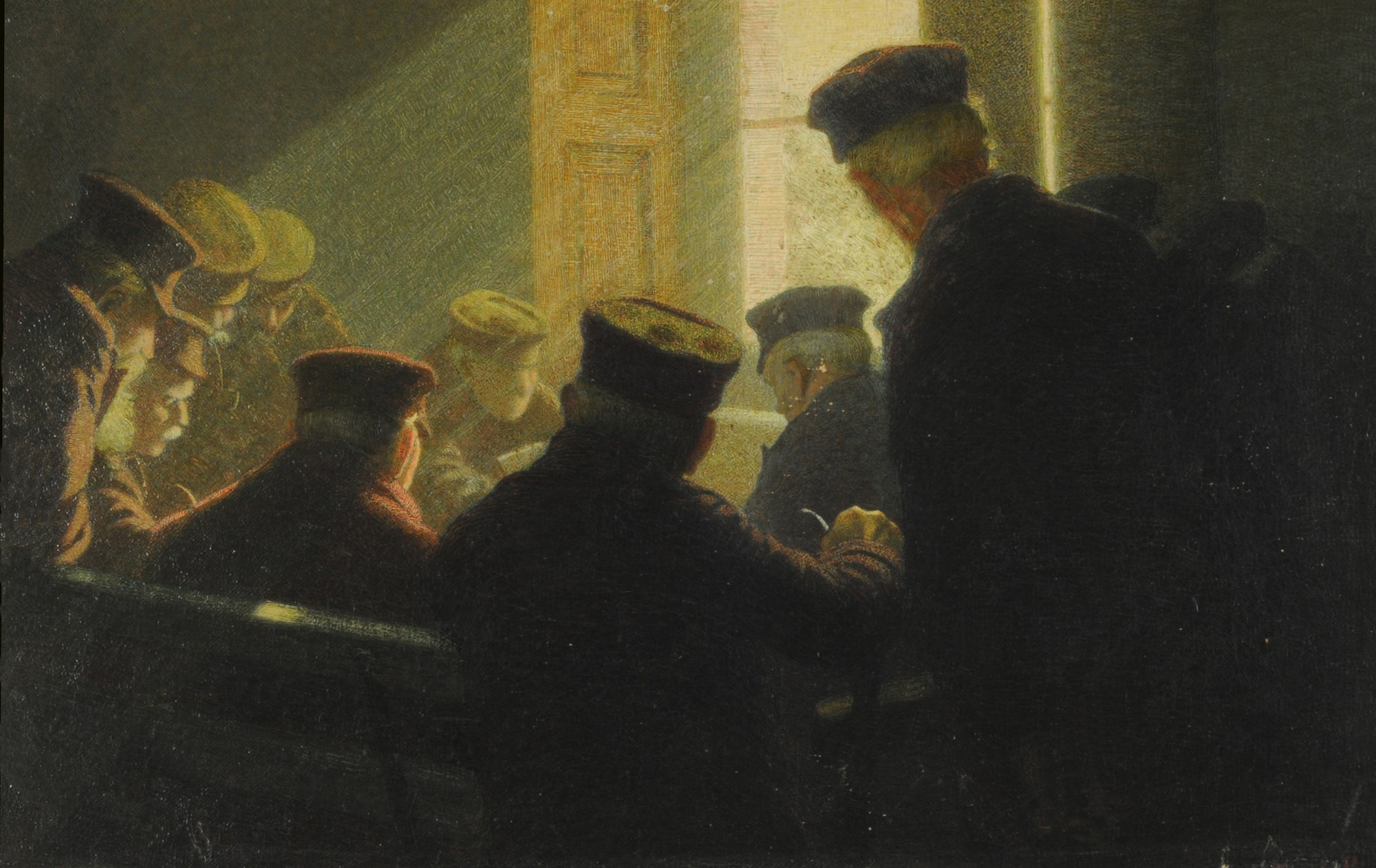
An Interesting Game

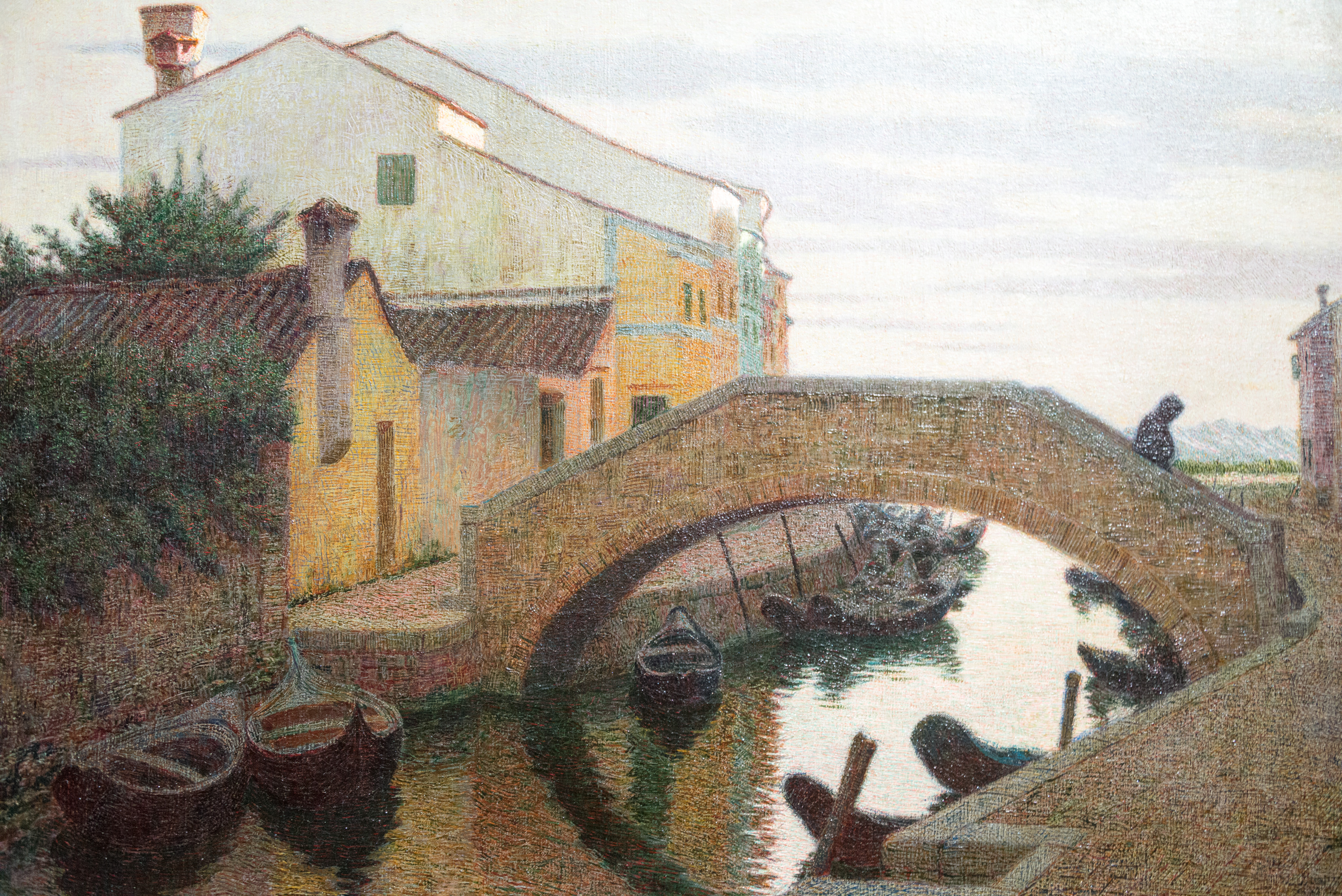
The First Mass at Burano

== Bibliography ==
- Canuti, Rossella (2012). "MORBELLI, Angelo". Dizionario Biografico degli Italiani (in Italian). Vol. 76: Montauti–Morlaiter. Rome: Istituto dell'Enciclopedia Italiana. ISBN 978-88-12-00032-6.
