= Ossona =

Ossona Ossòna (Lombard)
- Comune
- Comune di Ossona
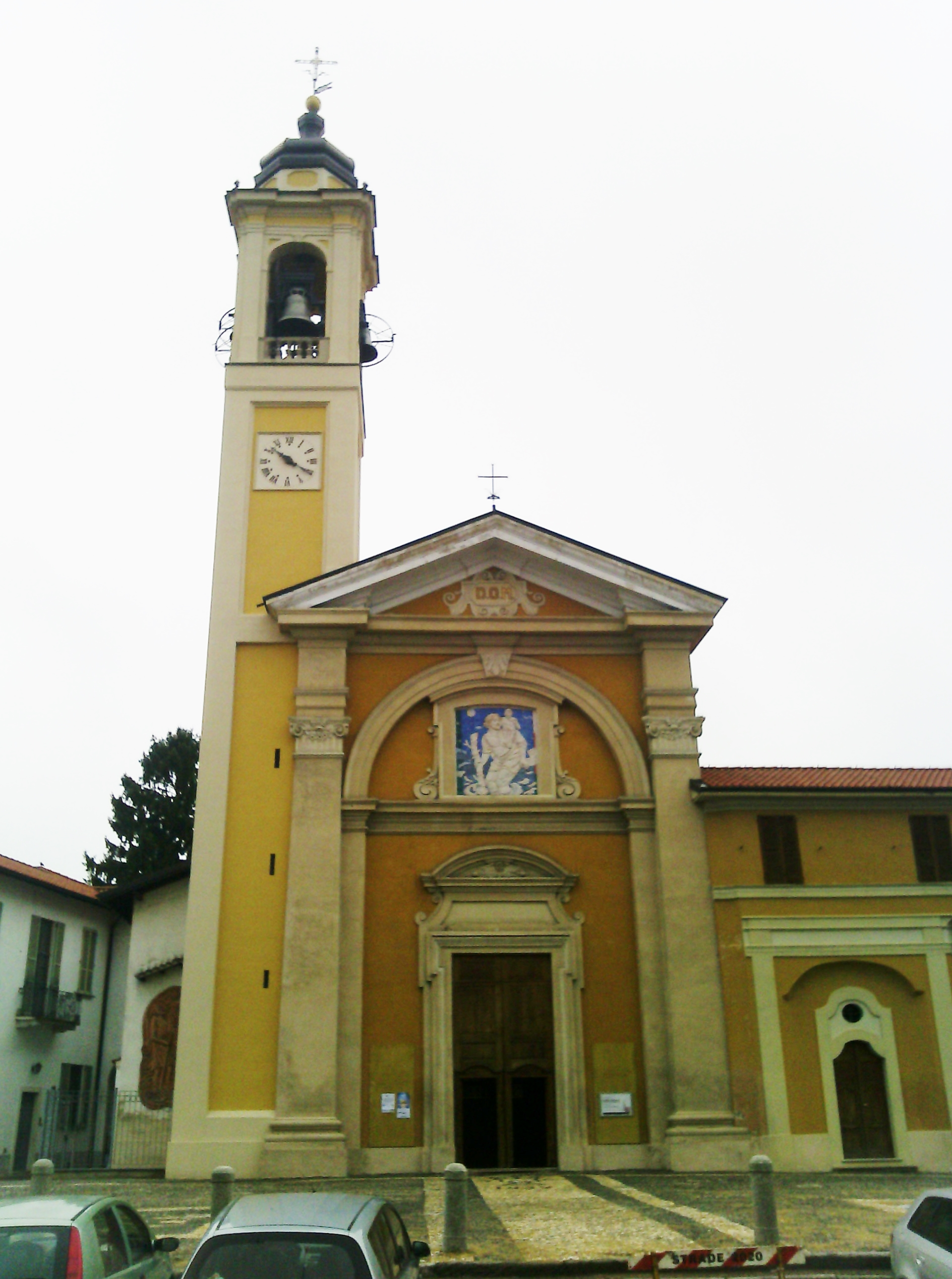
- St. Christopher Parish Church in Ossona

- Location within Italy Location within Lombardy
- Coordinates: 45°30′N 8°54′E
- Country: Italy
- Region: Lombardy
- Metropolitan city: Milan (MI)
- Frazioni: Asmonte

Area
  - Total: 6.0 km^{2} (2.3 sq mi)
- Elevation: 156 m (512 ft)

Population (Dec. 2004)
  - Total: 3,928
  - Density: 650/km^{2} (1,700/sq mi)
- Demonym: Ossonesi
- Time zone: UTC+1 (CET)
  - Summer (DST): UTC+2 (CEST)
- Postal code: 20010
- Dialing code: 02
- Website: Official website

Ossona (Milanese: Ossòna [uˈsɔna]) is a comune (municipality) in the Metropolitan City of Milan in the Italian region Lombardy, located about 20 kilometres (12 mi) west of Milan. As of 31 December 2004, it had a population of 3,928 and an area of 6.0 square kilometres (2.3 mi^{2}).

The municipality of Ossona contains the frazione (subdivision) Asmonte.

Ossona borders the following municipalities: Casorezzo, Inveruno, Arluno, Mesero, Marcallo con Casone, Santo Stefano Ticino.

== Demographic evolution ==
Historical population

Year	Pop.	±%
1861	1,284	—
1871	1,269	−1.2%
1881	1,356	+6.9%
1901	1,561	+15.1%
1911	1,796	+15.1%

Year	Pop.	±%
1921	1,905	+6.1%
1931	2,090	+9.7%
1936	2,214	+5.9%
1951	2,536	+14.5%
1961	2,616	+3.2%

Year	Pop.	±%
1971	3,071	+17.4%
1981	3,325	+8.3%
1991	3,463	+4.2%
2001	3,757	+8.5%

Source: Data from ISTAT
