= Vanzago =

Vanzago Vanzagh (Lombard)
- Comune
- Comune di Vanzago
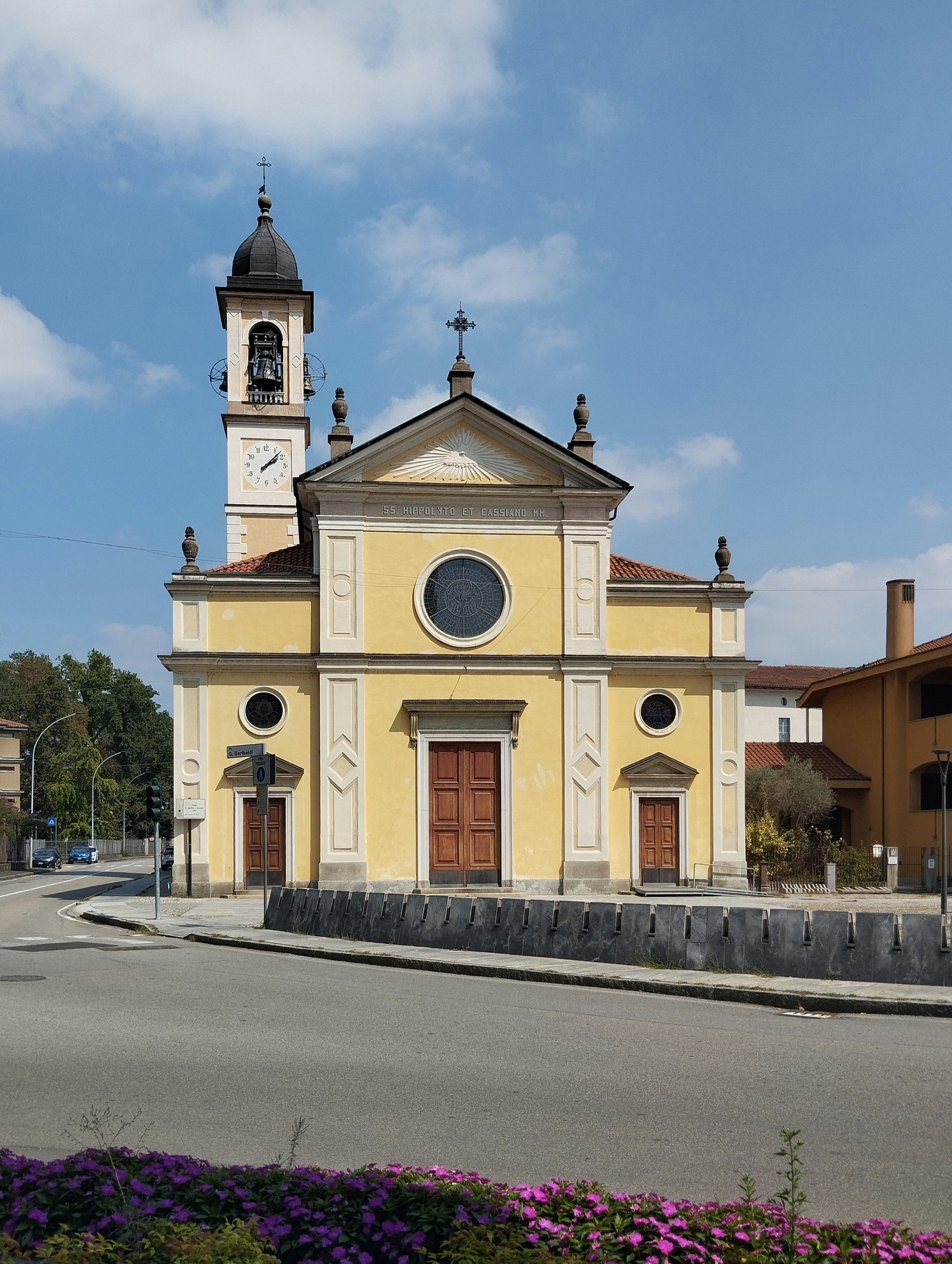
- The church of Santi Ippolito and Cassiano

- Location within Italy Location within Lombardy
- Coordinates: 45°32′N 9°0′E
- Country: Italy
- Region: Lombardy
- Metropolitan city: Milan (MI)
- Frazioni: Mantegazza, Valdarenne, Tre Campane

Area
  - Total: 6.2 km^{2} (2.4 sq mi)
- Elevation: 154 m (505 ft)

Population (Dec. 2004)
  - Total: 7,615
  - Density: 1,200/km^{2} (3,200/sq mi)
- Demonym: Vanzaghesi
- Time zone: UTC+1 (CET)
  - Summer (DST): UTC+2 (CEST)
- Postal code: 20043
- Dialing code: 02
- Website: Official website

Vanzago (Lombard: Vansach [ʋãˈsaːk]) is a comune (municipality) in the Province of Milan in the Italian region Lombardy, located about 15 kilometres (9 mi) northwest of Milan. As of 31 December 2004, it had a population of 7,615 and an area of 6.2 square kilometres (2.4 mi^{2}).

The municipality of Vanzago contains the frazioni (subdivisions, mainly villages and hamlets) Mantegazza, Valdarenne, and Tre Campane.

Vanzago borders the following municipalities: Pogliano Milanese, Pregnana Milanese, Arluno, Sedriano.

== Demographic evolution ==
Historical population

Year	Pop.	±%
1861	1,492	—
1871	1,453	−2.6%
1881	1,617	+11.3%
1901	2,069	+28.0%
1911	2,390	+15.5%

Year	Pop.	±%
1921	2,622	+9.7%
1931	3,076	+17.3%
1936	3,191	+3.7%
1951	3,710	+16.3%
1961	4,187	+12.9%

Year	Pop.	±%
1971	5,014	+19.8%
1981	5,139	+2.5%
1991	5,668	+10.3%
2001	6,783	+19.7%

Source: Data from ISTAT

== WWF ==
The natural area is also known for the World Wide Fund for Nature reserve, an organisation for the protection of the environment and endangered species. It was established in 1978 under the name of Bosco di Vanzago.
