= San Francesco, Trecate =

Church in Trecate, Italy

Coordinates: 45.43039°N 8.73398°E

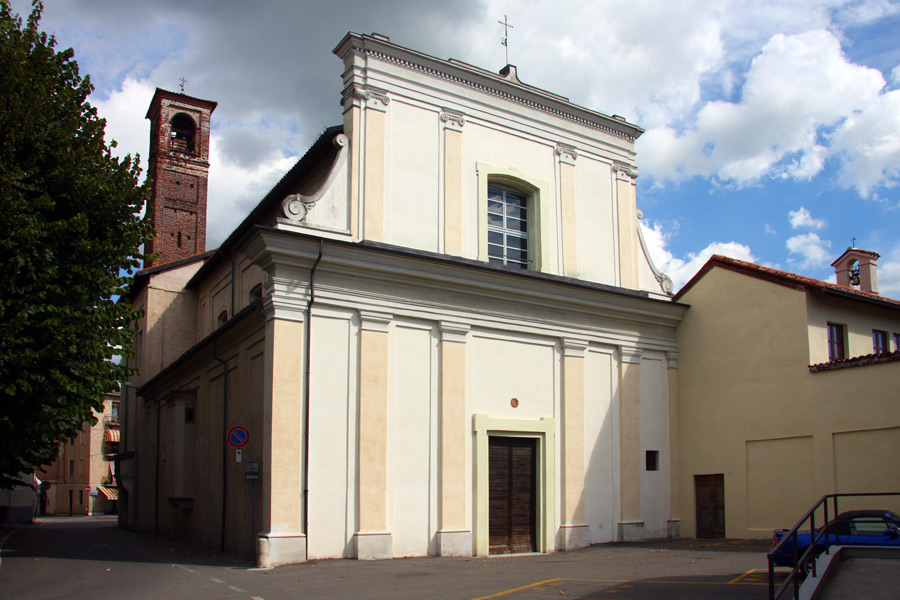
Trecate SanFrascesco.jpg

Santa Francesco is a Roman Catholic church in the town limits of Trecate, Province of Novara, Piedmont, Italy.

== History ==
Franciscans arrived to this town in 1494, and occupied a convent formerly of nuns of the Umiliati order. That convent had been established in the 13th-century. In 1514, the convent was assigned to the Franciscans. The church was rebuilt in the 17th century in its present layout.

A 1985 restoration of the church uncovered frescoes (1595) attributed to il Cerano, depicting the Conversion of St Paul. It is documented that the frescoes were commissioned by the Cicogna family from Trecate. The vault of the choir contains frescoes depicting Scenes from the Bible by Carlo Francesco Nuvolone.
