= Arluno =

- Comune
- Comune di Arluno
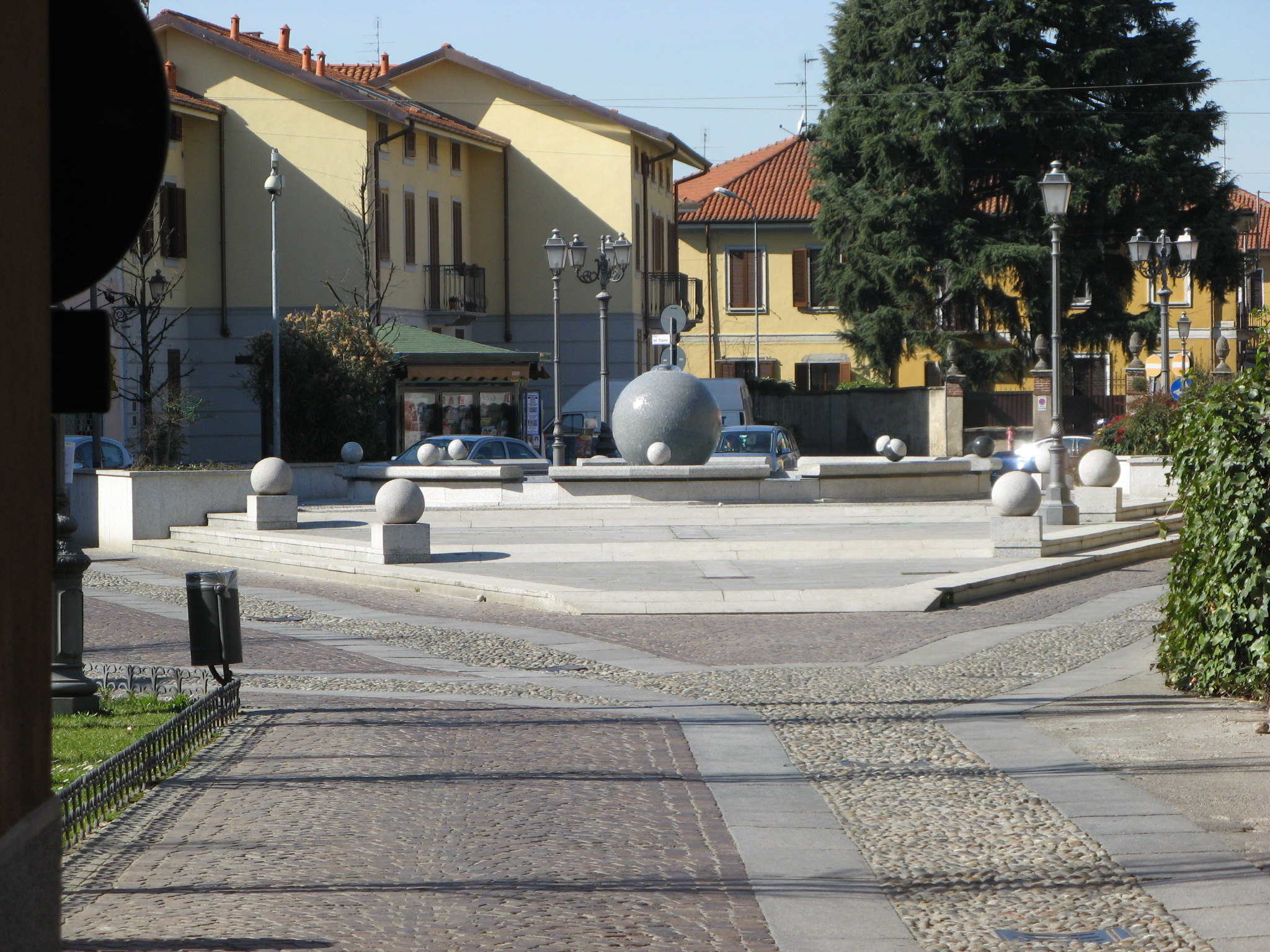
- View of Arluno

- Coat of arms

- Location within Italy Location within Lombardy
- Coordinates: 45°30′N 8°56′E
- Country: Italy
- Region: Lombardy
- Metropolitan city: Milan (MI)
- Frazioni: Cascina Poglianasca, Rogorotto, Cascina Malpensa, Cascina Frisasca

Government
  - Mayor: Moreno Agolli

Area
  - Total: 12.4 km^{2} (4.8 sq mi)
- Elevation: 156 m (512 ft)

Population (31 January 2015)
  - Total: 11,882
  - Density: 958/km^{2} (2,480/sq mi)
- Demonym: Arlunesi
- Time zone: UTC+1 (CET)
  - Summer (DST): UTC+2 (CEST)
- Postal code: 20010
- Dialing code: 02
- Website: Official website

Arluno (Lombard: Arlun [arˈlỹː], locally Arlugn [arˈlyɲ]) is a comune (municipality) in the Metropolitan City of Milan in the Italian region Lombardy, located about 20 miles (32 km) west of Milan.

Arluno borders the following municipalities: Parabiago, Nerviano, Pogliano Milanese, Casorezzo, Vanzago, Ossona, Sedriano, Santo Stefano Ticino, Vittuone, and Corbetta.

== Twin Town ==
Arluno is twinned with:

- San Justo, Santa Fe, Argentina, since 2007
