= Giovanni Sottocornola =

Italian painter (1855–1917)

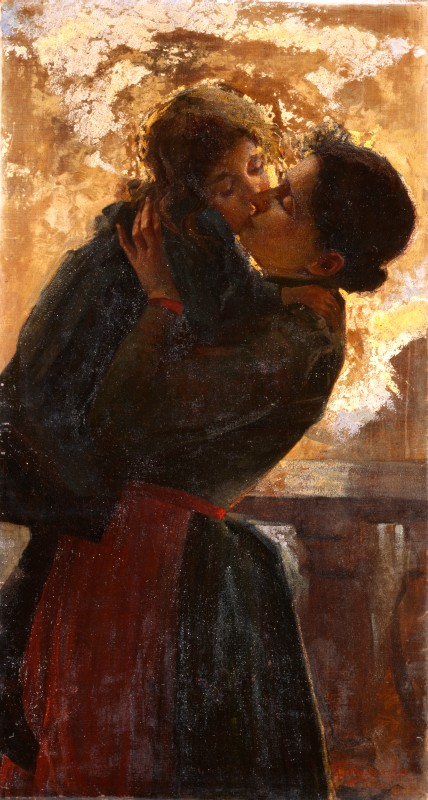
Maternal Joy

Giovanni Sottocornola (1 August 1855 – 12 February 1917) was an Italian painter and art restorer.

== Biography ==
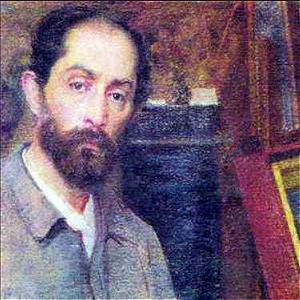
Self-portrait (1895)

He was born in Milan to a working-class family. His father died when he was still a boy, and he became largely responsible for supporting his siblings. In 1875, he was able to enroll at the Brera Academy, where he studied with Raffaele Casnedi and Giuseppe Bertini. He graduated in 1880. Two years later he had his first exhibition, at the Academy. His early works were mostly portraits and still-lifes, in the Naturalist style.

In 1883, he married Luigia Carati and they would have four children, two of whom died as infants. The others, Anita and Maria, often served as his models. Their portraits were among the numerous paintings he exhibited throughout Northern Italy in the 1880s. He also participated in an exhibition of Italian paintings held in Montevideo in 1889.

After 1891, he began to address social themes and experimented with Divisionism. In 1898, he participated in another exhibition in Latin America; this time in Buenos Aires.

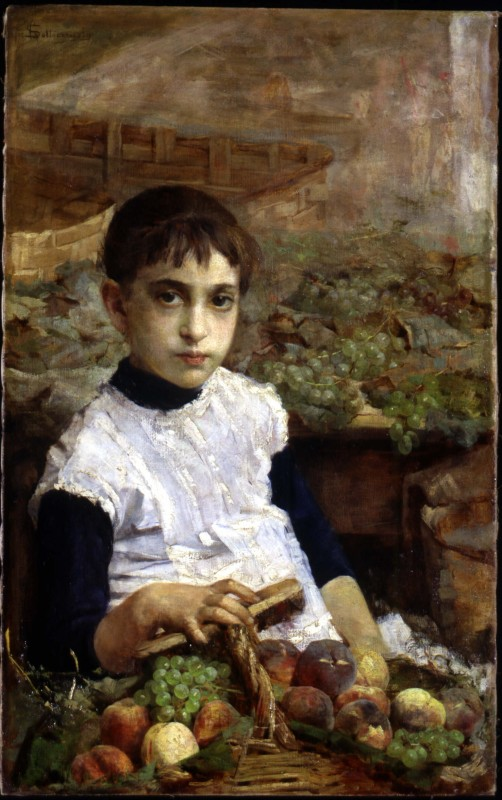
The Young Fruit Seller

By 1900, he was once again devoting himself to portraits and domestic scenes, mostly with female subjects, and used pastels in addition to oils. He also created some landscapes in the mountains around Valassina. Shortly after, he opened his own private, co-educational art school.

During this time, he also worked to restore paintings by Bernardino Luini at the Church of St. Maurice in the Monastero Maggiore, and at the Church of San Antonio.

He died suddenly in Milan and was buried in the Monumental Cemetery of Milan.
