= Francesco Didioni =

Italian painter (1839–1895)

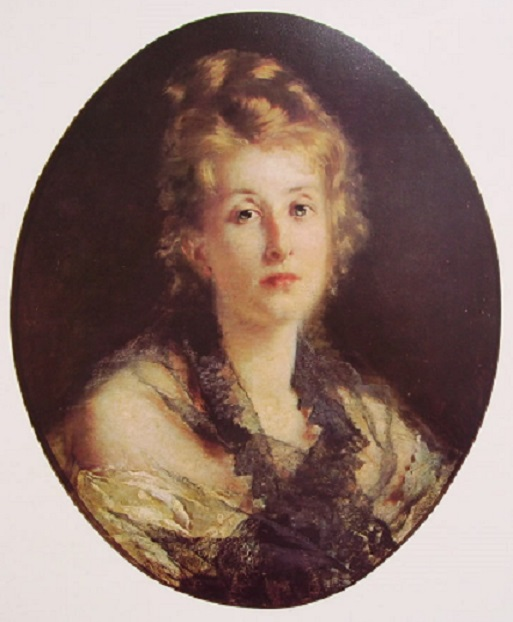
Portrait of a Young Blonde Woman

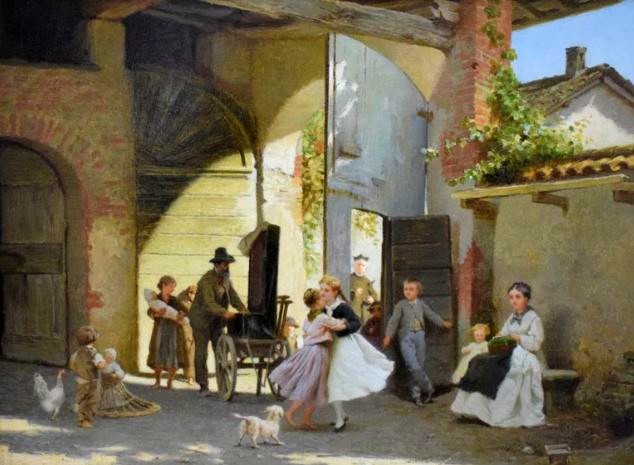
A Courtyard with Children

Francesco Didioni (1839, Milan –27 July 1895, Stresa) was an Italian painter of portraits and genre scenes.

== Life and work ==
He studied at the Accademia di Brera, with Raffaele Casnedi and Francesco Hayez. In 1861, while still a student, he won his first competition with a drawing of a military ambulance. At first, he devoted himself almost entirely to portraiture, with a style influenced by Tranquillo Cremona. His best-known is, however, a later work: Portrait of a Young Blonde Woman (1888), preserved at the Galleria d'Arte Moderna, Milan.

His first historical paintings were The Death of Gian Maria Visconti, Duke of Milan (1862) and The Funeral of Judas Maccabeus (1864). The most familiar is Reasons of State (1881), depicting Napoleon's divorce from Josephine de Beauharnais. It became very popular and several etchings of it were made.

He is interred at the Cimitero Monumentale di Milano.
