= Alfredo Colombo =

Italian footballer (born 1921)

Personal information
- Date of birth: 25 July 1921
- Place of birth: Boffalora, Province of Milan, Italy
- Position: Midfielder

Senior career*
Years	Team	Apps	(Gls)
1946–1947	Magenta		
1947–1948	Internazionale	1	(0)
1948–1949	Sanremese		
1949–1951	Pistoiese	66	(15)
1951–1952	Alessandria	15	(9)
1952–1953	Gallaratese		
- * Club domestic league appearances and goals

Alfredo Colombo (born 25 July 1921) is an Italian retired professional football player.
