= Casorezzo =

- Comune
- Comune di Casorezzo
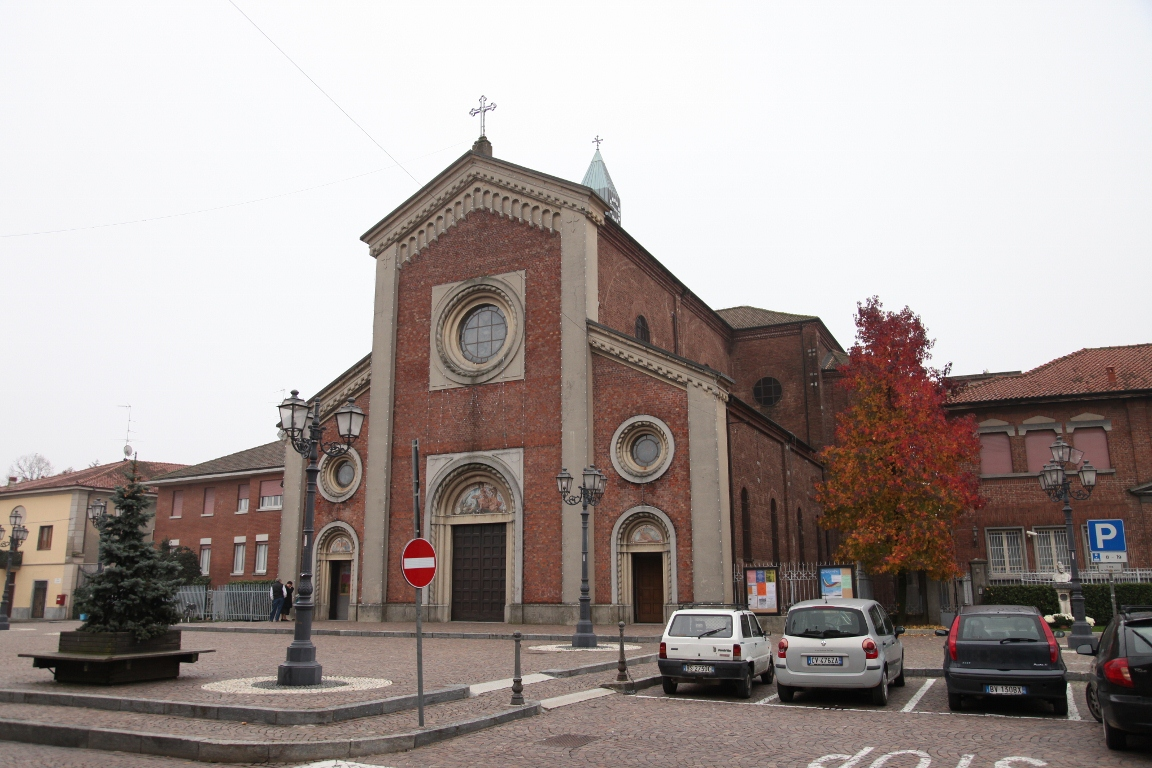
- The church of San Giorgio

- Coat of arms

- Location within Italy Location within Lombardy
- Coordinates: 45°31′N 8°54′E
- Country: Italy
- Region: Lombardy
- Metropolitan city: Milan (MI)
- Frazioni: Arluno, Busto Garolfo, Inveruno, Ossona, Parabiago

Area
  - Total: 6 km^{2} (2.3 sq mi)

Population (2018-01-01)
  - Total: 4,628
  - Density: 770/km^{2} (2,000/sq mi)
- Demonym: Casorezzesi
- Time zone: UTC+1 (CET)
  - Summer (DST): UTC+2 (CEST)
- Postal code: 20003 (prev. 20010)
- Dialing code: 02
- ISTAT code: 015058
- Website: Official website

Casorezzo (Lombard: Casorezz [kazuˈrɛs], locally Casoesso [kazuˈesu]) is a town and comune in the Metropolitan City of Milan, Lombardy, northern Italy, about 25 kilometres (16 mi) from Milan, Italy.
