= Marcallo con Casone =

Marcallo con Casone Marcall cont el Cason (Lombard)
- Comune
- Comune di Marcallo con Casone
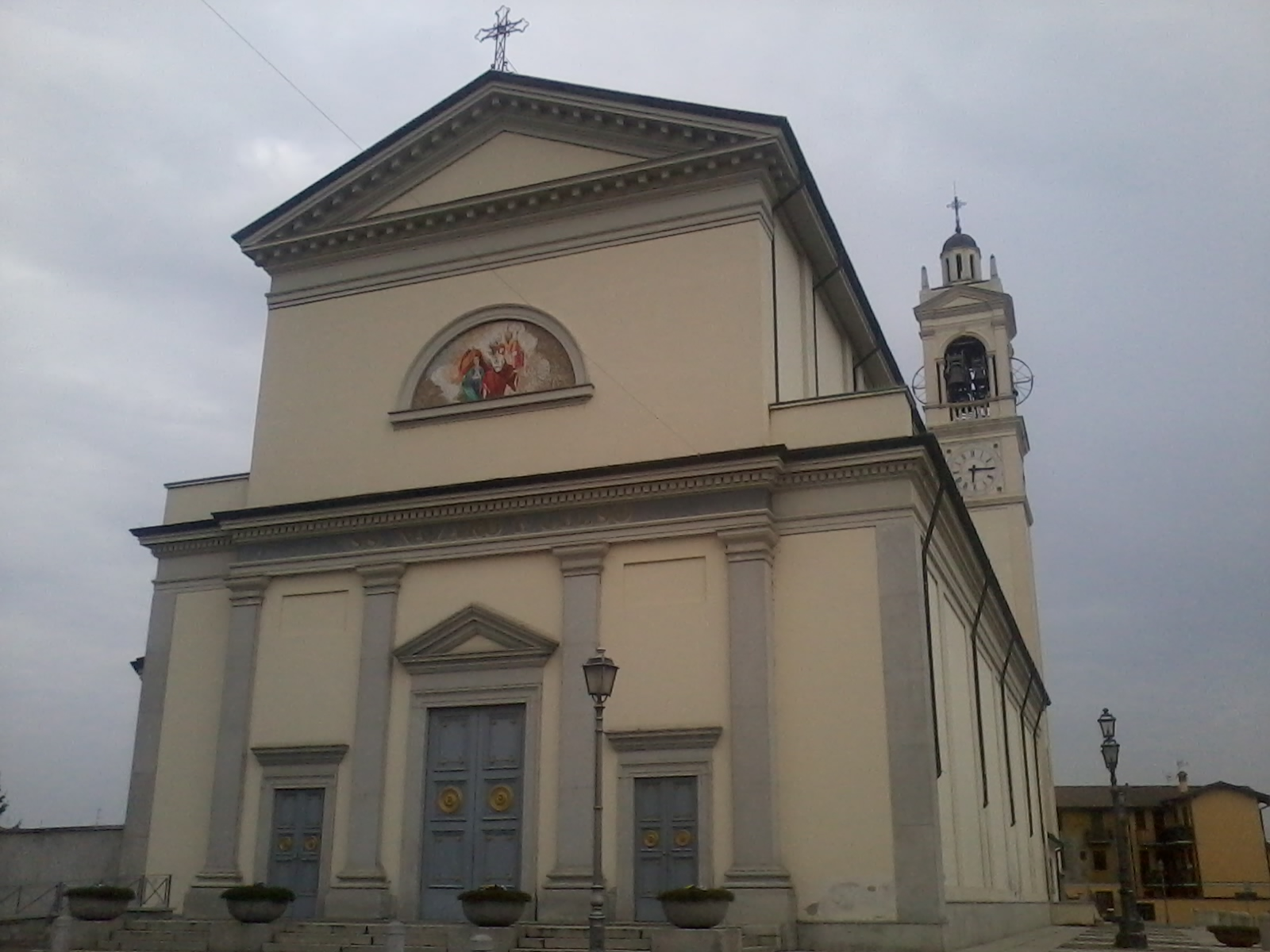

- Location within Italy Location within Lombardy
- Coordinates: 45°29′N 8°53′E
- Country: Italy
- Region: Lombardy
- Metropolitan city: Milan (MI)
- Frazioni: Casone

Government
  - Mayor: Marina Roma

Area
  - Total: 8.21 km^{2} (3.17 sq mi)
- Elevation: 147 m (482 ft)

Population (Apr. 2011)
  - Total: 6,055
  - Density: 738/km^{2} (1,910/sq mi)
- Demonym: Marcallesi
- Time zone: UTC+1 (CET)
  - Summer (DST): UTC+2 (CEST)
- Postal code: 20010
- Dialing code: 02
- Website: Official website

Marcallo con Casone (Milanese: Marcall cont el Cason [marˈkal kũt el kaˈzũː]) is a comune (municipality) in the Metropolitan City of Milan in the Italian region Lombardy, located about 20 kilometres (12 mi) west of Milan.

Marcallo con Casone borders the following municipalities: Ossona, Mesero, Santo Stefano Ticino, Bernate Ticino, Magenta, Boffalora sopra Ticino.

== Twin towns ==
Marcallo con Casone is twinned with:

- Bubry, France
- (Republic of Ireland) Macroom, Ireland
