= Santa Maria Assunta, Trecate =

Roman Catholic church in Trecate, Italy

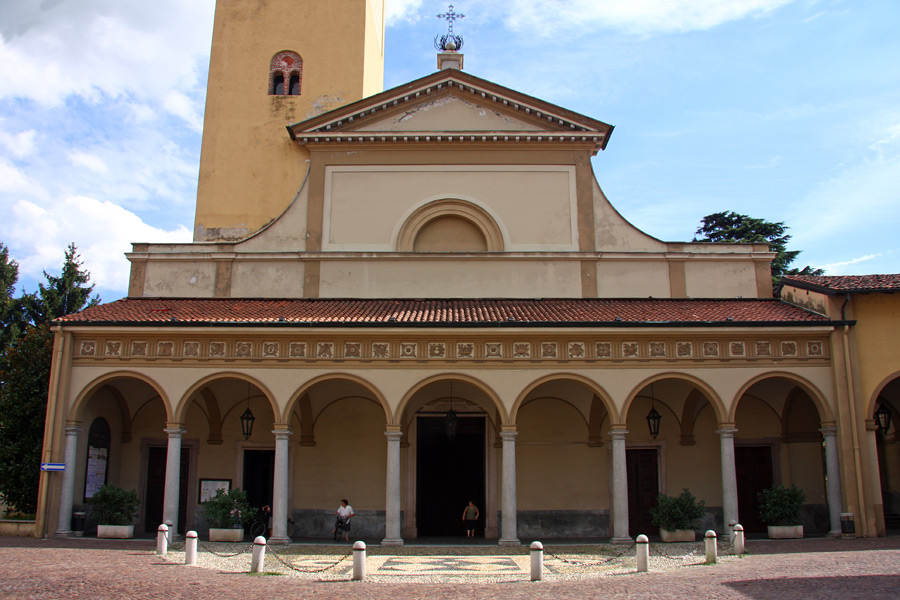

Santa Maria Assunta is the Roman Catholic parish church of Trecate, province of Novara, Piedmont, Italy.

== History ==
The church was founded in the 14th century, but remodeled over the centuries. The interior has a 14th-century fresco depicting St Catherine of Alexandria. The simple lines of the Neoclassical façade with an arched portico (1826) were designed by the architect Melchioni. The originally Gothic-style interior has three naves. The main altar (1691) was built with polychrome marbles, designed by Cesare Fiori. Below a canopy resting on six solomonic columns of black marble, is a marble statuary group (1707) depicting the Assumption of the Virgin Mary surrounded by angels. The Scurolo of Santo Clemente (St Clement) (1759), or reliquary tempietto, contains the relics of the patron saint of Trecate; it was designed by Francesco Croce, and painted with frescoes depicting Scenes from the Bible (1761) by Lorenzo Peracino. It once sheltered relics of San Cassiano.
