= Mesero =

Comune in the Metropolitan City of Milan, Italy

Mesero Mesar (Lombard)
- Comune
- Comune di Mesero
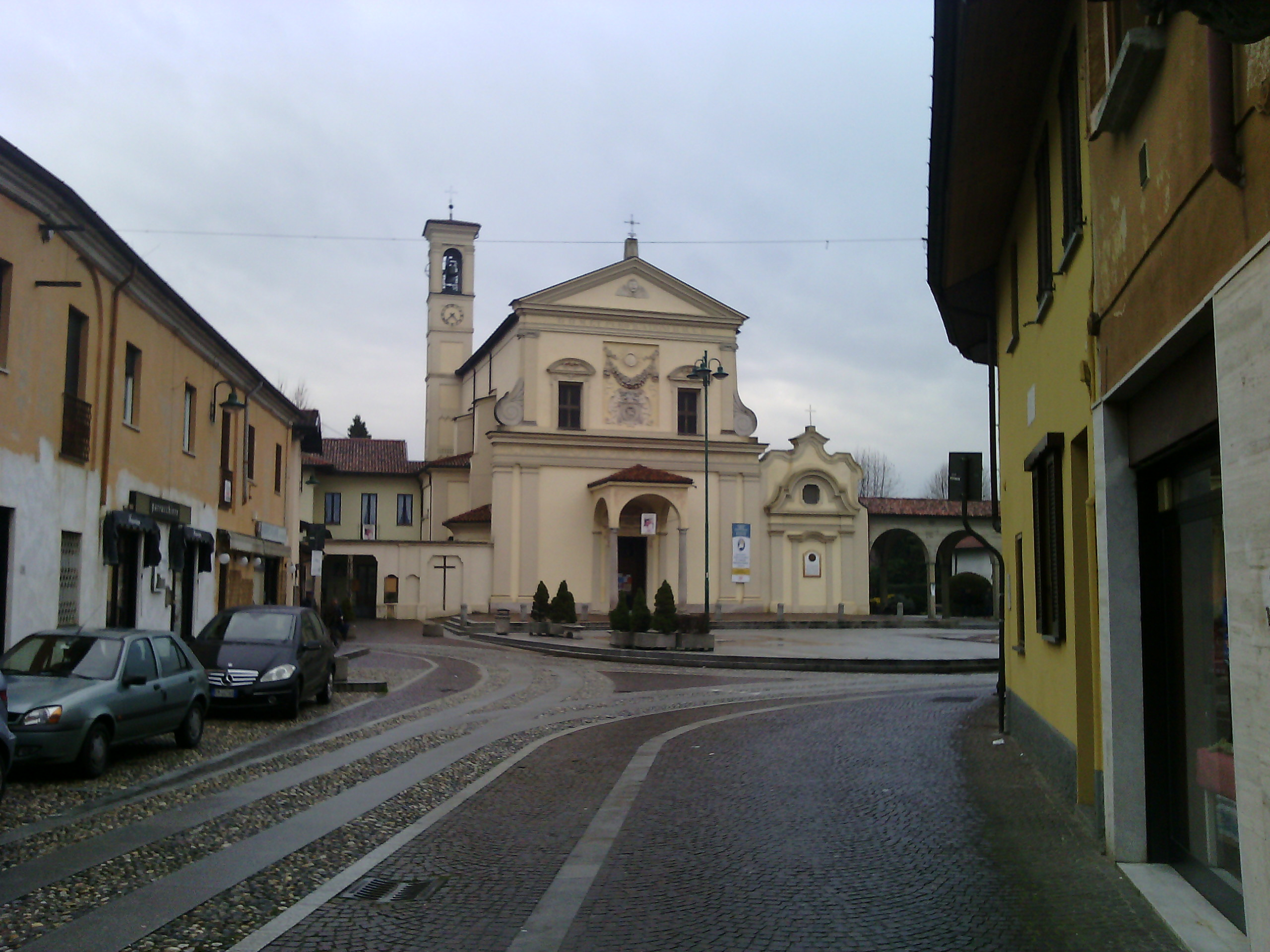
- The church of Mesero

- Coat of arms

- Location within Italy Location within Lombardy
- Coordinates: 45°30′N 8°51′E
- Country: Italy
- Region: Lombardy
- Metropolitan city: Milan (MI)

Government
  - Mayor: Davide Garavaglia

Area
  - Total: 5.7 km^{2} (2.2 sq mi)

Population (2007)
  - Total: 3,716
  - Density: 650/km^{2} (1,700/sq mi)
- Demonym: Meseresi
- Time zone: UTC+1 (CET)
  - Summer (DST): UTC+2 (CEST)
- Postal code: 20010
- Dialing code: 02
- Website: Official website

Mesero (Italian: [ˈmeːzero]; Milanese: Mesar [ˈmeːzar]) is a comune (municipality) in the Metropolitan City of Milan in the Italian region Lombardy, located about 25 kilometres (16 mi) west of Milan.

Mesero borders the following municipalities: Inveruno, Cuggiono, Ossona, Marcallo con Casone, Bernate Ticino.
