= Inveruno =

- Comune
- Comune di Inveruno
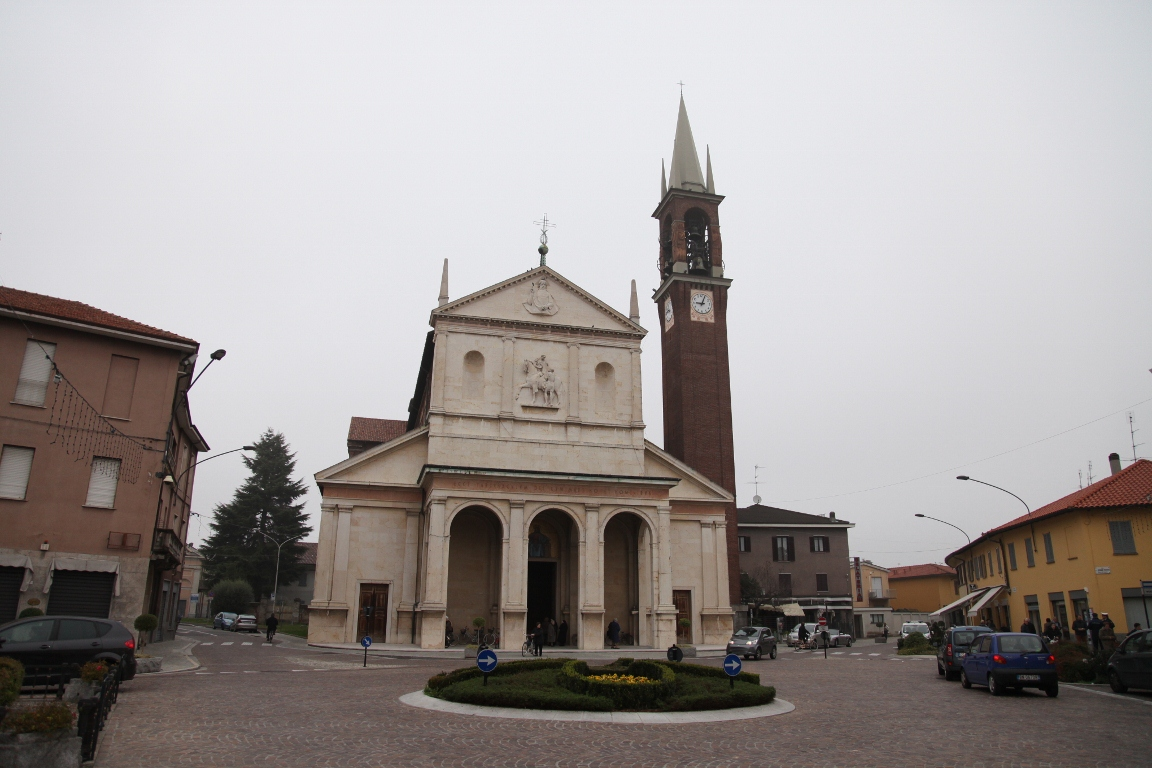

- Location within Italy Location within Lombardy
- Coordinates: 45°31′N 8°51′E
- Country: Italy
- Region: Lombardy
- Metropolitan city: Milan (MI)

Government
  - Mayor: Nicoletta Saveri

Area
  - Total: 12.2 km^{2} (4.7 sq mi)
- Elevation: 161 m (528 ft)

Population (01 January 2021)
  - Total: 8,509
  - Density: 697/km^{2} (1,810/sq mi)
- Demonym: Inverunesi
- Time zone: UTC+1 (CET)
  - Summer (DST): UTC+2 (CEST)
- Postal code: 20001
- Dialing code: 02
- Website: Official website

Inveruno (Lombard: Inverun [ĩʋeˈrỹː] or Invrugn [ĩˈʋryɲ] is a comune (municipality) in the Metropolitan City of Milan in the Italian region Lombardy, located about 25 kilometres (16 mi) west of Milan.

Inveruno borders the following municipalities: Buscate, Busto Garolfo, Arconate, Casorezzo, Cuggiono, Ossona, Mesero.
