= Trecate =

- Comune
- Comune di Trecate
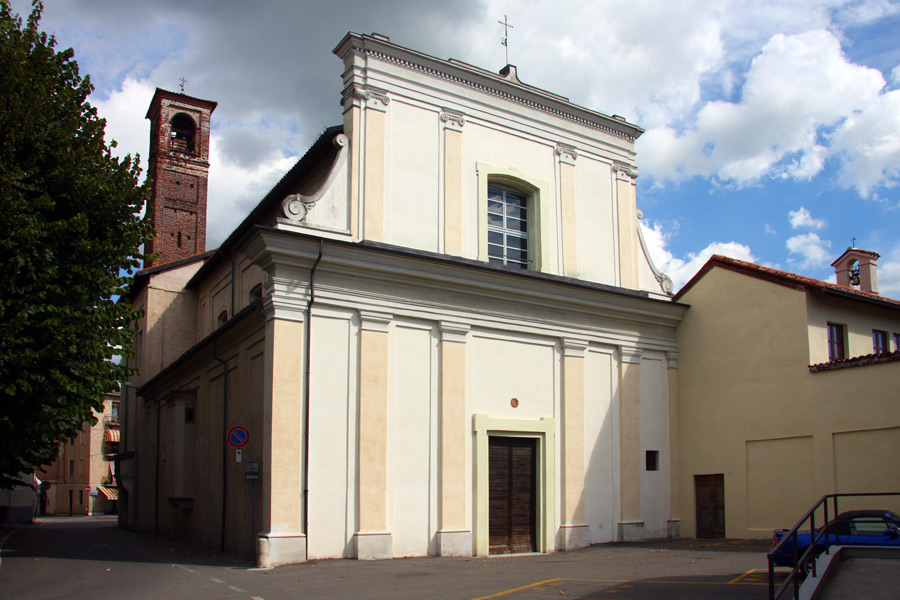
- San Francesco

- Coat of arms

- Location within Italy Location within Piedmont
- Coordinates: 45°26′N 8°44′E
- Country: Italy
- Region: Piedmont
- Province: Novara (NO)
- Frazioni: San Martino

Government
  - Mayor: Federico Binatti

Area
  - Total: 38.4 km^{2} (14.8 sq mi)
- Elevation: 136 m (446 ft)

Population (30 October 2017)
  - Total: 20,557
  - Density: 535/km^{2} (1,390/sq mi)
- Demonym: Trecatesi
- Time zone: UTC+1 (CET)
  - Summer (DST): UTC+2 (CEST)
- Postal code: 28069
- Dialing code: 0321
- Patron saint: St. Cassianus and Clement
- Website: Official website

Trecate is a comune (municipality) in the Province of Novara in the Italian region Piedmont, located about 90 kilometres (56 mi) northeast of Turin and about 9 kilometres (6 mi) east of Novara.

It harbors a major refinery complex for fuels and liquefied petroleum gas (LPG), serving northern and central Italy, and also the Villafortuna oil field. It is also home to the Croce di Maltocraft brewery.

It is served by Trecate railway station.

Among its churches are:

- Santa Maria Assunta - main parish church
- San Francesco - Contains frescoes by il Cerano
- Sanctuary of the Madonna delle Grazie
- Oratory del Gonfalone

== Castle of Trecate ==
The town of Trecate used to have a castle within its territory, this castle was similar to both Warkworth Castle and the Castle of Cuasso al Monte (also disappeared), in Cinque Vette Park.

== Twin towns — sister cities ==
Trecate is twinned with:

- Saint-Paul-Trois-Châteaux, France (2003)
