= Villa Tizzoni Ottolini =

Coordinates: 45°32′30.9″N 9°18′44.7″E

Villa Tizzoni-Ottolini
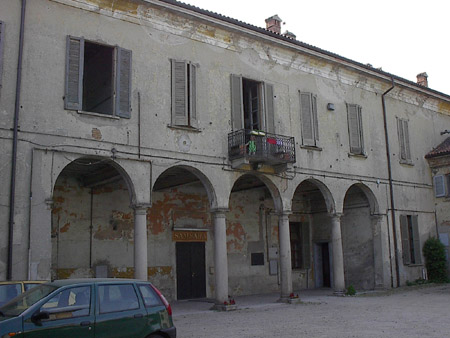
- Interactive map of the Villa Tizzoni-Ottolini area

General information
- Location: Via Increa 70, Brugherio, Italy
- Current tenants: private

Villa Tizzoni Ottolini is located in the architectural complex of Cascina Increa, in southeast Brugherio, Italy.

== History ==
The buildings in Cascina Increa are considerably, and until a few decades ago consisted of a mansion and adjacent buildings for agricultural use. The lodgings of the farmers, stables, barns and warehouses have consequently been transformed into residential buildings. There was also a park and an Italian garden, which have hence disappeared.

The Villa was used as a holiday resort for the Tizzoni, Ottolini and Robbiani Milanese families.

== Architecture ==
Villa Tizzoni Ottolini is built in the architectural style of the eighteenth century. The building has a portico with five arches topped by a wrought iron balcony and two service wings that are slightly lower. The central hall on the ground floor is dominated by a coffered ceiling. The patio leads to a staircase with a balustrade. In 1992, fragments of two eighteenth-century frescoes were found in the central room on the first floor of the villa. They are white and blue: one representing an angel in the clouds with a burning torch in his hand, the other showing a mythological scene with a warrior, three women and a winged cherub with a crown in hand. There is also a visible sky fresco depicting Mercury. To the left of the Villa entrance one can find the Church of Santa Maria Immacolata which itself possesses two frescoes: the Nativity and the agony of Saint Joseph.

== Bibliography ==
- Mancini, Manuela (1996). BRUGHERIO Presente e Passato (in Italian). Milano: Swan Edizioni.
- Ville in Brugherio - Calendario 2006 (in Italian). Brugherio: Cooperativa Agricola di Consumo.
