= Cassina Baraggia =

Baraggia Cassina Baraggia
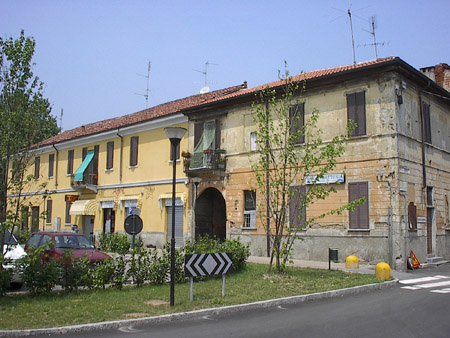
- Etymology: Baragia
- Interactive map of Baraggia
- Coordinates: 45°33′30″N 9°18′28″E
- Country: Italy
- Region: Lombardy
- Province: Monza and Brianza
- Comune: Brugherio
- Demonym: Baraggini
- 20861: 039
- Website: Official website

Cassina Baraggia is a hamlet of Brugherio's municipality, which until 1866 was a separate municipality.

== History ==
=== Origins ===
==== Etymology ====
The name Baraggia comes from the word baragia, meaning "little fertile land" or "uncultivated" land. Cassina, however, comes from the Latin castrum meaning "camp", indicating a farmhouse which was inhabited by more than one family. In the Roman imperial period, the uncultivated lands were part of a mutual fund, with open grazing, which extended to the whole territory of Brugherio. With the arrival of the Lombards the land began to be cultivated and inhabited by private owners.

==== First documented sources ====
Baragia's name appears for the first time in 769 when Grato, Roman inhabitant of Monza, set free one of his servants and gave him a land in the village de Barazia. The name can also be found documented in 853, during the donation of certain assets to the monastery of Saint Ambrose of Milan by two Romans. That same document shows that there was a chapel of Saints Cosmas and Damian (now Saint Anne Church) in the area, in turn dependent on the monastery of Saint Ambrose. The building is now located in the hamlet of San Damiano (which did not exist as such at the time). During the 12th century the Milanese territory was divided into counties and parishes. In the parish of Vimercate, Brugherium and Sanctus Damianus de Baraza, were under Martesana's county.

=== Between 15th century and 17th century ===
Gian Galeazzo Maria Sforza, Duke of Milan, appointed as feudal lords of Vimercate the family Secco Borella in 1475. In 1554 Ludovico Maria Sforza gave the land of Vimercate to Count Ludovico Secchi. The last feudal lord was Luigi Trotti, son of Count Trotti (Senator Johannes Baptista) and Maria Giulia "Seccoborella". On June 15, 1578, with the pastoral visit of Archbishop Charles Borromeo, the property was incorporated into the parish of Saint Bartholomew. The next day, the archbishop visited the chapel of Saint Margaret, itself annexed to the house of Giovanni Battista Bernareggi (today called Villa Brivio) in Baraggia. In 1594 the Inhabitants of Baraggia numbered about a hundred. In 1621, the year of the pastoral visit of Federigo Borromeo to the church of Saint Bartholomew, Baraggia numbered 96 inhabitants.

=== Between 18th century and 1866 ===
In 1721 and in 1751 land registry maps of the territory were realized by Charles VI and his daughter, Maria Theresa. The map of 1721 (updated in 1751) shows Cassina Baraggia and Cassina Brugherio Saint Ambrose as being together, even though they were distinct communities, part of the Pieve of Vimercate. In 1751 Cassina Baraggia housed 160 inhabitants: the majority of the owners were not noble, but the nobles indeed held most of land, the largest extension of which belonged to the nuns of the Convent of Santa Caterina alla Chiusa of Milan. In the town of Cassina Baraggia there were six blocks of several houses, including Villa Brivio, at the current Palazzo Ghirlanda Silva of Count Gio Batta Scotti. In the territory of Baraggia there were also two houses, including the Cascina Sant'Ambrogio with the church itself.

In addition to the cultivation of vines, from the middle of the century the cultivation of mulberry trees had spread enormously in the region, and was planted on the edge of the fields, so as not to supplant other crops. The mulberry trees were used to feed the silk worms, which were given by the owner to the tenant farmers. Mostly women and children worked on the breeding of silk worms. The explosion of silk worm translated as the construction of a textile mill in Baraggia (another being placed in Moncucco), where the first phase of production of silk (reeling) was performed.

In 1805 Cassina Baraggia counted with 516 inhabitants. In 1809, a decree of Napoleon caused the annexation of Cassina Baraggia to Carugate. With the return of the Austrians in 1816, Cassina Baraggia became autonomous. In 1853, an estimated 1,240 inhabitants populated the land, becoming 1268 in the year 1861. On December 9, 1866 the Royal Decree number 3395 was signed by Vittorio Emanuele II, leading to the town's annexation by Brugherio. Giovanni Noseda, mayor of Cassina Baraggia became the first mayor of Brugherio.

== The textile mill of Baraggia ==
The textile mill of Baraggia is a former industrial building located in Via San Francesco d'Assisi 19, Brugherio. At the beginning of '900 it was one of the four towns spinning mills, along with "Filanda Beretta" in Via Tre Re, "Filanda Santini Ronchi Spada" in via Dante and "Filanda Strazza" in Via Santa Margherita. It was called filandùn and it is currently private property, holds apartments and warehouses.

=== History ===
At the end of the eighteenth century, the site where the textile mill will be built was a countryside meadow owned by Count Giovanni Battista Durini, who held large estates in Cassina Baraggia. Less than a century later, during the Kingdom of Lombardy–Venetia, in that place there was a rectangular court, which planimetry corresponds to the one has come down to present day: almost completely closed, with a single entrance from Municipal Road that from Cassina Baraggia goes to Carugate. The spinning mill was built in the second half of the nineteenth century and it was used for the first phase of silk processing, the reeling, in which the filament was extracted from the cocoon to wrap on reels. Between 1873 and 1894, the court was completely closed: the portion facing the street was elevated and, to the east of the building, it was built a group of houses intended for laborers employed in the factory. In the second half of the twentieth century, Baraggia underwent a slow decline. The Marquis Brivio, owners of most of the assets and land located in the hamlet, paid scant and manufacturing, with the textile industry crisis, were gradually abandoned. Remained empty, some houses and cottages in the courtyard collapsed from neglect. At the beginning of the twenty-first century, the municipality made a recovery plan of the entire historical center of the neighborhood. In this context, even the old textile mill has been restructured: at present it is a building that has partially retained the original architecture, adapted to new functions, even housing.

=== Architecture ===
The building plan is a rectangular closed courtyard, delimited by buildings of two and three floors, which are the result of the restoration of the twenty-first century. Ancient mill remains internal to the court building, originally a double-height floor, partly renovated to form two plans for houses. The supporting structures are in brick tile, the main body is on round arches pillars, partly buffered. The floors are generally of masonry, the cover is in wooden trusses with a gable roof and a mantle of brick tiles. The building has decorations, such as external ornaments.

== Bibliography ==
- Tribuzio Zotti, Luciana (1986). Brugherio nei documenti (in Italian). Brugherio: Musicografica Lombarda.
- Tribuzio Zotti, Luciana (1987). Brugherio: luoghi memorabili (in Italian). Brugherio: Parole Nuove.
- Brugherio: la nostra gente (in Italian). Brugherio: Movimento Terza Età. 1992.
- Mancini, Manuela (1996). Brugherio: presente e passato (in Italian). Milano: Swan.
- Tribuzio Zotti, Luciana; Magni, Giuseppe (2012). Una città nel segno dei Magi: Brugherio 1613-2013 (in Italian). Brugherio: Associazione Kairos.
