= Monuments of Brugherio =

Set of sculptures in Brugherio, Italy

Monuments of Brugherio are three sculptures dedicated respectively to the Fallen during the First World War, to the Blood Donors and to Peace, which are at different points of the city center of Brugherio, is a municipality in the Italian region of Lombardy.

== World War Memorial ==
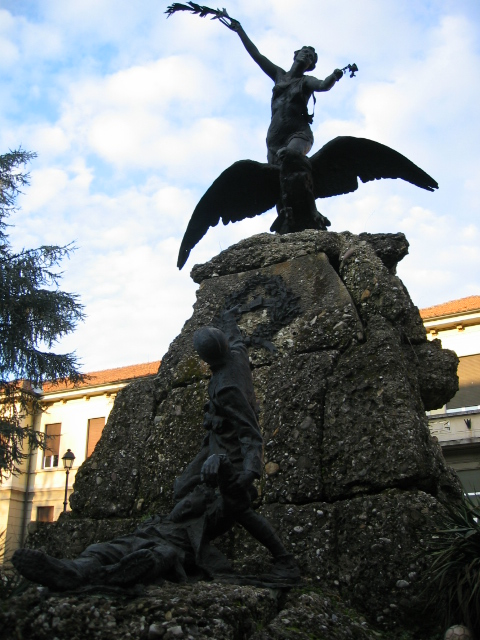
World War Memorial.

The War Memorial (45°33′13″N 9°17′55″E) is a sculpture in bronze and stone, built in 1933 by Ernesto Bazzaro, which is located in Via Vittorio Veneto, in front of the primary school "Federico Sciviero". It commemorates the soldiers of Brugherio who died in the First World War. It is characterized by a dramatic tension, determined by the dichotomy between the complex gesture of the two soldiers, at the base of the rock, and the Victory leaning against an eagle.

== Monument to blood donors ==
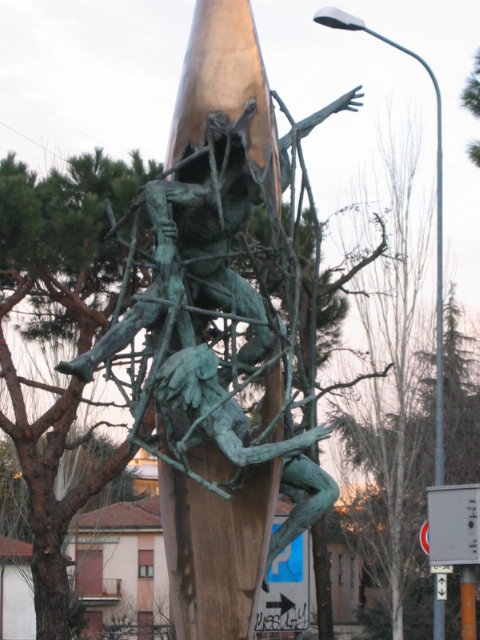
Monument to blood donors.

The monument to blood donors (45°33′06″N 9°17′52″E) was inaugurated on 4 June 1978 to celebrate the twentieth anniversary of the founding of the Brugherio's association of blood donors, AVIS (Associazione Volontari Italiani del Sangue). The monument is located in Via Galvani, also known as Blood Donor street, and is the work of artist Max Squillace. The sculpture measures four meters in height, two in width and one in depth. It is made of bronze and it represent the life that flows from a drop of blood, symbolizing the theme of solidarity. At the base of the monument there is written the phrase "Dopo non voltarti, gli occhi di chi ha bisogno ti troveranno ovunque" ("do not turn away, the eyes of those in need will find you everywhere").

== Monument to Peace ==
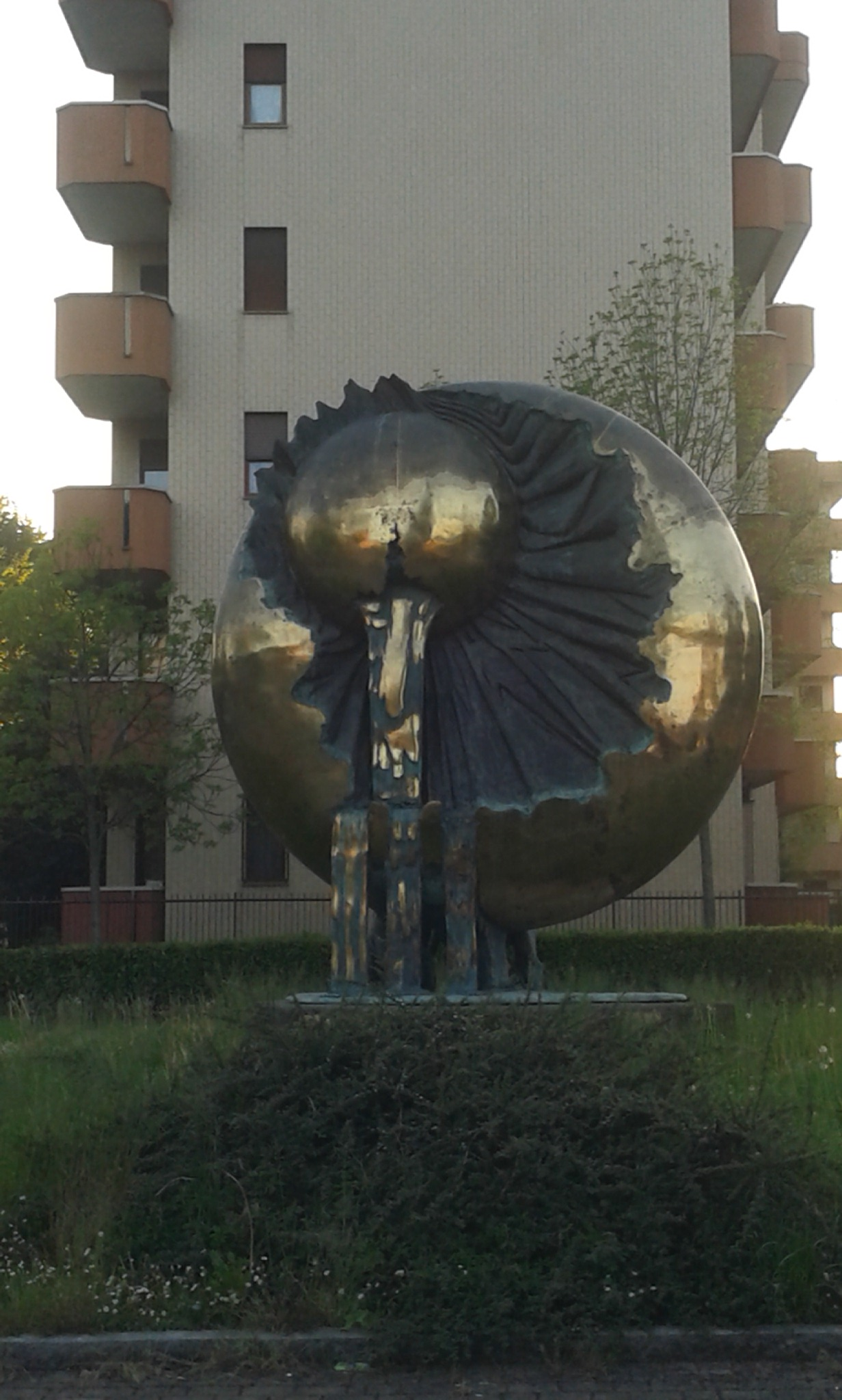
Monument to Peace.

The Monument to Peace (45°33′15″N 9°18′10″E) is a sculpture located in Piazza Giovanni XXIII in Brugherio. It was designed by Max Squillace and was commission by the municipal administration, who proclaimed Brugherio "City of Peace" in 2003. The sculpture is entitled The spirit of a calm place. The inauguration, on 23 November 2003, was dedicated to all those who have lost their life on a mission of peace. Following the 2003 Nasiriyah bombing, the monument was further dedicated to the police officers who lost their lives in that attack. Following the placement of the monument there was some dispute over the location as some citizens felt that due to the importance of the work it deserved a larger space. The monument is in fact very large (four meters high, four and a half wide and one deep) and looks like a huge sphere that depicts the universe dominated by the planets. In the center of the universe, a sun that gives birth to life. From it flows a water source. A tree's roots pass through the water and set into the ground, with branches ascending to heaven. The work was constructed in bronze with the lost wax technique.

== Bibliography ==
- Manuela Mancini (1996). Brugherio: presente e passato (in Italian). Milano: Swan.
- Brugherio: i suoi luoghi, la sua storia: 225. anniversario del primo volo italiano in mongolfiera con uomini a bordo (in Italian). Brugherio: Comune di Brugherio. 2009.
- Claudio Pollastri (2010). Gocce di vite donate : 1958-2010 Avis Comunale di Brugherio (in Italian).
