= Plague crosses (Brugherio) =

Coordinates: 45°33′0.87″N 9°17′0.02″E

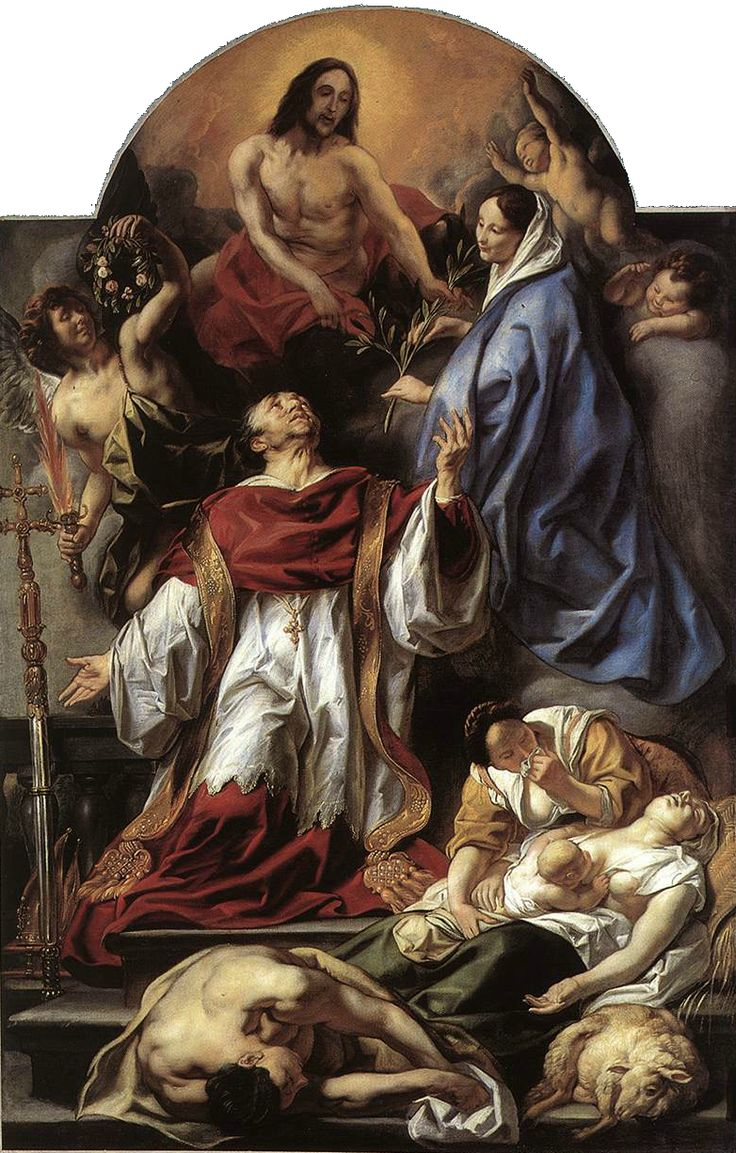
St. Charles and the plague

There are three plague crosses in Brugherio, in the province of Monza and Brianza in Lombardy, in northern Italy. They were erected after the plague that struck Monza and its surrounding area in 1576. The crosses are three that remain of four that marked where there were four altars used to celebrate religious services during the plague. The plague of 1576 was in fact called "the plague of Saint Charles", given the Bishop's closeness to those affected. Information about the plague can be found in the Bishop of Milan, Saint Charles Borromeo's notes.

== Background – Saint Charles's plague ==
The plague that struck Milan and other nearby towns in Lombardy during 1575–1576 is now known as "the plague of Saint Charles". It was so named by Alessandro Manzoni in The Betrothed, to distinguish it from the plague of 1630, which is described in the novel. The plague probably came from the Turks living in Hungary and from there, through trade with Germany, it spread along the Danube, Switzerland, Trento, and down to Verona and Venice. The epidemic reached Melegnano 27 July 1576, on August 4 hit Monza and then Milan.

In less than two months 6,000 people had died. The Archbishop of Milan Charles Borromeo, unlike the civil authorities and notables, did not abandon the city. The Archbishop closed all the churches and he built altars outside them, to give the opportunity to the faithful to attend mass even from their homes. He introduced the "Practice of forty hours" that consisted of the adoration of the Blessed Sacrament that was exposed in the entrance for forty hours outside. He asked for volunteers to help the population. Borromeo donated a lot of his clothes and church tapestries to the people in need and he organized processions to console the people infected. One of these processions, on 6 October 1576, is called "procession of the Holy Nail" because it featured a nail said to be from Jesus's Cross.

The Archbishop lived only a few years longer, and, when he died on 2 November 1584, he was declared locally to be a Saint. This decision was ratified by Pope Paul V who recognised him as a saint in 1610 with a feast day of November 4. As a result, his name was given to the plague that he had helped to mitigate. It turned out that this was the middle of three plagues. The earlier plague of 1524 was called the "plague of Charles V", this plague of 1576 was called the "Plague of St Charles" and the later longer 1629–31 plague was called the "plague of Manzoni".

== Plague crosses ==
During the spread of the plague, the faithful gathered in prayer around outdoor altars to avoid contagion to which they were exposed indoors. At the end of the plague the altars were dismantled but, in gratitude, these plague crosses were erected by survivors in their place. The remaining crosses are in the Piazza Roma, next to the Church of Saint Bartholomew; in Viale Lombardia, not far from the old cemetery and in Torazza. The cross in San Damiano is now lost. At the top of all these monuments there is the symbol of the cross, supported by architectural details including spheres, cones, and capitals. In some cases the pillars contain, often illegible, inscriptions.

=== Plague cross in Piazza Roma ===
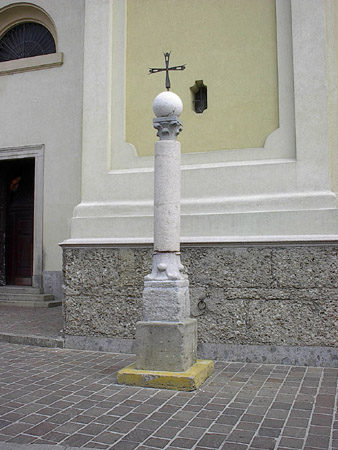
Plague cross in Piazza Roma

This plague cross is located next to the parish church. There is an inscription on the ball at the top which says: In Hoc Signo Vinces, the capital Deo Sacrum Christ Jesus, and on its base: Sicut Moses esaltavi Serpentem in Desert sic. On the stone block which forms the pedestal: Spes omnium Salus Fidellium Branda Scottus fecit proud. Anno Nativitatis MDLXX Maj I. The inscription of the year is likely incomplete because the column was built by Bernard Scotti in 1576. It is also known as Cross Scotti.

=== Plague cross in Viale Lombardia ===
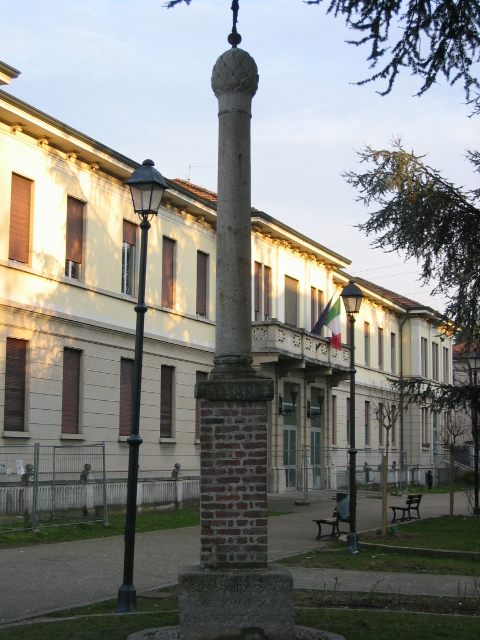
Plague cross in Viale Lombardia

This pillar is on Viale Lombardia, before the old cemetery. This cross is characterized by a cone near the top. Bernard Scotti's name, is written on it. He worked for the community and he built this plague cross in 1578. For years this inscription was not very visible because it was embedded in the wall of the building and hidden by vegetation. In recent times the pillar has been moved across the street. The following inscription can be read on the pedestal of the column: Sicut Mojses exaltavit Serpentem in Desert. There is another inscription on a square stone at the base: Ego sum lux et veritas Mundi via vivorum life. On the western side of the pedestal it says: Sic Deus dilexit Mundum ut suum Filium unigenitum daret pro nobis. On the eastern side: Ecce nomen super omne nomen et omne and genuflectatur and on the northern side: Hic quem videtis true solus Dominus Noster est et our glory. Branda Scotus fecit. This monument is also known as Brugherio Cross, or House Scotti.

=== Plague cross in Torazza ===
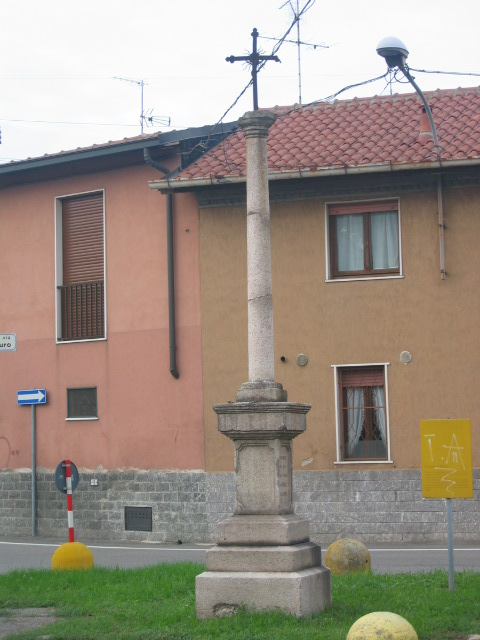
Plague cross in Torazza

This Plague cross is placed at Torrazza's crossroads. Translated to English, the pedestal shows the following: "Votive monument in memory of the 1576 plague, torn down by a cyclone in 1928, rebuilt in 1929 by Angelo Cazzaniga's family".

=== Pillar in San Damiano ===
There is no trace of this column in local historical chronicles.

== Bibliography ==
- Serviliano Latuada (1738). Descrizione di Milano (in Italian). Milano.
- Zardin, Danilo (1984). San Carlo (in Italian). Milano: Jaca Book.
- Tribuzio Zotti, Luciana (1986). Brugherio nei documenti (in Italian). Brugherio: Musicografica Lombarda.
- Tribuzio Zotti, Luciana (1987). Brugherio: luoghi memorabili (in Italian). Brugherio: Parole Nuove.
- Mancini, Manuela (1996). Brugherio: presente e passato (in Italian). Milano: Swan.
- Portaluppi, Geo (2002). La Milano dei Borromei (in Italian). Spoleto: Edizioni Selecta.
- Brugherio: i suoi luoghi, la sua storia: 225. anniversario del primo volo italiano in mongolfiera con uomini a bordo (in Italian). Brugherio: Comune di Brugherio. 2009.
- Cosmacini, Giorgio (2009). Il medico e il cardinale (in Italian). Milano: Editrice San Raffaele.
