= Plague cross =

Commemorative mark or monument to plague victims

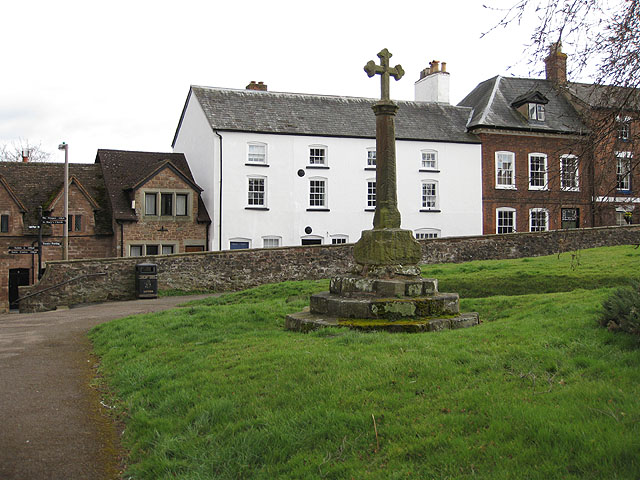
The Plague Cross at Ross-on-Wye, Herefordshire, England, close to the site of a mass burial of plague victims

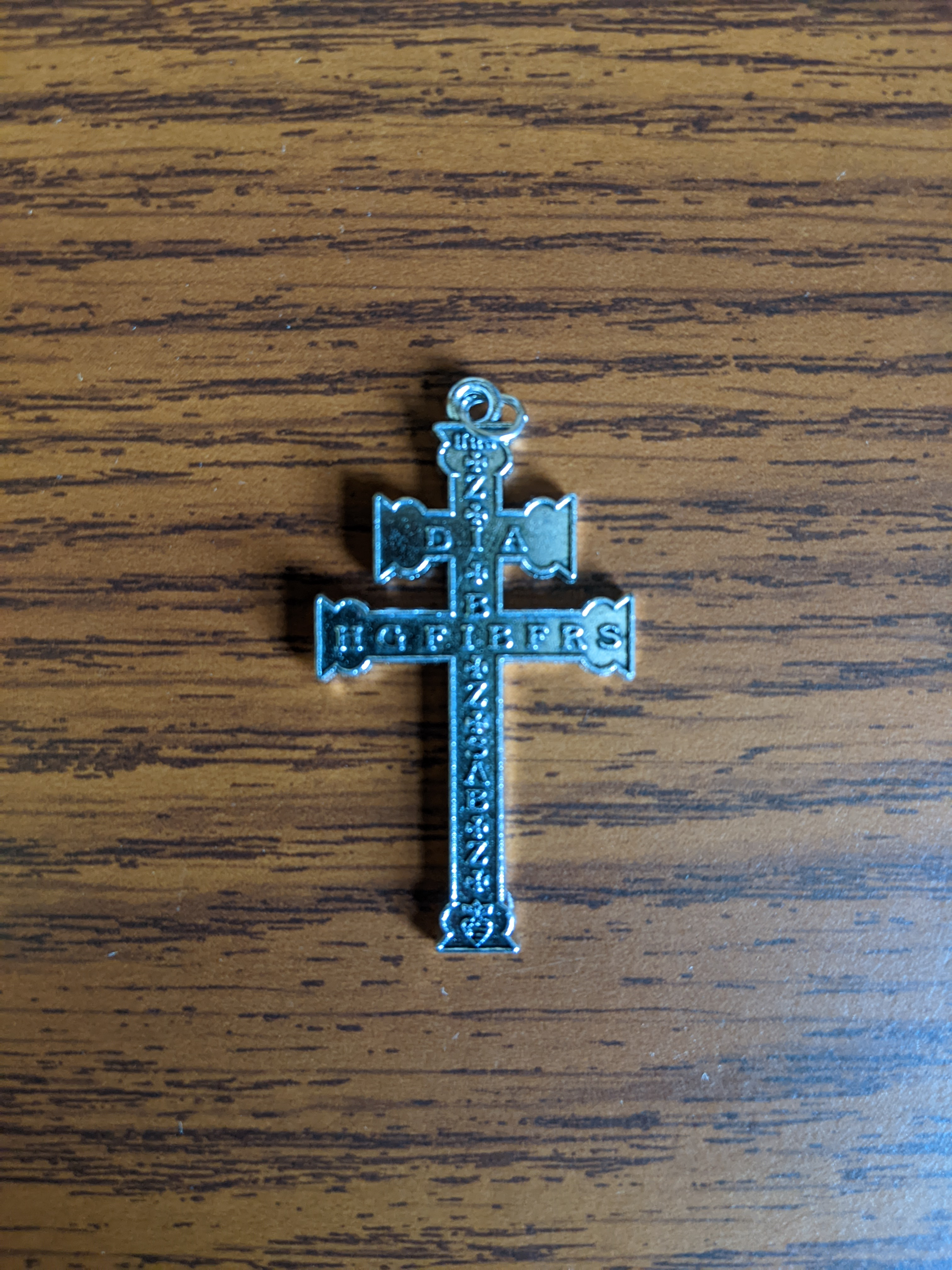
A Plague Cross sacramental, worn as a cross necklace to offer protection during plagues

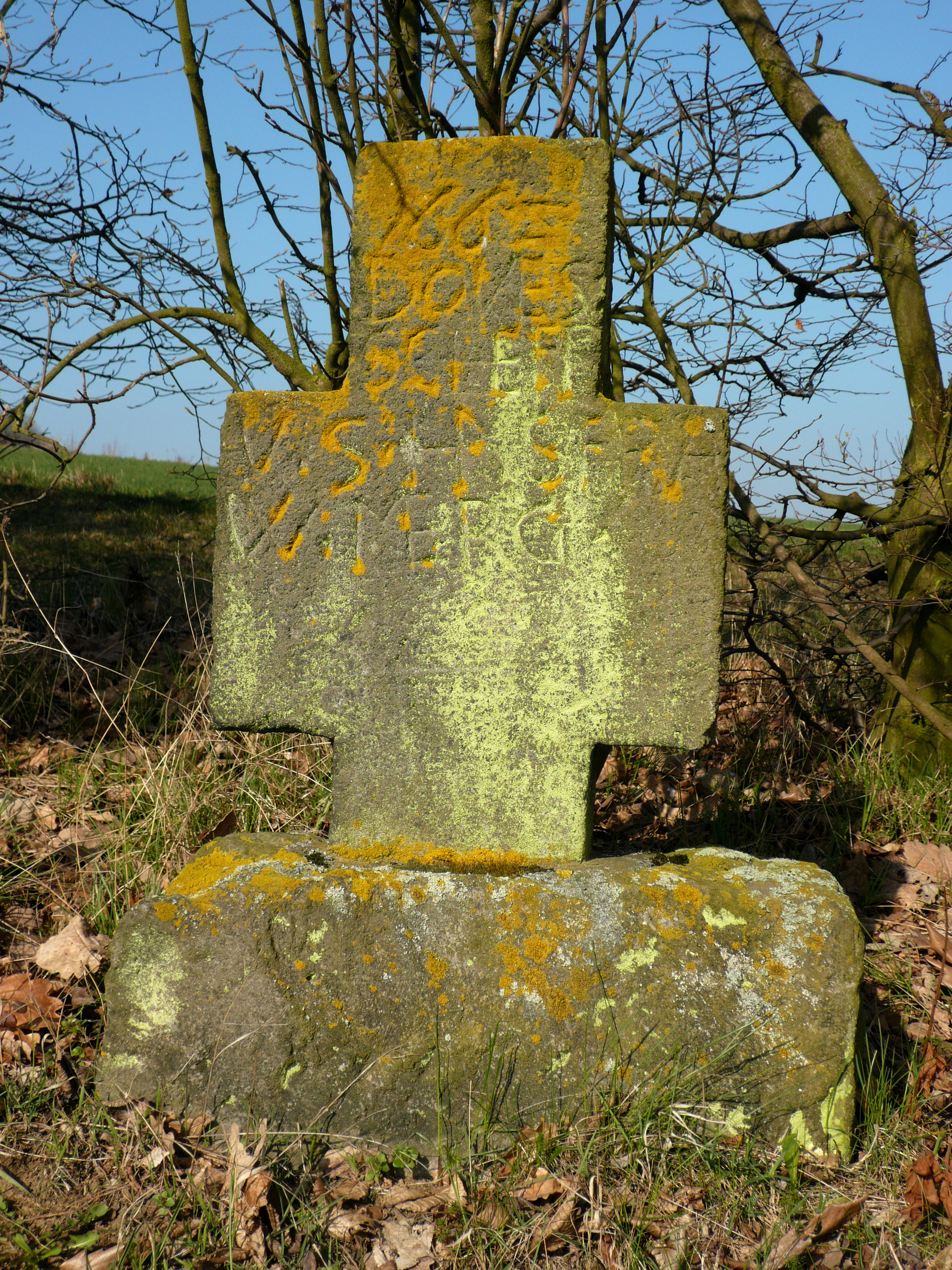
Commemorative Pestkreuz dated 1665, near Schalkenbach, Germany

The term plague cross can refer to either a mark placed on a building occupied by victims of plague; or a permanent structure erected, to enable plague sufferers to trade while minimising the risk of contagion. A wide variety of plague cross existed in Britain and elsewhere in Europe, until the plague largely disappeared by the eighteenth century. Additionally, the term "plague cross" can specifically refer to the "Plague Cross of Saint Zacharias of Jerusalem", a Western Christian sacramental invoking God's protection against diseases and plagues that often takes the form of a cross necklace or a wall cross.

== Plague notices ==
At times of plague, it was common to mark the doors of victims of the disease with a large painted cross, either in red or black paint. In later times, large printed crosses were often affixed to doors. Daniel Defoe reported, at the time of the Great Plague in 1665, that the Lord Mayor of London, in his regulations, stated:

"That every house visited [by the disease] be marked with a red cross of a foot long in the middle of the door, evident to be seen, and with these usual printed words, that is to say, "Lord, have mercy upon us," to be set close over the same cross, there to continue until lawful opening of the same house."

About the same time, Samuel Pepys wrote on 7 June 1665:

"I did in Drury-lane see two or three houses marked with a red cross upon the doors, and "Lord have mercy upon us" writ there - which was a sad sight to me, being the first of that kind that to my remembrance I ever saw."

== Market structures and "vinegar stones" ==
In some locations, stone structures were set up outside established market areas, as temporary market crosses denoting places where town and country dwellers could trade with one another while supposedly minimising the risk of contagion. For example, at Macclesfield in Cheshire in 1603 and 1646, Greenway Cross was "used as a 'plague cross,' to which country people came to sell their provisions to the dwellers in the town."

At York, stone crosses were erected during an outbreak of plague in 1604, on main roads about one mile outside the city, to denote temporary locations where trading could take place. There, each cross held a small pool of water into which money was placed and from which it could be removed in trading. In Derby in 1665, a headless cross or "vinegar stone" was erected, in which the water was replaced by vinegar as a disinfectant. The "vinegar stone" at Wentworth in Yorkshire is supposed to have a similar origin.

In Germany, stone crosses or Pestkreuze were also set up in some locations to commemorate those who died from plague. Memorial crosses to individual plague victims were also set up at churches, as at Trittenheim.

=== Examples ===
- Brugherio, Italy: Three plague crosses in Piazza Roma, Viale Lombardia, and Torazza.
- Ross-on-Wye, UK: the churchyard contains a Plague Cross or "Corpse Cross", commemorating 315 local residents who died in a 1637 plague outbreak and buried in mass graves.

== Plague columns ==
Plague columns, also known as Marian or Holy Trinity columns, are found throughout Europe, and frequently as thanksgiving for the ending of a plague. Examples include:

- Košice, Slovakia:Plague Pillar

== Gallery ==
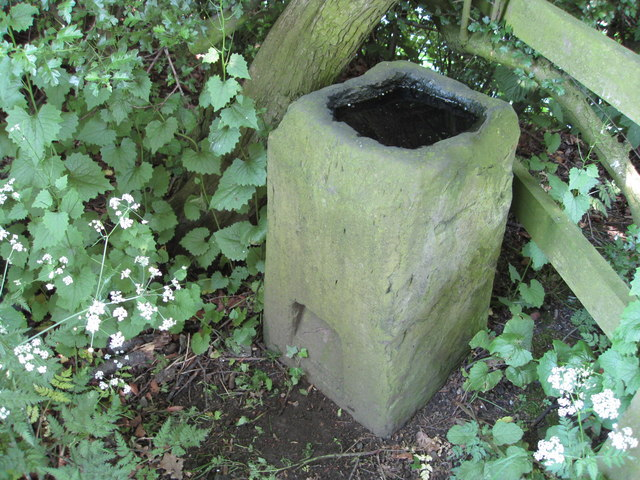
A "vinegar stone", at Wentworth, Yorkshire

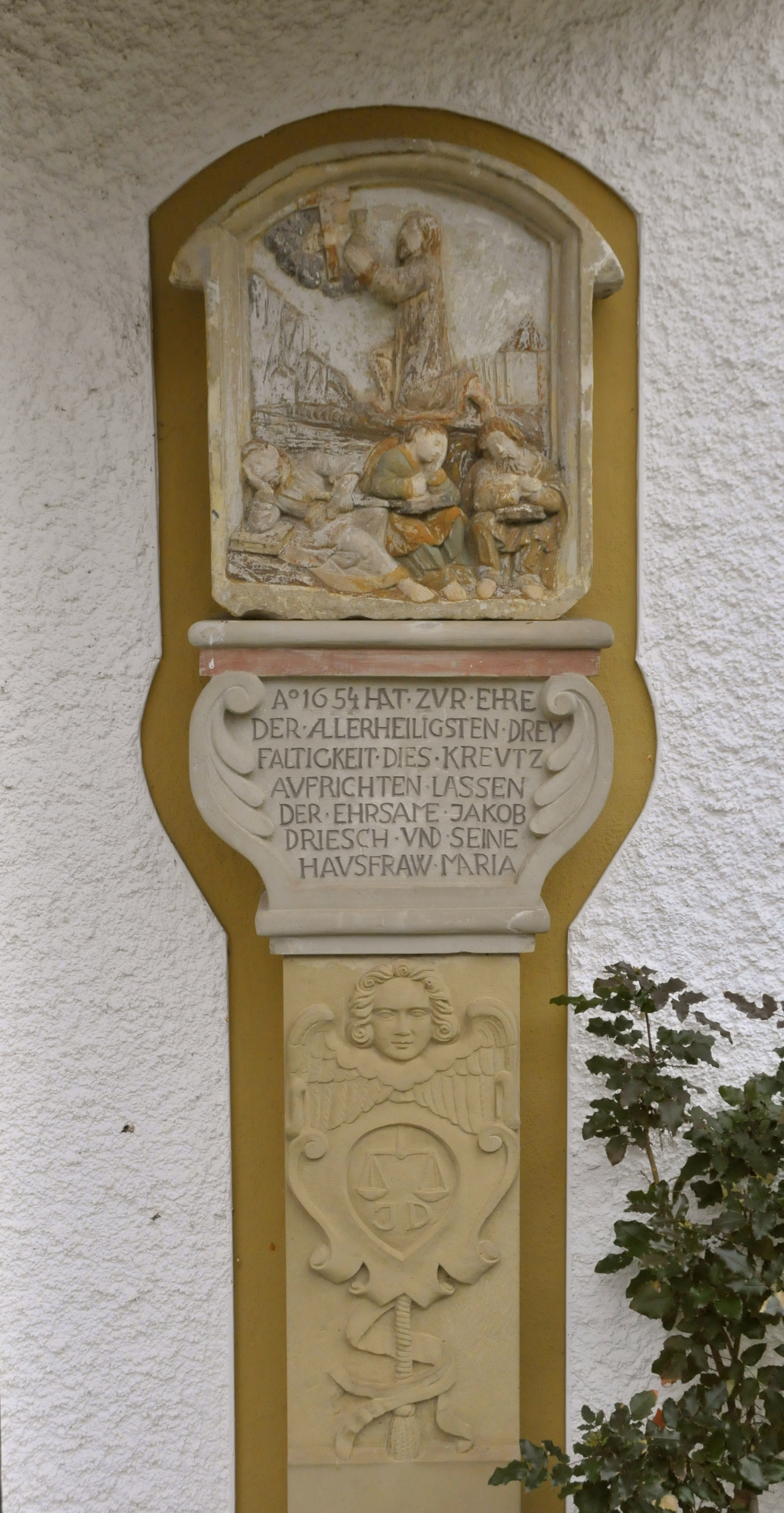
Memorial cross to plague victims at Trittenheim, Germany

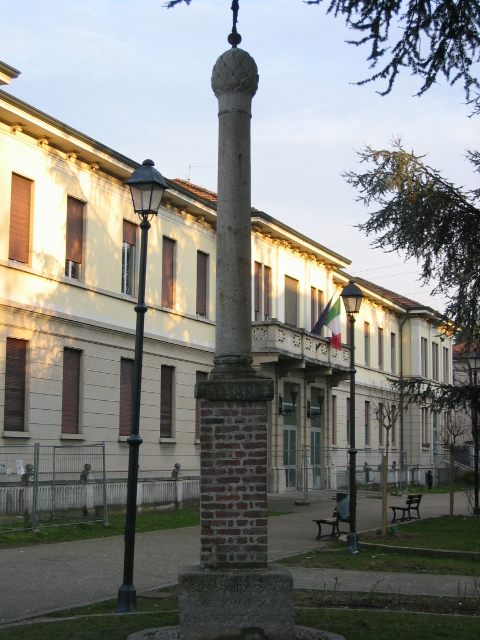
One of the plague crosses in Brugherio, Italy, which record where there were open air altars in 1576

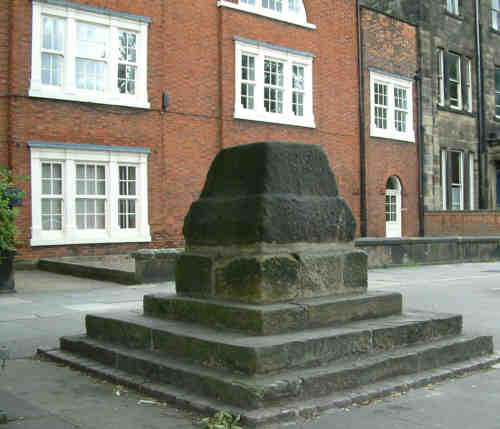
The Plague Stone or Vinegar Stone at Friargate, Derby, England

== See also ==
- Fourteen Holy Helpers
