= San Damiano, Brugherio =

San Damiano
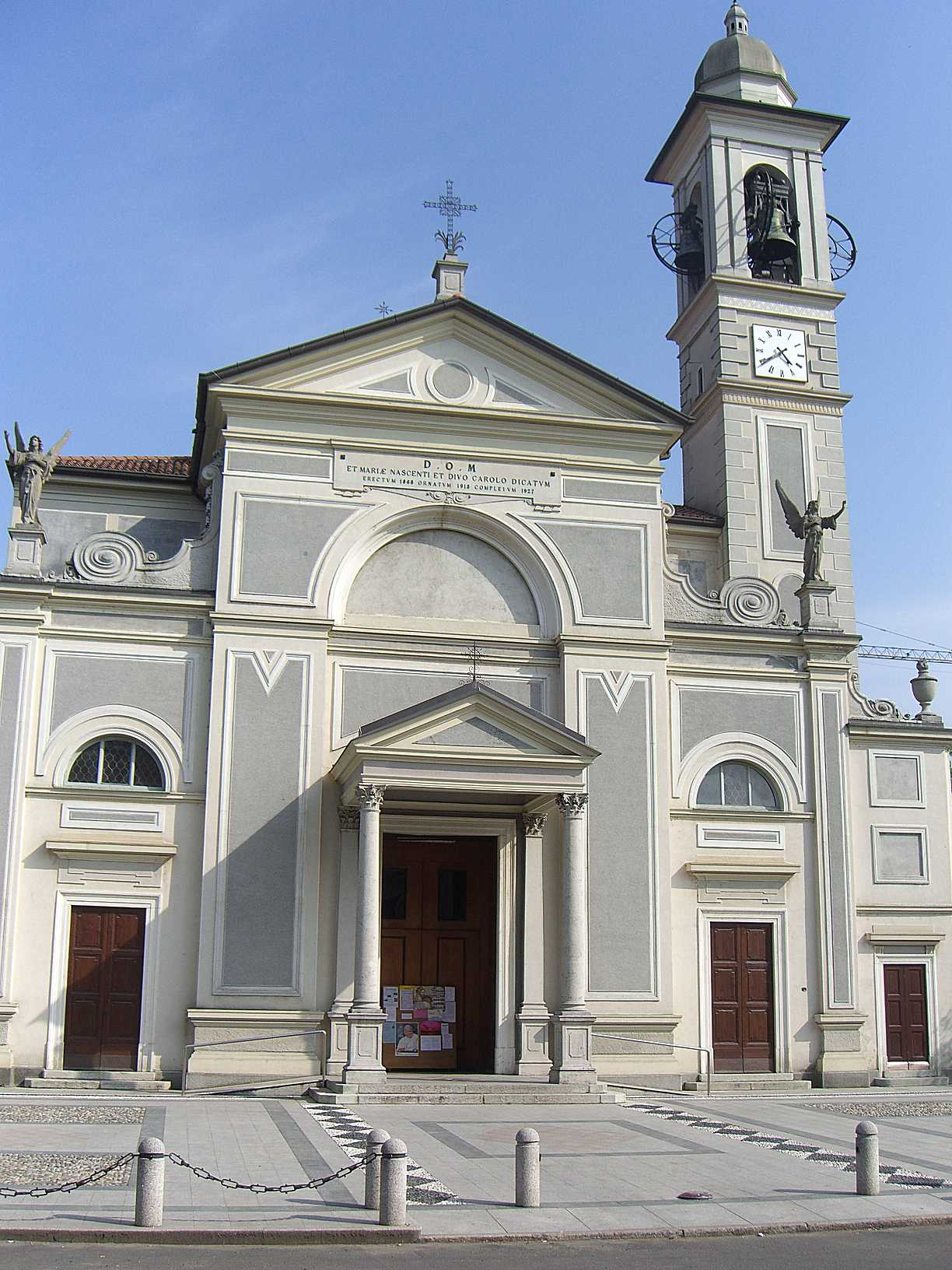
- Church of Santa Maria Nascente and Saint Charles
- Interactive map of San Damiano
- Coordinates: 45°34′5″N 9°18′14″E
- Country: Italy
- Region: Lombardy
- Province: Monza and Brianza
- Municipality: Brugherio

Population
  - Total: 5,000
- Demonym: Sandamianesi
- 20861: 039
- Website: Official website

San Damiano is a hamlet in far north Brugherio, Italy. It is located between the Milan-Bergamo highway and the eastern road ring of Monza. It is 1.46 kilometres (0.91 mi) away from the town center.

== History ==
During the Carolingian period San Damiano was a village built around a monastery under the supervision of Saint Ambrose of Milan. In a document dating to the year 853, San Damiano housed a church dedicated to Saints Cosmas and Damian. During the Middle Ages the town did not host any important events. By the 14th century, the town still existed. In the 16th century a local parish was built by Saint Charles Borromeo, alas San Damiano did not join the parish given its population would be forced to pay a fee for the parish priest's allowance. San Damiano remained in the parish of San Gerardo in Monza. By 1751 it was a separate municipality with 75 inhabitants administered by a consul elected by the population. In 1805, with the proclamation of the napoleonic Kingdom of Italy the number of residents was 178. In 1809, the town was under the control of Napoleon and its jurisdiction was merged with Monucco's, then together merging with the one of Monza in 1811. On 12 February 1816 the Austrians re-established it as an independent municipality and it remained so for 50 years. In 1853 San Damiano had 363 inhabitants. In 1863 it was renamed San Damiano of Monza but in 1866 the commune was annexed definitively to the new town of Brugherio after a strong debate. The mayor of Baraggia (future mayor of Brugherio) convinced the citizens of San Damiano to merge with the new municipality.

== Religious life ==
San Damiano is under the control of Sant'Albino's parish that is from the administrative point of view under Monza's supervision, but from the perspective of the religious community under the pastoral Epiphany of the Lord in Brugherio. The Church of Saint Anne can be found on the village's land.

== Education ==
In San Damiano there are three schools that are part of the Istituto Comprensivo Via Nazario Sauro: Fratelli Grimm kindergarten, Corridoni primary school and Eduardo De Filippo secondary school.

== Culture and Sports ==
In San Damiano, some holidays are celebrated: one in June that is organised by the Department for Cultural Heritage of Brugherio and takes place in a neighborhood north of the city; and another in November. The town's local musical band was formed in 1906, and still is involved in several local events. In addition, the A.S. società sportiva San Damiano-Sant'Albino, whose colors are white and amaranth, is found in this town.
