= San Carlo, Brugherio =

Religious building in Brugherio

San Carlo Saint Charles
- Chiesa di San Carlo
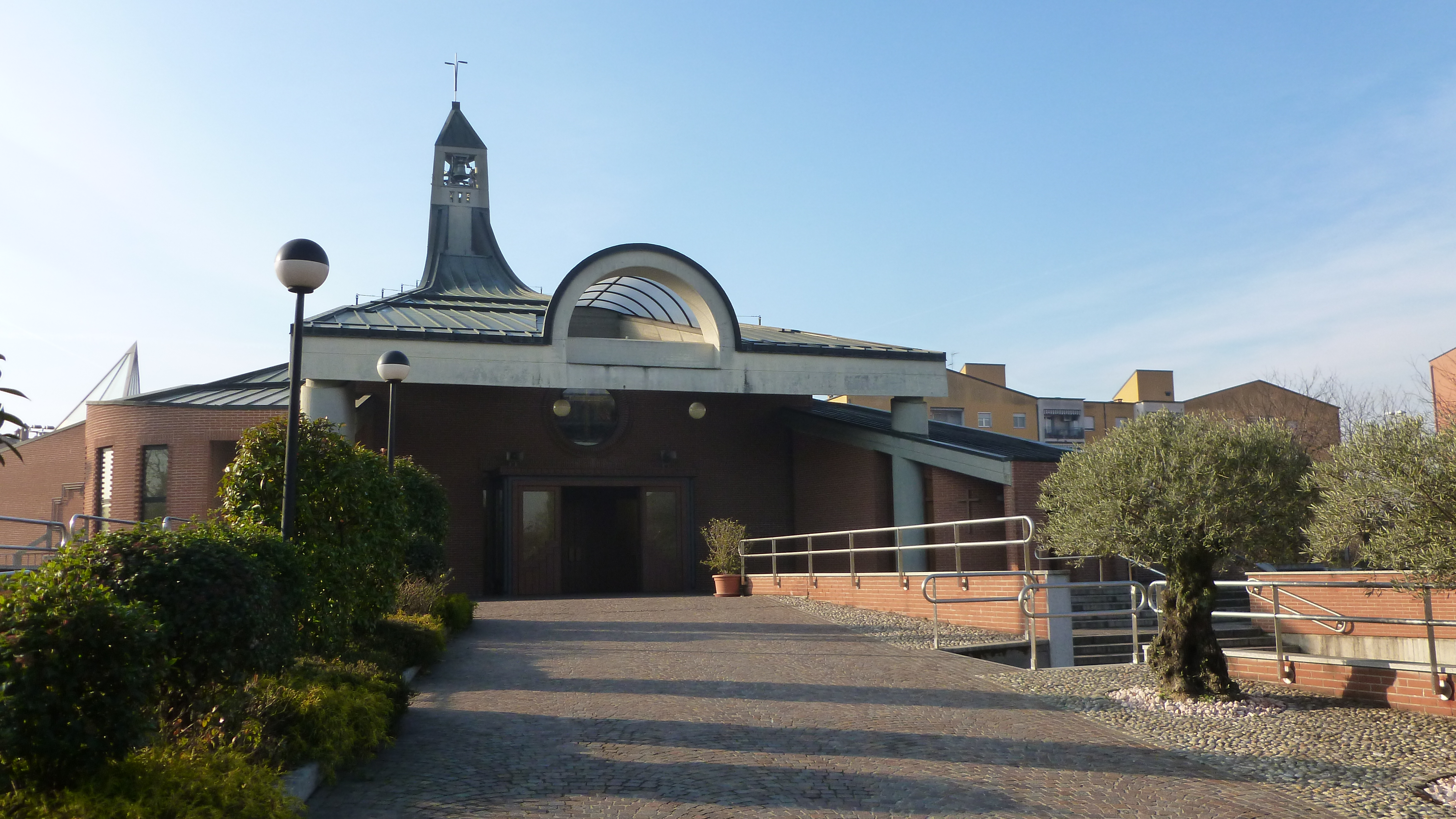
- Exterior view of the church

Religion
- Affiliation: Roman Catholic
- Province: Monza and Brianza
- Region: Lombardy
- Patron: Saint Charles
- Year consecrated: 27 April 1996
- Status: Church

Location
- Municipality: Brugherio
- State: Italy
- Interactive map of San Carlo; Saint Charles
- Coordinates: 45.55036°N 9.28389°E

Architecture
- Completed: 1993

San Carlo ("Saint Charles") is a church located in Via Piergiorgio Frassati, in the west of Brugherio and it is part of the pastoral community Epiphany of the Lord.

== History ==
The desire for a new church for the parish of Saint Bartholomew in Brugherio was already in the mind of Don Franco Perlatti since 1969 when, in a letter to Cardinal Giovanni Colombo about the construction of Saint Paul's Church, also alluded to the necessity, the near future, of another church in the west of the city in the rapid expansion process. In 1982, with Christmas greetings, parishioners expressed a willingness to start collecting money for the new church's construction. The land that Don Franco had reserved for the construction of the Saint Charles parish was one of the many territory given by Cazzaniga family to the parish of Saint Bartholomew in Brugherio, specifically it was Mrs. Paola Viganò's possession, called also widow Cazzaniga. The surface, characterized by the amplitude of 10 thousand square meters, has allowed the architects to design, in addition to the church, also the parsonage and classrooms for catechism, reserving a discreet space for games and outdoor pools, both indoors. In 1987 it was rented a room, made available by the municipality of Brugherio, under the arcades of Piazza Togliatti buildings and began to celebrate Mass and to organize some festive gathering events. For the design, the implementation and the financing of the entire work, Don Franco did not want to burden the "Cardinal Montini Plan" about the construction of twenty-five new churches on the territory of the Diocese Ambrosiana, but relied on the generosity of its parishioners. The constant search for funds gave rise to a series of initiatives including the distribution of envelopes for collection of offers in the occasion of Christmas 1988 bearing the plastic image of the new church and the lottery of 1991 with formalized tickets by Intendenza di finanza. Don Franco took an inflexible position with the technical department of the Curia, which proposed as designers some of its technicians. He wanted that the design of the parish was decided by professionals of Brugherio, known since the time of the oratory for their honesty and professionalism. He chose architects Alberto Brivio architects, Ferdinand Caprotti and Carlo Magni and engineer Giuseppe Gatti. Technical members of the team were also the surveyor Claro Sardi, manufacturer, and the surveyor Edward Teruzzi, technical manager and mayor of the City of Brugherio. All these professionals offered their services free of charge. The contract for construction was entrusted to the company Gemini & Noventa di Milano. Construction manager was the architect Alberto Brivio. With the archbishop's decree of February 1, 1993, Father Mario Ferrario was appointed parish priest of Saint Charles Church, which was careful for the first ten years. The church was consecrated by Cardinal Carlo Maria Martini, Archbishop of Milan on April 27, 1996. Don Daniele Turconi (former pastor for twenty years in Cinisello and then chaplain of the prisons in Monza), happened to Don Mario on November 1, 2002. From late 1994 to 2011 the parish was assisted by Fr Paolo Grima, Brugherio's native priest who has much cultivated personal relationships by listening to the people, especially the sick and suffering. Don Paolo Grima died on May 12, 2011.

== Architecture ==
The structure is characterized by an altar in the middle, towards which the architectural lines, and for the upward momentum, enhanced by beautiful wooden beams of the roof. The plant has a square shape, with main axis on the diagonal. The resulting volumes are three and ideally divide the space into three naves: a central whose sailing coverage culminating in the bell tower and two side coverage at a lower level than sailing's one. The cover consists of a large covered outside laminated wood beams from copper plates. When viewed from above, it reminds Piazza del Campo in Siena that is said that it has been inspired by the blanket that covered the Holy Virgin. Outside the church has a narthex brick split-view in two large arms to represent the embrace of God to the Church community. Inside the classroom has a single nave, this encourages participation in the celebrations of the whole assembly. The church has a capacity of about 450 people to sit and possible other 150 standing. The presbytery is wide and suitably raised from the classroom floor by four steps The curved walls that surround it, creating a continuity from the altar to the nave, between celebrant and congregation.

=== The floor ===
The floor emphasizes the connection path between the entrance and the altar. The design, created by Antonio Teruzzi, is a stylized tree. The leaves are made with mosaic technique, the trunk instead is made with pieces of marble. The tree is a thick figure of symbolic meanings: it refers to life that transcends time and space. The tree has the truck on the surface of the earth, the roots in the ground and the branches in the sky. This symbolically takes up the salvation-historical time path from the Creation to the coming of Christ, with the intent of making the entrance-altar journey as a passage from darkness to light. Teruzzi was assisted by Luigi Beretta in the collection of biblical references. Along the tree-trunk are represented the stages of the history of salvation. Each stage or day of history is marked by a stone. At the base appears a continuous line, without interruption, in dark colors and dotted with tiny bright flashes (few golden mosaic tiles). It represents the primordial chaos which preceded the Creation, when the earth was a formless void and darkness covered the abyss (in black tiles), but already the spirit (in clear tiles) hovered over the waters (Gen. . 1:29). The creation is marked by stones 7, numbered from 1 to 7 with simple marble tiles, and they are one for each day. On each of them it is represent the work of God in that day as written in Genesis. After the Creation are remembered the 10 generations Cycle from Adam to Noah and 10 generations from Noah to Abraham. Each group is made with different shades of color of the marble tiles, on which there are marked at the most salient character names from which generations are named. So we read the names of Adam, Noah, Shem, Abraham, Isaac, Jacob, Judah and then David, Solomon and finally Mary and Joseph. The generations from Adam to Jesus are linked along the axis of the shaft by a continuous sinusoidal curve, similar to a spiral. The mosaic is in reddish hues. From Jacob the branches beginning to widen: 12 branches to mark his 12 children, that, after Jacob, all become owners, heirs of the promise of a land, as descents of a Messiah.

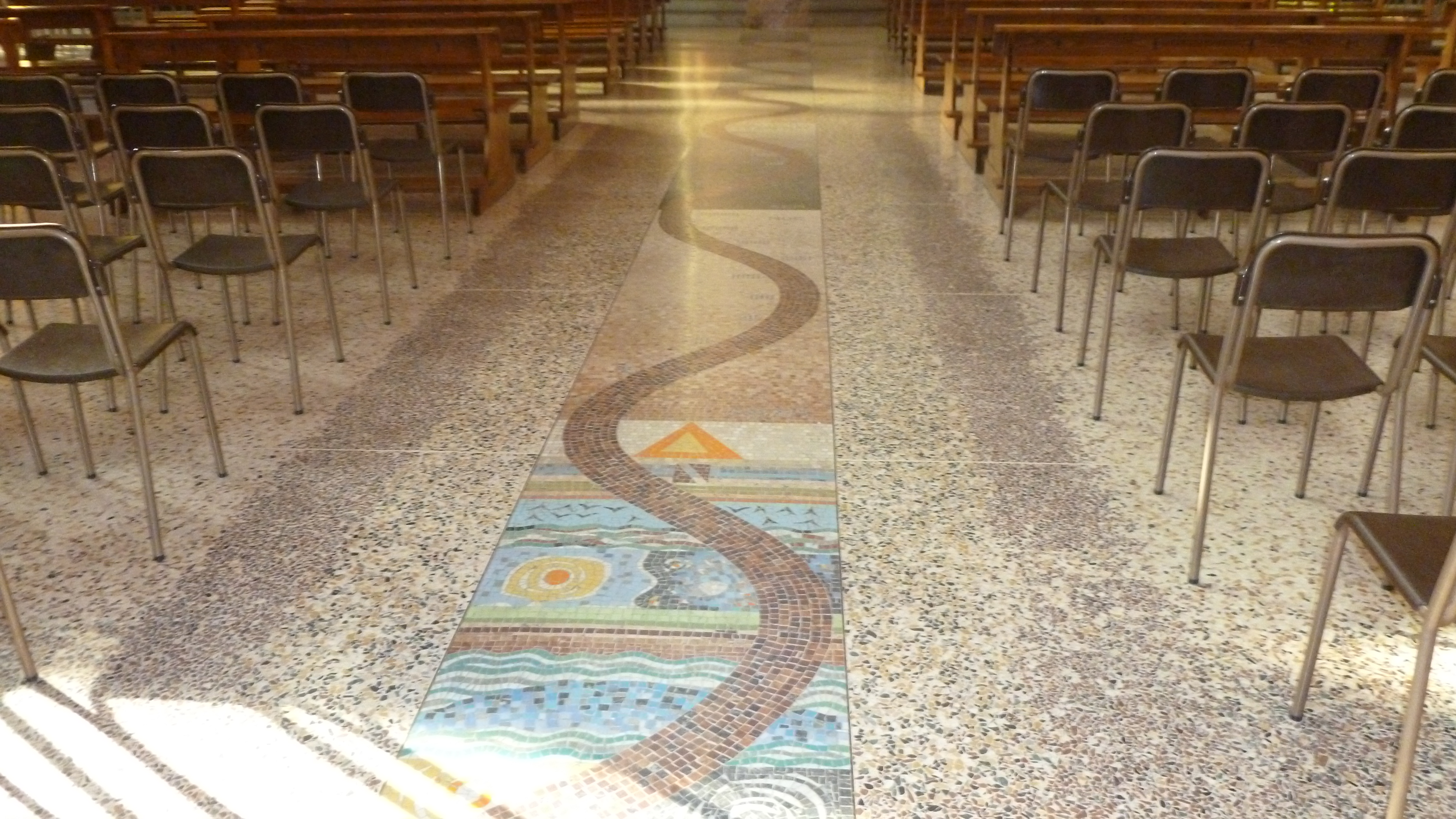
The floor of Saint Charles's Church

=== The altar ===
The altar is the center church, visible from any point by the faithfuls. An overhead light emphasizes the role. For planning purposes, it is not facing east, as they would like the Christian sacred architecture dictates. With the altar, "stone" representing Christ, the perspective of the history of salvation design, shown on the floor, switches from horizontal to vertical dimension. On the front there is a tree with 12 branches: it represent the birth of the Spirit sent by Christ and distributes to the twelve Apostles and through them, to all men the legacy of the sky. Even the glass above the altar takes up the same tree symbolism.

=== The tabernacle and the ambo ===
Both the tabernacle and the ambo are located in the presbytery. The tabernacle is inside a marble structure of Carrara white marble and red of France marble. Three equal and distinct elements enclosing the door of the tabernacle. The ambo, built with the same colored marbles, opens to the faithfuls as a great book from where it is possible to read the Word of God.

=== The baptismal font ===
The baptismal font, such as the flooring, was designed by the painter Antonio Teruzzi that defines it in this way: "The octagonal shape symbolizes the resurrection and evokes eternal life". It's on the left side of the church. The descendants steps that surround it are a sign of penance, because who wants to be baptized must come down to the source as Jesus went down to the Jordan River. The steps up represent the resurrection. The overhead light that illuminates it stands out the function.

=== The stoups ===
The stoups are located on the side of the entrance and were designed in 2001 in harmony with the other furnishings and sacred spaces. They have the octagonal shape, already present in the baptismal font, taken from the classical tradition. The materials used are: White Carrara marble for the stem and mirror stainless steel for basin.

=== The sculptures ===
The large crucifix at the center of the apse was made of linden wood by Caspani and painted by Angela Martinelli. The statue of the Holy Virgin and Child is the work of sculptor Marco Corradini. Made in 1992 in lime wood, it is composed by twenty-eight pieces with an empty soul at the center. The same sculptor Marco Corradini, is the author of the Stations of the Cross. The large statue of the risen Christ, located above the baptismal font, was originally located at the center of the apse, where it is now instead of the large crucifix.

=== The paintings ===
==== Saint Charles ====
The painting of Saint Charles can be dated roughly between the late eighteenth and early nineteenth century. The analysis of the paintings of San Carlo and the Sacred Heart was conducted by Elena Sangalli. San Carlo is depicted half-length in traditional cardinal's robes, in an attitude of prayer in front of a small crucifix. The representation of the hands, foreshortened downward, suggest the major dimensions of the work, especially in the vertical direction. The drawing is abruptly interrupted in its lower edge; in the right corner you can indeed notice a hint of red drapery. The cut image may result from irreparable damage to the canvas or from a specific request of the restoration contractor. The canvas resize operation was a practice commonly used in the case of change of destination. The framework has been for a long time in the parish house of Rho before being donated to the Saint Charles Parish.

==== Sacred Heart ====
The picture of the Sacred Heart is a print (52x69 cm.). It looks damaged in some parts, especially in the corners where you can see the tear back together. The surface was protected with a considerable layer of paint which with time has assumed a yellowish hue. The dating can be between 1900 and 1930. It was donated to the parish by a private.

==== Holy Family ====
The painting was executed by the painter Egidio Romano Lombardi. The painter describes his work in this way: "It was realized on a board in 135x210 cm polished stucco with ancient technique, revisited with the use of acrylic pigments. The painting depicts a peaceful family scene, set to the work of the young Jesus ".

==== Sait Christopher ====
This painting was donated to the parish by the inhabitants of the nearby San Carlo Farmhouse San Cristoforo. He was in the chapel, existing until 1995, dedicated to the saint, built at the end of 1800 instead of the previous Oratory of St. Christopher.

=== The bell tower ===
The bell tower has three bells, made by Capanni company. The one who sings the musical note "A" is the largest, it weighs 340 kg and it has as its frieze of the image of the Madonna. The other two sing "B" and "D flat", they weigh 230 and 162 kg. And are decorated respectively from the figures of Saints Ambrose and Saint Charles. They were blessed by Don Franco Perlatti October 2, 1994.

== The chapel ==
The chapel was inaugurated on November 4, 2004, the day of the feast of St. Charles, although for liturgical requirements was already used since some months before it. It can be accessed from a separate entrance on the right side of the churchyard, or through a door of communication within the church. It was designed to have a more intimate and friendly environment celebrations on weekdays. It can contain up to 60 people. The structure is simple: the center of a curved wall of the altar is placed, consisting of a wooden table reminiscent of the Last Supper. All the furnishings of the chapel were donated by parishioners from the crucifix, in living memory, it has always belonged to the inhabitants of Moia farm. It was placed at the end of a common staircase leading to the gallery onto which there were bedrooms. During a visit to a sick person he was noticed by the parish priest Franco Perlatti, who was amazed at its beauty and preciousness. So the inhabitants of the farm decided to donate the crucifix to Don Franco and replace it with a lower value one. Don Franco remembered this gift when he began to celebrate mass in the local rented in Piazza Togliatti and handed it back to the community. On the door of the tabernacle there is an icon that represents Christ, painted with natural colors (egg and special mixtures) by an artist of Kalambaka (Greece). The wooden statue of the Madonna who gives us Jesus was made in Garfagnana.

== Bibliography ==
- San Bartolomeo: una ricostruzione storica delle vicende della parrocchiale (in Italian). Brugherio: Parrocchia San Bartolomeo Brugherio. 1994.
- Magni, Chiara (2004). La storia della Chiesa di San Carlo (in Italian). Brugherio: Parrocchia San Carlo Brugherio.
