= Saint Margaret, Brugherio =

Coordinates: 45°33′29.37″N 9°18′29.68″E

Saint Margaret (Chiesetta di Santa Margherita)
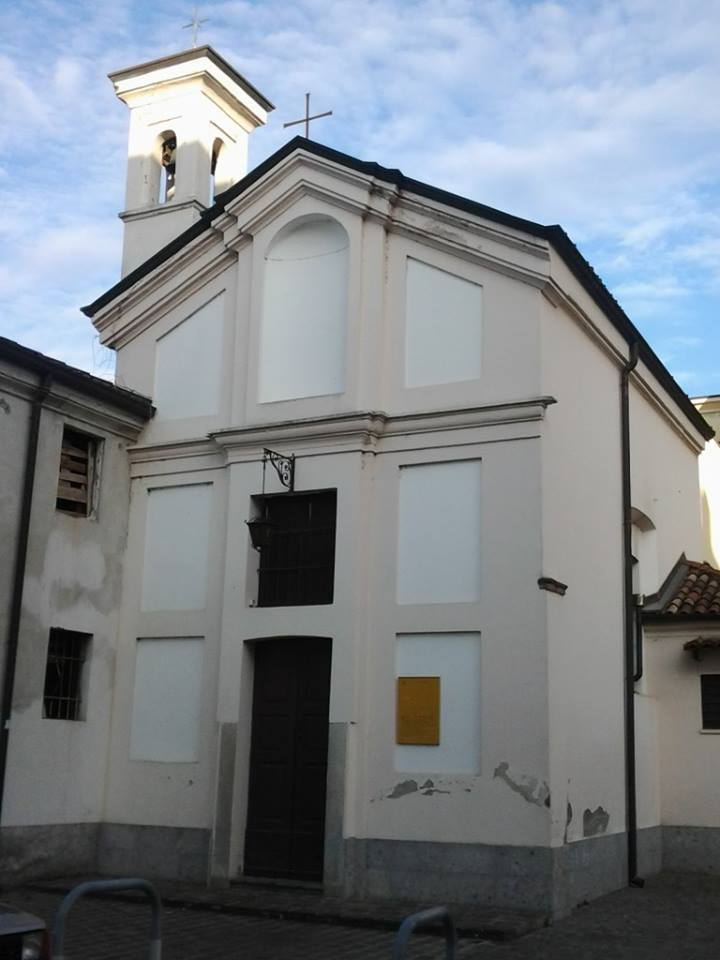
- Exterior view of the church

Religion
- Affiliation: Roman Catholic
- Province: Monza and Brianza
- Region: Lombardy
- Patron: Saint Margaret
- Status: Church

Location
- Municipality: Brugherio
- State: Italy
- Interactive map of Saint Margaret (Chiesetta di Santa Margherita)

Architecture
- Type: Church

The church of Saint Margaret (Italian: Chiesetta di Santa Margherita) is a 16th-century chapel dedicated to Saint Margaret of Antioch. It is located in Cassina Baraggia, Brugherio, Italy. The church is adjacent to the Villa Brivio, to which it belonged.

== Description ==
=== History ===
The day after the pastoral visit of Charles Borromeo in Brugherio (to establish the church of Saint Bartholomew) in 1578, the archbishop visited the church of Saint Margaret in Baraggia, which was then attached to the house of Giovan Battista Bernareggi (now Villa Brivio). The church consisted of an arched chapel, a separated altar which did not follow canonical rules, and a round window on the front. It did not have a holy stone, bell nor vestments. The Mass was celebrated only on Saint Margaret's day.

After 1594, the church's poor structural condition demanded that the celebration of Masses should be suspended. Giovan Battista Bernareggi's son pledged to restore the church and provide its furnishing. This was because the church was "important to the spiritual needs" of the inhabitants of Baraggia.

=== Architecture and art ===
The church was rebuilt many times. The current plan is elliptical, masked externally by the square structure. The balustrades of the presbytery and the sacristy doors (made of painted wood and imitation marble) alternating with one another, make the interior regular-shaped. The altar (made of marble and wood), is topped by a nineteenth-century painting of the Crucifixion. This painting is thought to replace a previous one (portraying Saint Margaret with the palm of martyrdom), which is now placed on the left wall of the nave. The ceiling has a 17th-century fresco with a fake rectangular frame supported by brackets. It depicts a portion of the sky with the Assumption. On the left wall of the church there is a niche that contains a baroque statue in painted gilded wood. It represents the Virgin of the Rosary. The exterior of the church is simple: its façade is gabled, with prominent cornices in its mid and top portions. It counts with a bell tower that rises to the left of the façade.

== Bibliography ==
- Tribuzio Zotti, Luciana (1986). Brugherio nei documenti (in Italian). Brugherio: Musicografica Lombarda.
- Tribuzio Zotti, Luciana (1987). Brugherio: luoghi memorabili (in Italian). Brugherio: Edizioni Parole Nuove.
- Brugherio: i suoi luoghi, la sua storia: 225. anniversario del primo volo italiano in mongolfiera con uomini a bordo (in Italian). Brugherio: Comune di Brugherio. 2009.
