= Villa Somaglia-Balconi =

Villa in Brugherio, Italy

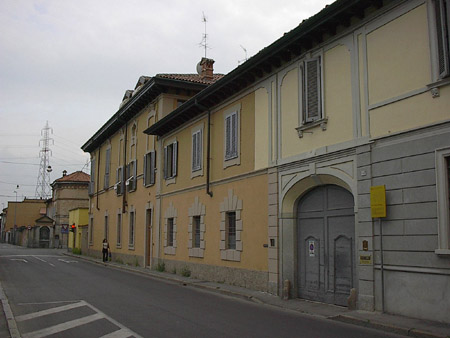
- Villa Somaglia-Balconi
- Interactive map of the Villa Somaglia-Balconi area

General information
- Location: Via Marsala, Brugherio, Italy
- Coordinates: 45.54821°N 9.292°E
- Client: Pestagalli, Somaglia and Balconi families

Villa Somaglia-Balconi is a residential complex located in Brugherio, consisting of a main house and some accompanying buildings, which are separated from the original structure of the villa by Via Marsala, which leads from Moncucco to Carugate.

== History ==
The complex is located in Pobbia, once included in the municipality of Moncucco. Pobbia, dates back to 1457, as a farm named Pobia. In 1459, nobleman Francesco Pestagalli, owner of Cascina Pobia, was given a privilege of tax exemption for the farm by the Duchess Bianca Maria Visconti. The mansion, owned by Pestagalli, was built in Pobbia in the first half of the eighteenth century. In the nineteenth century, Pestagalli took over Della Somaglia's finances, and since 1890 the villa became the property of the Balconi family, who still owned the property by the end of the twentieth century. Balconi then commissioned a substantial restoration, with the addition of habitable floors, balconies and dormers. Until the eighties, the house counted with a chapel open to the public, built in 1681 by Anna Crespi Recalcati as help for people with children. It is now in ruins.

== Architecture ==
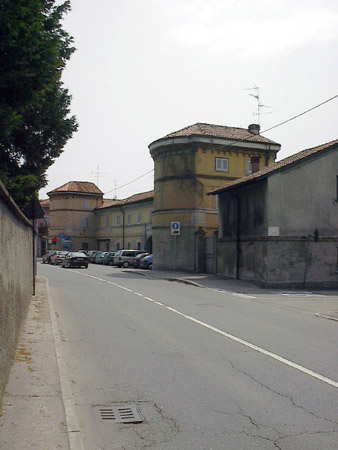
Villa Somaglia remains

The mansion, with an L-shaped floor plan, was built in the first half of the eighteenth century. Inside, on its larger side, there is a triple portico that leads into the central hall. A staircase leads to the "noble" floor. Of its Italian garden, which has been much reduced, few traces are visible. Today, crossing Via Marsala one can find the remains of previous constructions, including a long building with two chatelaine-shaped angular towers which are slightly higher than the main building, formerly used as private residences.

== Bibliografia ==
- Tribuzio Zotti, Luciana (1986). Brugherio nei documenti (in Italian). Brugherio: Musicografica Lombarda.
- Tribuzio Zotti, Luciana (1989). Brugherio luoghi memorabili (in Italian). Brugherio: Edizioni Parole Nuove.
