= St. Paul's Church, Brugherio =

Church building in Brugherio, Italy

Saint Paul (Chiesa di San Paolo)
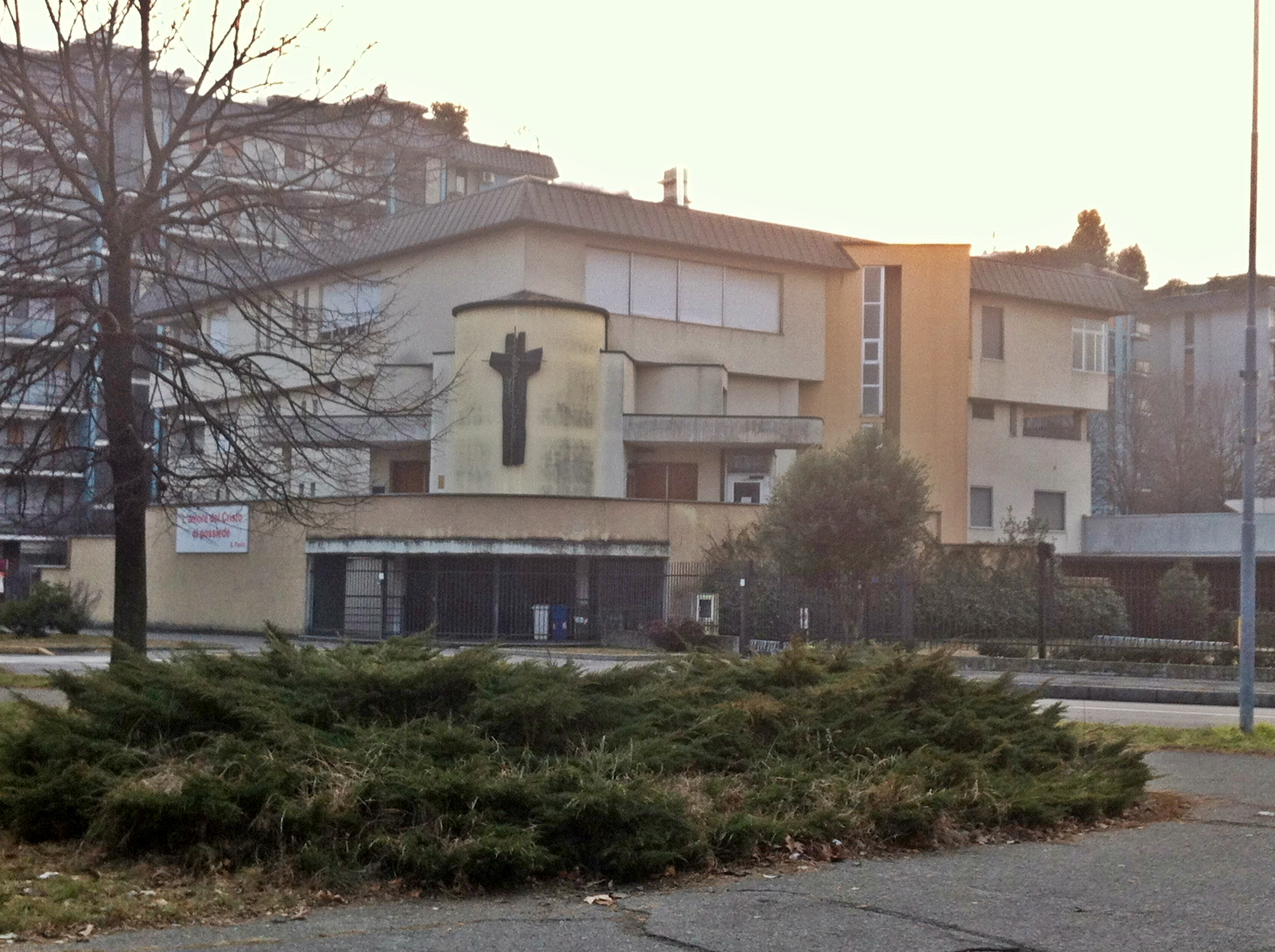

Religion
- Affiliation: Roman Catholic
- Province: Monza and Brianza
- Region: Lombardy
- Patron: Paul the Apostle
- Year consecrated: 1971
- Status: Church

Location
- Municipality: Brugherio
- State: Italy
- Interactive map of Saint Paul (Chiesa di San Paolo)
- Coordinates: 45.54452°N 9.29910°E

St. Paul's Church is a church dedicated to St. Paul the Apostle located in the south of Brugherio. It is part of the pastoral community Epiphany of the Lord.

== History ==
After the building of the district of Edilnord in the south of Brugherio, there was a need for a religious outlet for the residents of the new district. So, on spacious grounds donated by the Cazzaniga family, a pastoral center was built auxiliary to the main parish of Saint Bartholomew. At first, the community gathered in a large hall where all the sacred vessels were placed and which was perceived by the faithful more and more like a real church.

In 1971, with the official recognition of the community as a parish, the first parish priest, Father Michele Raffo, came. In 1991 renovations began, giving the building the appearance of a church, both inside and outside.

== Architecture ==
When the building was renovated, the most important and significant project concerned the chancel. French sculptor Marie-Michèle Poncet was assigned to realize its main décor such ambon, altar, tabernacle and baptistery. The artist created her works in pink marble from Portugal; its formal and chromatic characteristics combined harmoniously with the red-green macchiavecchia, a precious material from Switzerland, widely used in Ambrosian churches and for this chancel. Poncet was inspired by the meaning of the Christian cross, which was described by Pope John Paul II as "the beginning of everything". She placed then, at the center of the altar, a cross that appears between two bearing blocks of marble and represents the creation, as well as the origin and core of life.

The ambon is designated as "place of the Word". Its main features are two characters, placed facing one another: a prophet, holding the Tables of the Law, who figures the Old Testament, and an evangelist who is the symbol of the New Testament, carrying a cross. The position of the arms and bodies of the two draws an X, which represents the Christian cross. The shelf below the church tabernacle recalls an angel's wing, because the Eucharist is celebrated as "the bread of angels".

The baptismal font is the last marble element made by the French artist. It is located in the chapel housed in the counterfaçade. The baptismal font brings to mind a capital and depicts water, fire, robe and chrism: basic symbols of the liturgy of baptism in the Christian tradition.

== Bibliography ==
- San Bartolomeo: una ricostruzione storica delle vicende della parrocchiale (in Italian). Brugherio: Parrocchia San Bartolomeo Brugherio. 1994.
- Brugherio: i suoi luoghi, la sua storia: 225º anniversario del primo volo italiano in mongolfiera con uomini a bordo (in Italian). Brugherio: Comune di Brugherio. 2009.
