= Increa Park =

Urban public park in Brugherio, Italy

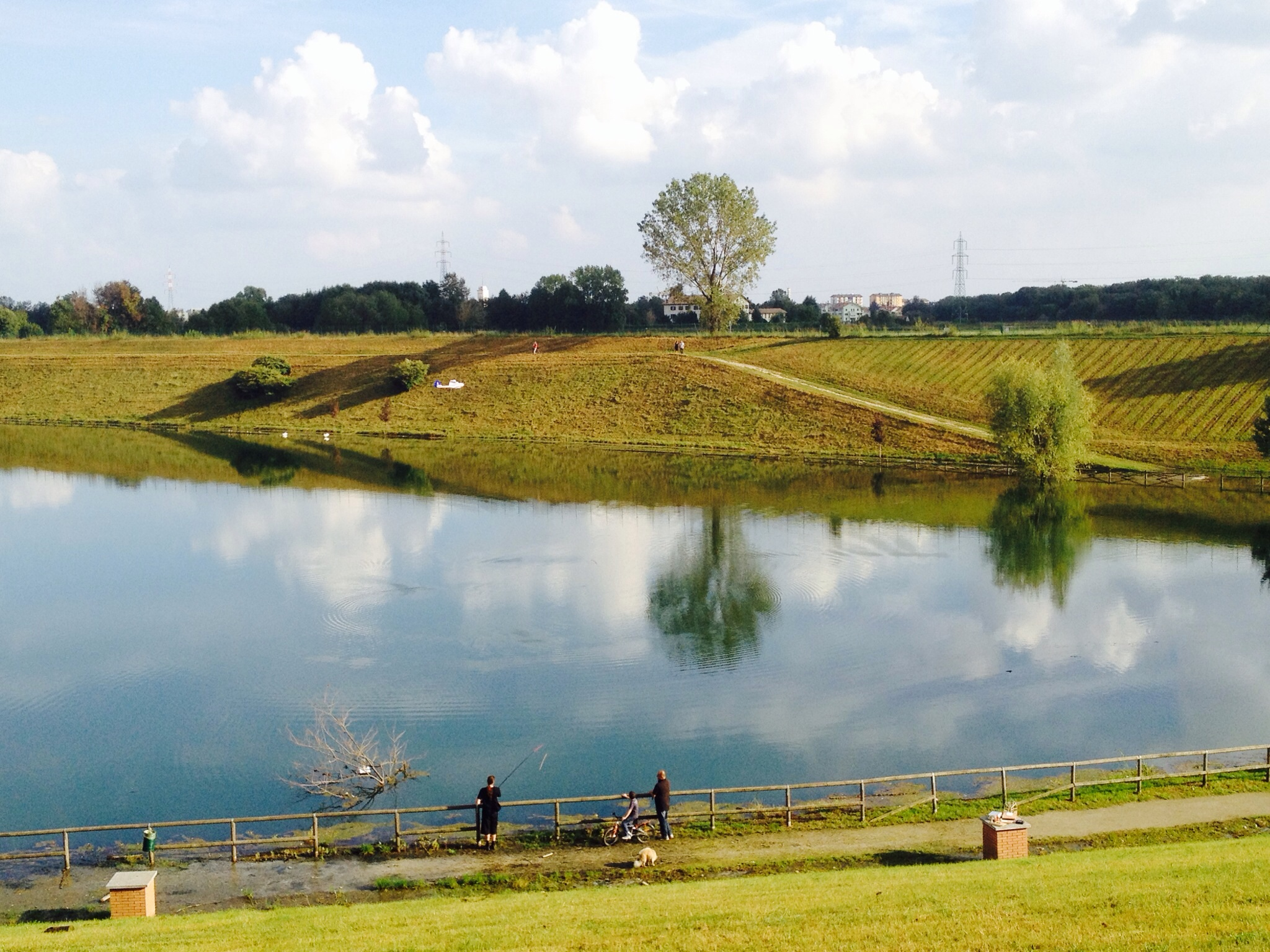
- Artificial lake
- Interactive map of Increa Park
- Type: Urban park
- Location: Brugherio in Lombardy, Italy
- Coordinates: 45.5408°N 9.3202°E
- Area: 33 hectares (82 acres)
- Owner: Municipality of Brugherio
- Status: 1 Nov. – 28 Feb. 8:00–17:00; 1 Mar. – 31 Mar. 8:00–18:30; 1 Apr. – 30 Sep. 8:00–20:00; 1 Oct. – 31 Oct. 8:00–18:30

The Increa Park is a green area in communal ownership in the south-west part of Brugherio, in Lombardy. Inside the Italian park is a large lake and the remains of the Increa Quarry (in Italian cava Increa), which gives its name to the park. This park is part of a larger national park called Parco Est delle Cave. It borders Cernusco sul Naviglio and it is near Milan's eastern bypass road (in Italian tangenziale Est). It covers about 33 hectares.

== History ==
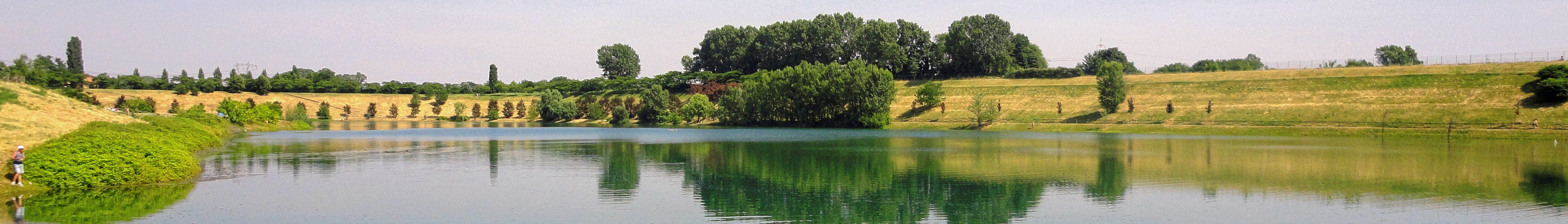
Panorama of the Increa Park

Historically, the land now occupied by the park, which had been used for agriculture and as a quarry, belonged to a farmhouse called Cascina Increa. This Increa farm still exists, close to the park, and is a rare surviving example of rural architecture during the Renaissance. Beginning in 1960, aggregates were extracted from the quarry. The first attempts to share this land began between 1985 and 1987, when the land was bought by the Brugherio Commune. The park opened in 1994, and since then there have been over twenty years of improvements that transformed it into an urban park.

== Description ==
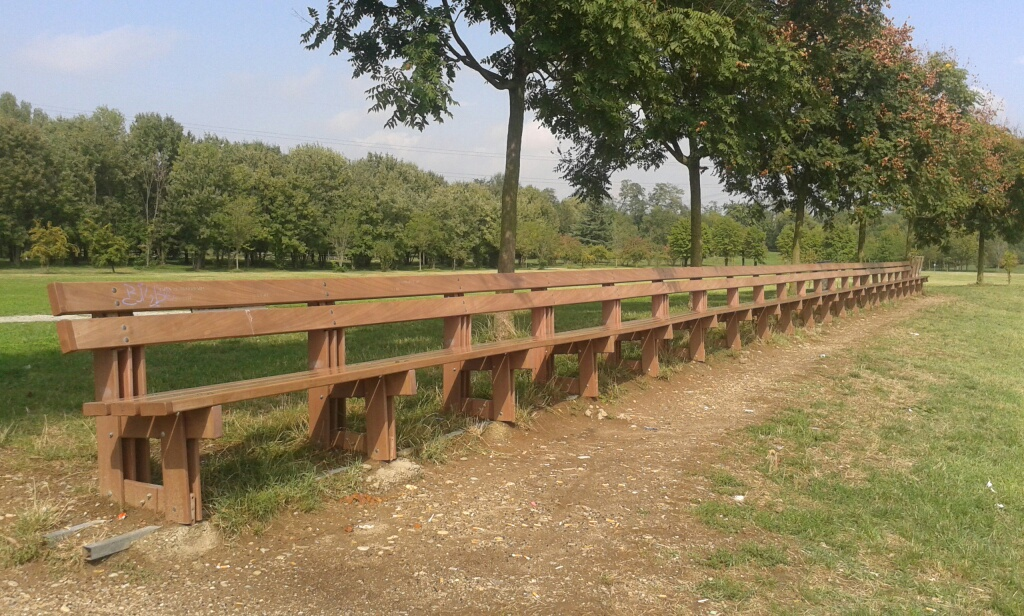
The longest recycled plastic bench

Inside the park there is a reservoir that occupies almost half of the total area. Visitors are not allowed to swim in the water. Other distinctive features of the park are: the bird snare (in Italian roccolo) made up of lime trees recovered from Manara street, the three monumental plane trees located in the north of the park, and what is said to be the longest recycled plastic bench in Italy.

The park hosts entertainment, including sports events like cyclo-cross. The sports are generally in the summer. There are rest areas, including covered areas with a stage. There is a bar located in the park called "Masnada" that hosts regular events, including live bands who provide free entertainment. Masnada provides the only hot food in the park, as visitors are not allowed to light fires in the park.
