= Cascina Guzzina =

- Guscina (Lombard)
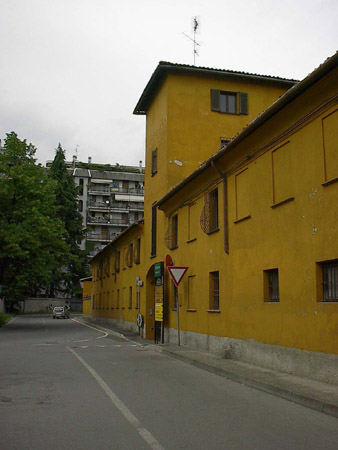
- Interactive map of the Cascina Guzzina area

General information
- Type: Farmhouse
- Location: Brugherio, Via Guzzina, Via Volturno, Italy
- Coordinates: 45°32′30.99″N 9°17′41.27″E
- Inaugurated: 16th–18th centuries

Cascina Guzzina (Brianzoeu: Guscina [ɡyˈʃina]) is a farmhouse located in the southern part of Brugherio, on the border with Cologno Monzese. The name comes from gussetta, which formerly referred to the cocoon of the silkworm, whose breeding was widespread in the area. Agricultural complexes known as "agricultural courts", which once held prolific agricultural activity, are now civilian residences and businesses.

== Architecture ==
The complex, which already existed in the sixteenth century, retains typical characteristics of rural architecture. The entrance to the farm is located west on Via Guzzina and features a turret on top. The small church of Santa Maria degli Angeli can be found a few feet to the south, its profile standing along the complex's perimeter wall. The lintel of the front door bears a commemorative inscription about the Virgin Mary. On the south side of the building there is a detached wing housing a small convent built in ancient times by the Capuchin friars. To the north, on Via Volturno, there is an entrance to the garden villa, built by nobleman De Capitani from Vimercate during the eighteenth century. It is u-shaped and is placed inside of the farm, almost at its center.

== History ==
The census of 1530, at the beginning of the Spanish domination, shows that the area of the farm belonged to the Court of Monza and Milan, extending for 650 poles (43 hectares (0.43 km^{2})). Its owners were Galeazzo Alfieri and prosecutor Francesco Pagano. When St. Charles Borromeo, archbishop of Milan, founded the parish of St. Bartholomew in Brugherio during 1578, Cascina Guzzina was in the territory administrated by the new parish. Documents from 1646 pertaining to a pastoral visit show that Vicar Foraneo visited the Church of St. Bartholomew, the Guzzina, and the oratory of Santa Maria degli Angeli (then dedicated to Saint Andrew), belonging to superintendent and Senator Andrea Alfieri. Another known owner of the farm was Count Giuseppe De Capitani from Vimercate. Ancient chronicles state that the farm counted with very experienced farmers and its soil was known for its quality wine production. The Sommarione of 1751 in the Cadastre Teresian lists other small owners of the land, such as the Sisters of St. Ursula, the Pestagalli family, Marquis Silva, Counts Scotti and Litta.

Following administrative reform implemented by Empress Maria Theresa of Austria in 1769, Cascina Guzzina was annexed officially to the closest municipality: Moncucco. Subsequently, Moncucco, became part of the municipality of Brugherio, as established by Royal Decree on December 9, 1866. In Sommarioni maps in the Cadastre Lombardo-Veneto of the year 1871, the Perego di Cremnago residence (used as a holiday home), a private chapel dedicated to the Magi, as well as farmhouses and extensive grounds are listed. These properties then passed to the counts of Venino.

== Church of Santa Maria degli Angeli ==
In the south part of the Cascina Guzzina, a white outline shows the facade of a church dedicated to the Virgin Mary, as indicated in the inscription on the lintel of this entrance. The church, probably of 16th century origins, was once part of a small Franciscan monastery. Later, according to the will of the different noble owners of the villa, it has had various dedications: to Saint Andrew, to Saint Mary of the Angels, and finally to the three Magi.

The interior consists of a small rectangular room with a raised chancel, separated from the nave by a marble balustrade and enhanced by the presence of two pilasters. The altar is in gray marble and is leaning against the back wall which is highlighted by precious paintings. Between two paintings there are reproduced illusionistically two niches where are depicted false columns surmounted by angels in prayer. Above the altar there is a painting in seventeenth century style representing the Virgin and Child, Saint Francis of Assisi showing hands with the stigmata and Saint Paul, with the classic attributes of the book and the sword. The heads of the Madonna and Child are adorned with crowns of gold, silver and precious stones, donated by the inhabitants of Cascina Guzzina in the fifties as a sign of devotion and thanksgiving for favors received and the protection granted. Below the painting in the background, you can recognize the Portiuncula, the small church of Saint Mary of the Angels, located on the outskirts of Assisi. The Porziuncola is linked to the life of Saint Francis and Saint Clare and, due to this fact, it so dear to the Franciscan tradition. The painting, which dates back to the period when the church was dedicated to Saint Mary of the Angels, is framed by a white stucco decoration. On either side depicts two candlesticks, decorated with festoons, bearing the monogram of the Virgin Mary; these decorations are inserted into two painted pilasters. On the lintel, above the painting, there are two angels holding a medallion depicting the monogram of Christ "JHS", that stands for Jesus Hominum Salvator. The ceiling of the church is completely frescoed: on the small nave shows a clear sky, in the presbytery it appears several times the monogram of the Virgin Mary, alternating with festoons and floral decorations, led by two angels in glory. The left aisle leads to a small room where it is possible to attend the Mass. In this room there are fragments of frescoes which appear fake architecture and, on the right, a small closet. On the doors, finely decorated in a seventeenth-century style, appear flowers, angels and the letters S and R suggest that the contents of the cabinet: Holy Relics. On the floor above this room there is another similar space where it was possible to participate in the Holy Mass. In fact from the presbytery it is possible to see the wooden lattice from which you could assist at Mass.

== Bibliography ==
- Brugherio: i suoi luoghi, la sua storia: 225º anniversario del primo volo italiano in mongolfiera con uomini a bordo (in Italian). Brugherio: Comune di Brugherio. 2009.
- Tribuzio Zotti, Luciana (1986). Brugherio nei documenti (in Italian). Brugherio: Musicografica Lombarda.
- Cooperativa Agricola di Consumo. Le nostre cascine – Calendario 1989 (in Italian). Brugherio.
- Cooperativa Agricola di Consumo. Luoghi di orazione – Calendario 2011 (in Italian). Brugherio.
