= Saint Mary Immaculate, Brugherio =

Religious building in Brugherio, Italy

Coordinates: 45.54164°N 9.31261°E

Saint Mary Immaculate (Chiesa di Santa Maria Immacolata)
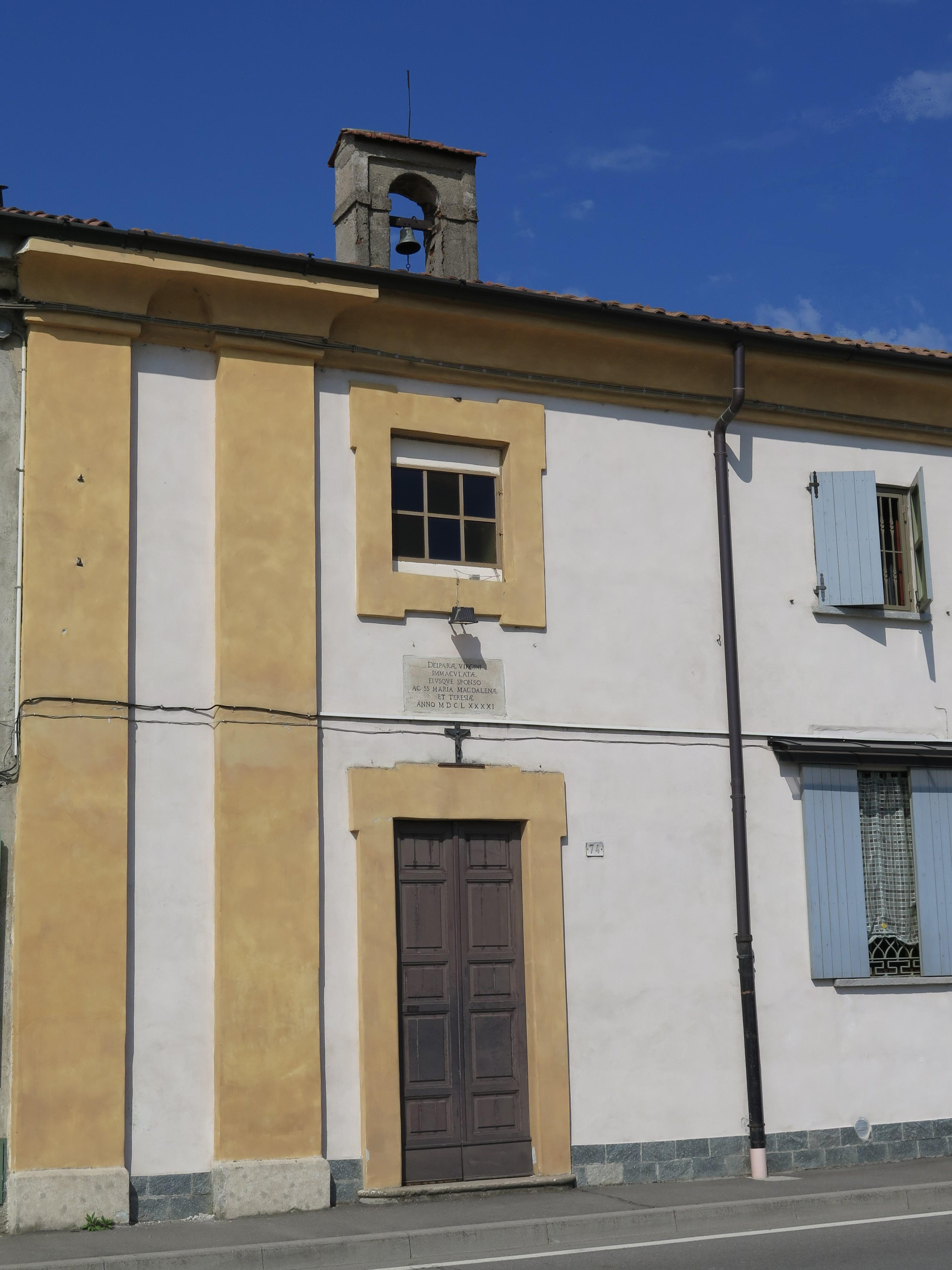
- Exterior view of the church

Religion
- Affiliation: Roman Catholic
- Province: Monza and Brianza
- Region: Lombardy
- Patron: Virgin Mary, Saint Joseph, Saint Mary Magdalene, Saint Teresa of Ávila
- Year consecrated: 1691
- Status: Church

Location
- Municipality: Brugherio
- State: Italy
- Interactive map of Saint Mary Immaculate (Chiesa di Santa Maria Immacolata)

Architecture
- Completed: 1691

The church of Saint Mary Immaculate is a church that is annexed to Cascina Increa, next to the entrance of Villa Tizzoni Ottolini in Brugherio. The church has undergone renovations, however, like the farmhouse to which it is attached, has maintained its original architecture. Increa, the area where the church is located, formerly belonged to the municipality of Cernusco Asinario (now Cernusco sul Naviglio); it became part of the parish of Saint Bartholomew in 1578 and was subsequently annexed to the municipality of Brugherio in 1866.

== Architecture and arts ==
The entrance to the church is located between two pilasters. Above the door there is a plaque whose inscription commemorates the dedication to Mary Immaculate, Saint Joseph, Saint Mary Magdalene, Saint Teresa of Ávila that took place in 1691. The church is quadrangular with a rectangular apse where a late baroque marble altar is placed; the altar has a curvilinear shape that follows the slight concavity of the junction between the bottom wall and the side walls. In a niche above the altar there is a twentieth-century statue of the Madonna and Child. A marble altarpiece with a molded cornice frames the niche, inserted within a decoration depicting eighteenth-century columns and garlands of flowers, which itself gives the impression of greater depth.

High on the wall there is a quadrangular window. A pluteo in shaped pink marble separates the presbytery from the nave. On the vault of the presbytery there are symbols of the four Evangelists; the latter decorations were probably confected, along with the decoration of the vault of the nave, prior to the altar's decoration. The ceiling of the nave celebrates the Virgin Mary through four shields which represent four different names of Madonna chosen from litany entries. At the center of the vault a dove is placed in a panel, which is made of plaster, representing the Holy Spirit. On the walls of the presbytery, there are two paintings with a single carved wooden frame. The left one shows the Agony of Saint Joseph, while the right one the Adoration of the Magi in a garland of flowers; this form was spread in the figurative lombard painting typical of the seventeenth century. Along the nave several plaques are found in memory of the building's former owners. To the right, next to a plaque in memory of Ester Zanzoterra Robbiani, stands the neoclassical plate commissioned by Elisabetta Napollon in memory of her husband Giulio Ottolini Visconti, who died on July 26, 1839. It is a white marble bas-relief, depicting the woman's profile, sitting with her head bowed as if expressing sadness. The woman cries on a Roman amphora on whose center a portrait of Count Ottolini is sculpted.

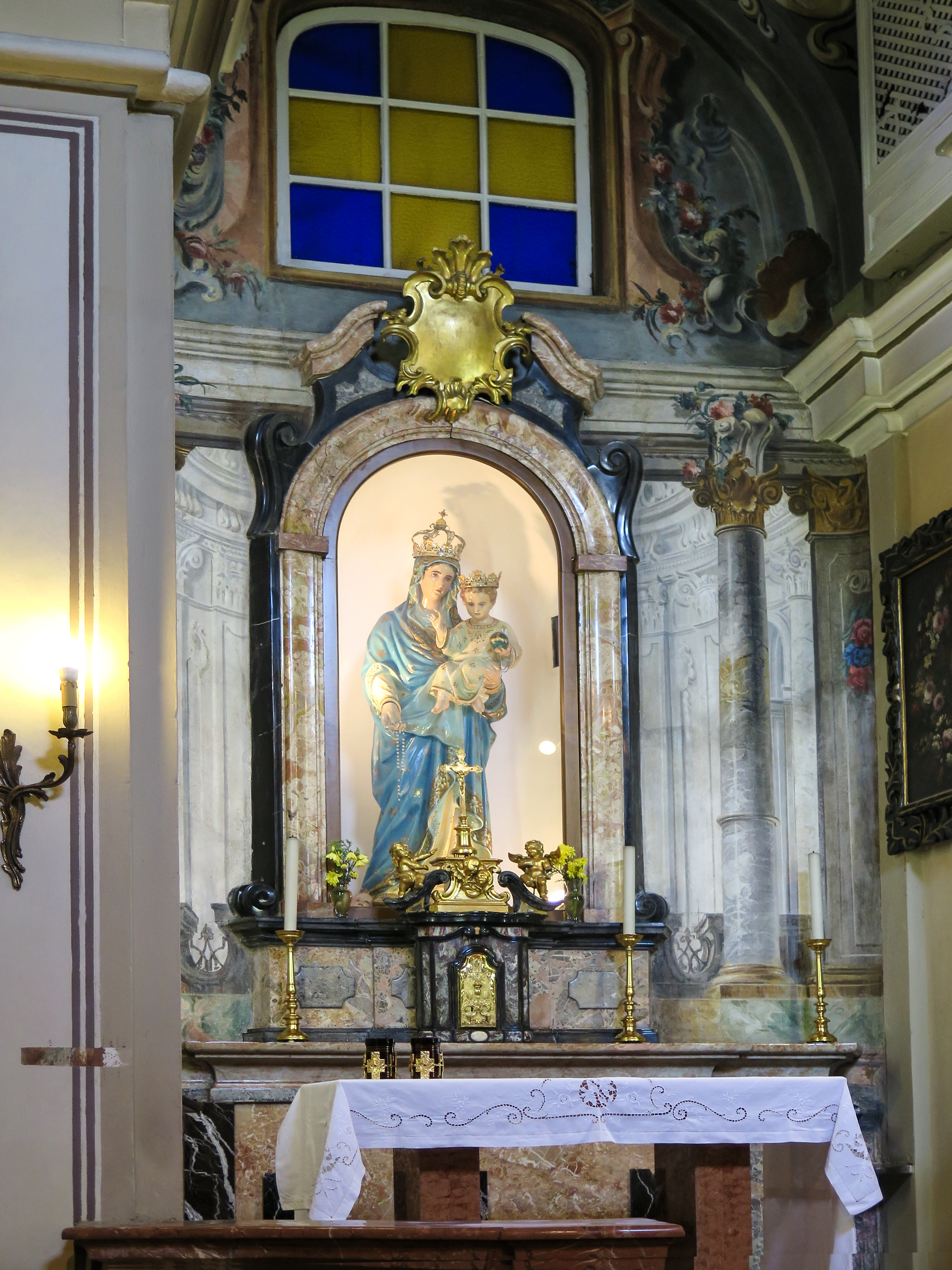
Altar inside the church

== Bibliography ==
- Brugherio: i suoi luoghi, la sua storia: 225. anniversario del primo volo italiano in mongolfiera con uomini a bordo (in Italian). Brugherio: Comune di Brugherio. 2009.
- Brugherio Il suo territorio 2000 anni di storia Il suo comune 100 anni di feconda attività (in Italian). Brugherio.
