= Cimitero Storico =

Cemetery in Italy

Coordinates: 45°33′22.06″N 9°17′54.71″E

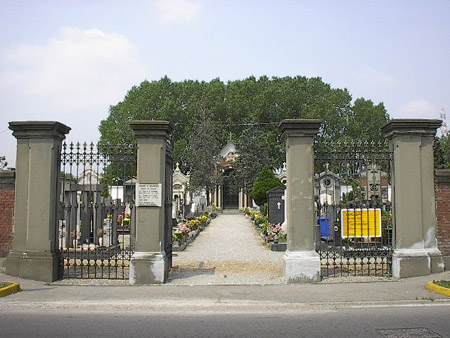
- Main entrance
- Interactive map of Cimitero Storico

Details
- Established: 1787
- Location: Brugherio
- Country: Italy

Cimitero Storico (Italian for "historic cemetery") is a historic cemetery located in Viale Lombardia, between Via Cajani and Via Virgilio in Brugherio, Lombardy, Italy. It was originally located in the block between Viale Lombardia, Via Vittorio Veneto and Via Galvani.

== History ==
The cemetery was built in Brugherio in 1787 and, as required by law, placed outside the town. It stood above a plot belonging to Gaspare Ghirlanda, one of the largest landowners of the time. In 1894, the village having expanded, the cemetery was moved further north, along Viale Lombardia. In the eighteenth century, cadastral maps show another space probably used as a cemetery, called prato del Larrazetto, located between Via San Maurizio and Via San Cristoforo. It and was used as a burial ground for plague victims. During the "plague of Saint Charles" in 1576, a mass grave had to be created to bury the large number of people who died as a result of the epidemic.

== Arts ==
The area devoted to exhumations, with a brick and finely-worked iron fence, was used until the end of the 1960s. Inside the area, one can find the chapel for the celebration of Mass, as well as the tombstones of former priests and pastors of Brugherio, such as Don Gian Andrea Nova. Now missing several stones and marble, the cemetery also houses remains of local historical figures, such as of Dr. Paul Veladini, his wife, his brother Michael, their children and grandchildren.
