= Small Church of Saint Anne (Brugherio) =

Coordinates: 45°34′3.37″N 9°18′17.09″E

- Chiesetta di Sant'Anna
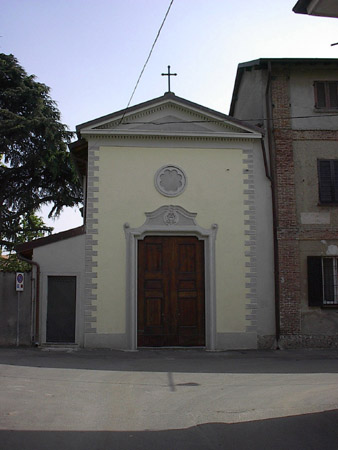

Religion
- Affiliation: Roman Catholic
- Diocese: Lombardy
- Province: Monza and Brianza
- Patron: Saint Anne

Location
- Location: Brugherio, Italy
- Interactive map of Small Church of Saint Anne

Architecture
- Type: Church

The Chiesetta di Sant'Anna, or Small Church of Saint Anne, is a Roman Catholic church located in San Damiano, a hamlet of Brugherio, in the Province of Monza and Brianza, Italy.

== History ==
The church, known as "geseta de Sant'Anna", is located on the site of a ninth century church dedicated to Saints Cosmas and Damian, itself attached to a monastery. During his pastoral visit in 1578, Charles Borromeo decided to demolish the building. In the eighteenth century the new church was built, consisting of a private chapel adjacent to the Villa Viganoni-Benavides, the summer residence of the Parravicini family during the nineteenth century. This was also demolished. The church was dedicated to Saint Anne probably by Antonio Parravicini and his wife Isabella Blasi. They placed the marble altar painting of the Education of the Virgin that came from another church in Milan. In 1808 Isabella Blasi added two plaques of black marble at the sides of the altar. The first is a petition to Saint Anne recommending father Blasio, the second a memorial plaque for the death of her husband and father.

== Architecture and arts ==
The nave is covered by a barrel vault, separated from the presbytery by a depressed arch with a Jesus's monogram in its center, and floral motifs at the sides. The left aisle leads to the sacristy, formerly used as a women's gallery, being accessible directly from the Villa. It underwent restorations, particularly of the five niches with murals consisting of faux marble friezes with archways in turn decorated with golden stars. These niches contain two wooden statues of the Virgin and Child and Saint Joseph, and a crown and a scepter with the palm leaves of martyrdom in reference to saints and martyrs. One can also find paintings depicting the Stations of the Cross and two paintings of the Madonna, as well as paintings of Saint Anne and Saint Joachim on the right and the Saints Cosmas and Damian opposite. The restoration of the main door, windows and furniture was carried out under the supervision of Belle Arti.

== Bibliography ==
- Tribuzio Zotti, Luciana (1987). Brugherio: luoghi memorabili (in Italian). Brugherio: Edizioni Parole Nuove.
- Porfidio, Vicky (2009). Brugherio: i suoi luoghi, la sua storia (in Italian). Brugherio: Comune di Brugherio.
