= Cascina Increa =

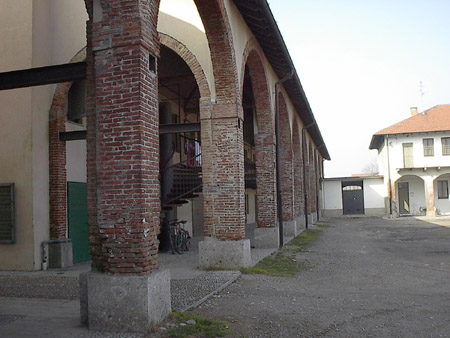

- Location within Italy

General information
- Type: Farmhouse
- Location: Brugherio, Via Increa, 62–76, Italy
- Coordinates: 45°32′27.5″N 9°18′44.4″E

Height
- Architectural: Renaissance architecture
- Roof: 2

Cascina Increa is one of the farmhouses of Brugherio, on the southeastern border of the municipality. It enjoys the protection of the Soprintendenze per i Beni Architettonici e Paesaggistici, i.e., the Ministry of Cultural Heritage and Activities and Tourism (MiBACT) of its respective province because of its surviving Renaissance architecture.

== History ==
The farm was part of the municipality of Cernusco Asinario (now Cernusco sul Naviglio) and it belonged to the Church of Gorgonzola. It takes its name from the term "clay" in reference to the nature of the terrain of an old brick kiln in the area. It was annexed to the parish of Saint Bartholomew of Brugherio in 1578. With the decree of 30 March 1871, the area was annexed to the City of Brugherio, that had been established by royal decree on 9 December 1866. In 1650 the counts of Litta built the farm as it stands today. According to documents of the Teresian land registry of 1721, the territory of the farm was under the Municipality of Cernusco sul Naviglio and 90% of it belonged to the noble Valentino Conti, while the villa was Count Zumenzù's. At the end of the nineteenth century the farm passed first to the noble Ottolini, then to the Tizzoni family and finally to the Robbiani family.

The Chronicles of the pastoral visit of Saint Charles Borromeo in 1578 show that the inhabitants of the farm totalled 27 and the parish had 1,000 inhabitants. At the end of the eighteenth century the inhabitants, who lived in cottages around the house of the owners, had increased to 144 and 1,300 perches of land were laboured with cereals and vines. The land was used for quarrying aggregates and sand in the twentieth century. In 1987 the City Council of Brugherio, thanks to regional fundraising, bought the complex and former quarry (Cava Increa – now Increa Park). The farm's living quarters were sold to families already living there. The barns, under the protection of Belle Arti, have been restored and are home to eleven apartments. The stables have been transformed into garages.

== Architecture ==
The farmhouse can be reached from the street via Increa. At the center there is Villa Tizzoni Ottolini, which housed old Milanese families on holiday. Now it houses businesses and private residences. The Church of Saint Mary Immaculate is located to its left, which was dedicated to the Blessed Virgin and Saint Teresa in 1691.

The interior of the farmhouse is made up of an arcaded back wall leading to the areas formerly inhabited by farmers. The right courtyard still hosts a farm with stables for livestock breeding. The main court on the left has large porches. The lower floor housed the kitchen, pantry, utility room and the living room. The first floor housed the bedrooms and presents an iron railing. Overlooking the entrance there were stables and barns; after the restoration their architectural structure has remained unchanged, but private houses take their place. Behind these structures, an arch leads to the courtyard where once there was a communal oven.

== Bibliography ==
- Brugherio: i suoi luoghi, la sua storia: 225. anniversario del primo volo italiano in mongolfiera con uomini a bordo (in Italian). Brugherio: Comune di Brugherio. 2009.
- Brugherio Il suo territorio 2000 anni di storia Il suo comune 100 anni di feconda attività (in Italian). Brugherio.
- Tribuzio Zotti, Luciana (1986). Brugherio nei documenti (in Italian). Brugherio: Musicografica Lombarda.
