= Villa Brivio, Brugherio =

Psychiatric center in Brugherio, Italy

Villa Brivio
- Interactive map of the Villa Brivio area

General information
- Type: Mental home center
- Location: Lombardy, Italy, via Santa Margherita, 28, Italy
- Coordinates: 45°33′30.66″N 9°18′28.65″E
- Completed: Nineteenth century
- Owner: Municipality of Brugherio

Technical details
- Floor count: 2

Villa Brivio is a 19th-century building in the Baraggia district of Brugherio, Italy. Owned by the municipality, it houses a residential center specializing in psychiatric therapy.

== History and architecture ==
Today's building is highly compartmentalized and is attached to a development overlooking the Via Santa Margherita. The only evidence of the original structure (dated to the 16th century and now lost) is the Church of Saint Margaret which is attached to the building. In 1869, the villa came under the ownership of Marquess Brivio, from whom it takes its present name. It was later bought by the Municipality of Brugherio and restored between 1994 and 1999. It now houses a psychiatric institution called Le Magnolie.

The U-shaped layout is the result of the villa's adaptations in the 19th century. A park was developed around the villa while it belonged to Giovan Battista Bernareggi. The buildings on either side of the main entrance include a porter's lodge. The drive leads into an inner courtyard flanked by an L-shape structure, composed of two parts, built separately in the 19th and 20th centuries. Behind the 20th-century addition, there is a park next with a belvedere turret rising slightly above the villa's roof. On the exterior, as decoration, there are string course cornices, wainscot and squares.

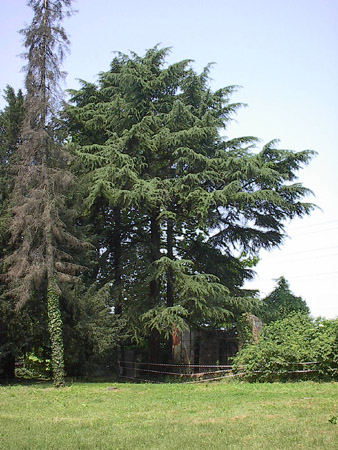
Villa Brivio's Park

The park next to Villa Brivio is a prominent green area in the city.

== Bibliography ==
- Tribuzio Zotti, Luciana (1987). Brugherio: luoghi memorabili (in Italian). Brugherio: Parole Nuove.
- Tribuzio Zotti, Luciana; Magni, Giuseppe (2012). Una città nel segno dei Magi: Brugherio 1613-2013 (in Italian). Brugherio: Associazione Kairos.
