= Brugherio =

Brugherio Brughee (Lombard)
- Comune
- Città di Brugherio
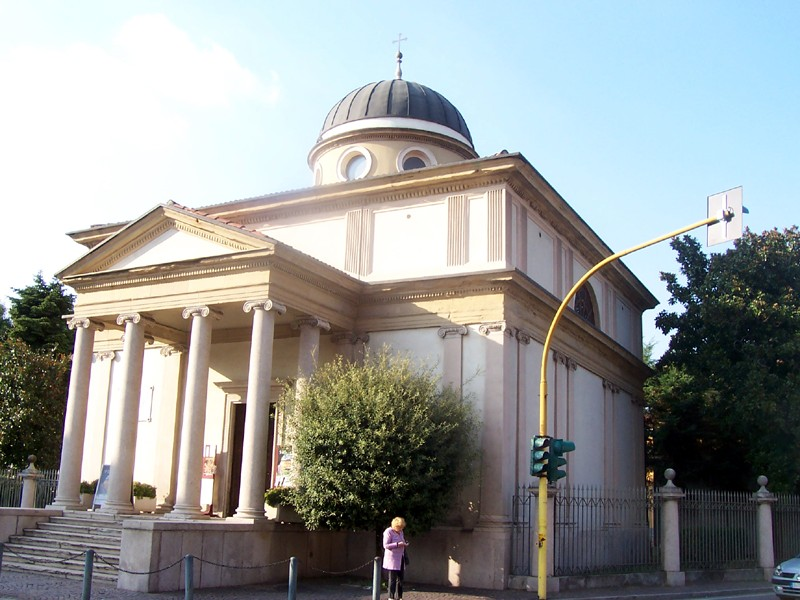
- St. Lucius church, Brugherio.

- Coat of arms

- Location within Italy Location within Lombardy
- Coordinates: 45°33′N 9°18′E
- Country: Italy
- Region: Lombardy
- Province: Monza and Brianza (MB)
- Frazioni: Baraggia, Dorderio, Moncucco, San Damiano

Government
  - Mayor: Marco Antonio Troiano

Area
  - Total: 10.44 km^{2} (4.03 sq mi)
- Elevation: 123 m (404 ft)

Population (30 November 2017)
  - Total: 34,864
  - Density: 3,339/km^{2} (8,649/sq mi)
- Demonym: Brugheresi
- Time zone: UTC+1 (CET)
  - Summer (DST): UTC+2 (CEST)
- Postal code: 20861
- Dialing code: 039
- Website: Official website

Brugherio (Italian: [bruˈɡɛːrjo]; Brianzoeu: Brughee [bryˈɡeː]) is a comune (municipality) in the Province of Monza and Brianza in the Italian region Lombardy, located about 10 kilometres (6 miles) northeast of Milan. It was established December 9, 1866 unifying the suppressed municipalities of Baraggia, San Damiano and Moncucco (which nowadays are frazioni of Brugherio), together with the villages of Bindellera, Cesena, Gelosa, San Paolo, Torazza, Occhiate and Increa.

Brugherio borders the following municipalities: Monza, Agrate Brianza, Carugate, Sesto San Giovanni, Cologno Monzese, Cernusco sul Naviglio.

Brugherio received the title of city with a presidential decree on 27 January 1967.

== Etymology ==
The name Brugherio is said to derive from Il Brugo which is Italian for common heather. This plant is common on the clay-type soil in the region and it features on the town's coat-of-arms.

== History ==
=== Origins and Middle Ages ===
The first written memory of Brugherio dates back to the Roman Empire when Noxiate, Sanctus Damianus, Baragia and Octavum were designated as the first settlements in the territory. Noxiate corresponded to the current town centre (where the parish church of Saint Bartholomew is now located), then split, during the Carolingian period, between Monza and Cologno Monzese. Baragia stretched north, including Sanctus Damianus, and south, where there is the present city center. Octavum corresponded to the current San Cristoforo and it was located at mile No. 8 of the Roman road leading from Milan to Monza. An 853 document recorded the presence of "a hospice or a hospital for pilgrims ...".

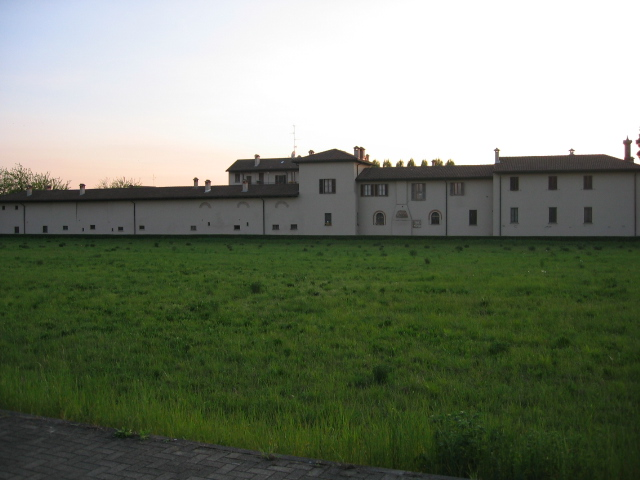
Cascina Sant'Ambrogio (former monastery of Benedictine nuns)

During the fourth century, the current Via dei Mille was a portion of Via Burdigalense and this area belonged to Ambrose, Bishop of Milan. This land was occupied by a monastery of the Benedictine nuns in 1098. Ambrose donated the property, and the convent which was there established, to his sister Marcellina, who had chosen to retire to contemplative life.

Between the twelfth and fourteenth centuries, the monastery and its territories went to other religious orders (including Humiliatis). Up to 1362 it was still nuns who kept the administration of land assets after the transfer in the monastery of Saint Bartolo in Rancate.

The fourteenth century saw the political struggles between Torriani and Visconti for the domain of Milan and the cities under its government. Such strife were also felt in Brugherio: in 1282 it is said that in Octavum rose a castrum which was contended between the two families. Up to these events, the current municipal area was already divided in three parishes: the current historic center and Moncucco belonged to Monza; Baraggia that was part of Vimercate and Increa that was under Gorgonzola's authority.

=== 16th and 17th centuries ===
During the sixteenth and seventeenth centuries, Brugherio suffered anarchy due to the wars between the French and the Spanish, endured the economic crisis that characterized the Spanish Lombardy at that time and was afflicted by repeated episodes of plague: the worsts were the one called "the plague of Saint Charles" (1576-1577) and one called the "plague of Manzoni" (1630), because it was described by Alessandro Manzoni in The Betrothed.

In the sixteenth century, the territory of the town was split: a portion with Monza, another with Vimercate and many other local farmhouses. Despite the years of decline, it was in 1578 that Brugherio found its first communal identity, when Saint Charles Borromeo established the parish of St. Bartholomew, unifying beneath the church the territories that were politically divided.

=== 18th century ===
The eighteenth century brought big political changes in Lombardy: in 1714, at the end of the War of the Spanish Succession (1700-1714), the Italian territories, belonging to Spain, went to the Austrian Habsburgs, who took back order in administration and wise economic measures. The Enlightenment, the social reforms and the government of Maria Theresa (1740-1780) led to prosperity, stimulating the development of handicraft and farming. Common cultivations were vines and mulberry trees, that were used to feed the silk worms, which were given by the owner to the tenant farmers. Mostly women and children worked on the breeding of silkworms.

Where the ancient castra stood, Milanese families built their summer residences: since 1600, Brugherio was a very appreciated holiday destination by local aristocrats. In this way the main villas in the area were constructed: Villa Fiorita, Palazzo Ghirlanda-Silva, Villa Sormani are just a few examples. It was precisely in the Villa Sormani where one of the most important events of the century took place: Count Paolo Andreani demonstrated the first public balloon flight on Italian soil, in 1784.

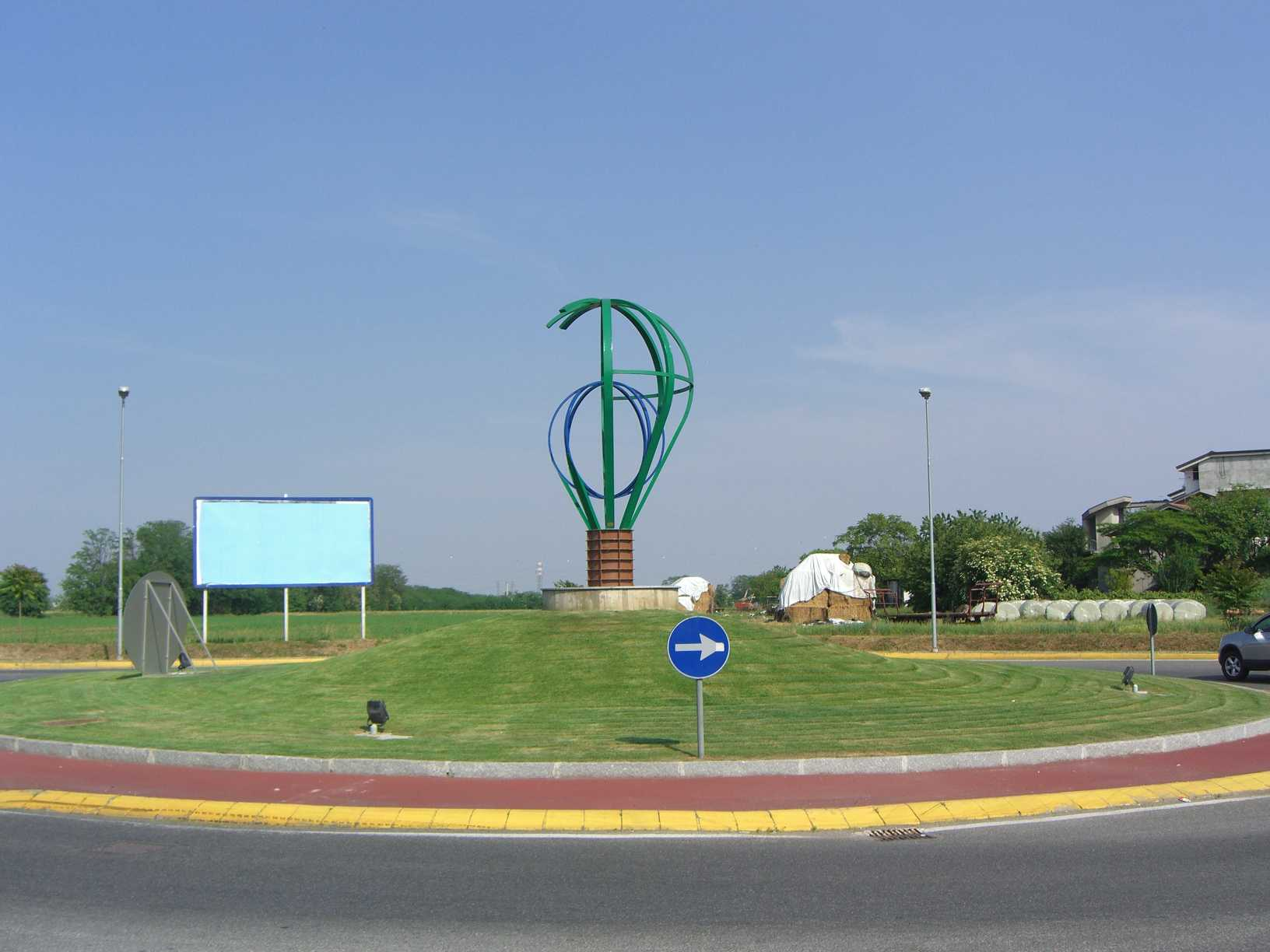
Monument celebrating the first Italian public balloon ascent by Paolo Andreani in 1784

=== 19th century ===
After the brief Napoleonic season in Italy, the coalition forces of Austria, Prussia, Russia and Great Britain succeeded to overthrow the Emperor of the French and to begin, following the Congress of Vienna, the period of Restoration. Lombardy, along with Veneto, were united in the Kingdom of Lombardy–Venetia, part of the Austrian Empire.

In 1816, landowners of Brugherio tried to merge their own territories into a single municipality, but the project failed due to the resistance of the Austrian bureaucrats of Milan, who did not want to waste time in unifying such a fragmented land.

During the same years, Gian Mario Andreani (brother of Paolo Andreani) and the architect Giocondo Albertolli succeeded in a memorable enterprise: they moved the Anthony of Padua's chapel built in Lugano, Switzerland, to Villa Sormani. In order to transport the chapel from Lugano to Moncucco, Albertolli first disassembled it, then he rebuilt it near count Gian Mario's villa. After it had been dismantled, he had the pieces shipped over Lake Lugano and then transported by land to Como. The pieces travelled over ten kilometers through the Naviglio Martesana arriving at the river port of Mattalino Bridge, where they were unloaded near Count Andreani's property. The work took from 1815–16 until after 1832. Anthony of Padua's chapel acquired then its new designation, becoming the little church dedicated to Saint Lucius (the so-called "little temple of Moncucco").

on 9 December 1866, the new municipality of Brugherio was established unifying Cassina Baraggia, San Damiano, Bindellera, Cesena, Gelosa, San Paolo, Torazza, Occhiate and Increa. The first mayor was the former one of Cassina Baraggia, Giovanni Noseda. The territory of Moncucco was added to the new municipality in 1871.

The years that went from 1866 to 1900 were quite drowsy. The municipality was run by a small class of landowners, who maintained relations with the local farmers that did not differ much from the feudal bonds. Nevertheless, Brugherio saw in 1880 the inauguration of the tramway Cascina Gobba-Vimercate, in 1886 the opening of Canale Villoresi and, in recent decades, the birth of the first factories for the production of silk.

=== 20th century ===
Despite the slight industrialization, in this area it took birth the first trade union movements of Catholic inspiration. In fact the countryside, strongly linked to religion, was hostile to the socialist revendications and approached the Catholic-inspired unions, causing a change of relationship between farmers and landowners. In 1912, with the proclamation of universal male suffrage, by Giovanni Giolitti, the electoral base expanded greatly and it changed the political forces that were under the oligarchy. The years of World War I were administered by mayor Giovanni Santini and Brugherio was always stocked with food supplies, while in the period of the so-called Biennio Rosso (1919-1920) took place violence between the Socialists and the Popular Catholics. The latter lost their absolute majority, due to the loosening of their trade union activities, and the last mayor elected at the polls, Marcello Gatti, had to manage the difficult transition from Liberalism to Fascism. From 1926 to 1943 the town was ruled by the podestà Ercole Balconi. With the fall of Mussolini, Brugherio was the scene of the trade union movements of workers at the Pirelli plant in San Damiano and of resistance movement against the Nazism: this is why a street is named after the last Partisan murdered in town, Luigi Teruzzi.

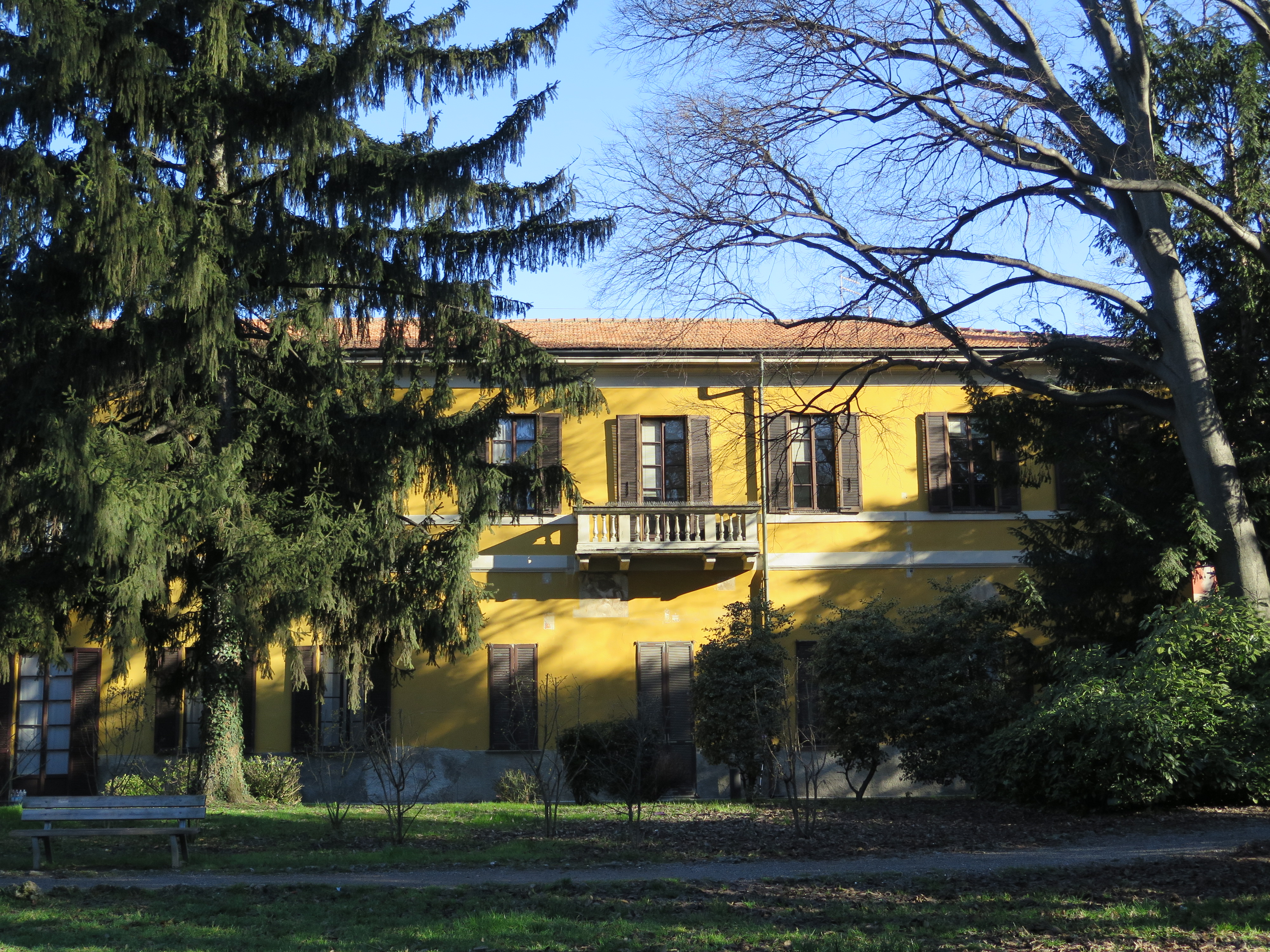
Villa Fiorita

After 1946, Brugherio was ruled by the newly formed Christian Democracy. Under the governments of Pollastri, Meli and Giltri, Brugherio radically changed the features of its territory: new industrial villages were edified by Falck and Pirelli; social housing and new schools were built; the public library was founded in 1960 and it was placed within Palazzo Ghirlanda-Silva; sewerage, electricity and natural gas were extended on the whole area. In those years Brugherio turned into an industrial town (the presence of the Candy company was very important) and it was crowned with the title of city on 27 January 1967, by President of the Republic Giuseppe Saragat.

Between the sixties and the eighties Silvio Berlusconi edified Edilnord district; the municipality bought Villa Fiorita (former nursing home for nervous disease, where the painter Filippo De Pisis had spent several years), to establish its headquarters there; middle school "Leonardo da Vinci" was built and the residential area of Quartiere Ovest (West District) was created. In fact, during the economic boom, many southern people emigrated to the outskirts of big industrial cities and the number of inhabitants increased significantly. In 1993 it was built the church of San Carlo, in the West district, far from the parish church of Saint Bartholomew. Between 1992 and 1994 the municipality purchased and restored the little but important church of Saint Lucius.

== Cityscape ==
=== Architecture ===
==== Villas ====
- Villa Fiorita is the building where the Brugherio Comune's headquarters are housed.
- The Palazzo Ghirlanda-Silva (Ghirlanda Silva Mansion) is a patrician building located in the old town. Built in the first half of the nineteenth century, it now houses the public library.
- Villa Sormani is a baroque building in the village of Moncucco. It was the site of the first Italian public balloon ascent by Paolo Andreani in 1784.
- Villa Brivio is a 19th-century building in the Baraggia district. Owned by the Municipality of Brugherio, it houses residential accommodation and a psychiatric center.
- Villa Somaglia-Balconi is a residential complex located in Brugherio, consisting of a main house and some accompanying buildings, which are separated from the original structure of the villa by Via Marsala, which leads from Moncucco to Carugate.
- Villa Tizzoni Ottolini, is a villa within the architectural complex of Cascina Increa.

==== Churches ====
- Saint Bartholomew is the cathedral and the oldest parish in town. It houses the relics of the three Magi. It is characterised by its relatively high bell tower measuring 36.8 metres (121 ft).
- Saint Lucius, also known as the "little temple of Moncucco" (in Italian: tempietto di San Lucio in Moncucco), is a small church dedicated to Saint Lucius near Villa Sormani. It is one of the most important buildings in Brugherio.
- Saint Ambrose is a small church annexed to the farmhouse that takes its name from it. According to oral and literary sources, in the fourth century, where the church and its farm are now located, there was a villa belonging to the Bishop of Milan, Ambrose. His sister, Marcellina, was consecrated as chaste along with other noble virgins, and Ambrose gave her this land for contemplation and prayer.
- Saint Mary Immaculate is a church annexed to Cascina Increa and next to the entrance of Villa Tizzoni Ottolini. It is dedicated to Virgin Mary, Saint Joseph, Saint Mary Magdalene, Saint Teresa of Ávila.
- Saint Anne is a church in San Damiano, hamlet of Brugherio, dedicated to Saint Anne by Antonio Parravicini and his wife Isabella Blasi.
- Saint Margaret is a 16th-century chapel dedicated to Saint Margaret of Antioch. It is located in Baraggia and adjacent to Villa Brivio, to which it belonged.
- Saint Charles is dedicated to Saint Charles Borromeo and it is the most recent church in Brugherio characterized by modern architecture.
- Saint Paul is a church dedicated to St. Paul the Apostle, located in the south of Brugherio.

==== Historic farmhouses ====
Farmhouses of Brugherio were agricultural structures typical of the Po-Valley in Lombardy, which gave its name to the surrounding areas as well, roughly corresponding to fractional towns.

- Cascina Increa is a farmhouse located on the southeastern border of Brugherio. It enjoys the protection of the Soprintendenze per i Beni Architettonici e Paesaggistici i.e., the Ministry of Cultural Heritage and Activities and Tourism (MiBACT) of its respective province because of its surviving Renaissance architecture. It is located next to Increa Park.
- Cascina Guzzina is a farmhouse located in the southern part of the town, on the border with Cologno Monzese. The name comes from gussetta, which formerly referred to the cocoon of the silkworm, whose breeding was widespread in the area.
- Cascina Sant'Ambrogio, a farm annexed to Saint Ambrose church.

==== Other buildings and monuments ====
- Spinning mill of Baraggia was a mill used for the first phase of silk processing, the reeling.
- Cimitero Storico is the historic cemetery of Brugherio and is find in Viale Lombardia, close to Brugherio city centre.
- Plague crosses were erected after the plague that struck Monza and the near territory in 1576, in four altars used to celebrate religious services.
- War World Memorial, Monument to blood donors and Monument to Peace are monuments of Brugherio dedicated to the fallen during the First World War, to the Blood Donors and to Peace.

=== Green areas ===
- Increa Park is a green area in communal ownership in the south-west part of the town. Inside the park there is a large lake and the Increa Quarry (cava Increa) which gives its name to it.

-Villa Fiorita is a famous park in the city center of brugherio. Inside the park is possible to run, practise sport, relax and enjoy a lunch inside the bar.

== Frazioni ==
- Baraggia is a hamlet of Brugherio that was the separated municipality of Cassina Baraggia until 1866.
- San Damiano is located between the Milan-Bergamo highway and the eastern road ring of Monza.
- Moncucco is located south of Brugherio and it was an autonomous Italian municipality until March 30, 1871.

== Culture ==
=== Festivals ===
There are three festivals in Brugherio. The first is the Festa Paesana di S. Damiano which features street performers and feasts. This is organised by local traders and takes place in June. The second festival is the Festa Delle Occhiate which is celebrated on the second or third Sunday in September. This more traditional festival celebrates farming. The last festival falls on the second Sunday of October. It is called the Festa Patronale della Madonna del SS. Rosario e di S. Bartolomeo. It is celebrated by way of a fair, where local food is eaten and religious celebrations for the Madonna of the Holy Rosary and Saint Bartholomew are performed.

== Education ==
One of the three comprehensive schools in Brugherio is named for local artist Filippo de Pisis.

The second comprehensive school in Brugherio is named Elve Fortis (Elve Fortís de Híeronymis was born in 1920, she taught drawing and art history in high schools. in 1967 she dedicated herself to the design and illustration of children's books, game books, animated books with paper illustrations and educational games.) and is based in Via Nazario Sauro, 135, 20861 Brugherio MB.

The third comprehensive school is named Don Camagni and is based in Via J. e R. Kennedy, 15, 20861, Brugherio MB problems are occurring inside the school so the councilors Mariele Benzi and Roberto Assi have communicated to the Municipality the request to account for what is happening inside the public school "Don Camagni" since on 17 September 2021, problems arose in one of the classrooms of the school. inside the school there was a fall of debris and construction materials.

== Twin towns ==
Brugherio is twinned with:

- Le Puy-en-Velay, France
- Prešov, Slovakia
