= Fumagalli (surname) =

Fumagalli is an Italian surname from western Lombardy, literally translating to 'chicken thief'.

As of 2014, 89.6% of all known bearers of the surname were residents of Italy (frequency 1:1,799), 4.7% of Brazil (1:115,478), 1.8% of Argentina (1:62,399) and 1.2% of Switzerland (1:17,361).

== People with the surname Fumagalli ==
Musical family

- Adolfo Fumagalli (1828–1856), Italian virtuoso pianist and composer
- Carlo Fumagalli (1822–1907), Italian composer, music publisher and music educator
- Disma Fumagalli (1826–1893), Italian composer and music teacher
- Luca Fumagalli (1837–1908), Italian composer, pianist and music educator
- Mario Leone Fumagalli (1869–1936), Italian librettist, actor and baritone
- Polibio Fumagalli (1830–1900), Italian composer, organist and pianist

Other

- Alessandra Fumagalli (born 1998), Italian skeleton racer
- Carlo Fumagalli (born 1996), Italian basketball player
- Corrado Fumagalli (born 1967), Italian television presenter
- Cristiano Fumagalli (born 1984), Italian cyclist
- Ermanno Fumagalli (born 1982), Italian footballer
- Giuliana Fumagalli, Canadian politician
- Ignazio Fumagalli (1778–1842), Italian painter and engraver
- José Fernando Fumagalli (born 1977), Brazilian footballer
- Mariateresa Fumagalli Beonio Brocchieri (born 1933), Italian historian of philosophy
- Michelangelo Fumagalli (1812–1886), Italian painter
- Ombretta Fumagalli Carulli (1944–2021), Italian politician, jurist and academic
- Orazio Fumagalli (1921–2004), Italian sculptor
- Renato Fumagalli (born 1945), Italian singer-songwriter, guitarist and actor
- Troy Fumagalli (born 1995), American football player

== See also ==
- Niso Fumagalli Rose Garden, a public garden in Monza, Italy
