= Naviglio Martesana =

Canal in the Lombardy region of Northern Italy

Coordinates: 45°36′14″N 9°31′43″E

- The Martesana Canal at Cassina de Pecchi
- Interactive map of Naviglio Martesana

Specifications
- Length: 38 km (24 mi)

History
- Date approved: 1443
- Construction began: 1457
- Date completed: 1465

Geography
- Start point: Adda river, near Trezzo sull'Adda
- End point: Milan

The Naviglio della Martesana (Milanese: Nivili de la Martesanna [niˈʋiːri de la marteˈzana]) is a canal in the Lombardy region, Northern Italy. Running from the Adda river, in the vicinity of Trezzo sull'Adda, to Milan, it was also known as Naviglio Piccolo (Lombard: Navijett [naʋiˈjɛt]). It is part of the system of navigli of the Milan area.

Approximately 38 kilometres (24 mi) long, with a substantial section covered over or infilled, its width varies between 9 and 18 metres (30 and 59 ft), while the depth is between one and three metres (3 and 10 ft).

Originally named Naviglio Piccolo, it subsequently changed to Martesana from the name of the county across which it runs.

Along the way it crosses the boundaries of the villages of Trezzo sull'Adda, Vaprio d'Adda, Cassano d'Adda, Inzago, Bellinzago Lombardo, Gessate, Gorgonzola, Bussero, Cassina de' Pecchi, Cernusco sul Naviglio and Vimodrone, and takes the name Martesana from this area (Martesana County was established during the late Roman ages). The canal enters Milan alongside Via Padova until Cassina dei Pom: at the junction with Via Melchiorre Gioia it disappears underground following the route of Via Melchiorre Gioia itself southwards. In the past it would have passed through the Fossa dell'Incoronata and the Laghetto di San Marco to connect with the Fossa Interna (or Inner Ring). Today, after merging with the river Seveso, the underground course becomes the Cavo Redefossi in the vicinity of Porta Nuova, runs under the cerchia dei bastioni to Porta Romana, follows Corso Lodi and Via Emilia, finally ending up in the River Lambro.

== History ==
=== The project and the start of construction ===
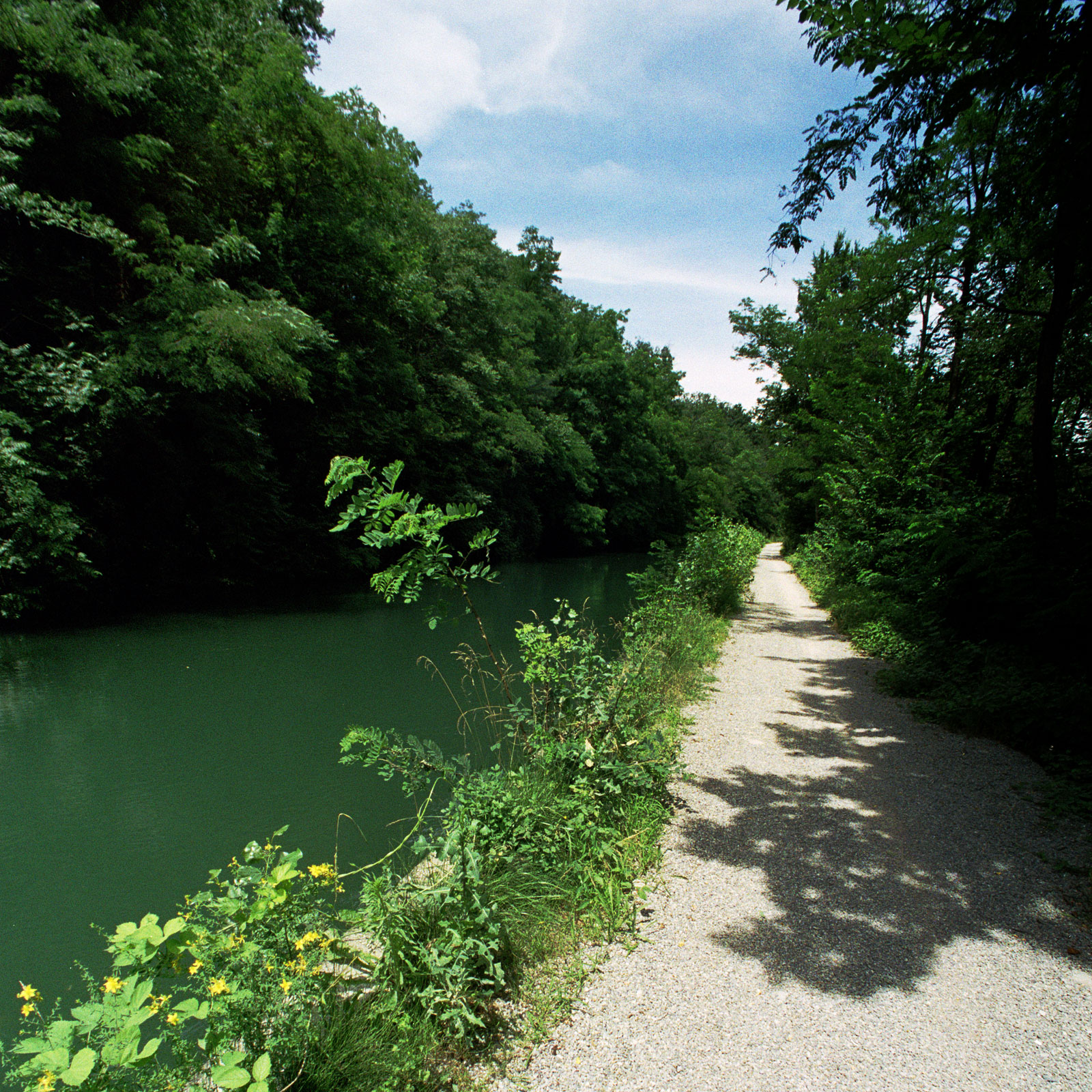
The canal between Vaprio d'Adda and Trezzo sull'Adda. Today the towpath is popular among cyclists.

The history of the canal begins on June 3, 1443, date of a document by Filippo Maria Visconti, Duke of Milan, approving an ambitious project put forward by a group of illustrious Milanese citizens led by Catellano Cotta, the duke's administrator for the salt monopoly. The project aims to deviate the River Adda and thus build a canal for irrigation and to feed up to 16 mill wheels. The design included a water intake positioned just below the castle of Trezzo sull'Adda, where the natural course of the river narrows, therefore producing a current sufficient to guarantee a constant flow of water. The canal was to run alongside the river until Cassano d'Adda, where it would curve away in a south-westerly direction towards Milan, then hug the town walls of Inzago, turn towards Trecella and Melzo, and finally end up in the River Molgora.

Because of the political situation of the time, nothing happened until 1457, when Francesco Sforza's edict, underwritten by Cicco Simonetta, marked the start of design work. The project was seen as being of great public benefit: since the war between Milan and Venice, Sforza had realised the military and economic potential of a navigable canal in an area that, at the time, was considered to be of strategic importance to the dukedom. So he modified the original project, to put it into a wider context giving the city of Milan a water connection to the Rivers Adda and Ticino.

It was initially constructed by the engineer Bertola de Nova (1410–75) and inaugurated in 1465 by Bianca Maria Sforza.

=== Leonardo da Vinci's contribution ===
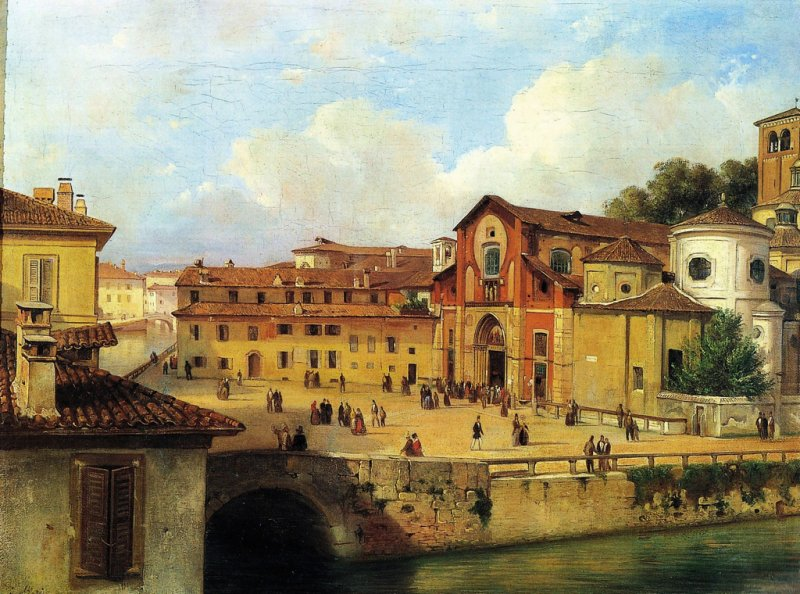
Piazza San Marco on the canal, 1835–40, by Luigi Bisi

Between 1484 and 1500, Leonardo da Vinci was a guest of the Sforza court and during the 19th century was at times credited with the design of the basins and a direct participation in the completion of the Martesana. Today all that is certain is that in the schematic image of Milan in plan and horizontal profile the Martesana is reported by Leonardo as an already completed work, while in a subsequent sheet the drawings and notes relating to the basin of San Marco, which will determine the construction methods of the hydraulic device for the future can be seen.

On the other hand, it is certain that in 1516 Francesco I commissioned Leonardo, on the occasion of his second stay at Ambrosia, to design a direct link between Milan and the Adda upstream of its non-navigable stretch, between Paderno and Trezzo. Leonardo provided two possible solutions: the opening of a new canal which from Paderno would head west crossing the plain before turning south at Milan or, alternatively, a daring project with counterweighted canals, wells and locks in tunnels dug into the rock that overlooks the right bank of the river, where the Paderno canal was later built. But the Sforza dream of connecting Milan directly with Lake Como had to wait almost another three centuries: after many attempts, the difference in height of the Adda between Brivio and Trezzo was overcome by the Naviglio di Paderno only in October 1777.

== Current situation ==
Today it is a popular recreational area, known for its tranquil and traffic free cycling paths.

== Sources ==
- A mention can be found on p. 34–35 of Hadfield's World Canals, 1986. ISBN 0-7153-8555-0.

For an Italian bibliography see the Italian version of this article on the Italian Wikipedia.
