= Farmhouses of Brugherio =

The old farmhouses of Brugherio were agricultural structures typical of the Po Valley in Lombardy, which derived its name from the surrounding areas, roughly corresponding to fractional towns in which Brugherio was divided. The union of the various small rural municipalities in 1866 gave birth to the municipality of Brugherio. Some fragmented towns are still visible, namely: Bindellera, Casecca, Cattoni, Comolli, Dorderio, Guzzina, Increa, Modesta (called also Del Bosco), Moia, Occhiate (with Occhiate's mill), Pareana, San Cristoforo, Sant'Ambrogio, San Paolo and Torazza.

== Architecture ==
Isolated in the countryside (as Sant'Ambrogio, Guzzina and Occhiate) or unified in a rural agglomeration (as Cassina Baraggia and San Damiano), the farms were the core of peasant life. They had closed courts and shared architectural characteristics of farms on the plains north of Milan. In such designs, the yard was intended to functionally link the property, having a central role in the agricultural chain of production (as occurred in Po-valley companies). Around the courtyard, usually four very large buildings are opened: two porches on the ground floor, topped by a railing leading to the residential upper floor; the third belonged to stables and barns; and the fourth was originally made up of small rooms used as latrines. The houses were arranged properly—in the ground floor there was kitchen, pantry, closets and living room. Bedrooms are placed upstairs. At the center of the courtyard, one could find water well.

== Agriculture ==
In Brugherio and its surroundings, agricultural properties were mostly small and divided, apart from a few exceptions, until the Napoleonic era. Polyculture (wheat, maize, beans, potatoes) prevailed, intended mainly for personal consumption rather than sale. The area was known for the production of wine and, from the mid-eighteenth century, mulberry cultivation grew: the mulberry trees, which were customarily planted on the edge of the field, to avoid sacrificing other crops needed to feed silkworms, were given by the owner to the tenant farmers to labour them together. Women and children were in charge of breeding silkworms. The silkworm boom saw the construction of several mills, the first of which were located in Baraggia and Moncucco.

== Farmhouses ==
=== Bindellera ===
It was built in 1761 and it was a property of Viganone, a tape-seller. It had a big room at the ground floor where tuns were placed.

Cassina nuova o del bindellaro, perché appartenente al signor Viganone venditore di nastri, di Monza. Iniziata nel 1761. Ha camerone inferiore che serve alla tinara, un torchietto a stanghe per il vino, due altre stanze terrene cò suoi superiori, stalla, cassina, pozzo. Pertiche 200.

— don Paolo Antonio De Petri, Cronaca parrocchiale, 1794

The farm is located between viale Lombardia and the A4 motorway. It is still used for agricultural activities, but it is in bad condition.

=== Casecca ===
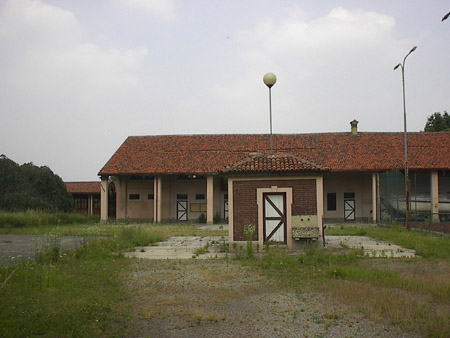
Casecca

Ca secca, as it was once called to emphasize the arid nature of the surrounding land, is located in the north-west of Brugherio, lapped by the irrigation ditch Manganella. It was property of the friars of the Passion of Milan, who built a church dedicated to St. Magdalene, until the end of 1700, and then it was moved to Pecchio Ghiringhelli's family. Recently it hosted the headquarters of the sports center La mongolfiera of GIVIDI club, closed in 2013.

Al crocicchio di Torrazza, Casasecia, con Crocifisso di Bronzo sopra croce di ferro. Un retto e ameno stradone da questo punto conduce alla strada provinciale di Vimercate, all'angolo formato dalle case di Moncucco. L'oratorio è dedicato a S. Maddalena. Vi è il torchio per il vino. Le 200 pertiche di prati verdeggianti sono bagnate dalla roggia Manganella. Abitano 46 persone. Abbondante è la raccolta di gallette, scuola del vicinato.

— don Paolo Antonio De Petri, Cronaca parrocchiale, 1794

It was known for the production of clogs, which were sold at Monza, the town of which the municipality was a member until 1866, when it was annexed to Brugherio. Of the original architectural structure remains only the wing of the portico overlooking Via Casecca, which, although much restored, retains the characteristic features of the Lombard farmhouse.

=== Dorderio ===
During the second half of the eighteenth century Dorderio was an independent town that was annexed to the municipality of Moncucco. It belonged to the Marquises Carpani, who possessed, in addition to the farm, a "aratorio used as furnace" and the surrounding grounds.

De' Conti Carpani antichi. Detta anche cassina de cavalloni perché ai lati della porta sono dipinti in figura gigantesca due cavaglieri cò loro fantaccini o scudieri. Su pertiche 670 abitano 50 persone.

— don Paolo Antonio De Petri, Cronaca parrocchiale, 1794

In 1800 the property passed to Butti's family, who built next to the farmhouse a "holiday home", which still preserves valuable frescoes painted on the facade, the inside ones are very scarred.

=== Guzzina ===
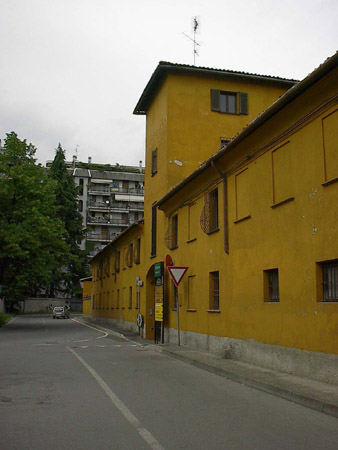
Guzzina

The farm Guzzina, in the south area of Brugherio and opposite the district Edilnord and bordering Cologno Monzese, once stood isolated in the rural town of Moncucco. Its name comes from gussetta, referret to failed cocoons, testimony of the wide spread of sericulture in these places. In addition to the breeding of silkworms, the farm was known since the eighteenth century for the production of wine. The Guzzina is a complex of buildings that includes, within the town walls plastered with intense yellow, some agricultural courts, a villa owned by Count Venino and a private chapel dedicated to St. Andrew at the beginning, then to Santa Maria degli Angeli and finally to the Magi. Both the villa and the church date back to 1500.

Appartenuta alla famiglia Alfieri e poi ai De Capitanei di Vimercate. Su mille pertiche vivono 103 persone. Li fondi della cassina sono li meglio coltivati, fertili di vino perché don Giuseppe Vimercati passa per lo più esperto agricoltore del vicinato.

— don Paolo Antonio De Petri, Cronaca parrocchiale, 1794

=== Increa ===
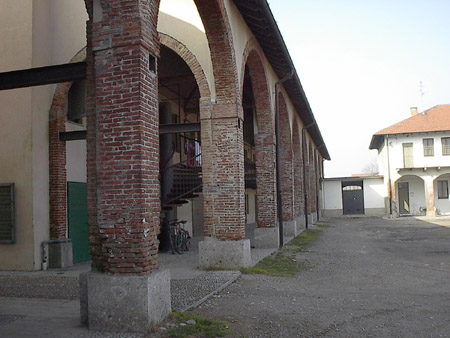
Increa

The farm in Cré (Increa) is very old, dating back at least to the twelfth century and are mentioned among the farms that became part of the parish of St. Bartholomew in 1578. It has always been part of the parish of Gorgonzola, in the municipality of Cernusco Asinario. In 1871 it was aggregated to the municipality of Brugherio, which was formed in 1866. Until that year was the property of Count Carlo Litta, then of the Count Zumenzu. It is passed to Ottolini and Tizzoni's families and finally to Robbiani's, from who the current inhabitants purchased it. The name comes from crea, clay, which could refer to the nature of the surrounding land, or the presence in the area of an old brick kiln. The complex, a rare surviving example of folk architecture of the Renaissance, also includes villa Tizzoni Ottolini and the small church of Saint Mary Immaculate. It is in the countryside between Brugherio and Cernusco sul Naviglio, near the ring road east of Milan and to the park Increa. The planimetry has U-shape: the main structure consists of a portico with five columns topped by a wrought iron balcony. To the left of the entrance there is the small oratory of 1691, known as the church of Santa Maria Immacolata, while on the back there are traces of a large garden which has now disappeared. The cottages and barns have been restored by the municipality of Brugherio, who turned them into housing. The renovation was carried out respecting the original architecture of the farm, protected by the Superintendence for Architectural Heritage and Landscape.

=== Modesta o Del Bosco ===
Cascina Modesta is located on the eastern border of Brugherio, not far from the Cascina Sant'Ambrogio. It was built in the nineteenth century and took its name from the first owner, Brenna modesta widow Vismara, although some say the adjective should instead be referred to the original architectural structure of rural, virtuous or to the character of its inhabitants; so modesta should refear to the poor condition of the inhabitants. It is also called Del Bosco because it is located on the edge of the only large wooded area of Brugherio, known as Boscone and formerly known for its abundance of game. It is the only farm where there are still fully agricultural lands which are all cultivated.

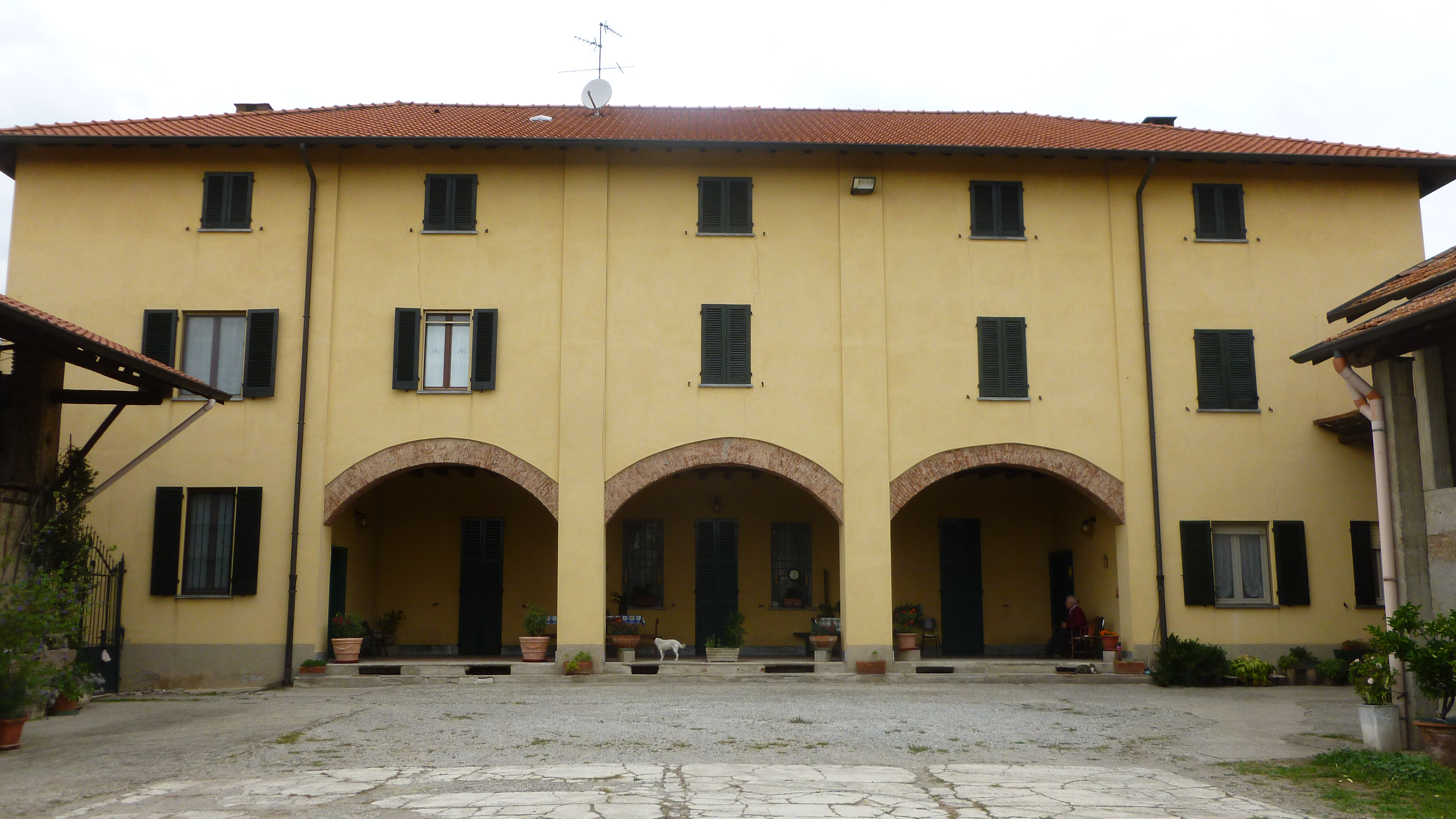
Modesta

=== Moia ===
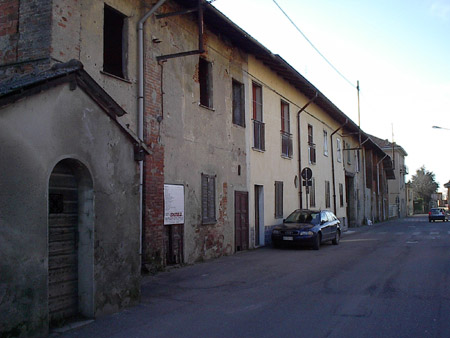
Moia

In the eighteenth century Cassina della Moglia was included in the feud of Durini of Monza. The property then passed to the counts Andreani-Sormani, in the municipality of Moncucco. Since 1866 it is part of the territory of Brugherio and it is located in the north, on the border with Monza. It seems that its name derives from the surname of a family of pharmacists, who had lived there since the sixteenth century.

Gli speziali Moja la possedevano, passata poi ai Durini. Al centro il pozzo. Contiene 5 famiglie, cioè un massaro, due pigionanti, un falegname e il camparo dell'acqua. Tra grandi e piccoli, teste 43, su 400 pertiche irrigate dalla roggia Manganella sorta dal Lambro.

— don Paolo Antonio De Petri, Cronaca parrocchiale, 1794

Historical chronicles of the early years of the twentieth century documents in Cascina Moia the presence of a furnace that made the soil particularly clayey. Although in poor condition, it retains the classic appearance of the Lombard farmhouse, with a well in the center of the court bordered by rustic barns.

=== Occhiate ===
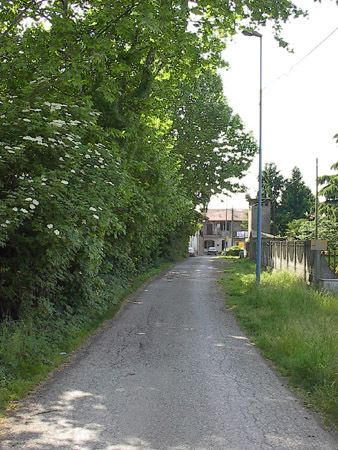
Occhiate

Con antichissimo mulino. Occhiate detto anche Oclave e Octavo, come da menzione nel 853. In questo luogo era stato eretto uno spedale dei poveri e dei pellegrini sotto l'amministrazione del monastero di S. Ambrogio e del monastero Maggiore di Milano. Occhiate è pure menzionato nel testamento dell'arcivescovo Ariberto d'Antiniano nel 1045, che lascia la corte alla chiesa di S. Giovanni di Monza. La cassina è aperta. Vi abita oltre al mulinaro un massaro e un pigionante, in tutto 29 persone.

— don Paolo Antonio De Petri, Cronaca parrocchiale, 1794

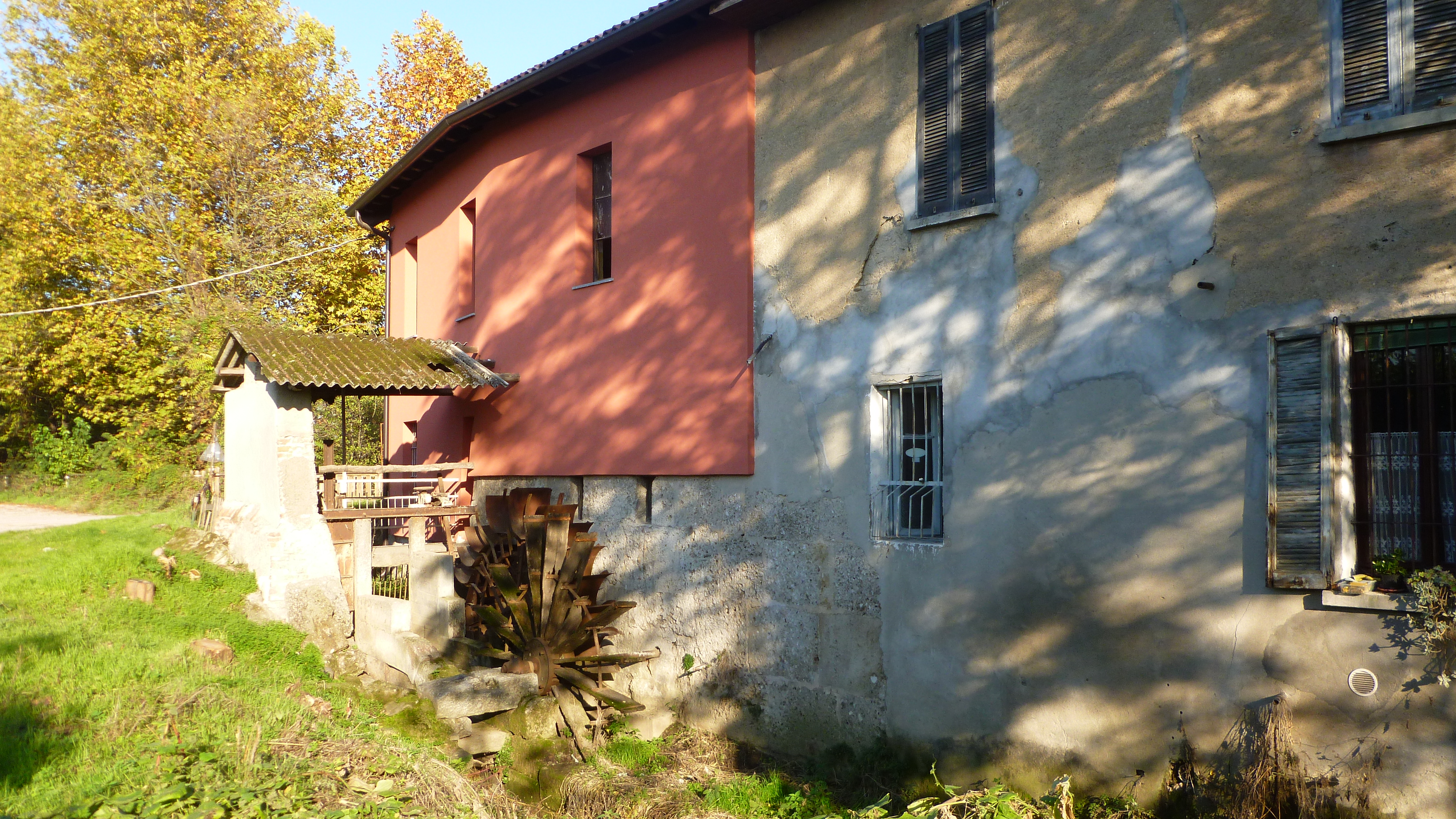
Wheat in Occhiate

After Sant'Ambrogio, Aeclanum is the oldest farm in Brugherio, following Cascina Sant'Ambrogio. It stood in the place known Octavum, the name is due to the fact that it was at the eighth mile of road leading from Milan to Monza. Now that area is situated in the north-west of Brugherio, near the border with Cologno Monzese. The farm was managed by the farmers, that obtained it from the monks of Saint Ambrose church, to make it a place of hospitality for the poor and pilgrims. The monks themselves with the fruits from the leasing and processing land of glances, handed out annually to the poor fifty bushels of wheat and ten amphorae of wine. Later the property passed to the church of Monza. In 1862 it became part of the municipality of Moncucco and in 1866 to the one of Brugherio. The farm is near the banks of the Lambro and has an ancient wheat, with two wheels (a wooden and a metal ones) operated by the Molinara irrigation ditch. The original structure was formed by pillars, wall bricks and wooden beams. Over the years the building has been extended up to the present structure. The mill is still in good condition and it is used to illustrate activities for educational purposes.

=== Pareana ===
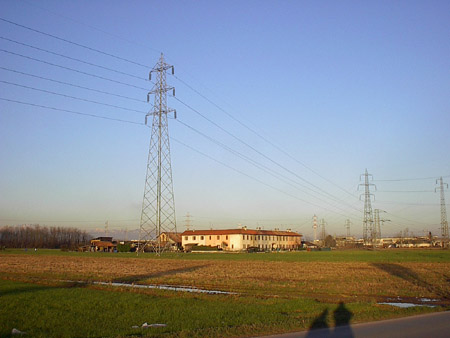
Pareana

Cascina Pareana is located near the border with Carugate, in the territory that was part of Cassina Baraggia. It first belonged to the Counts Durini, then to Marquises Brivio (also owners of the nearby villa), who still has it. It was built in 1730. Although split between different tenants, the original structure is fairly well preserved, with the well and the wood oven that arise in their ancient form.

...dei conti Durini, è di pertiche 400. Sulla casa è dipinta una immagine di Gesù Bambino adorato dai Magi. E' abitata da una famiglia di massaro di 28 persone. E' rinomata per l'abbondante vino che produce.

— don Paolo Antonio De Petri, Cronaca parrocchiale, 1794

=== San Cristoforo ===
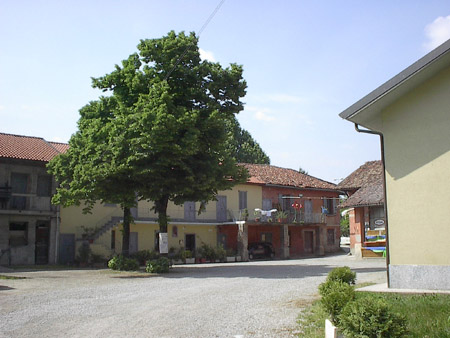
San Cristoforo

It takes name from a small church dedicated to St. Christopher that stood beside it in the ninth century, when the territory was part of the town called Ottavo, because it was at the eighth mile of road leading from Milan to Monza. The church was listed among the assets owned by the Cathedral of Monza and had been built "to remind travelers of then and now". It was demolished in December 1995. The farm, which is located in the north-west of Brugherio, dates back at least to the '500 and in 1751 was surveyed by the Teresian cadastre as "a house of a farmer called San Cristoforo", that had been property before the accounts Serbelloni, then of the accounts Alari of Milan.

Nel 1790, con la Torrazza, fu acquistata dal conte Gioan- Mario Andreani, decurione della città di Milano e ciambellano. Li fondi, di cinquecento pertiche, sono forti ed ottimi, in parte irrigati dai coli della Bocca Lupa, dopo che le acque hanno servito ai prati della Cassinazza spettante ai regi Cappellani di S. Giovanni di Monza. La cascina è abitata dal più grosso massaro della parrocchia di Brugherio la cui famiglia è composta da 42 persone. In questa cascina c'è un Oratorio di S. Cristoforo (nominato nella bolla di Alessandro III, del 1169, tra le chiese e le cappelle dipendenti da S. Giovanni di Monza). Sopra la porta è dipinto un Crocefisso con la Vergine Maria e S. Giovanni, opera probabilmente di uno dei Luini.

— don Paolo Antonio De Petri, Cronaca parrocchiale, 1794

=== Sant'Ambrogio ===
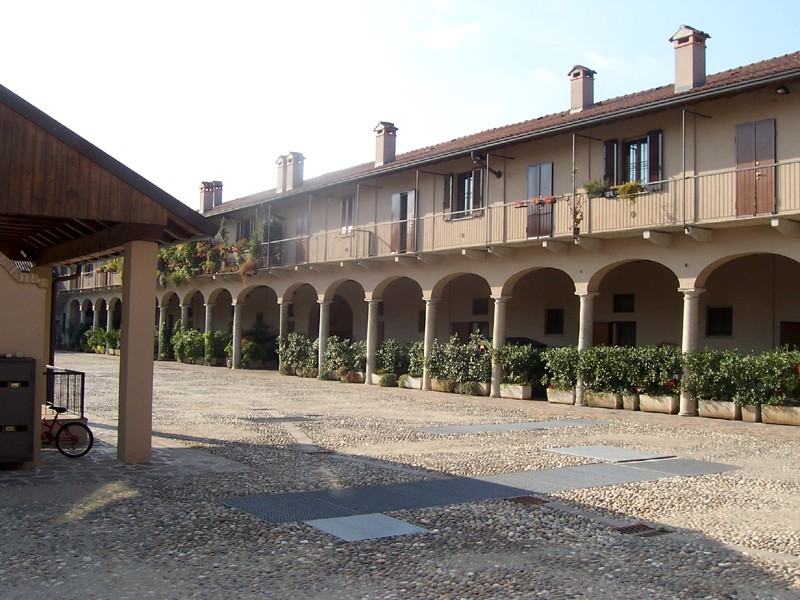
Sant'Ambrogio

Cascina Sant'Ambrogio is the oldest farm in Brugherio. It is next to the church Saint Ambrose, with which it shared the various owners. It is located in Via Dei Mille, which once was in open countryside in the town of Cassina Baraggia, but located sull'Itinerarium burdigalense. Commissioned by the bishop of Milan Ambrose as a summer residence, at his death it was ceded to the monastery of Saint Ambrose with usufruct to his sister Marcellina, who retired to the cloistered life. Villa, monastery, then mansion and finally farmhouse, it was restored (along oratory annex) in 1953, for will of the family Cavajoni, that bought the complex after the religious orders' Napoleonic suppression. The last renovation was done in 1995 by a special purpose company by four local businessmen, who used the apartment buildings preserving and recovering as much as possible of the original architectural elements.

=== Torazza ===
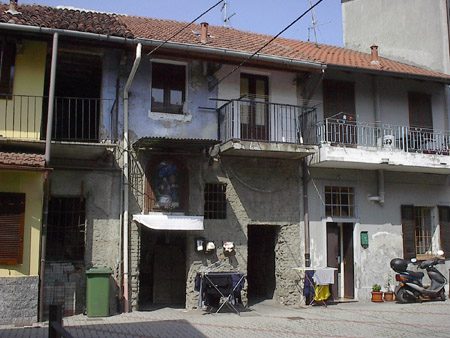
Torazza

Before the establishment of the municipality of Brugherio, in 1866, the town Torrazza belonged to Monza. Since the sixteenth century, the farm was isolated in the middle of the countryside owned by several noble families of Milan (first Marino, then Alari finally the Sormani-Andreani) and was inhabited exclusively by stewards and laborers who cultivated the land.

Torrazza (ampliata nel 1790) è il più bello e grandioso cassinaggio del vicinato. Sul muro una divota Vergine Immacolata. Abitano 4 massari, 3 pigionanti: in tutto 64 persone.

— don Paolo Antonio De Petri, Cronaca parrocchiale, 1794

With the passing of time the territory is urbanized and the area has been transformed into a residential neighborhood, changing the character of the farmhouse. In 1963 it was built some features townhouses, while stables and barns have been turned into garages.

== Bibliography ==
- Luigi Ghezzi; Raffaele Bagnoli. La cascina Sant'Ambrogio di Brugherio (in Italian). Milano: Tipografia delle missioni.
- Luciana Tribuzio Zotti (1986). Brugherio nei documenti (in Italian). Brugherio: Musicografia Lombarda.
- Luciana Tribuzio Zotti (1987). Brugherio: luoghi memorabili (in Italian). Brugherio: Parole nuove.
- Brugherio: la nostra gente (in Italian). Brugherio: Movimento Terza Età.
- Manuela Mancini (1996). Brugherio: presente e passato (in Italian). Milano: Swan.
- Brugherio: i suoi luoghi, la sua storia: 225. anniversario del primo volo italiano in mongolfiera con uomini a bordo (in Italian). Brugherio: Comune di Brugherio. 2009.

== See also ==
- Cascina Increa
- Cascina Sant'Ambrogio
