= Saint Ambrose, Brugherio =

Church in Brugherio, Italy

Coordinates: 45.54674°N 9.31535°E

Saint Ambrose (Chiesetta di Sant'Ambrogio)
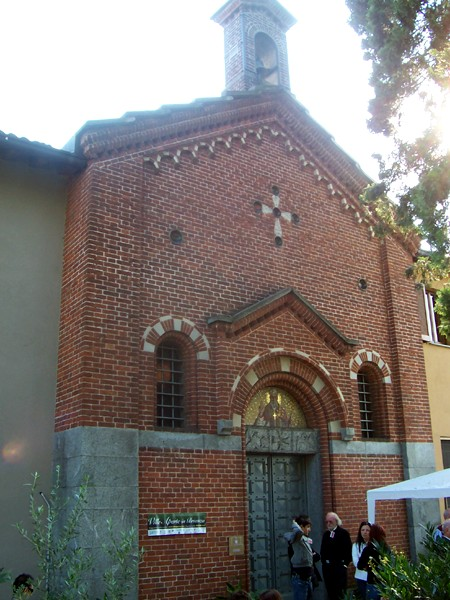
- Exterior view of the church

Religion
- Affiliation: Roman Catholic
- Province: Monza and Brianza
- Region: Lombardy
- Patron: Saint Ambrose
- Status: Church

Location
- Municipality: Brugherio
- State: Italy

Architecture
- Type: Church
- Style: Neoromanesque, Gothic

Saint Ambrose (Italian: Chiesetta di Sant'Ambrogio) is a small church which is an annex to the farmhouse that takes its name from it, in Brugherio, Italy.

== History ==
=== Saint Ambrose and Saint Marcellina ===
==== The coenobium and the relics ====
According to oral and literary sources, in the fourth century, where the church and its farm are now located, there was a villa belonging to the Bishop of Milan, Ambrose. His sister, Marcellina, was consecrated as chaste along with other noble virgins, and Ambrose gave her this land for contemplation and prayer. Ambrose used to retire here to meditate and write. In addition, together with his sister he spread the Christian faith in country villages (pagus in Latin).

Ambrose gave his sister a part of the relics of the three Magi who had been brought to Milan as a gift from the Holy Roman Emperor Frederick I to Bishop Eustorgio. The relics were preserved for centuries and then "found" by Cardinal Federico Borromeo, who moved them to the parish church.

=== 16th - 17th century ===
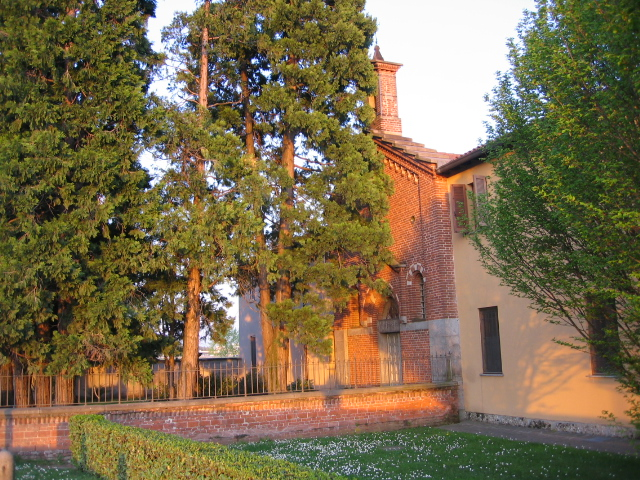
Church of Saint Ambrose

The religious complex was home to various religious orders: the Benedictines, the Augustinians and the Humiliati. On the site of the present church there was another built during the twelfth century. The Humiliati in 1539 moved to the monastery of Saint Catherine Chiusa of Milano, while maintaining ownership of the monastery. Among the assets of the monastic complex there was a chapel used for prayer mentioned by Cardinal Federico in the report of the pastoral visit of 1596. In it, he describes the precarious architectural state (which prompted a series of restorations undertaken until 1621), and the wealth of the church utensils. The church appears in the maps of the Teresian Cadastre of 1763, including a building located along the road to Carugate.

=== 19th century ===
After the suppression of the monastic orders by Napoleon Bonaparte, the farmhouse and church were sold to various landowners. In 1886 the church was restored and some frescoes of the fourteenth century were found. They depict Saint Ambrose among his brothers Satyr and Marcellina with the holy martyrs Sebastian and Pope Fabian.

=== 20th century ===
On the occasion of the 1600th anniversary of the velatio of Marcellina, in 1953 the owners of the farm, lords Cavajoni-Bologona, decided to renovate the frescoes and build the lunette on the building's facade. On October 31, Monsignor Ennio Bernasconi, mitred abbot of St. Ambrose of Milan, praised not only Marcellina and his brothers but also the owners responsible for the restoration. Minor restorations were also executed in 1959. Since 2009, the church and the homonymous farmhouse were included in the project "Ville Aperte", a Monza and Brianza province project promote the arts.

== Architecture and art ==
=== The facade after 1886 ===
The current appearance of the facade dates back to an 1886 restructuring commissioned by the owner, Ercole Gnecchi. It was rebuilt in brick in the style of Lombardy, in reference to the Basilica of Saint Ambrose in Milan, and is divided by a cornice. The top has a central lunette depicting the blessing of Saint Ambrose, surrounded by a round arch, and next to it there are two arched windows. This section is surmounted by a pediment, and above it there is a small tower. The bottom presents a splayed portal. The lintel is the original one, and depicts an early Christian greek cross with the symbols of the evangelists, Mark and John.

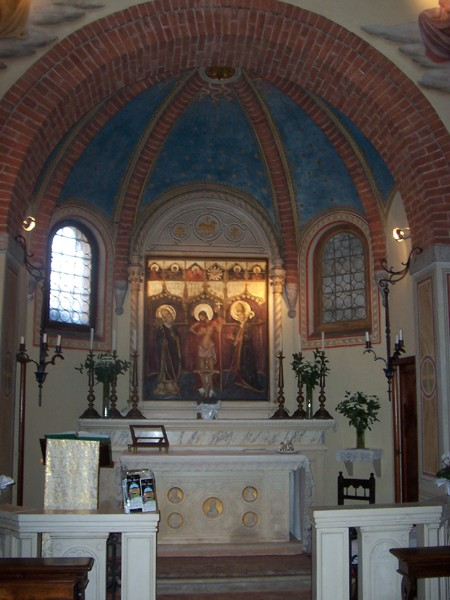
Interior of the church

=== Interior ===
The church is characterized by a small nave with apse, covered by a gable in turn supported by wooden trusses with decorated warping. The flooring is made of terracotta brick, while the walls are painted in a light colored parchment, itself decorated with polychrome socket boxes. Preceding the altar there are a round arch and a tympanum above it, which depicts two angels in prayer. In the tympanum there is an oval inside which is enclosed a radial cross termed Salus Mundi. The vault of the presbytery is decorated with a blue sky with gold stars. The presbytery contains an altar made of stone, which is separated from the rest of the church by a balustrade in gothic style and in the same material.

=== Frescoes and paintings ===
==== 1953 restoration ====
During the restoration in 1953, the team led by Professor Franco Milani found some frescoes dating to the fifteenth century. On the left wall there are depictions of Pope Fabian and Saint Sebastian, while on the right side there are depictions of Saint Ambrose, Marcellina and Satyr. These frescoes were damaged by moisture and covered with layers of lime. The damage was also observed to undermine the pilaster. After restoration the frescoes were partly preserved. Classic iconographic representations of Saint Ambrose are of an old man, but in this church's frescoes both the bishop and Saint Sebastian are represented as young people. The frescoes have a gothic style that also characterizes the altarpiece. The author was probably influenced by artistic trends of northern Europe as well as by Giotto.

== See also ==
- Church of Saint Bartholomew
- Cascina Sant'Ambrogio

== Bibliography ==
- Bernasconi, Ennio (1959). Nella villa di campagna di S. Marcellina. Discorsi di Mons. Ennio Bernasconi Abbate Mitrato di S. Ambrogio nell'Oratorio di Sant'Ambrio a Brugherio (in Italian).
- Biraghi, Luigi (1867). Vita di Santa Marcellina (in Italian).
- Brugherio: geografia, storia ed economia (in Italian).
- Ghezzi, Luigi; Bagnoli, Raffaele (1942). La Cascina Sant'Ambrogio di Brugherio (in Italian). Milano: Tipografia delle Mission.
- Movimento Terza Età (1992). Brugherio. La nostra gente (in Italian). Brugherio.
- Petrarca, Francesco. De vita solitaria (in Italian). Vol. II. pp. 430–433. in Martellotti, Guido; Ricci, Pier Giorgio; Carrara, Enrico (1995). Francesco Petrarca - Prose (in Italian). Milano - Napoli: Riccardo Ricciardi Editore.
- Tribuzio, Zotti (1989). Brugherio. Luoghi memorabili (in Italian). Brugherio: Edizioni Parole Nuove.
- Tribuzio Zotti, Luciana; Magni, Giuseppe (2012). Una città nel segno dei Magi: Brugherio 1613-2013 (in Italian). Brugherio: Associazione Kairòs.
- Sibilla, Anna Maria. La Cascina Sant'Ambrogio (in Italian).
- Suore Marcelline (2013). Velatio di Santa Marcellina (in Italian). Milano: Edizioni Marcelline.
