= Legnani =

Legnani is an Italian surname. Notable people with the surname include:

- Antonio Legnani (1888−1943), Italian admiral
- Luca Legnani (born 1980), Italian film producer
- Lucas Legnani (born 1978), Argentine ten-pin bowler
- Luigi Legnani (1790−1877), Italian guitarist and composer
- Pierina Legnani (1863−1923), Italian ballerina
- Stefano Maria Legnani (1660–1715), Italian painter of the Baroque period, also called Legnanino to distinguish him from his father
- Ernesta Legnani Bisi (1788–1859), Italian painter and engraver

== See also ==
- Legnini, a similar surname
- Palazzo Legnani Pizzardo, Bologna
- Villa Sioli Legnani, Bussero
