= Pessano con Bornago =

Pessano con Bornago Pessan con Bornagh (Lombard)
- Comune
- Comune di Pessano con Bornago
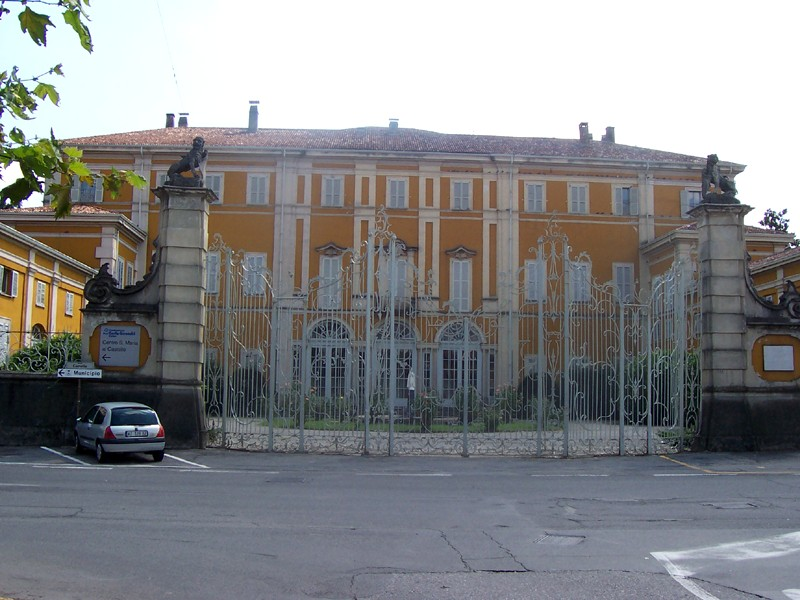

- Location within Italy Location within Lombardy
- Coordinates: 45°33′N 9°23′E
- Country: Italy
- Region: Lombardy
- Metropolitan city: Milan (MI)

Government
  - Mayor: Alberto Villa

Area
  - Total: 6.6 km^{2} (2.5 sq mi)
- Elevation: 148 m (486 ft)

Population (30 June 2017)
  - Total: 9,041
  - Density: 1,400/km^{2} (3,500/sq mi)
- Demonym(s): Pessanesi, Bornaghesi
- Time zone: UTC+1 (CET)
  - Summer (DST): UTC+2 (CEST)
- Postal code: 20060
- Dialing code: 02
- Website: Official website

Pessano con Bornago (Milanese: Pessan con Bornagh [peˈsãː kũ burˈnaːk]) is a comune (municipality) in the Metropolitan City of Milan in the Italian region Lombardy, located about 20 kilometres (12 mi) northeast of Milan, in an area called Martesana.

Pessano con Bornago borders the following municipalities: Cambiago, Caponago, Gessate, Carugate, Gorgonzola, Bussero.
