= Cascina Sant'Ambrogio =

Coordinates: 45°32′48.55″N 9°18′53.77″E

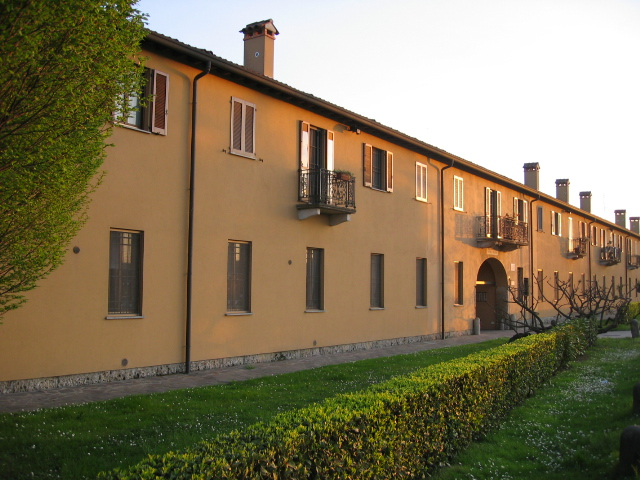

General information
- Type: Farmhouse
- Location: Via dei Mille, 110, Brugherio, Italy
- Construction started: 6th century
- Completed: 19th century

Cascina Sant'Ambrogio is the oldest among the farmhouses in Brugherio, Italy. It is annexed to Saint Ambrose Church from which it takes its name.

== History ==
=== The coenobium of Saint Marcellina ===
During the fourth century, Via dei Mille was a portion of Via Burdigalense. Historians speculate that the location of Brugherio was important for the passage of goods from Aquileia to the river of Fluvium Frigidum in the stop of Mansio Fluvio Frigidum Milia XII. The commercial importance of this land for the Pars Occidentalis Roman Empire alludes as to the presence of buildings and property connected to Monza and Milan. In fact, at the end of the fourth century the area belonged to the Ambrose, Bishop of Milan. He donated the property and the convent to his sister Marcellina, who had chosen to retire to contemplative life. He also gave her part of the relics of the Three Magi kept in the Basilica of Sant'Eustorgio in Milan. The Bishop of Milan used to retire in the farmhouse for contemplation and prayer.

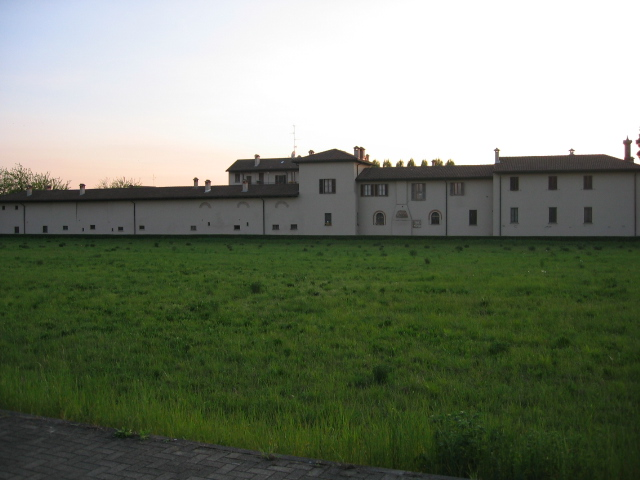
Cascina Sant'Ambrogio

=== Low-Middle Ages ===
The area was occupied by a monastery of the Benedictine nuns in 1099. The presence of monasteries linked to the orders of the Cluniac Reforms was a feature of the Lombardy region. Between the twelfth and fourteenth centuries, the monastery and its territories went to other religious orders (including Humiliatis). Up to 1362 it was still nuns who kept the administration of land assets after the transfer in the monastery of Saint Bartolo in Rancate.

=== Between 14th century and 19th century ===
In 1539 the Humiliatis were moved to the monastery of Saint Catherine alla Chiusa of Milan by Pope Paul III. In 1578 and then 1596 the monastery was visited by Saint Charles Borromeo and Federigo Borromeo. They discovered the holy relics that were recognized as those of the Magi. In 1613 they were transferred to the parish church of Saint Bartholomew. The land's cultivation was entrusted to the settlers living in the monastery by the nuns of Saint Catherine. The farm was cited in 1640 by Pope Urban VIII and in the land register of Charles VI in 1720. The grounds of the monastery increased to 704 poles at the death of the Marquis Omodeo Baraggia, who donated them to the nuns in 1730. The absence of the nuns and the transfer of the relics of the Magi marked the beginning of the farm's decline until the suppression of monastic orders by Napoleon.

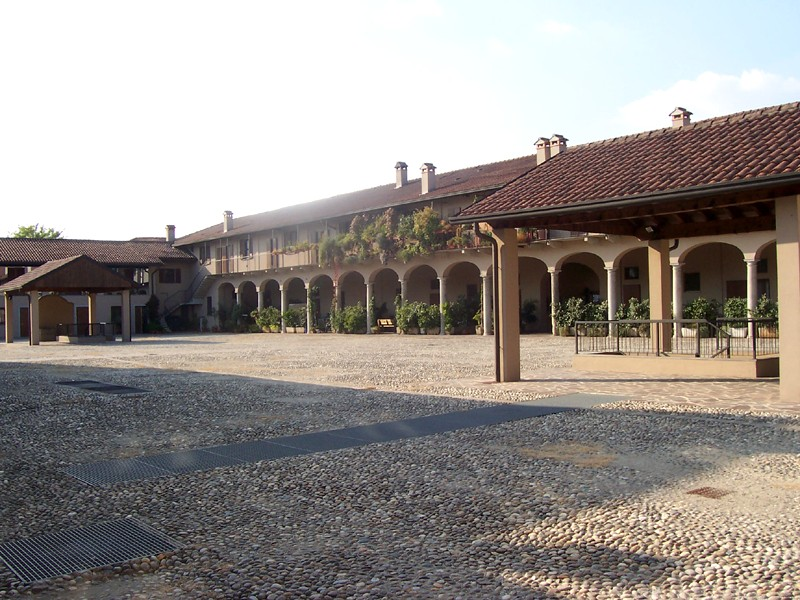
Interior of the farmhouse

In 1804 the counts of Ottolini bought the farm. It was given to Elizabeth Napollon after the death of her husband, count Giulio Ottolini. In 1844 it came under the control of Giuseppe Rizzi. He restored the farm and its agricultural activities, poorly managed by the Napollon widow. In 1863, the farm passed to his wife, Giuseppina Rogier, who sold it in 1868 to Alessandro Gilardi. In 1874, the property passed to his various discendens until 1883, when it was sold to Ercole Gnecchi, brother of Francesco Gnecchi, who restored the farmhouse and the church dedicated to Saint Ambrose.

=== The 20th century ===
In 1904 the property was transferred to the Dubini family, a family of Milanese industrialists which included Giuseppe, the mayor of Brugherio. In 1925 it was passed on to the Cavajoni-Bologna family, that radically restored the farmhouse and church in 1952, on the anniversary of the monastic consecration of Marcellina. These were the last owners of the farm that now houses residences.

== Architecture and art ==
Having been built in the fourth century, the structure of the farm is not the original one due to posterior restructuring work. The interior has a U-shaped lock with a long porch, composed by eighteen granite arcades, reminiscent of the cloister. To the east, near the church, one can find the original complex which was enlarged over the centuries. There was a room decorated with frescoes depicting the Three Magi, meant to preserve the relics. In 1844 this room was used as a mill. The façade facing Via dei Mille is decorated with wrought-iron balconies and was connected with a leafy avenue to the city center.

== See also ==
- Church of Saint Bartholomew
- Church of Saint Ambrose

== Bibliography ==
- Bernasconi, Ennio (1953). Nella villa di campagna di S. Marcellina. Discorsi di Mons. Ennio Bernasconi Abbate Mitrato di S. Ambrogio nell'Oratorio di Sant'Ambrogio a Brugherio (in Italian).
- Capsoni, Severino (1782). Memorie istoriche della regia città di Pavia e suo territorio antico e moderno (in Italian). Vol. I. Pavia: Stamperia del R.I. Monistero di S. Salvatore.
- P. Geyer (1898). Itinera Hierosolymitana. Saeculi IIII-VIII. Corpus scriptorum ecclesiasticorum latinorum (in Latin). Vol. XXXVIII. F. Tempsky.
- Ghezzi, Luigi; Bagnoli, Raffaele (1942). La Cascina Sant'Ambrogio di Brugherio (in Italian).
- Parise, Nicola (2001). Francesco Gnecchi Ruscone (in Italian). Vol. 57. Treccani.
- Pignatelli, Luigi (1968). Luigi Biraghi (in Italian). Vol. 10. Treccani.
- Porfidio, Vicky (2009). Brugherio: i suoi luoghi, la sua storia (in Italian). Brugherio: Comune di Brugherio.
- Sibilla, Anna Maria. La Cascina Sant'Ambrogio (in Italian).
- Tribuzio Zotti, Luciana; Magni, Giuseppe (2013). Una città nel segno dei Magi : Brugherio 1613-2013 (in Italian). Brugherio: Associazione Kairòs.
- Movimento Terza Età (1992). Brugherio, la nostra gente (in Italian). Brugherio: Comune di Brugherio.
