= Cambiago =

Cambiago Cambiagh (Lombard)
- Comune
- Comune di Cambiago
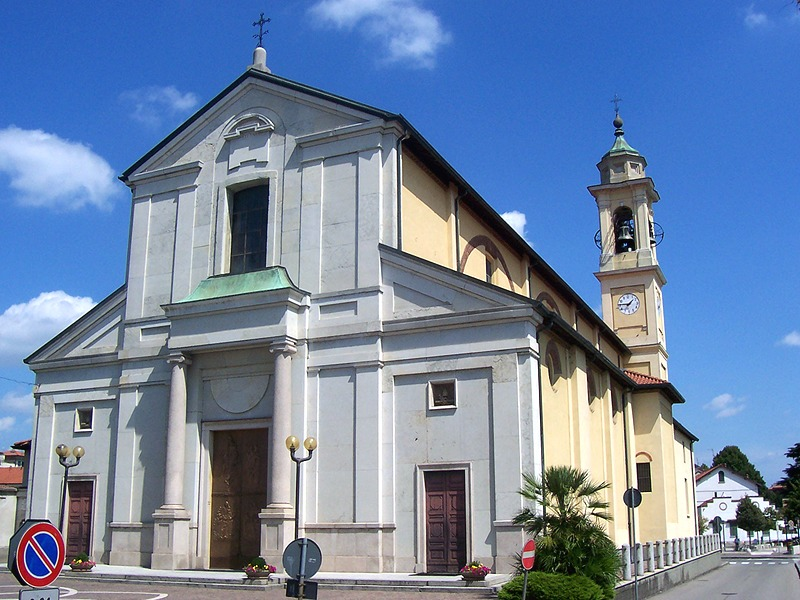

- Coat of arms

- Location within Italy Location within Lombardy
- Coordinates: 45°34′N 9°25′E
- Country: Italy
- Region: Lombardy
- Metropolitan city: Milan (MI)
- Frazioni: Torrazza dei Mandelli

Government
  - Mayor: Silvano Brambilla

Area
  - Total: 7.3 km^{2} (2.8 sq mi)
- Elevation: 158 m (518 ft)

Population (31 December 2014)
  - Total: 6,805
  - Density: 930/km^{2} (2,400/sq mi)
- Demonym: Cambiaghesi
- Time zone: UTC+1 (CET)
  - Summer (DST): UTC+2 (CEST)
- Postal code: 20040
- Dialing code: 02
- Patron saint: San Zenone
- Website: Official website

Cambiago (Lombard: Cambiagh [kãˈbjaːk]) is a comune (municipality) in the Metropolitan City of Milan in the Italian region Lombardy, located about 20 kilometres (12 mi) northeast of Milan.

Cambiago borders the following municipalities: Basiano, Cavenago di Brianza, Agrate Brianza, Masate, Caponago, Gessate, Pessano con Bornago.

The headquarters of high-end road-racing bicycle manufacturer Colnago is located in Cambiago.
