= Legnini =

Legnini is an Italian surname. Notable people with the surname include:

- Éric Legnini (born 1970), Belgian pianist
- Giovanni Legnini (born 1959), Italian lawyer and politician

== See also ==
- Legnani, similar surname
