= Masate =

Masate Masàa (Lombard)
- Comune
- Comune di Masate
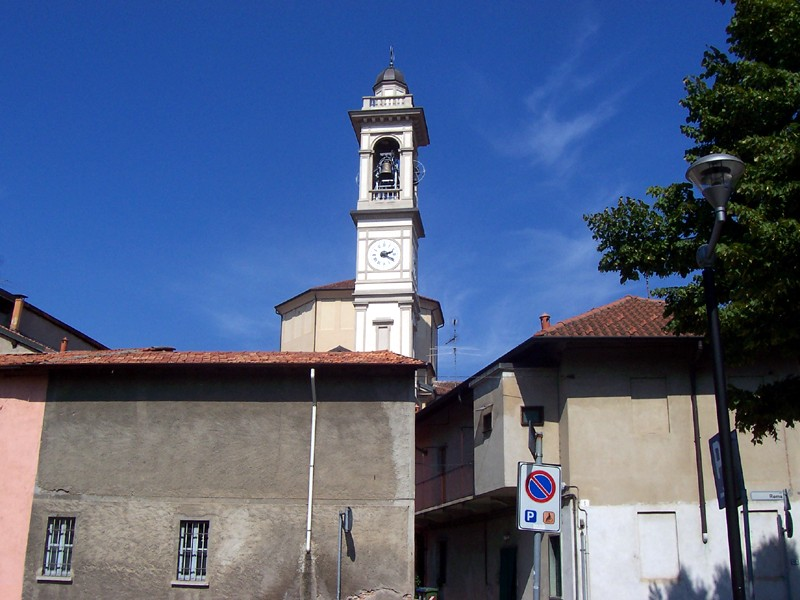
- Bell tower of San Giovanni

- Location within Italy Location within Lombardy
- Coordinates: 45°34′N 9°28′E
- Country: Italy
- Region: Lombardy
- Metropolitan city: Milan (MI)

Area
  - Total: 4.3 km^{2} (1.7 sq mi)

Population (Dec. 2004)
  - Total: 2,533
  - Density: 590/km^{2} (1,500/sq mi)
- Demonym: Masatesi
- Time zone: UTC+1 (CET)
  - Summer (DST): UTC+2 (CEST)
- Postal code: 20060
- Dialing code: 02
- Website: Official website

Masate (local Lombard: Masàa) is a comune (municipality) in the Metropolitan City of Milan in the Italian region Lombardy, located about 25 kilometres (16 mi) northeast of Milan. As of 31 December 2004, it had a population of 2,533 and an area of 4.3 square kilometres (1.7 mi^{2}).

Masate borders the following municipalities: Basiano, Pozzo d'Adda, Cambiago, Gessate, Inzago.

== Demographic evolution ==
Historical population

Year	Pop.	±%
1861	994	—
1871	1,091	+9.8%
1881	1,243	+13.9%
1901	1,352	+8.8%
1911	1,509	+11.6%

Year	Pop.	±%
1921	1,483	−1.7%
1931	1,300	−12.3%
1936	1,225	−5.8%
1951	1,400	+14.3%
1961	1,342	−4.1%

Year	Pop.	±%
1971	1,362	+1.5%
1981	1,640	+20.4%
1991	2,011	+22.6%
2001	2,459	+22.3%

Source: Data from ISTAT
