= Caponago =

- Comune
- Comune di Caponago
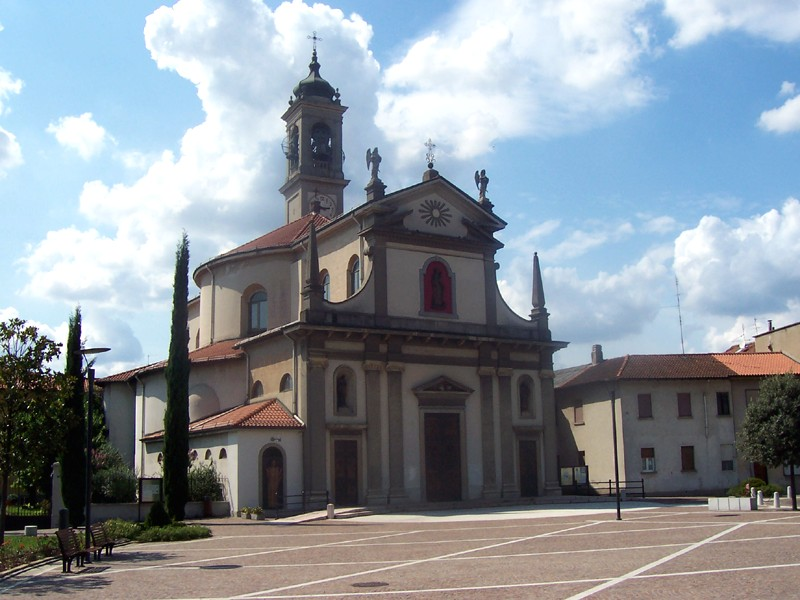
- Parish church of St Juliana

- Coat of arms

- Location within Italy Location within Lombardy
- Coordinates: 45°34′N 9°23′E
- Country: Italy
- Region: Lombardy
- Province: Monza and Brianza (MB)

Government
  - Mayor: Carlo Cavenago

Area
  - Total: 5.0 km^{2} (1.9 sq mi)
- Elevation: 158 m (518 ft)

Population (31 December 2010)
  - Total: 5,199
  - Density: 1,000/km^{2} (2,700/sq mi)
- Demonym: Caponaghesi
- Time zone: UTC+1 (CET)
  - Summer (DST): UTC+2 (CEST)
- Postal code: 20867
- Dialing code: 02
- Website: Official website

Caponago is a comune (municipality) in the Province of Monza and Brianza in the Italian region Lombardy, located about 12 kilometres (7 mi) northeast of Milan.

Caponago borders the following municipalities: Agrate Brianza, Cambiago, Pessano con Bornago, Carugate.
