= Ciro Grassi =

Italian composer (1868–1952)

Ciro Grassi (Cavriana 12 May 1868 – Padua 2 July 1952) was an Italian composer, organist and teacher.

== Life ==
He studied with Polibio Fumagalli and Luigi Mapelli at the Conservatory of Milan. He was first organist and vice maestro di cappella of the Cappella Musicale del Santo in Padua till his retirement in 1942. Grassi held the classes of organ and history and aesthetics of music of Liceo Musicale Pollini.

== Compositions ==
- 8 Pezzi per organo, op.1
- Messa a due voci virili, op.2
- Psalm 110: Confitebor tibi, op.3 (1900)
- Tantum ergo, op.4 (1900)
- Messa breve e facile a 3 voci con accompagnamento d'Organo, op.5
- Vespro, op.6 (1900)
- 6 Corali per organo su temi gregoriani, op.7
- 2 motets (Veritas mea, Ecce Sacerdos), op.8
- Miserere, op.9
- La S. Messa: Cinque pezzi per armonio od organo, op.10
- Si quaeris: responsorio a 3 voci pari con Organo, op.11
- Passio pel Mercordì Santo, op.12
- 3 motets (Dixit Dominus, Iste confessor, Deus tuorum militum), op.15
- 6 Pezzi corali (Alma Redemptoris, Ave Regina Coelorum, Regina Coeli, Salve Regina, Magnificat VIII toni, Litaniae Lauretanae), op.17 (1903)
- 3 motets (Omnes de Saba, Reges Tharsis, Vidimus Stellam), op.18 (1903)
- Preludio, versetto e postludio per organo, op.20
- 2 motets (Justorum Animae, Beati Mundo Corde), op.21
- Messa in onore del serafico patriarca S. Francesco d'Assisi, op.24
- Messa funebre a 4 voci miste sole, op.32
- 3 Pezzi d'organo (Preludio, pastorale, postludio), op.33 (1913)
- Quattro canti Eucaristici (Pange lingua, Panis angelicus, O salutaris hostia, Tantum ergo), op.36
- 3 Inni (Pange Lingua, tantum ergo a 1, tantum ergo a 3), op.38
- 2 Motetti eucaristici (Adoremus in aeternum Pie pellicane), op.39 (1913)
- Responsorio eucaristico, op.40
- Seniores populi, op.41
- Masses, proprium and motets in manuscripts

=== Writings ===
- Fondamenti fisici e storia della musica (1935)
- Storia della musica

== Sources ==
- De Angelis, Alberto: L'Italia musicale d'oggi, dizionario dei musicisti (1918)
- Bruno Pasut, «Breve sintesi storica della ex Pontificia Cappella Musicale Antoniana di Padova», in Atti e Memorie dell'Ateneo di Treviso n.s. 11 (1993/94), p. 121.
