= Luca Fumagalli =

Italian pianist, composer, and music educator

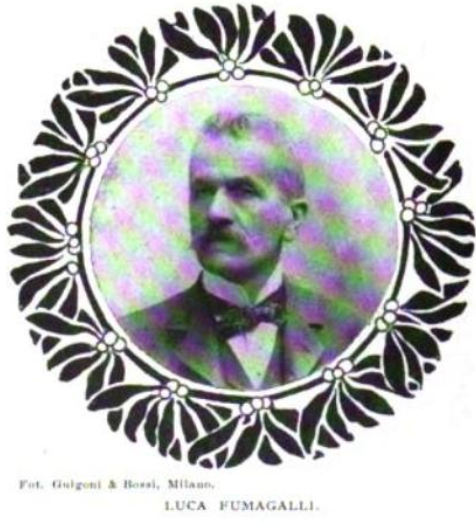
Luca Fumagalli - around January 1908

Luca Fumagalli (May 29, 1837, Inzago – June 5, 1908, Milan) was an Italian composer, pianist, and music educator.

Fumagalli was born in what was then part of the Austrian Empire. He studied at the Milan Conservatory before traveling to Paris in 1860. He taught piano at the Philadelphia Conservatory and, later, in Milan. His opera Luigi XI was premiered at the Teatro della Pergola in Florence in 1875; he also composed a symphony titled Sinfonia Marinaresca and several virtuosic piano works.

Fumagalli's brothers Carlo, Disma, Adolfo, and Polibio were all composers as well.
