= Michelangelo Fumagalli =

Italian painter

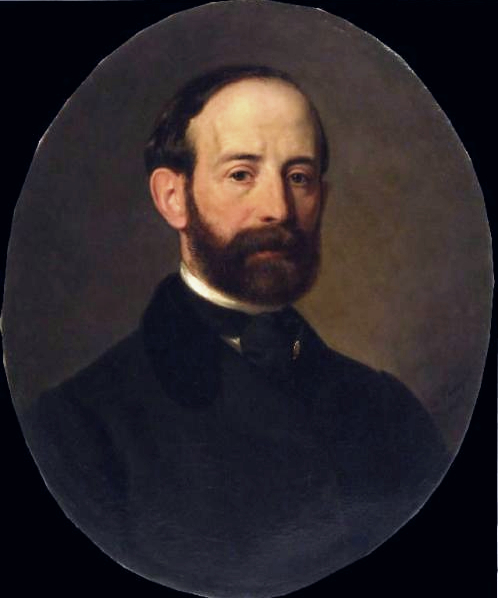
Self-portrait (1867)

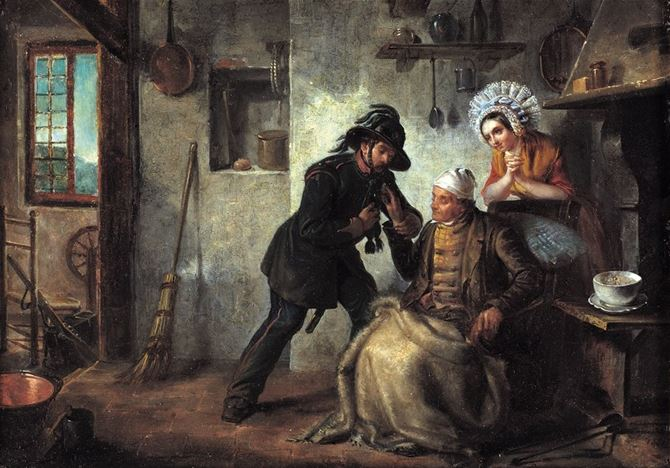
Visit from a Bersagliere

Michelangelo Fumagalli (14 April 1812, Milan – 25 January 1886, Milan) was an Italian painter; known primarily for historical and genre scenes.

== Life and work ==
He was born to the artist Ignazio Fumagalli and his wife, Marianna née Bernasconi. Following in his father's footsteps, he attended the Accademia di Brera, where he studied with Luigi Sabatelli. He received several awards from 1834 to 1836 and had his first exhibition at the Accademia in 1837, with nine commissioned portraits. He continued to exhibit there until 1860.

After being harshly criticized for a mythological painting in 1840, he began to focus on historical subjects. His exhibition in 1842, featuring a commission from the Duke of Litta, was one of his most successful. In 1843 and 1844, he included some genre scenes.

In 1848, he expressed his sympathy with the Revolution and those who wanted to free Northern Italy from the Austrian Empire. Together with Alessandro Durini, he created a lithograph depicting a major victory against the Austrians. The proceeds from its sale were donated to help nurse wounded soldiers.

After 1851, he developed a tendency to paint in small formats, and was influenced in his choice of subject matter by the Venetian painter, Francesco Hayez. In 1859, following Italy's liberation from Austria, with the French as allies, he presented a painting of Carlo Goldoni giving Italian language lessons to the daughter of King Louis XV. This was followed in 1860 with portraits of Napoleon III and the soon-to-be King of Italy, Victor Emmanuel II.

His works are poorly documented after that time. There is a self-portrait and an unidentified fresco from 1867, a portrait of Dr. Giovanni Clerici, at the Ospedale Maggiore, from 1871, and a scene showing Admiral Vettor Pisani in prison, from 1872. Many sources give his year of death as 1876, even though he is listed as a participant in the National Exhibition of 1881.

He actually died in 1886, at home, and is buried at the Cimitero Monumentale di Milano next to his wife, Pierina née Soresi.
