= Adolfo Fumagalli =

Italian pianist and composer

Adolfo Fumagalli (19 October 1828 – 3 May 1856) was a 19th-century Italian virtuoso pianist and composer, known today primarily for his virtuosic compositions for the left hand alone.

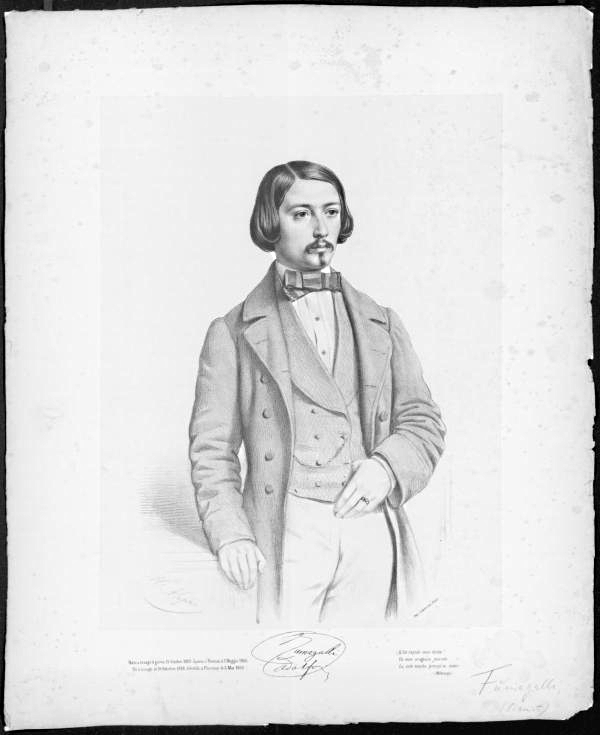
Lithograph by Marie Alexandre Alophe (1812–1883)

== Life ==
Born in Inzago, Italy, he grew up in a very musically oriented environment. He had three brothers who also became musicians and composers, these being Carlo (1822–1907), Luca (1837–1908), Disma (1826–1893) and Polibio (1830–1901). Fumagalli stuided from 23 November 1837 to 7 September 1847 at the Milan Conservatory under Pietro Ray for counterpoint and Angeleri for piano. Afterwards in 1848, at the age of 20, made his Milan debut with some success. He had a series of popular concert tours throughout the major cities of Italy, France and Belgium until 1854. His greatest sensation when he began performing his compositions for left hand alone. He was among the first to make piano pieces for one hand, along with Alexander Dreyschoc. Although he looked rather frail, as is evident from paintings of him, he had a phenomenal technique and strong fingers that astonished everyone. In 1854 he returned to Italy, where he alternated between concert tours and composing. In 1856 he was given an Erard grand piano from the firm as an advertising promotion. later in the year on May 3, he passed away.

Fumagalli's output is quite extensive, though almost all of it is extremely difficult to obtain today. His works consist primarily of operatic fantasies and character pieces. One of his most difficult and virtuosic works is his Grande Fantasie sur Robert le Diable de Meyerbeer, op.106 (dedicated to Liszt) for the left hand. He also composed an arrangement of Vincenzo Bellini's "Casta Diva" from Norma for the left hand. Almost his entire output is for solo piano and the works which employ other instruments all seem to include the piano in some way, a feature that is similar to Chopin's output. Although he was perhaps not a very inspired or ingenious composer, his works for left hand alone stand nonetheless as an important testament of the progress in technique and virtuosity of the period, especially of single-handed works.

== Musical works ==
Adolfo Fumagalli smoking a cigar while playing. Judging by the devils around his hand, he is probably playing his Robert le Diable Fantasy.

List of works:

- Op. 1 Fantaisie on motives from Verdi's opera Nabuccodonosor for piano
- Op. 2 Notturno-Studio for left hand
- Op. 3 The Devil's Galop for piano
- Op. 4a Reminiscences of Meyerbeer's opera Robert le Diable for piano
- Op. 6 Tarantelle for piano
- Op. 8 La fucina di Vulcano/ Il Canto dei Ciclopi : scherzo fantastique for piano
- Op. 11 Caprice romantique for piano
- Op. 12 Nocturne sentimentale in Ab Major for piano
- Op. 13 Il genio della danza : scherzo brillant for piano
- Op. 14 Grande fantaisie on motives from Bellini's La Sonnambula for piano
- Op. 16 Pensée pathétique for piano
- Op. 17 Nocturnino for piano
- Op. 18
  - No.1 Studio da Concerto based on Fra poco a me ricovero from Donizetti's opera Lucia di Lammermoor for left hand
  - No.2 Studio da Concerto based on Coro O Signore del tetto natio from Verdi's opera I Lombardi for left hand
- Op. 20 Les trois soeurs : petites fantaisies for piano
  - No.1 Based on Verdi's opera Attila
  - No.2 Based on Verdi's opera Foscari
  - No.3 Based on Verdi's opera Ernani
- Op. 21 Les clochettes : grande concerto fantastique pour piano avec l'accompagnement d'un grand orchestra et une campanella
- Op. 23 Quatres airs de ballet variés from Verdi's opera Jérusalem for piano
  - No.1 Pas de Quatre
  - No.2 Pas de Deux
  - No.3 Pas Seul
  - No.4 Pas d'Ensemble
- Op. 26 Grande Fantaisie Drammatique on motives from Donizetti's opera Lucia di Lammermoor for piano
- Op. 27 Grande Caprice de Concert for piano
- Op. 28 Grande Fantasie on Bellini's opera I Puritani (Dedicated to his brother Polibio for piano
- Op. 29 Nenna : Tarantella Giocosa for piano
- Op. 30 Grande Fantaisie on Bellini's opera Norma for piano
- Op. 31 Petit morceau de salon on Verdi's opera Macbeth for piano
- Op. 32 Petit morceau de salon on Verdi's opera La Battaglia di Legnano for piano
- Op. 33 La pendule : caprice fantastique contenant un galop-carillon et un polka-mazurka for piano
- Op. 34 Petite Fantaisie on Verdi's opera Lucrezia Borgia for piano
- Op. 35 Petite Fantaisie on Donizetti's opera Elisir d'amore for piano
- Op. 36 Beatrice di tenda : petit morceau de salon for piano
- Op. 37 Souvenir de Nice : polka-caprice for piano
- Op. 38 Nocturne: Une Nuit d'Été, passetemps sentimental for piano
- Op. 39 Amorosa : mazurka sentimentale for piano
- Op. 40 La capricciosa : Tyrolienne for piano
- Op. 41 Morceau de salon : chanson espagnole from Rossi's opera Il domino nero for piano
- Op. 42 Morceau de salon on Rossi's opera Il domino nero for piano
- Op. 43 Le prophete : grande fantaisie de bravoure for piano
- Op. 44 La serenade espagnole : morceau elegant for piano
- Op. 45 Fantaisie on Bonoldi's opera Nera Orientale for piano
- Op. 47 Le Postillon : galop de concert for piano
- Op. 48 Le Ruisseau : etude impromptu for piano
- Op. 49 Grande Marche cosaque on a national air for piano
- Op. 50 Serenade napolitaine for piano
- Op. 51 Le Streghe : pièce fantastique for piano
- Op. 52 Musical Recreations: two divertimenti for piano on motives from Verdi's opera Luisa Miller
  - No.1 Premier Divertimento
  - No.2 Deuxième Divertimento
- Op. 53 Esprits Folles : saltarelle for piano
- Op. 54 Fantaisie on Donizetti's opera Linda de Chamounix for piano
- Op. 55 Stabat Mater by Rossini for piano
- Op. 56 Fantaisie on Bellini's opera La Straniera for piano
- Op. 57 Si loin! : Mélody by Paul Henrion variée for piano
- Op. 58 Luisa : polka de concert for piano
- Op. 59 Fantaisie on a melody from Verdi's opera Stiffelio
- Op. 60 Grande Fantaisie Militaire for piano
  - No.1 Ronda Notturna for piano
  - No.2 Una notte al campo for piano
  - No.3 Signal d'alarme et conflit de guerre from Bellini's opera Norma for piano
  - No.4 Marcia funèbre for piano
  - No.5 Inno trionfale from Rossini's opera Le Siège de Corinthe for piano
  - No.6 Orgia for piano
- Op. 60 Grande Fantaisie Militaire transcribed for four hands by the author
- Op. 61 Casta diva from Bellini's opera Norma for left hand
- Op. 62 La sacrilega parola : Variations on the Grande Adagio Finale from the 2nd act of Donizetti's opera Poliuto for piano
- Op. 63 Souvenir de Chopin : mazurka for piano
- Op. 64 La Derelitta : pensée romantique for piano
- Op. 65 La festa dell'innocenza : cinque morceaux brillants for piano
- Op. 66 Fantasie brillante on motives from Donizetti's opera Poliuto for piano
- Op. 68 Introduction et Grande Nocturne on Sanelli's opera Il Fornaretto for piano
- Op. 69 La Baccante : caprice burlesque for piano
- Op. 70 Sogno d'amore : pensée fugitive for piano
- Op. 71 Morceau de Salon : caprice on Chiaromonte's opera Il Gondoliero for piano
- Op. 72 Fantaisie Brillante on Verdi's opera I Due Foscari for piano
- Op. 73 Nocturne variée on the romanza Fior di bonta bell'angelo from Villanis's opera La Regina di Leone for piano
- Op. 74 Fantaisie Brillante on Verdi's opera Ernani for piano
- Op. 75 I Lombardi alla prima Crociata : introduction et grande adagio variées sur la terzette "Qual volutta trascorrere" for piano
- Op. 76 Laura : polonaise de concert for piano
- Op. 77 Saluto al Tamigi : deuxième polka de concert, capriccio-impromptu for piano
- Op. 78 Un lamento : deuxième mazurka sentimentale for piano
- Op. 79 L' Absence : romance variée for piano
- Op. 80 La Chasse : morceau brillant for piano
- Op. 81 Grande Ouverture de Benvenuto Cellini par Hector Berlioz : transcrite pour piano
- Op. 82 Nocturne elegant for piano
- Op. 83 La danse des sylphes, de Felix Godefroid : rondo brillant for piano
- Op. 84 Grande Fantaisie on Bellini's opera I Puritani for two pianos
- Op. 85 Preghiera alla Madonna "O Santissima Vergine" : Popular Tuscan song by L. Gordigiani transcribed for piano
- Op. 86 L' Étincelle : reverie de F. Bonoldi variée pour piano
- Op. 87 La buena ventura : chanson andalouse de Yradier variée for piano
- Op. 88 La cloche : mélodie de F. Bonoldi variée pour piano
- Op. 89 Introduction et adagio varié on the romanza "Sempre all'alba ed alla sera" from the opera Giovanna d'Arco for piano
- Op. 90 Le Palmier : polka des magots for piano
- Op. 91 Fantaisie on Verdi's Nabucodonosor for piano
- Op. 92 Paraphrase on the barcarolle Una Barchetta in Mar from Donizetti's opera Gianni di Calais for piano
- Op. 94 Paraphrase on the Grande adagio finale from Coccia's opera La solitaria delle Asturie for piano
- Op. 95 Un carnaval de plus, souvenir de Venice : Caprice de Concert for piano
- Op. 95b Fantaisie on Verdi's opera Il Trovatore for piano
- Op. 98 Fantaisie on Verdi's opera La Traviata for piano
- Op. 100 École Moderne du Pianiste : recueil de 24 morceaux caracteristiques for piano
- Op. 101 Tarantelle de bravoure on Thomas's opera La Tonelli for piano
- Op. 102 Mi mancha la voce (Andante) from Rossini's opera Mosé in Egitto for left hand, also known as Studio Transcendentale
- Op. 103 Cantique de Noel for piano
- Op. 104 Berceuse for piano
- Op. 105 L' Échange : ariette for piano
- Op. 106 Grande Fantasie sur Robert le Diable de Meyerbeer (Dedicated to Franz Liszt) for left hand
- Op. 107 posth. Mon Ange : mélodie d'Auguste Morel transcrit pour piano
- Op. 108 posth. Illustrations from Verdi's opera Giovanna de Guzman (I Vespri Siciliani) for piano
- Op. 108 Premier Boléro
- Op. 109 posth. Ariele : nocturne variée from Leoni's opera Suddetta for piano
- Op. 110 Enfants, n'y touchez pas : romance for piano
- Op. 111 Paraphrase on Buzzolla's barcarolle Tace il vento in ciel sereno for piano
- Op. 112 posth. Duettino "Presso alla tomba" (the author's last work) for piano

Also included in his output are several songs for voice and piano.
