= Ignazio Fumagalli =

Italian painter (1778–1842)

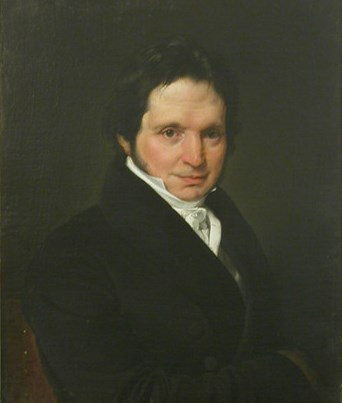
Ignazio Fumagalli by Francesco Hayez (1830)

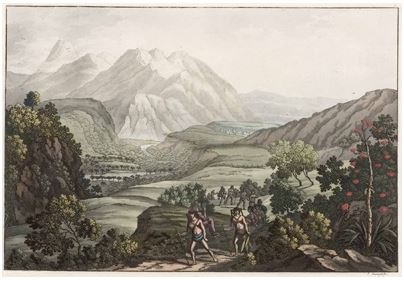
Wandering youths in an Arcadian landscape

Ignazio Fumagalli (1778–1842) was an Italian painter and engraver.

== Life and work ==
He was born in Milan. He studied at the Accademia di Brera, and served as its Secretary from 1817 until his death. This role included preparing the annual inaugural speeches, which often expressed the Accademia's political viewpoints.

For several years, he also held the Chair of Aesthetics. During the 1830s, he was an art critic for the literary magazine Biblioteca Italiana, and served as one of its Directors.

His most familiar work is a book of engravings and essays, Scuola di Lionardo da Vinci in Lombardia, created from 1808 to 1811. He also modelled two figures for the Duomo di Milano, representing Saint Bartholomew and Ezekiel. Some of his engravings were included in the Pictorial and historical journey to the three lakes Maggiore, Lugano and Como by the German engravers Friedrich Lose and his wife, Caroline (1784–1837), who both worked in Milan.

He was married to Marianna née Bernasconi. Their son, Michelangelo, also became a well-known artist.

Fumagalli died in 1842 in Milan. Many of his works are in the Civic Collection of engravings at the Royal Villa of Monza.
