= Cassina de' Pecchi =

- Comune
- Comune di Cassina de' Pecchi
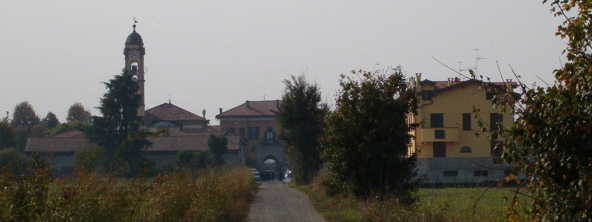

- Coat of arms

- Location within Italy Location within Lombardy
- Coordinates: 45.5167°N 9.3632°E
- Country: Italy
- Region: Lombardy
- Metropolitan city: Milan (MI)
- Frazioni: Sant'Agata Martesana, Camporicco

Government
  - Mayor: Elisa Balconi

Area
  - Total: 7.60 km^{2} (2.93 sq mi)
- Elevation: 130 m (430 ft)

Population (30 September 2015)
  - Total: 13,540
  - Density: 1,780/km^{2} (4,610/sq mi)
- Demonym: Cassinesi
- Time zone: UTC+1 (CET)
  - Summer (DST): UTC+2 (CEST)
- Postal code: 20051
- Dialing code: 02
- Patron saint: St. Mary
- Website: Official website

Cassina de' Pecchi (Lombard: Cassina de Pecci [kaˈsiːna de ˈpɛtʃi]) is a town and comune in the Metropolitan City of Milan, in Lombardy, northern Italy. The municipality is bounded by other municipalitys of Cernusco sul Naviglio, Bussero, Gorgonzola, Melzo and Vignate. Cassina de' Pecchi has received the recognition of "Sustainable city for girls and boys" in 1999, concerning councils with less than 50000 inhabitants

== Twin towns ==
Cassina de' Pecchi is twinned with:

- Élancourt, France, since 1997
