= Polibio Fumagalli =

Italian composer, organist, and pianist

Polibio Fumagalli (26 October 1830 in Inzago – 21 June 1900 in Milan) was an Italian composer, organist, and pianist.

Fumagalli studied organ at the Milan Conservatory; beginning in 1873 he taught organ at that institution. Among his students were Marco Enrico Bossi, Pietro Yon, and Ciro Grassi. He also served as choirmaster of the Church of San Celso.

Much of Fumagalli's compositional output was for his own instrument, he had over 300 pieces published. His work La Caccia was taken up by the English organist William Thomas Best as a frequent concert piece.

Fumagalli's brothers Carlo, Disma, Adolfo, and Luca were all composers as well.
