= Gessate =

Gessate Gessaa (Lombard)
- Comune
- Comune di Gessate
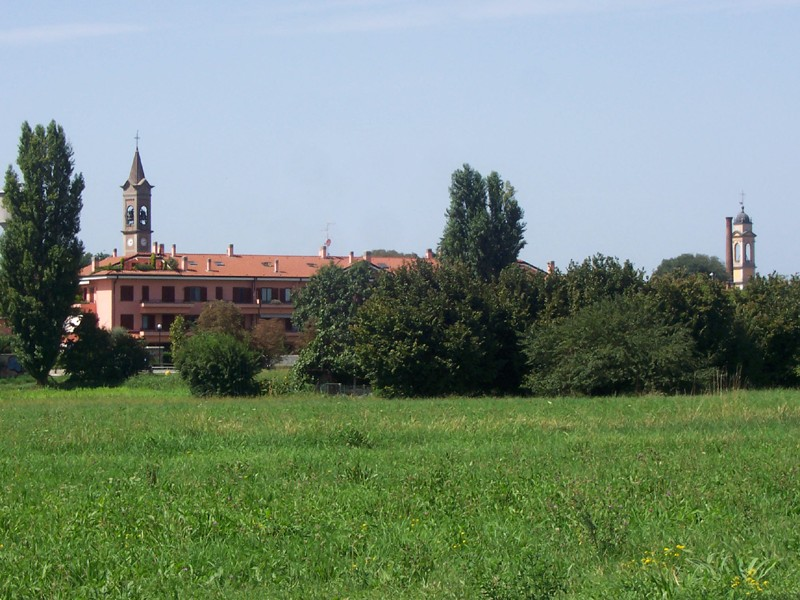

- Location within Italy Location within Lombardy
- Coordinates: 45°33′N 9°26′E
- Country: Italy
- Region: Lombardy
- Metropolitan city: Milan (MI)
- Frazioni: Villa Fornaci

Government
  - Mayor: Lucia Mantegazza

Area
  - Total: 7.8 km^{2} (3.0 sq mi)
- Elevation: 144 m (472 ft)

Population (31 December 2015)
  - Total: 8,872
  - Density: 1,100/km^{2} (2,900/sq mi)
- Demonym: Gessatesi
- Time zone: UTC+1 (CET)
  - Summer (DST): UTC+2 (CEST)
- Postal code: 20060
- Dialing code: 02
- Website: Official website

Gessate (Lombard: Gessaa [dʒeˈsaː]) is a comune (municipality) in the Metropolitan City of Milan, in the Italian region of Lombardy, located about 25 kilometres (16 mi) northeast of Milan.

Gessate borders the following municipalities: Cambiago, Masate, Pessano con Bornago, Inzago, Gorgonzola and Bellinzago Lombardo.

Gessate hosts the easternmost terminus of Milan Metro (Line 2, Gessate branch).
