= Orazio Fumagalli =

Italian sculptor

Orazio Fumagalli (21 February 1921 – 10 April 2004) was an Italian sculptor who worked in the United States.

== Biography ==
Fumagalli studied at the University of Iowa where he earned his bachelor's, master's, and doctoral degrees in fine arts.

In 1950 he received a Fulbright scholarship, which allowed him to study art in Europe for two years.

From 1959 to 1964, he was an assistant professor of art at the University of Minnesota Duluth,. In 1964, Fumagalli was brought to the University of Wisconsin-Stout, where he founded the Fine Arts Department and held a professoriate until his retirement in 1988.

Fumagalli produced a film called A House Divided with actors John Anderson and Eugene Roche. The film was about the Lincoln–Douglas debates. The film focused on the issues of slavery and what Lincoln would need to face after he got into office.

== Bibliography ==
- Orazio Fumagalli (1964). Byron Burford. Tweed Gallery, University of Minnesota.
