= Disma Fumagalli =

Italian composer and music educator

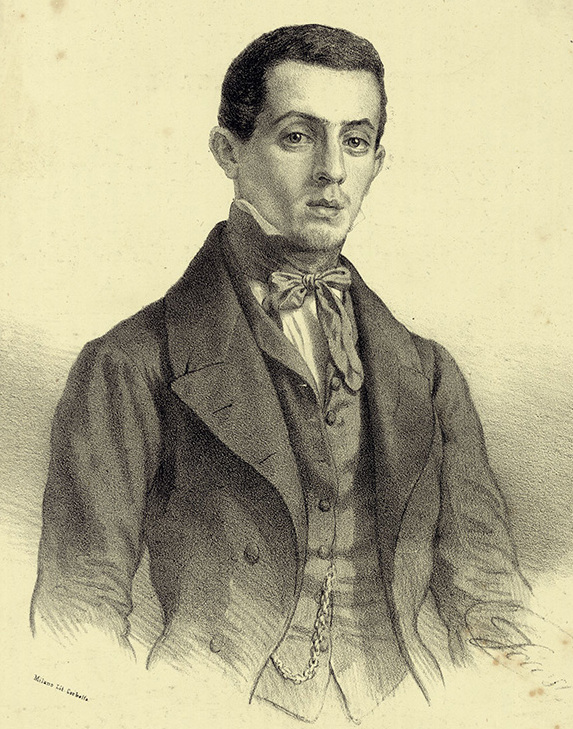
Portrait of Disma Fumagalli by Roberto Focosi

Disma Fumagalli (born Inzago, 8 September 1826 - died Milan, 9 March 1893) was an Italian composer and teacher of music. He was a graduate of the Milan Conservatory, where he began teaching piano in 1853. He composed more than 300 études for piano, as well as other exercises; he also wrote a concerto for piano and string orchestra.

Fumagalli's brothers Carlo, Polibio, Adolfo, and Luca were all composers.
