= Bellinzago Lombardo =

- Comune
- Comune di Bellinzago Lombardo
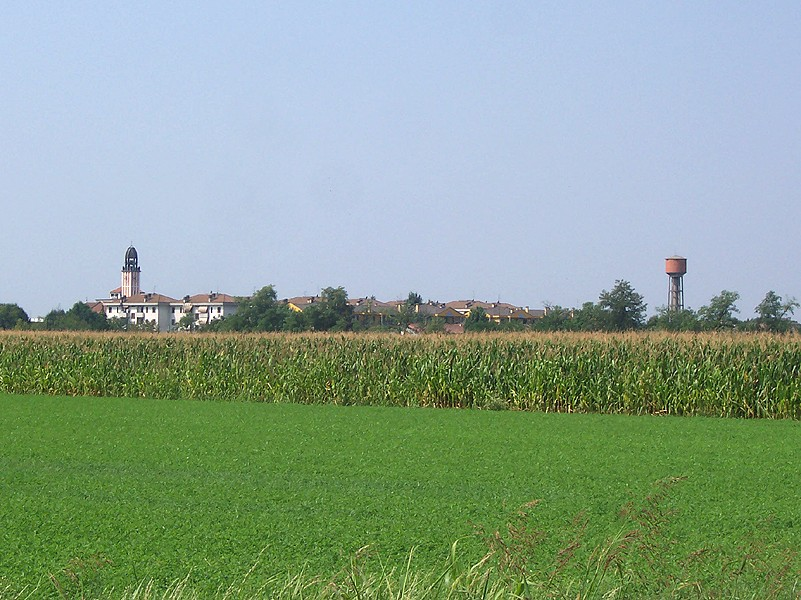
- Bellinzago plain.

- Coat of arms

- Location within Italy Location within Lombardy
- Coordinates: 45°32′N 9°27′E
- Country: Italy
- Region: Lombardy
- Metropolitan city: Milan (MI)

Government
  - Mayor: Angela Comelli

Area
  - Total: 4.5 km^{2} (1.7 sq mi)
- Elevation: 129 m (423 ft)

Population (31 December 2015)
  - Total: 3,836
  - Density: 850/km^{2} (2,200/sq mi)
- Demonym: Bellinzaghesi
- Time zone: UTC+1 (CET)
  - Summer (DST): UTC+2 (CEST)
- Postal code: 20060
- Dialing code: 02
- Website: Official website

Bellinzago Lombardo (Milanese: Bellinzagh, locally Billinzagh) is a comune (municipality) in the Metropolitan City of Milan in the Italian region Lombardy, located about 25 kilometres (16 mi) northeast of Milan.

Bellinzago Lombardo borders the following municipalities: Gessate, Inzago, Gorgonzola, Pozzuolo Martesana.
