= Bussero =

- Comune
- Comune di Bussero
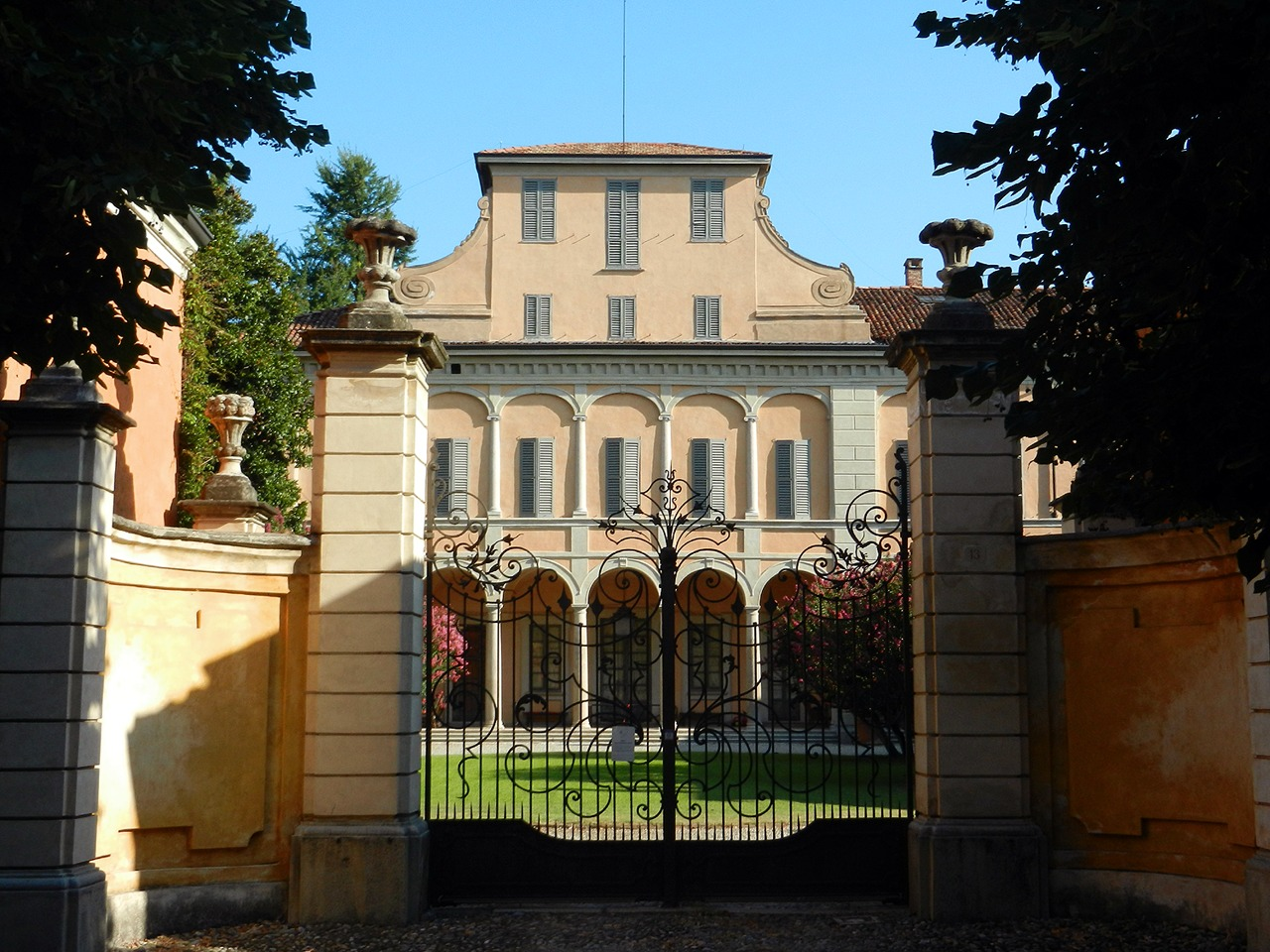
- View of Bussero

- Coat of arms

- Location within Italy Location within Lombardy
- Coordinates: 45°32′N 9°22′E
- Country: Italy
- Region: Lombardy
- Metropolitan city: Milan (MI)

Area
  - Total: 4.6 km^{2} (1.8 sq mi)
- Elevation: 142 m (466 ft)

Population (Dec. 2004)
  - Total: 8,589
  - Density: 1,900/km^{2} (4,800/sq mi)
- Demonym: Busseresi
- Time zone: UTC+1 (CET)
  - Summer (DST): UTC+2 (CEST)
- Postal code: 20060
- Dialing code: 02
- Website: Official website

Bussero (Lombard: Bussor [ˈbysur]) is a comune (municipality) in the Province of Milan in the Italian region Lombardy, located about 15 kilometres (9 mi) northeast of Milan. As of 31 December 2004, it had a population of 8,589 and an area of 4.6 square kilometres (1.8 mi^{2}).

Bussero borders the following municipalities: Pessano con Bornago, Carugate, Gorgonzola, Cernusco sul Naviglio and Cassina de' Pecchi.

Villa Sioli Legnani is just outside town.

== Demographic evolution ==
Historical population

Year	Pop.	±%
1861	1,550	—
1871	1,745	+12.6%
1881	1,821	+4.4%
1901	1,995	+9.6%
1911	2,202	+10.4%

Year	Pop.	±%
1921	2,080	−5.5%
1931	2,017	−3.0%
1936	2,006	−0.5%
1951	2,240	+11.7%
1961	2,503	+11.7%

Year	Pop.	±%
1971	2,937	+17.3%
1981	4,481	+52.6%
1991	7,313	+63.2%
2001	8,493	+16.1%

Source: Data from ISTAT
