= Cernusco sul Naviglio =

- Comune
- Città di Cernusco sul Naviglio
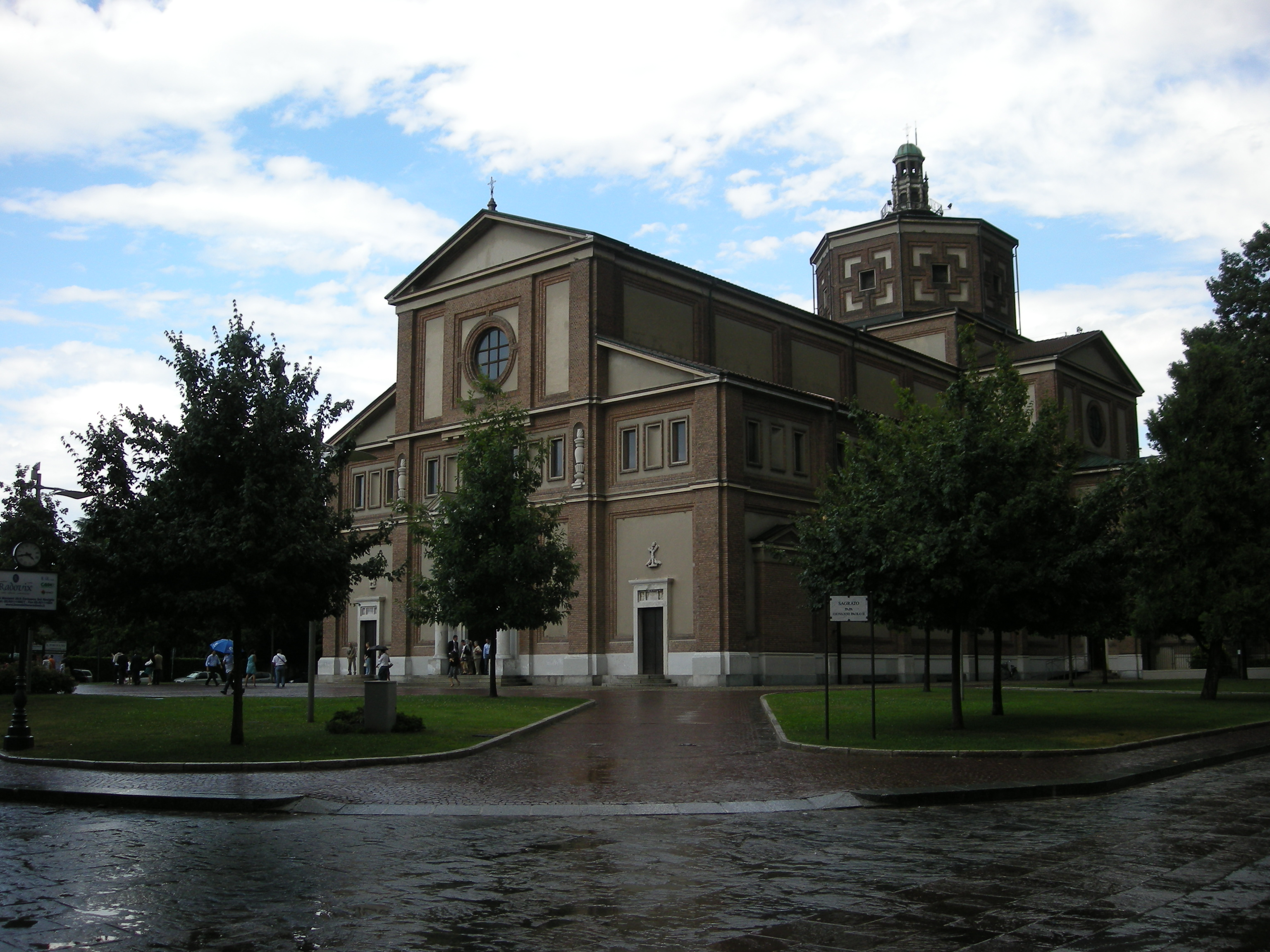
- Santa Maria Assunta church

- Coat of arms

- Location within Italy Location within Lombardy
- Coordinates: 45°31′N 9°20′E
- Country: Italy
- Region: Lombardy
- Metropolitan city: Milan (MI)
- Frazioni: Ronco

Government
  - Mayor: Paola Colombo

Area
  - Total: 13 km^{2} (5.0 sq mi)
- Elevation: 133 m (436 ft)

Population (31 March 2017)
  - Total: 34,042
  - Density: 2,600/km^{2} (6,800/sq mi)
- Demonym: Cernuschesi
- Time zone: UTC+1 (CET)
  - Summer (DST): UTC+2 (CEST)
- Postal code: 20063
- Dialing code: 02
- Patron saint: St. Roch
- Website: Official website

Cernusco sul Naviglio (Italian pronunciation: [tʃerˈnusko sul naˈviʎʎo]; Lombard: Cernusch, pronounced [tʃerˈnysk]) is a town and comune in the Metropolitan City of Milan, Lombardy, northwestern Italy. With a population of 33,436 as of 2015 it is the 14th-largest municipality in the metropolitan city.

It is located 11 kilometres (6.8 mi) northeast of Milan along the Naviglio Martesana, which gives the town its name.

== Geography ==
The municipality of Cernusco sul Naviglio has a total area of 13.33 km^{2} (5 square miles) with a median altitude of 133 metres above sea level. The municipality includes the main urban area of Cernusco and the frazione of Ronco at the eastern border of the municipal area, as well as some traditional farmhouses (cassin in Lombard) still not contiguous to other urbanized parts of the municipality.

Cernusco sul Naviglio borders, clockwise from north, the municipalities of Carugate, Bussero, Cassina de’ Pecchi, Vignate, Rodano, Pioltello, Vimodrone and Cologno Monzese (all in the Metropolitan City of Milan), and Brugherio (in the province of Monza and Brianza).

The Naviglio della Martesana, an artificial canal built in the 15th century in order to link the Adda river to the city of Milan, is the only significant waterway in the municipality.

== History ==
The etymology of the toponym Cernusco (Latin Cixinusculum) is uncertain: an Etruscan origin like for nearby Melzo (Melpum) is sometimes proposed, but the most commonly accepted hypothesis proposes a Roman origin. This latter etymology is supported by archaeological discoveries and by the fact that, until the mid-19th century, the municipality bore the name Cernusco Asinario after Caius Asinius, a Roman functionary who lived in the late 1st Century BC and whose tomb was discovered in 1849 near Cascina Lupa. Today the burial urn of Caius Asinius features in the municipal coat of arms and a street in the central part of the city is named after him.

Cernusco sul Naviglio is first mentioned in as a Roman vicus near the military road from Mediolanum (Milan) to Aquileia. In Lombard times the area was at first a feud of Queen Theodelinda; later King Berengar I of Italy gave control of those lands to the bishops of Monza; later it was acquired by the Pieve of Gorgonzola.

In the 13th century it became a fief of the Torriani family and, after the former's defeat, of the Visconti. Both families' control of the area is still reflected in the names of many farmhouses, like Cascina Torriana or Cascina Visconta. In the 15th century the area became a feud of the Sforza which ordered, during the latter half of the century, the construction of the Naviglio Martesana, whose completion increased Cernusco's economic importance. Cernusco was then given to the Visconti Marliani family and, in 1499, to the Trivulzio family.

After two centuries of continuous changes of property due to lack of heirs in the reigning families, in 1689 Cernusco became a property of the Spanish Duke Gabriele Serbelloni of Gorgonzola, under whose domination the town endured a difficult period characterized by power abuse. In the 19th century, like the rest of Lombardy, the area was annexed to the Kingdom of Italy; around that time the name was changed from Cernusco Asinario to the current form. In 1866 Cernusco sul Naviglio's current borders were fixed after the hamlet of Increa was transferred to Brugherio. Cernusco sul Naviglio received the honorary title of city with a presidential decree on March 18, 1985.

== Transport ==
Cernusco sul Naviglio, lying in the Milan metropolitan area, has a functional road network which connects it to all the surrounding areas and beyond. The most important roads serving Cernusco are the Autostrada A51 (Milan's eastern bypass road, Tangenziale Est), with exit number 13 (Cernusco s.N. - Brugherio) lying in the municipal area and the exit number 14 (Carugate) very close to its northern border, the A4 Turin-Trieste motorway, which lies just 4 km north of Cernusco, and the A58 (Milan's outer eastern bypass road) about 6 km to the east. The SS11 Padana Superiore, formerly one of the most important roads in today’s Northern Italy, is another important link which passes through the southern part of the municipality.

Cernusco lies about 12 km away from Milano-Linate airport; in the municipality there are also two stations on Line 2 of the Milan Metro, Cernusco sul Naviglio near the city centre and Villa Fiorita in the eastern part, serving the main industrial area.

== People ==
- Gaetano Scirea, international football player
- Simona Malpezzi, politician
- Simone Collio, sprinter
- Cristiano Biraghi, footballer
