= Inzago =

Inzago Inzagh (Lombard)
- Comune
- Comune di Inzago
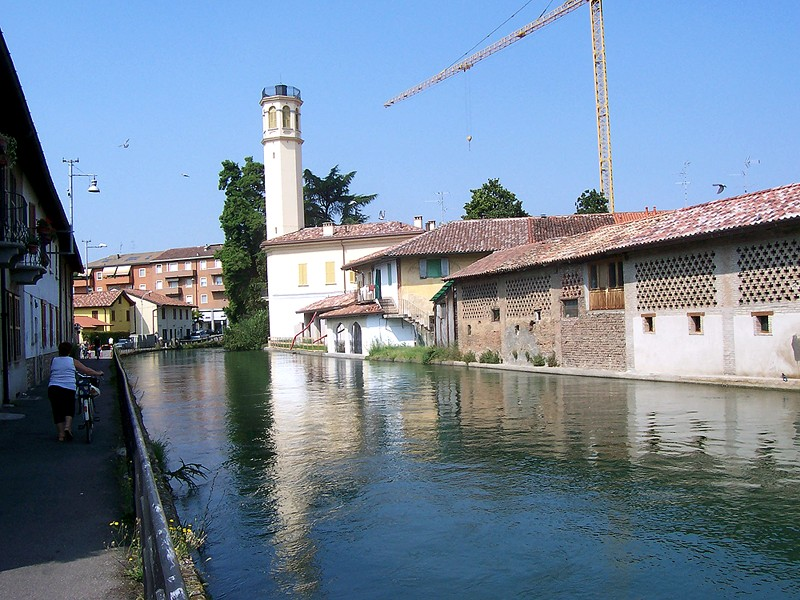
- A naviglio of Inzago

- Location within Italy Location within Lombardy
- Coordinates: 45°32′N 9°29′E
- Country: Italy
- Region: Lombardy
- Metropolitan city: Milan (MI)

Government
  - Mayor: Benigno Calvi (Centre-Left)

Area
  - Total: 12.1 km^{2} (4.7 sq mi)
- Elevation: 137 m (449 ft)

Population (31 December 2010)
  - Total: 10,541
  - Density: 871/km^{2} (2,260/sq mi)
- Demonym: Inzaghesi
- Time zone: UTC+1 (CET)
  - Summer (DST): UTC+2 (CEST)
- Postal code: 20065
- Dialing code: 02
- Website: Official website

Inzago (Italian: [inˈdzaːɡo]; Lombard: Inzagh or Inzaa [ĩˈsaː(k)]) is a comune (municipality) in the Metropolitan City of Milan in the Italian region of Lombardy, located about 25 kilometres (16 mi) northeast of Milan.

Inzago borders the following municipalities: Pozzo d'Adda, Masate, Gessate, Cassano d'Adda, Bellinzago Lombardo, Pozzuolo Martesana.

The brothers Luca, Disma, Adolfo, and Polibio Fumagalli were all born in Inzago. All were composers; Adolfo, Luca, and Disma were pianists, and Polibio was an organist. Also born in Inzago were the supercentenarian Maria Redaelli, the architect Giuseppe Boretti, the Venerable Benigno Calvi, and the cyclist Gabriele Missaglia.
