= Villa Sioli Legnani, Bussero =

Building in Bussero, Italy

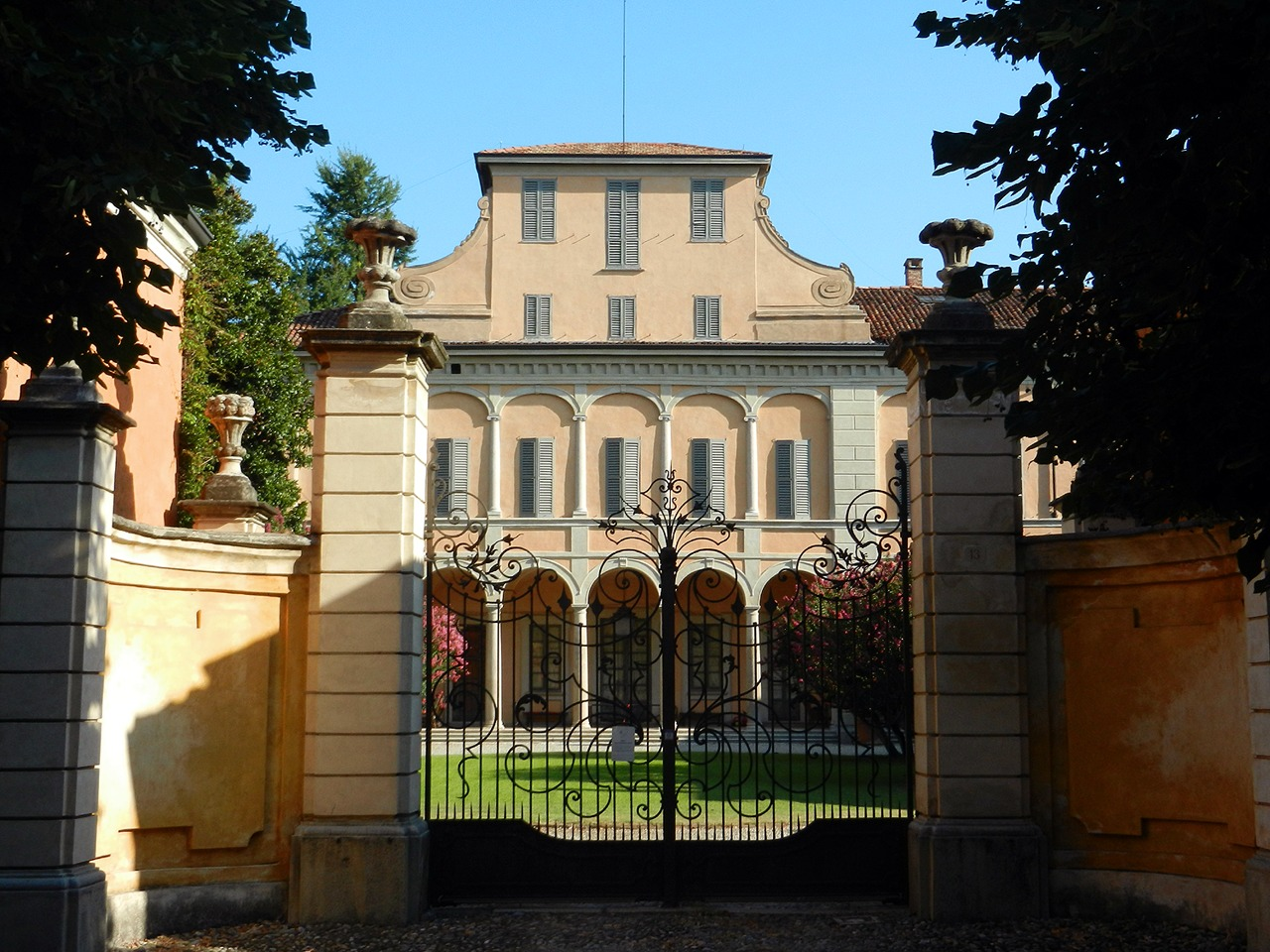
Villa Sioli Legnani

The Villa Sioli Legnani is a 19th-century rural palace located just outside the town of Bussero, Province of Milan, Lombardy, Italy.

== History ==
Initially built by the Corio family in the second half of the 1500s, and work progressed in 1588 after coming into the hands of the doctor Giulio Cesare Corio. In 1628, his grandsons continued work on the villa, which consisted of a rectangular block of two stories. One side had an attic. The U-shaped layout we see today was built by the early 1700s. The interior had a chapel dedicated to Saint Catherine. The east wing has a monumental staircase leading to the piano nobile.

The property was inherited by Giuseppe Gorini Corio who married Catterina Aliprandi, a widow elder than he was. Once widowed, he married a younger Bradamante Rasini. However once Giuseppe died, his family sued for the property, further dividing up the inheritance.

The property passed hands a few times, and in 1822 it was purchased by Giovanni Legnani. The Legnani family hired the architect and landscaper Giuseppe Balzaretto to refurbish the building and grounds. The chapel was removed to add a second staircase. The dining room was enlarged and roccoco decoration was added.

The earliest garden and orchard in 1700 had a symmetric and highly manicured layout. After 1830, the modifications of Balzaretto created a more rambling, English garden with more attention to vistas. The garden facade, previously simple and undecorated, was reformulated and added a semi-private patio adjacent to the facade.
