= Saint Bartholomew, Brugherio =

Cathedral and oldest parish in Brugherio, Italy

Coordinates: 45.55056°N 9.30169°E

Saint Bartholomew (Chiesa di San Bartolomeo)
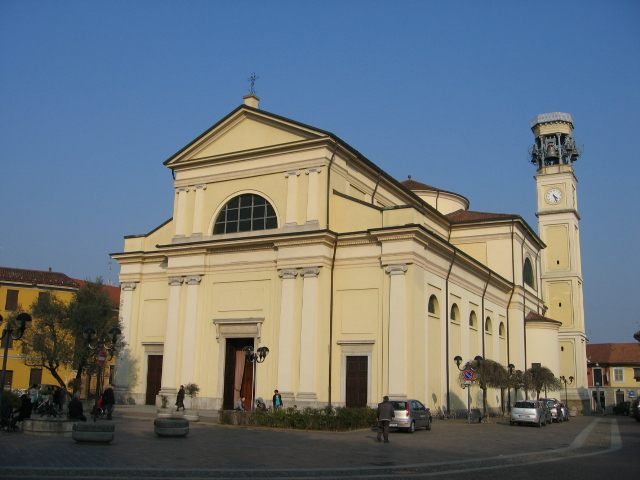
- Exterior view of the church, from Piazza Roma

Religion
- Affiliation: Roman Catholic
- Province: Monza and Brianza
- Region: Lombardy
- Patron: Saint Bartholomew
- Year consecrated: 1578, 1855, 1939
- Status: Cathedral

Location
- Municipality: Brugherio
- State: Italy
- Interactive map of Saint Bartholomew (Chiesa di San Bartolomeo)

Architecture
- Architects: Giacomo Moraglia, Leo Sorteni
- Style: Classical
- Groundbreaking: 1578
- Completed: 1939

The Church of Saint Bartholomew (Italian: Chiesa di San Bartolomeo) is the cathedral and the oldest parish in Brugherio, Italy. It houses relics of the three Magi. It is characterised by its relatively high bell tower measuring 36.8 metres (121 ft).

== History ==
=== Early years ===
==== 1578–1582 ====
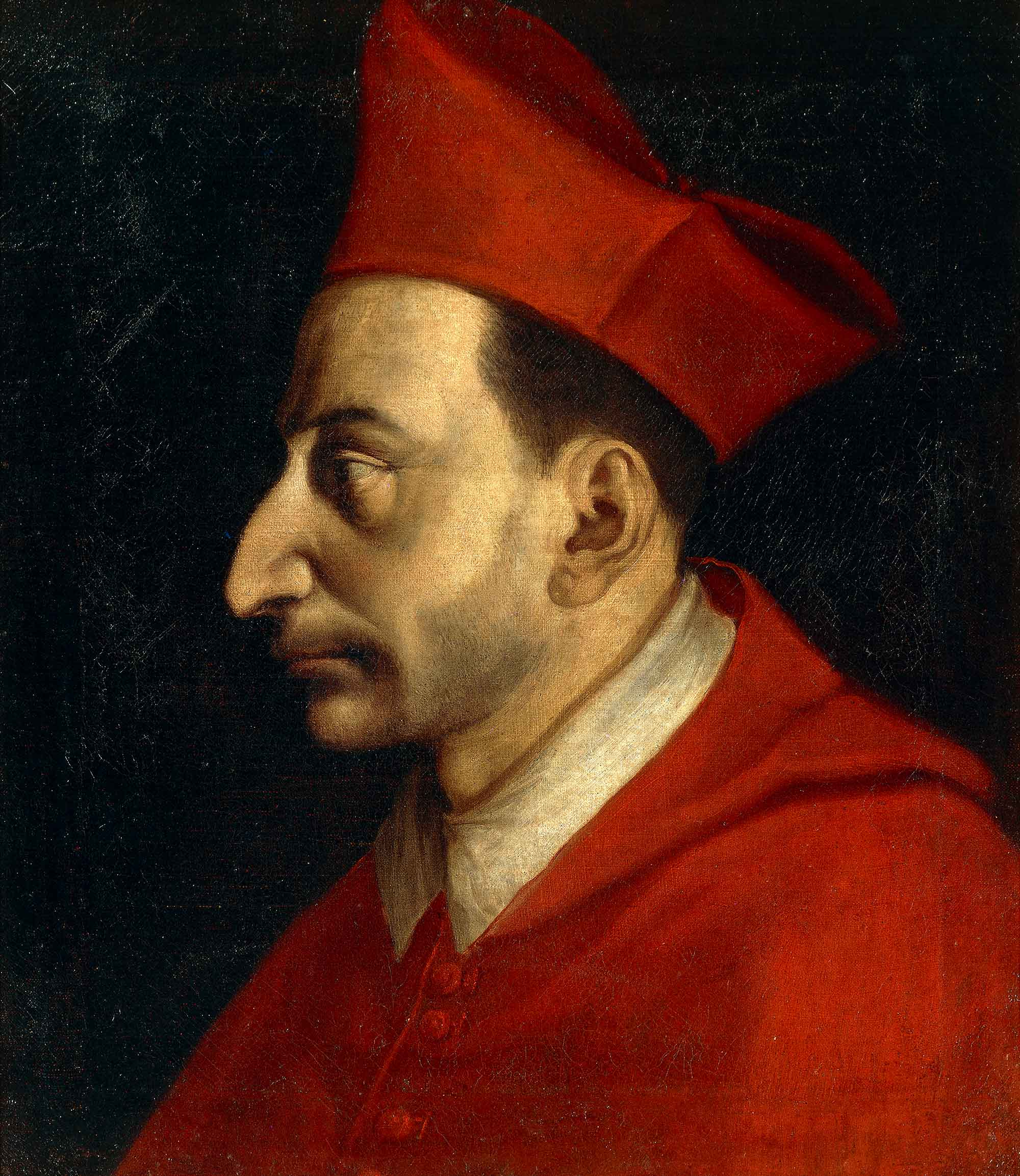
Charles Borromeo by Giovanni Ambrogio Figino in the second half of the 16th century, now in the Catholic Archdiocese of Milan Museum.

When Charles Borromeo, bishop of Milan and later Saint, decided to establish a parish in Brugherio, he found there a small ancient, nearly ruined, and unconsecrated church serving the parish and hosting the eucharist. Despite these problems, Borromeo established the new entity which he entrusted to Don Arcangelo Biancardi. At first, he wanted to include as part of the church's estate a few local farmhouses, such as Cascina de' Bastoni (with its oratory of Maria Nascente), S. Cristoforo of Ottavo, S. Damiano, Sant'Albino, Sant'Ambrogio and S. Donato. In the end he excluded from the parish: Cascina Bastoni, Cascina Sant'Albino, Cascina San Donato and Cascina S. Damiano. In 1582 the Cardinal-Archbishop visited the church once again and consecrated the building in honour of Saint Bartholomew. The separation from the richer parish of Saint Gerard of Monza was extensively argued at the time, as it did not require the payment of an annual fee paid to the parish priest for his personal and the building's needs. He then decided to enlarge the church via its facade and build the sacristy where the kitchen (used as sacristy) was located. The fireplace was used to hang the paraments, and he designated an exclusive location for a baptistry.

==== 1582–1613 ====
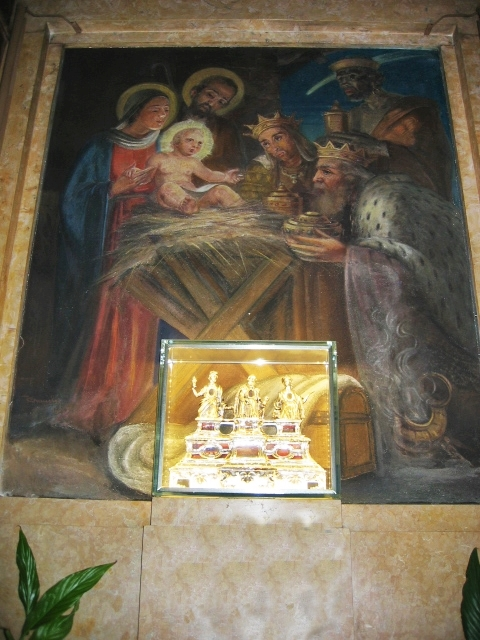
Altare dei Magi, with a copy of the Magi reliquary. The copy was created for the 400th anniversary of the transportation of the relics of the Three Magi in this parish, in 2013. Vittorio Granchi's fresco.

The parish was poor and it struggled to fund the improvements identified by saint Charles on his pastoral visits. In 1596, Charles's cousin made a pastoral visit with the newly appointed archbishop Frederick. They found that the Blessed Sacrament and the oil used for the extreme unction were in a "tabernacle...small and wooden". The church was judged to need needed adaptations to make it conform to canonical standards. Two spiritual religious institutions, suggested by the Council of Trent were formed: the Schola del Santissimo Sacramento and the Schola della Dottrina cristiana. The first of these was founded in 1578 and it was created to encourage the congregation to get involved in particular devotional practices. The Schola della Dottrina cristiana on the other hand was to instruct the faithful in matters of faith and remove them from heresy. The Church's most notable event during this time, however, was to be the Papal recognition of the church's relics of the three Magi. The major part of these relics were transferred in Cologne by Federico Borromeo in 1613. In this same year, on 27 May, the partial relics were transferred from the nearby saint Ambrogio's church, while under the supervision of the parish priest Francesco Bernardino Paleario.

=== 19th century ===
==== De Petri's Cronaca ====
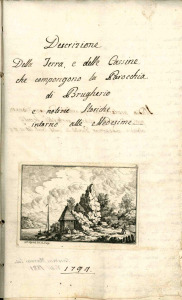
Frontispiece of Paolo Antonio De Petri's manuscript of 1794

Antonio De Petri (or Petro), parish priest from 1778 to 1819, took inspiration from the Monza historian Antonio Francesco Frisi's works, called Memorie storiche della città di Monza, and wrote a report about Saint Bartholomew's church. He described that the church's façade was decorated with cornices, pilasters and bands with a pediment gabled sharp that "befitted the structure itself". It was possible to enter through three locations: a wider entrance to the center and two minor entrances to the sides; each input corresponded to a nave. The aisles were closed by the side walls. Above the main door there was a window that provided light to the central nave. The aisles were divided by three arches supported by twin doric columns of stone with a wide intercolumniation covered by a lintel, the columns being leaned on the side of the presbytery and the facade, above four pilasters. There were also paintings found inside, including one depicting the Martydom of saint Margaret, belonging to the seventeenth century. This report from De Petri established drastic changes compared to the Borromeo brothers' description. The current bell tower was also built within this period.

==== 19th century decorations ====
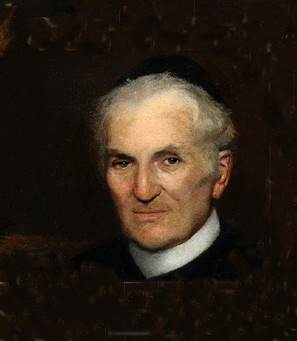
Don Gian Andrea Nova (extract of painting -ritrovamento-del-quadro-da-una-frase-nascosta-negli-archivi-parrocchiali/ Il ritrovamento del quadro, da una frase nascosta negli archivi parrocchiali)], 3 October 2014, NoiBrugherio, in Italian, Retrieved 28 August 2015</ref>

Don Gian Andrea Nova ran the church from 1838 to 1878 and under his supervision, Giuseppe Maroni and Giuseppe Schieppati undertook an artistic refurbishment of the church. After the pastoral visit of Archbishop Romilli in 1851 it was decided to expand the church to address the growth in population. Nova instructed the architect Giacomo Moraglia in 1854. Within a year, the presbytery was built, the facade was reconstructed, as well as the lower arms of the trampset. The first stone was laid on April 1, 1854, and by October 9, 1855, the new church was substantially finished. A plaque within the church records this event. The new church's layout was a greek cross. The new parish priest, Giuseppe Maroni, called the Milanese artist, Giovanni Valtorta, to paint the frescos which are still extant.

Also in the second half of the nineteenth century, Father Michael Rotti (1884–1894) built the pulpits to the side of the presbytery and the Tornaghi organ. In addition, the choir was equipped with stalls divided by fluted pilasters.

=== The 20th century enlargement ===
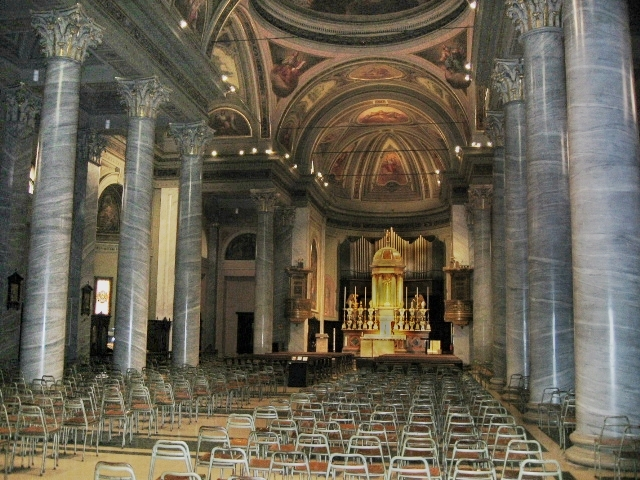
The interior of Saint Bartholomew Church

Since the completion of the frescoes made by Enrico Mariola under the supervision of Father Luigi Fumagalli (1898–1921), and the work of architect Leo Sorteni, the church had largely retained its appearance. This time however the church was enlarged by the decision of Archbishop Ildefonso Schuster, who had presented Sorteni to the parish priest, Father Giuseppe Camagni (1921–1957), on the occasion of the pastoral visit of 1937. Sorteni enlarged the building by stretching naves up to 42 metres (138 ft), and renovated the facade and built a new rectory. The works took a year and the church was consecrated by October 1939. In 1940 Vittorio Granchi painted more frescoes on the archways.

=== The 21st century ===
==== Restoration ====
After the second half of the twentieth century, the priests themselves took care of the maintenance and restoration of its frescoes. Father Franco Perlatti (1958–1994) took charge of the oldest ones. Father Giovanni Maraviglia (1994–2009) commissioned, between 1990 and 2005, to company GF Marcato the full restoration of the frescoes. In 1990, the chapels were restored, together with the presbytery and the dome; between 2002 and 2003, the aisles and the transept were restored, while the nave was restored between 2004 and 2005.

== Architecture and works of art ==
=== Interior ===
==== Architecture ====
The church, since 1939, presents a Latin cross shape. It is divided into three naves accessible by three doors on its facade. These aisles are 42 meters long and end in three different points of the building: the left aisle ends at the entrance of the sacristy, the nave reaches the chancel and the right aisle ends with a door. On the southern side of the church there are two other entrances. Among them, an entrance is located under the bell tower, which was built after the demolition of Ca de sciatt, which was an area reserved for people too poor and ashamed to go to church. The demolition of Ca de sciatt was ordered by Sorteni. The nave is divided from the side aisles by corinthian columns that support the vault in the gallery, designed by Sorteni. A large dome dominates the area from the transept to the chancel. In the church there are also two side chapels dedicated to Our Lady of the Rosary and Saint Joseph. The altar is dedicated to him and it is a late baroque work. The raised presbytery ends with a semicircular apse.

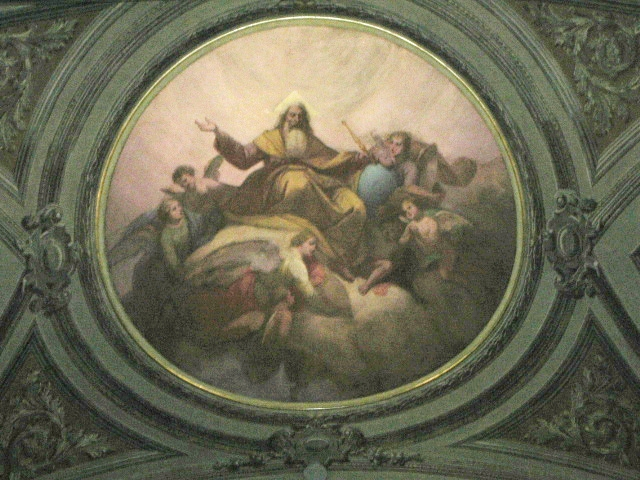
Giovanni Valtorta, Gloria dell'Eterno Padre, fresco on the dome of the presbytery.

===== Frescoes =====
Most of the frescoes were made between 1880 and 1940. Giovanni Valtorta frescoed the vault and decorated the sides of the presbytery with the representation of the Nativity and of the Deposition. In 1913 Enrico Mariola decorated some parts that were previously demolished after the work of Sorteni. The only one remaining to this day is the Annunciation fresco, located above the entrance to the sacristy. Vittorio Granchi decorated Sorteni's vaults with figures of saints and prophets. He painted the frescoes in the apses of the lateral chapels, too.

===== Tornaghi Organ, the sculptures and the canopy =====
Inside the church one can find other special artistic and devotional elements. The Tornaghi organ was built in 1859 and was restored between 2010 and 2013. The relics of the Magi are kept in a copy of the ancient shrine of the seventeenth century, made in light of the 400th anniversary of the transportation in the parish. The stained glass windows were made in 1937 by Gio Ponti, depicting the Martyrdom of St. Bartholomeus and the Adoration of the Magi. Wooden statues of the seventeenth century and of the twentieth century decorate the lateral chapels. The oldest depicts Saint Anthony of Padua. The canopy was built in 1845, commissioned by Don Nova, winning first place from the Imperial Royal Austrian Government.

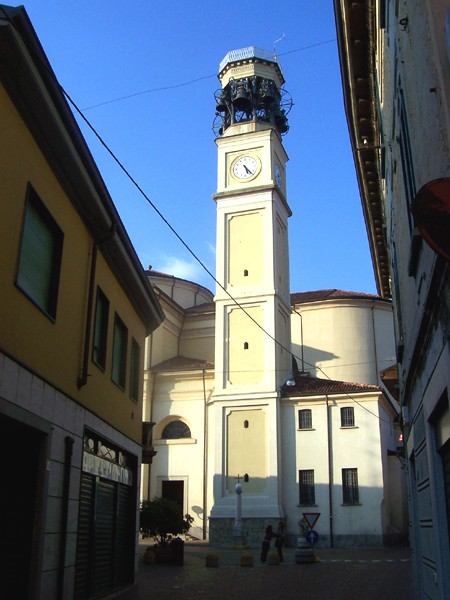
The church tower

=== Exterior ===
The exterior decorations are very simple, contrasting with the architectural style of the interior. The facade was built by Moraglia in neoclassical style. The only difference with the one built by Sorteni is the additional painting of the Three Kings. The current facade is marked by two rows of Ionic pilasters. The top of the structure is characterized by a gable pediment.

=== The church tower ===
Canon Antonio Francesco Frisi wrote about the church tower as a building constructed between 1751 and 1771 with funds provided by Count Pallavicini GianLuca, Governor of Milan, and the Marquis Silva. The bell tower is adorned with decorative pilasters. The structure is divided horizontally into four parts through the string courses. The last sector, under the belfry, has two clocks also described by De Petri in 1794. The belfry and the upper terrace fence have been reconstructed and repaired. At the time of pastor De Petri, there were only three bells, but during the nineteenth century Father Gioachino Farè (1820–1838), Gian Andrea and Giuseppe Nova Schieppati (1895–1898) had the belfry widened. Five bells were then added in 1836, six in 1838 and eight in 1897. Originally the octagonal terrace had a dome; after the changes done to the belfry, the former was also modified. In 1952 an automated mechanism for ringing the bells was installed.

== See also ==
- Church of Saint Ambrose

== Bibliography ==
- Movimento Terza Età (1992). Brugherio, la nostra gente (in Italian). Brugherio: Tipolitografia Brambilla.
- Porfidio, Vicky (2009). Brugherio, i suoi luoghi, la sua storia – 225º Anniversario del primo volo italiano in mongolfiera con uomini a bordo (in Italian). Brugherio: Comune di Brugherio.
- Cantù, Cesare (1858). Grande Illustrazione del Lombardo Veneto (in Italian). Vol. I. Milano: Corona e Caimi Editori.
- Virgilio, Giovanna (2004). Brugherio, percorsi tra storia e arte (in Italian). Cesano Maderno: ISAL.
- Tribuzio Zotti, Luciana; Magni, Giuseppe (2012). Una città nel segno dei Magi (in Italian). comunità pastorale Epifania del Signore, Associazione Kairòs.
- Tribuzio Zotti, Luciana (1986). Brugherio nei documenti (in Italian). Brugherio: circolo Paolo Grassi.
- Rapetti, Marco; Bertoni, Mauro; Castelli, Simona; et al. (1994). San Bartolomeo: una ricostruzione storica delle vicende della parrocchiale (in Italian). Brugherio: A.R.C.O.
- Comitato per le Feste (1910). S. Carlo Borromeo e Monza: memorie cittadine: pubblicate nel III centenario della canonizzazione (in Italian). Monza.
