= Carugate =

Carugate Carugaa (Lombard)
- Comune
- Comune di Carugatee
- Coat of arms

- Location within Italy Location within Lombardy
- Coordinates: 45°33′N 9°20′E
- Country: Italy
- Region: Lombardy
- Metropolitan city: Milan (MI)

Government
  - Mayor: Luca Maggioni

Area
  - Total: 5.4 km^{2} (2.1 sq mi)
- Elevation: 149 m (489 ft)

Population (31 May 2017)
  - Total: 15,368
  - Density: 2,800/km^{2} (7,400/sq mi)
- Demonym: Carugatesi
- Time zone: UTC+1 (CET)
  - Summer (DST): UTC+2 (CEST)
- Postal code: 20061
- Dialing code: 02
- Website: Official website

Carugate (Lombard: Carugaa [karyˈɡaː]) is a comune (municipality) in the Metropolitan City of Milan in the Italian region Lombardy, located about 15 kilometres (9 mi) northeast of Milan. Carugate borders the following municipalities: Agrate Brianza, Caponago, Brugherio, Pessano con Bornago, Bussero, Cernusco sul Naviglio.
