= Annoni =

Annoni is a surname. Notable people with the surname include:

- Alessandro Annoni (1770–1825), Italian politician
- Enrico Annoni (born 1966), Italian former professional footballer
- Francesco Maria Annoni (1610–1674), Italian Roman Catholic prelate
- John F. Annoni, Educator, gun rights advocate, author and outdoor mentor and activist
- Luigi Annoni (1890–1974), Italian racing cyclist
- Pietro Annoni (1886–1960), Italian rower
- Tiziano Annoni (born 1955), Italian sprint canoer
- Sébastien Annoni (born 1987), French artist, illustrator and art teacher

== See also ==
- Palazzo Annoni (also known as Palazzo Annoni-Cicogna Mozzoni) is a 17th-century Baroque building in Milan, Italy
- Villa Annoni, is a historical, 19th-century villa located in the Cuggiono municipality, Italy
