= Carlo Amati =

Italian architect (1776–1852)

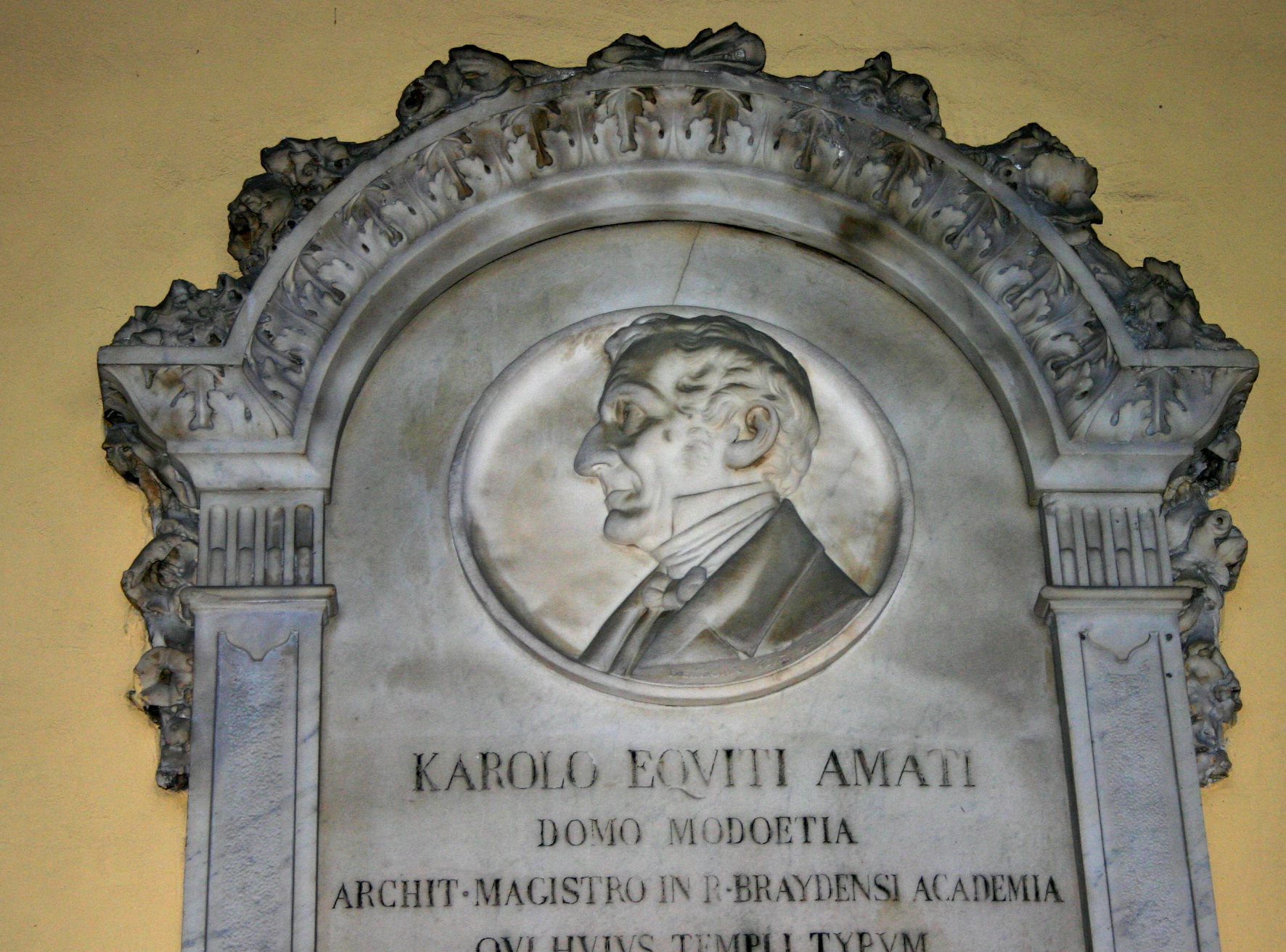
Monument to Carlo Amati at the church of San Carlo al Corso (Milan)

Carlo Amati (22 August 1776 – 23 March 1852) was an Italian architect and scholar.

== Biography ==
Born in Monza, Amati studied architecture at the Brera Academy, Milan, under Giuseppe Parini and Leopoldo Pollack. Amati became an assistant to the brothers Albertolli, Giocondo and Giacomo Albertolli, then under abbot Zanoia. Amati was a contemporary of Giacomo Moraglia. At the beginning of his career he was involved in the hurried completion (1806–13) of the façade of Milan Cathedral, which was carried out under the direction and with the collaboration of Zanoia.

The church of San Carlo al Corso (1838–47) in Milan was Amati’s most significant building. Here he grafted 16th-century motifs on to a centralized Roman plan in such a way as to recall both the Pantheon in Rome and the circular Milanese church of San Sebastiano, as well as Bramantesque models and the buildings frequently seen in the backgrounds of Renaissance paintings. The design for the church was part of a proposal (largely unexecuted) to reorder the entire centre of the city. Amati proposed that a vast arcaded square be opened up around the cathedral and that the Corsia dei Servi (now Corso Vittorio Emanuele) should be straightened to lead up to San Carlo, where another piazza, relating architecturally to the church, was proposed.

At the time when eclecticism was spreading in Italy and overturning accepted criteria of artistic quality, Amati advocated a return to Vitruvian principles. To this end he produced a series of publications devoted to Vignola, Vitruvius, Roman antiquities in Milan, and on archaeology. The completion of the church of San Carlo and Amati’s death, however, marked the end of the Neoclassical movement in Italy.

== Writings ==
- Gli ordini di architettura del Barozzi da Vignola (Milan, 1805)
- Apologia di Vitruvio Pollione (Milan, 1821)
- Dell’architettura di Marco Vitruvio Pollione libri dieci (Milan, 1829–30)
