= Moraglia =

Moraglia is a surname of a noble family that comes from Venice.

Notable people with this surname include:

- Francesco Moraglia (born 1953), Italian Roman Catholic Archbishop and current Patriarch of Venice
- Giacomo Moraglia (1791–1860), prolific Italian architect in the late Neoclassical period

== See also ==
- Mori
