= Porta Garibaldi (Milan) =

Coordinates: 45°28′51″N 9°11′13″E

- Quartier of Milan
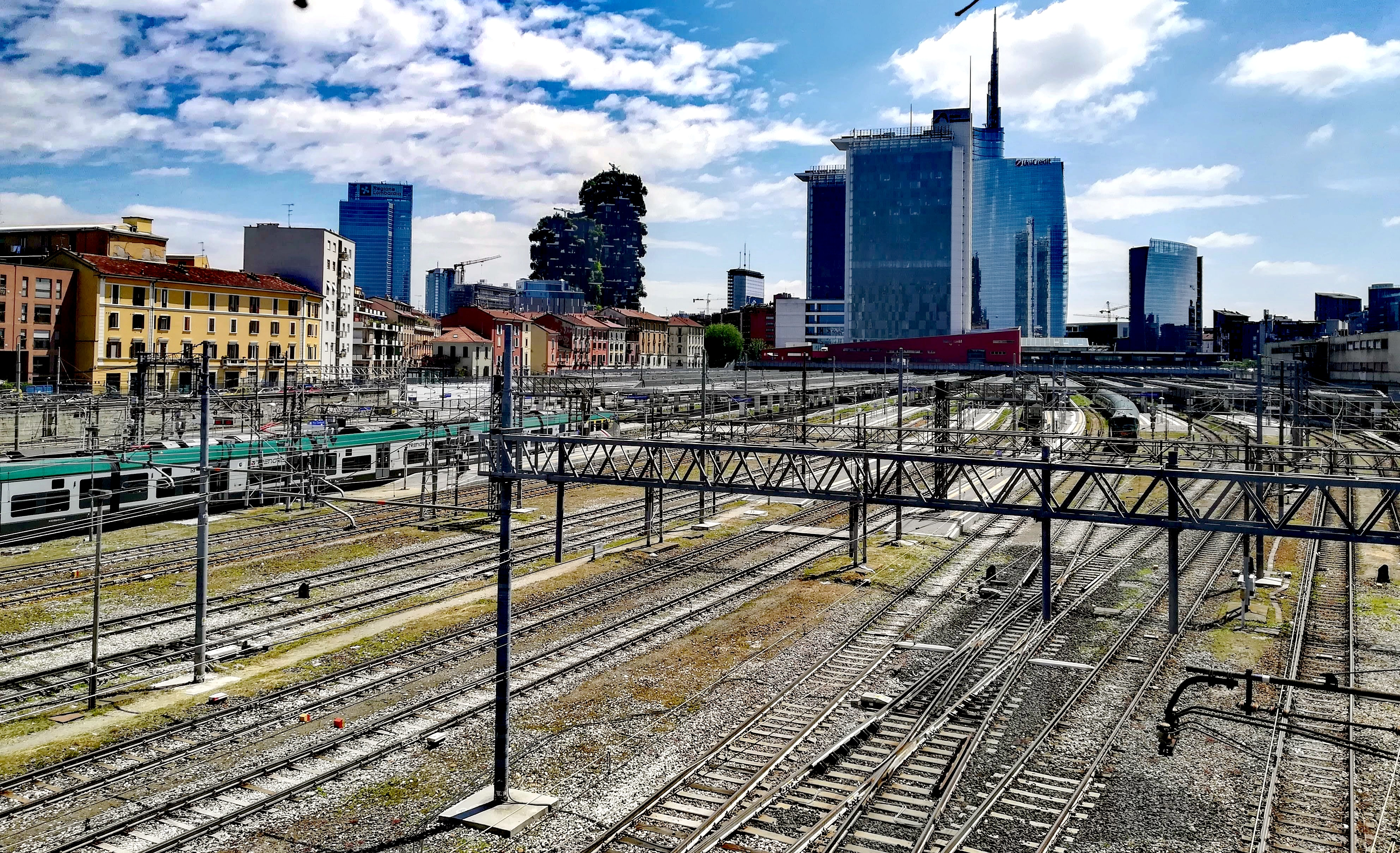
- The tracks of the Milano Porta Garibaldi railway station.
- Interactive map of Porta Garibaldi
- Country: Italy
- Region: Lombardy
- Province: Milan
- Comune: Milan
- Zone: 9
- Time zone: UTC+1 (CET)
  - Summer (DST): UTC+2 (CEST)

Porta Garibaldi (formerly Porta Comasina until 1860 ) is a borgho (neighborhood) that adjoins a gate that is part of Milan's ancient wall and gate system, built along the now demolished Spanish ramparts, also part of Milan's wall system, between which were built many palazzos.

Located north of the city, it was built by the merchants of the city.

The gate opens along the ancient road to Como. Characterized by the presence of a neoclassical arch built by Moraglia ( 1826-1827 ) and the adjoining toll booths ( 1834-1836 ), it stands in the center of Piazza XXV Aprile, at the mouth of the street Corso Garibaldi.

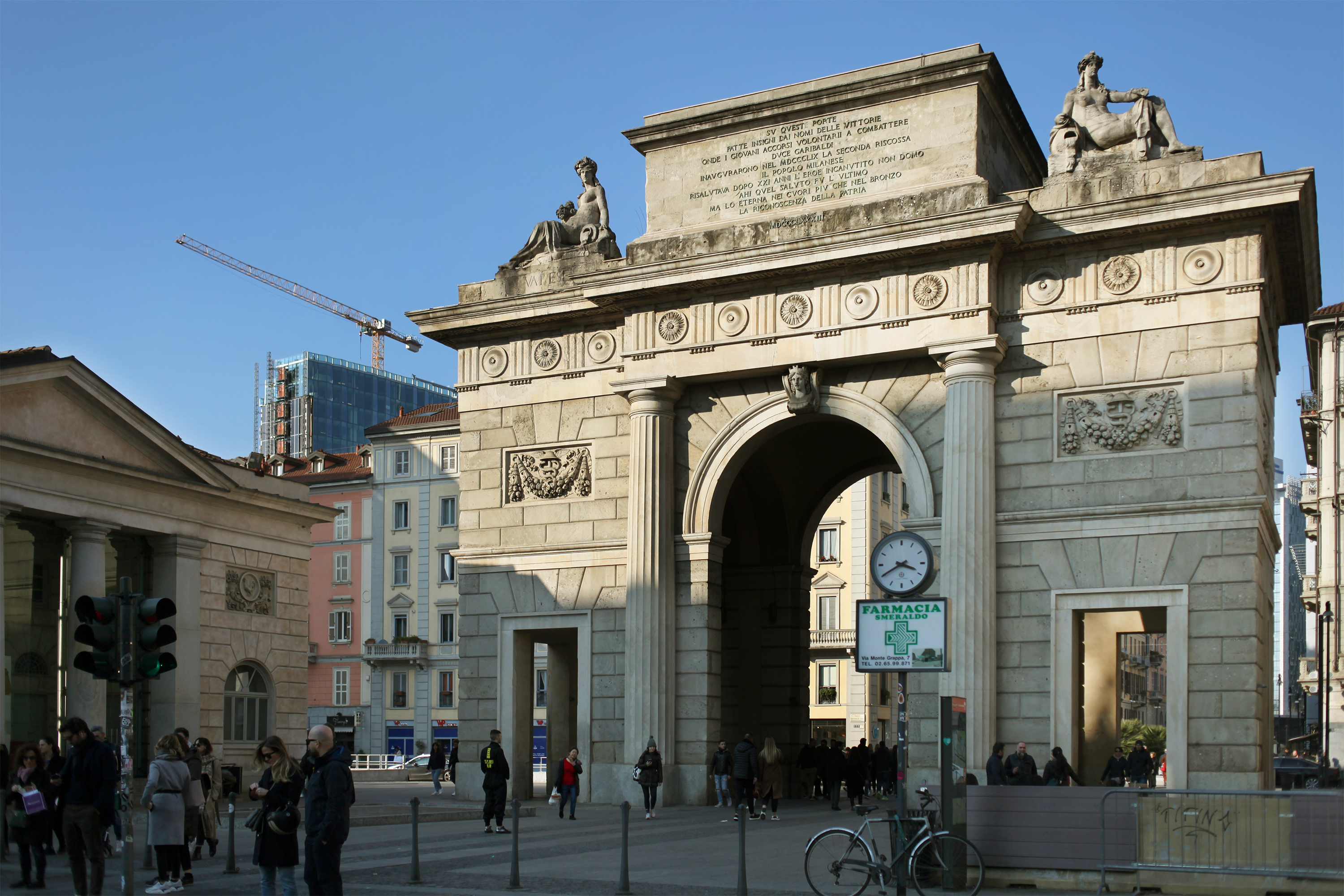
The arch of Porta Garibaldi, by Giacomo Moraglia

There is a significant Asian (Chinese and Filipino) immigrant community in the area.

== See also ==
- Porta Garibaldi (Milan city gate)
