= Saint Lucius, Brugherio =

Small church in Brugherio, Italy

Coordinates: 45.54769°N 9.29313°E

Saint Lucius (Chiesa di San Lucio)
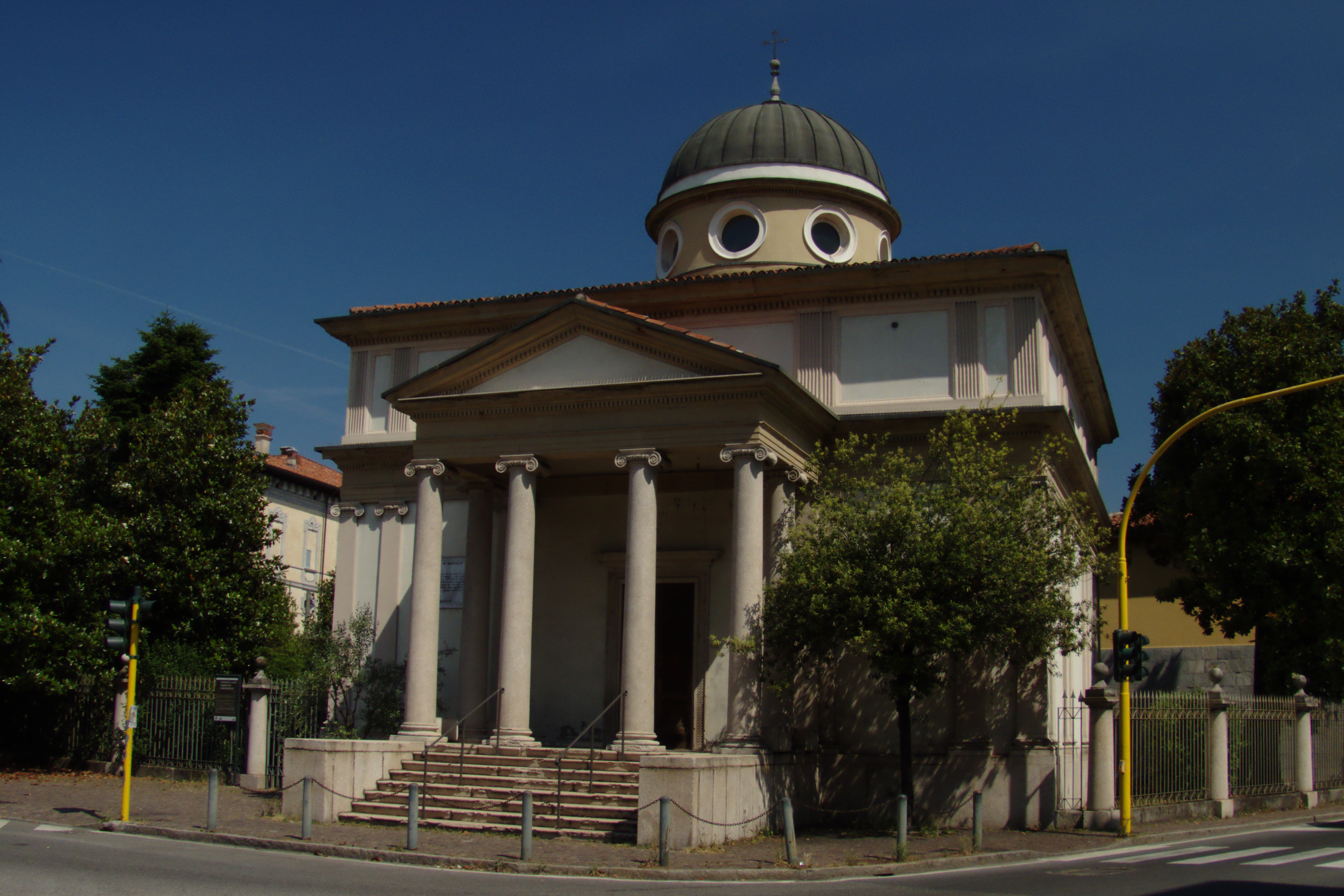
- Exterior view of the church

Religion
- Affiliation: Roman Catholic
- Diocese: Lombardy
- Province: Monza and Brianza

Location
- Location: Brugherio, Italy
- Interactive map of Saint Lucius (Chiesa di San Lucio)

Architecture
- Architects: Tommaso Rodari; Giocondo Albertolli
- Type: Church
- Style: Neoclassicism
- Groundbreaking: 1520
- Completed: 1542; 484 years ago

Saint Lucius in Brugherio, Italy, (Italian: Chiesa di San Lucio) is a small church dedicated to Saint Lucius in the grounds of the Villa Sormani. First located in Lugano, Switzerland, where it was a Franciscan chapel, the building was disassembled and transported to Brugherio, where its reconstruction was completed 17 years later.

== History ==
=== Origins and purchase by Count Andreani ===
Pope Lucius's shrine had been designed by Tommaso Rodari, an architect influenced by Bramante's style in Lombardy, or by Bramante himself. Built in Lugano, Switzerland, from 1520 to 1542 as Anthony of Padua's chapel, it was annexed to a Franciscan monastery. It is clear that the building was initially located in the Swiss city as evidenced by Giulio Pocobelli's inscription of 1813 and by Lugano's depiction from the 17th century. After Napoleon's suppression of religious orders, in 1812 it was auctioned by the Gran Consiglio of Canton Ticino, and bought by Natale Albertolli, a rich businessman who was the brother of architect Giocondo Albertolli. Impressed by the shrine's beauty, he managed to prevent its demolition by his brother Natale who had planned to use its materials. Albertolli owed his success to its purchase by Gian Mario Andreani (1760–1830), the brother Count Paolo Andreani, the first man in Italy to fly a balloon. He asked Albertolli to "bring" the church close to the Villa in Moncucco.

=== Giocondo Albertolli and reconstruction ===
In order to transport the chapel from Lugano to Moncucco, Albertolli developed an extremely risky and laborious plan. He first disassembled it, then he rebuilt it near count Gian Mario's Villa Sormani. After it had been dismantled, he had the pieces shipped over Lake Lugano and then transported by land to Como. The pieces travelled over ten kilometers through the Naviglio della Martesana arriving at the river port of "Mattalino Bridge", where they were unloaded near Count Andreani's property. The work took 17 years, from 1815–16 until after 1832. The chapel, once dedicated to Anthony of Padua, now that it was by detached from the monastery, it was called the "little church of Moncucco" which was dedicated to Saint Lucius.

=== Acquisition by Sormani to restoration in 1992–94 ===
Gian Mario did not see the work completed as he died in 1830. The chapel was then included as a piece of property under the Villa Sormani. It was first owned by Gian Mario's cousin, Count Sormani. Thereafter, at the end of the 19th century, Umberto I and Margherita of Savoy attended mass in the chapel. Villa Sormani and the little church's last owners, the Stanzani family, decided to sell the complex to the Brugherio Commune in 1987, which from 1992 to 1994 restored the chapel to its former appearance. In 1994, it was reopened in the presence of the authorities of both cities, owing to a fostered cultural relationship between them.

== Description ==
=== Exterior ===
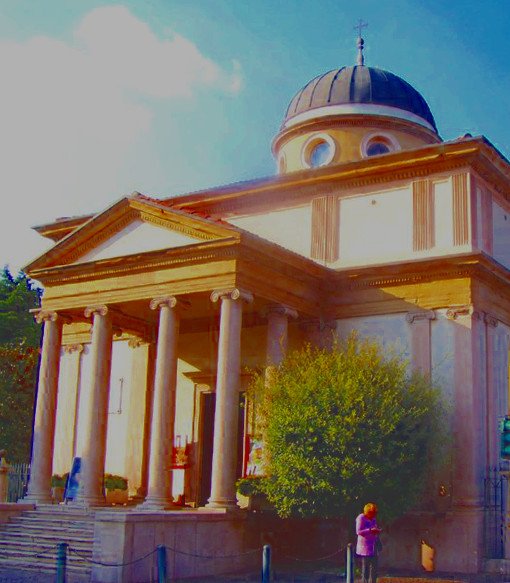
The Exterior

Unlike the original building, after its relocation and reconstruction the church's exterior was decorated. Since the little church was to be used as a noble family's place of worship rather than a Franciscan chapel, Albertolli decided to enhance the exterior with Neoclassical features to compensate for its plain appearance. The building, with a quadrangular layout, stands on a high base, a wide stairway leading up to the Neoclassical tetrastyle entrance; on the opposite (north) side, there is a sacristy. These additions were needed to compensate for the absence of the original complex to which the chapel was attached. The facade is marked by ionic pillars that support the triangular tympanum on a cornice bearing an attic; furthermore, the chapel is crowned by a circular tambour and a hemispherical dome.

=== Interior ===
The interior is the same as it used to be in Lugano, consisting of a combination of sacred and profane components. On one side there are 24 medals depicting saints (completed between 1520 and 1542 as indicated by the inscriptions on the medals as well as those on the columns) while on the other side can be found mythological decorations. Of special note is the bas-relief Cristo in pietà at the top of the dome. Finally, placed on a parapet, the altar is decorated with paintings of the four evangelists on the sides of the tabernacle, which is surmounted by a portrait of Saint Lucius.

== See also ==
- Villa Sormani
- 16th-century Western domes

== Bibliography ==
- Movimento Terza Età (1992). Brugherio: la nostra gente (in Italian). Brugherio: Comune di Brugherio.
- Albertolli, Giocondo (1833). Cenni storici sovra una capella antica ricostruita in oratorio a Moncucco nella provincia di Milano (in Italian). Milano: Pietro Vallardi.
- Bianconi, Piero (1973). Il tempietto di Sant'Antonio da Padova a Lugano (in Italian). Lugano: Stampatore Giulio Topi.
- Gamba, Ermis (18 June 2004). Andreani, famiglia (in Italian).
- Virgilio, Giovanna (2004). Brugherio, percorsi tra storia e arte (in Italian). Cesano Maderno: ISAL.
- Cazzaniga, Giovanni; Valli, Laura; Vercesi, Ermanno (1995). Il Tempietto dell'amicizia: cronaca delle giornate dedicate alla riapertura del Tempietto di Moncucco in Brugherio : Brugherio 15/18 settembre 1994, Lugano 18 marzo 1995 (in Italian). Brugherio: Comune di Brugherio.
- Valli, Laura; Cannella, Calogero (1994). Il tempietto di Moncucco. Restauro e considerazioni sull'ex oratorio dei conti Andreani-Sormani in Brugherio già cappella di S.Antonio presso il Convento di S. Francesco in Lugano (in Italian). Lugano and Brugherio's Municipality.
- Valli, Laura (1989). Il viaggio di pietra (in Italian). Brugherio: Comune di Brugherio.
- Mezzanotte, Paolo (1960). Giocondo Albertolli (in Italian). Vol. 1. Treccani.
