= Moncucco (disambiguation) =

Moncucco is a hamlet of Brugherio municipality, in Italy.

Moncucco may also refer to other places in Italy:

- Moncucco Torinese is a municipality in province of Asti
- Moncucco is one of the Garbagna Novarese farmsteads
