= Villa Sormani =

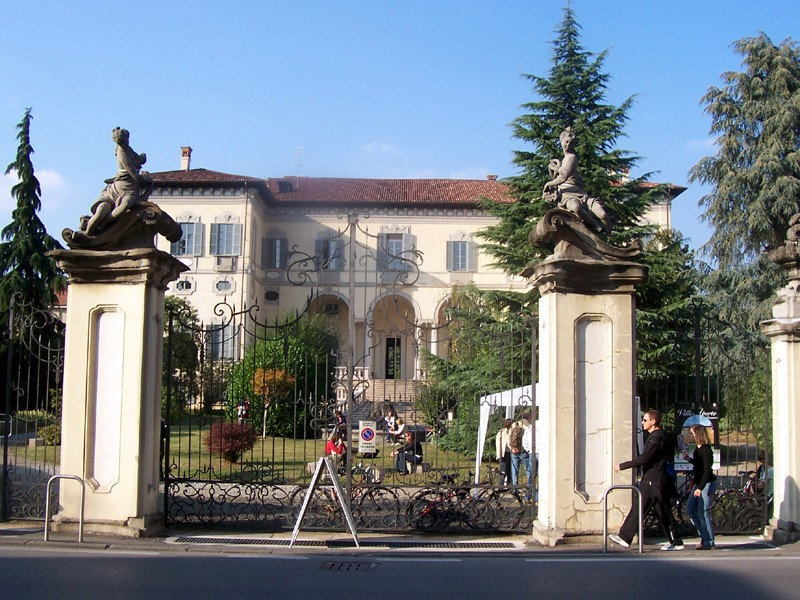
- Villa Sormani
- Interactive map of the Villa Sormani area

General information
- Architectural style: Milanese Baroque
- Location: Via San Maurizio al Lambro 8, Brugherio, Italy
- Coordinates: 45.54821°N 9.292°E
- Current tenants: private
- Completed: 1733
- Client: Count Charles Joseph Bolagnos

Design and construction
- Architect: Giovanni Ruggeri

The baroque Villa Sormani is in the village of Moncucco in the city of Brugherio. The Villa Sormani was the site chosen by Count Paolo Andreani to demonstrate the first public balloon flight on Italian soil in 1784. In the grounds is a church that was moved from Switzerland.

== History ==
It is said that there was once a castle here that sat on the small rise surrounded by countryside.

The villa was built in 1733 for Count Charles Joseph Bolagnos by the Milanese architect Giovanni Ruggeri who worked in the Baroque style. It was sold in 1779 to the Andreani family. The house contained their painting collection which featured works by Canaletto.

In 1784 the villa was owned by Gian Mario Andreani whose younger brother had an interest in balloons following the first flight in France in 1783. In 1817 the building was left in a will to Joseph Sormani who was a cousin of the Andreani family. In 1913 it was sold to the Verri family and in the 1980s it was sold by the Stanzani family to the current owners.

== Description ==
The present two storey building is of a uniform height and the hipped roof is tiled. The original form of the building was a U shape with the main façade facing the town centre. One of the main features is the wide stairway leading up to the pillars flanking the main entrance into the garden.

The grounds also contain the Saint Lucius Church, also known as the Little Church of Moncucco (tempietto di San Lucio in Moncucco). This building was moved here by the Andreani family at the instigation of the architect Giocondo Albertolli. Abertolli had found that the building at a convent in Lugano was to be demolished and he persuaded his patron to have it dismantled and rebuilt here. Over seventeen years the building was dismantled and transported to Brugheri via wagons and a canal. Abertolli made changes to the design and it was re-dedicated to Saint Lucius and reopened in 1832. This building was restored in 1994.

The main building was renovated in the 1980s when the interior was subdivided to create several separate residences.

== First Italian balloon flight ==
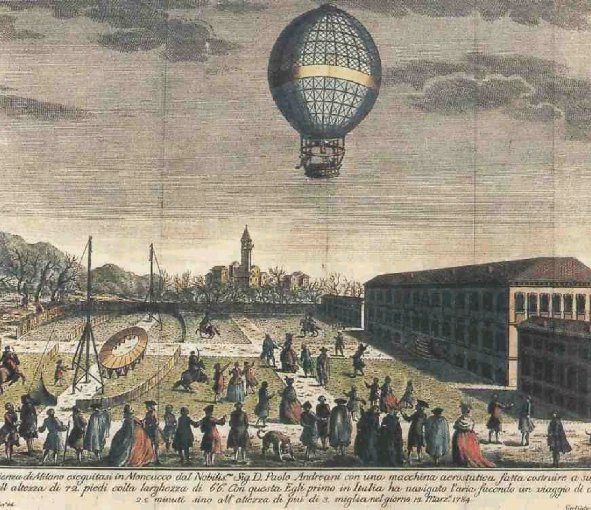
Paolo Andreani da Moncucco in 1784

Paolo Andreani had seen a model balloon built by Agostino Gerli and his brothers ascend a few feet powered by hot air. Andreani undertook to fund the Gerli brothers to build a much larger hot-air balloon with a diameter of 23 m (75 ft) that would be capable of allowing a man to take to the air. The balloon took 24 days to make and its laden weight was about 1,300 kg (2,900 lb). The first flight was on 25 February 1784. An invited crowd then gathered on 13 March 1784 at the Villa Sormani which was his brother's residence. The spectators saw Andreani and two of his assistants ascend to a height of over 1,500 m (4,900 ft) whilst the balloon travelled several kilometres. The emperor who missed the spectacle arranged for a medal to be made. The medal featured Gerli's balloon on one side and Andreani on the other to commemorate the ascent.

== See also ==
- Paolo Andreani
- Saint Lucius Church
