= Giacomo Moraglia =

Italian architect

- Born: June 7, 1791; Milan, Duchy of Milan
- Died: 1 February 1860 (aged 68); Milan. Kingdom of Lombardy–Venetia
- Education: Brera Academy
- Occupation: Architect
- Known for: Porta Comasina; Palazzo Melzi d'Eril, Milan

Giacomo Moraglia (7 June 1791 – 1 February 1860) was an Italian architect in the late Neoclassical period, remembered above all for his Porta Comasina (now Porta Garibaldi) in Milan. A prolific architect, he completed hundreds of projects and restored many buildings including hospitals, factories, churches, schools, theatres and residences.

== Biography ==
=== Early life and education ===
Giacomo Moraglia studied architecture and design at Milan's Brera Academy under Giocondo Albertolli, Carlo Amati and Giuseppe Zanoia. Aafter winning a scholarship went to Rome (1817–20), where he pursued advanced architectural studies. He then returned to Milan and in 1821 qualified as an architect. He was accredited by Milan's powerful planning committee, the Commissione d’Ornato di Milano.

=== Career ===
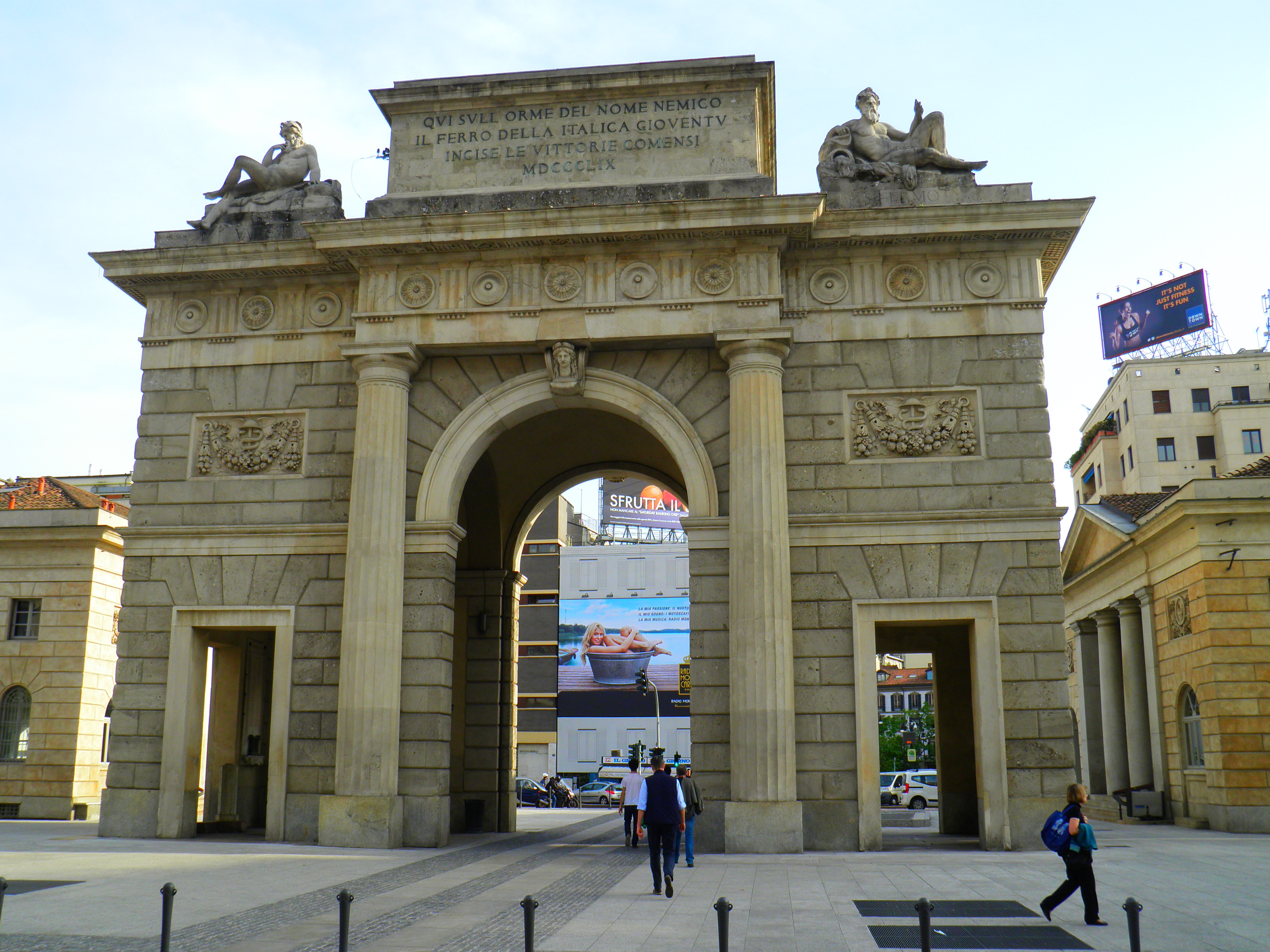
Porta Comasina, Milan, 1826

Moraglia was among the most active professional architects in Milan during the 19th century, working almost exclusively in Lombardy and in Ticino, Switzerland, but there is as yet no comprehensive record of his architecture apart from his work for the Church. An early civil commission was the triumphal arch originally dedicated to the Emperor Francis I at the Milanese customs barrier at Porta Comasina (1825–6; now the Porta Garibaldi), and completed with the signalmen's houses between 1834 and 1836. The scheme combined picturesque effects with a formal Neoclassicism that was typical of all his work.

Moraglia also designed industrial architecture, notable examples being the Kramer Press (1825) in Milan and Count Calderara's sugar refinery, where he reconciled Neoclassicism with the functional demands of production. A similar commitment to functional considerations can be seen in the plans (1837) for the Ospedale Civile at Sondrio, in which he introduced technological and organizational refinements.

Moraglia was, however, primarily an architect of churches, and the plans of most of them are based on a Greek cross with the central space covered by a low spherical dome; examples include San Gerardo (1836) in Monza; San Vittore (1844) in Missaglia; the parish church of San Carlo ( 1846 ) in Magadino, Switzerland; and the Oratory (1855) of the Villa Carlotta in Tremezzo on Lake Como. The decorations were designed in the most academically classical style, almost untouched by the contemporary debate on eclecticism or the search for a new style. He sometimes used proto-Renaissance forms that in Milan were called ‘Bramantesque’, for example in the reconstruction of the nave (1836) of Santa Maria dei Miracoli at Cantù, but he was mainly faithful to Neoclassical formulae despite having clerical patrons with considerable importance in cultural matters.

For Monsignor Luigi Biraghi he designed the Collegio delle Marcelline (1837–9) at Cernusco sul Naviglio and for Monsignor Antonio Rosmini he built the Collegio dei Padri Rosminiani (1842–7) at Stresa. He was also the architect to the seminaries of the diocese of Milan, and in that capacity, from 1840, he supervised numerous alterations and restorations to the Seminario della Canonica in Milan and those of Seveso, Pollegio and Monza.

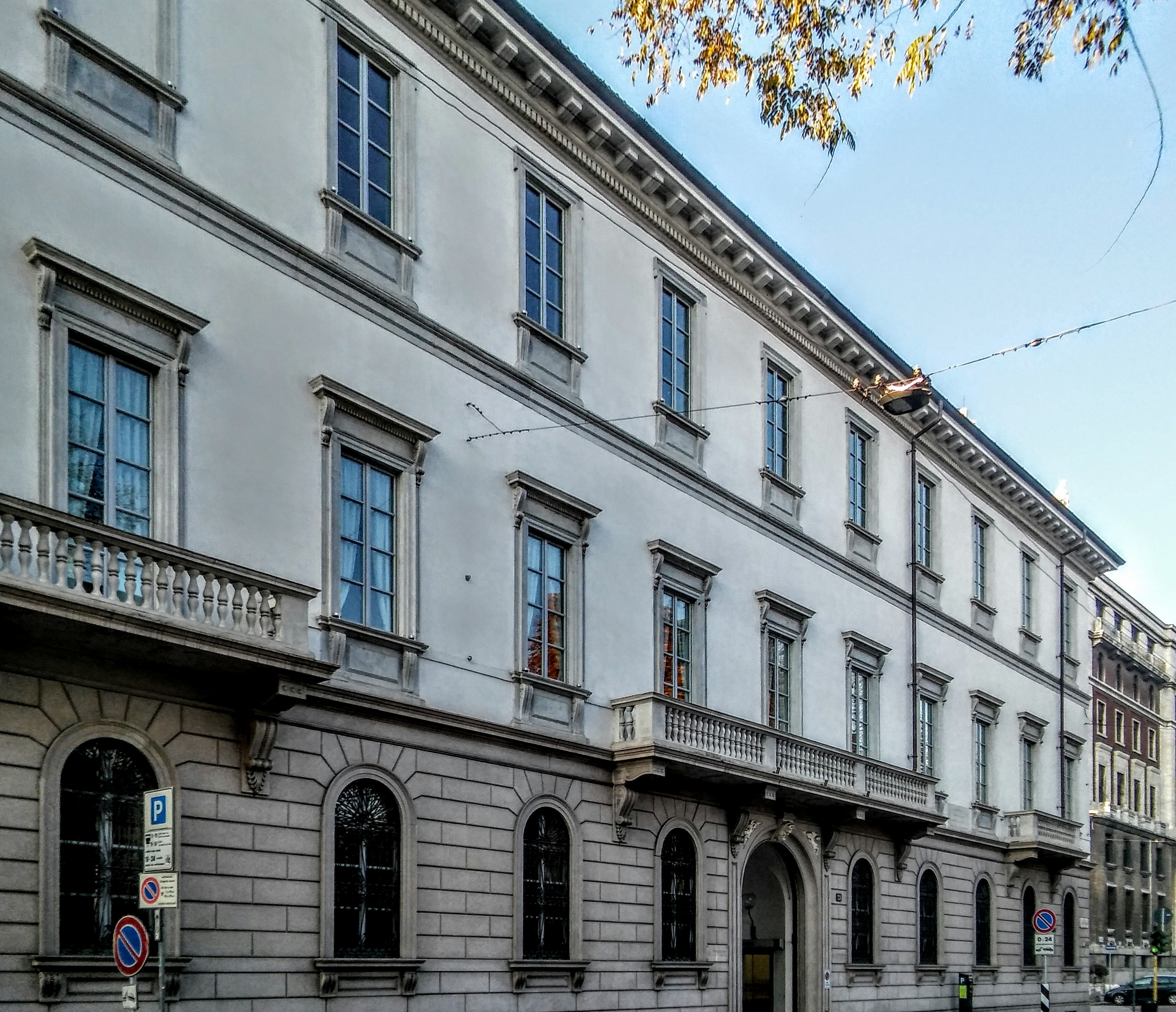
Palazzo Melzi d'Eril, Milan, 1841–6

Moraglia planned numerous country villas and town houses, probably the most important being the Palazzo Melzi d'Eril in the Via Manin, Milan, built between 1841 and 1846 as an adaptation of existing buildings. Here Moraglia's austere language and ability to obtain pictorial effects with extreme economy of means reveal the client's desire to express himself and his social position.

A similar language can be seen in the exterior design of the almost contemporary Palazzo Governativo (1844–5) in Lugano, Switzerland, the imposing volume of which is divided into façades articulated by bands of ashlar. The palazzo is planned around a solemn court decorated with two orders, in which there is an echo of Palladio’s classicism mediated through early 17th-century Milanese examples. In Ticino Moraglia built also the Teatro Sociale (1847) of Bellinzona, and the Villa Ghisler (1844) in Magadino.

In 1839 Moraglia became a Socio d’Arte at the Brera Academy and in 1841 a member of the Commissione d’Ornato di Milano. He died in Milano on 1 February 1860. Perhaps the last of his many projects was the church in Monte Olimpino (1857), north of (Como). Of his numerous sons, only Pietro Moraglia followed his father's career, and he completed his unfinished works.

== Select works ==
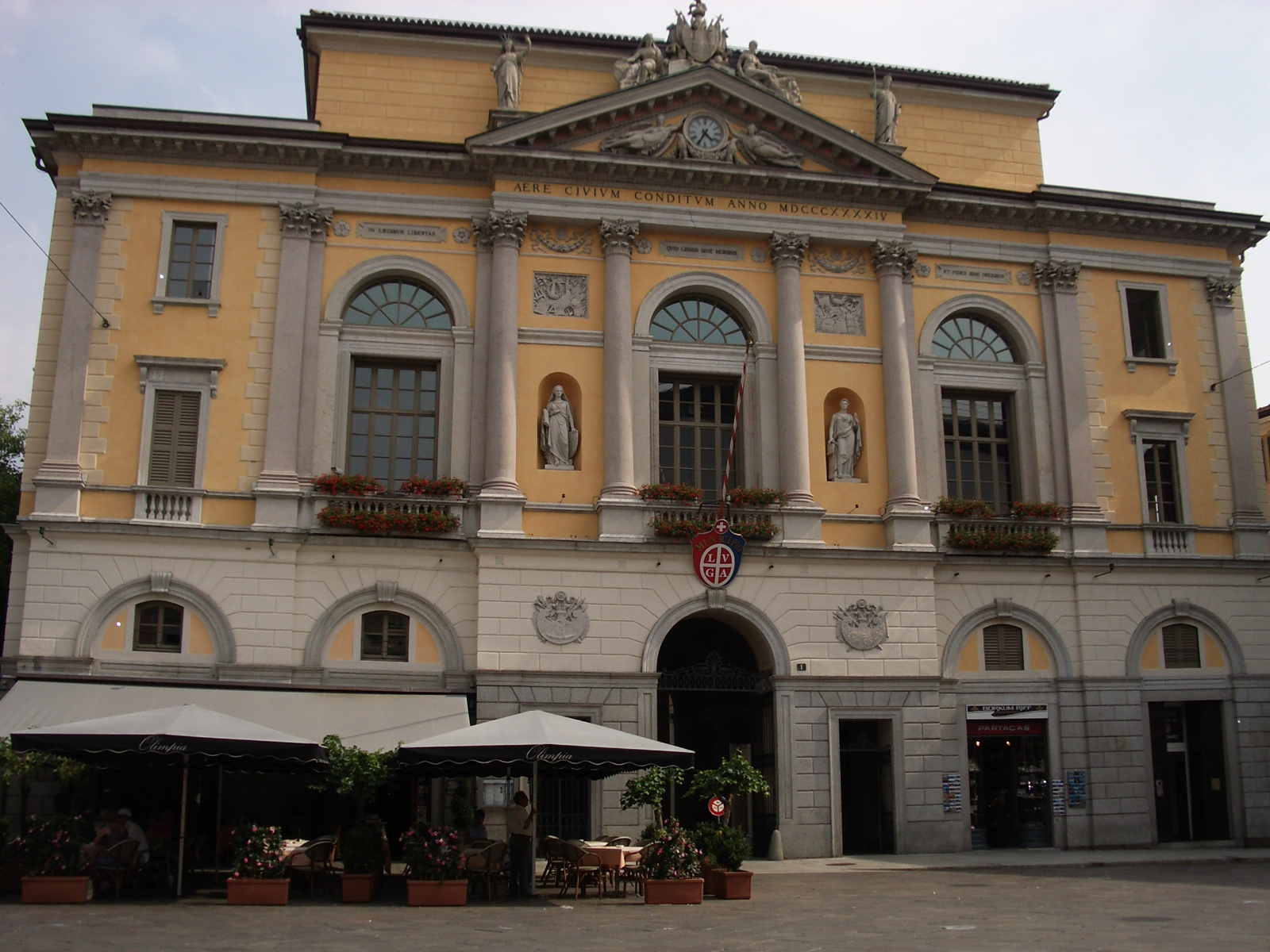
Town hall of Lugano, 1844–5

- Collegio Calchi Taeggi, Milan
- Palazzo Melzi d'Eril, Milan
- Porta Comasina, Milan
- San Felice, Velate
- San Gerardo, Monza
- San Michele, Oreno
- San Vittore, Missaglia
- Santa Giustina, Milan
- Santa Maria Assunta, Guanzate
- Santa Maria Assunta, Mezzago

== Bibliography ==
- Negri, Antonello (1982). "Inizi e sviluppi di un'architettura dell'industria a Milano". Archeologia industriale in Lombardia: Milano e la bassa padana (in Italian). Milan. pp. 105–9.
- Melzi d’Eril, Giulio (1987). Palazzo Melzi d’Eril alla Cavalchina in Milano (in Italian). Milan: Leasindustria.
