= Villa Annoni =

Villa in Cuggiono, Italy

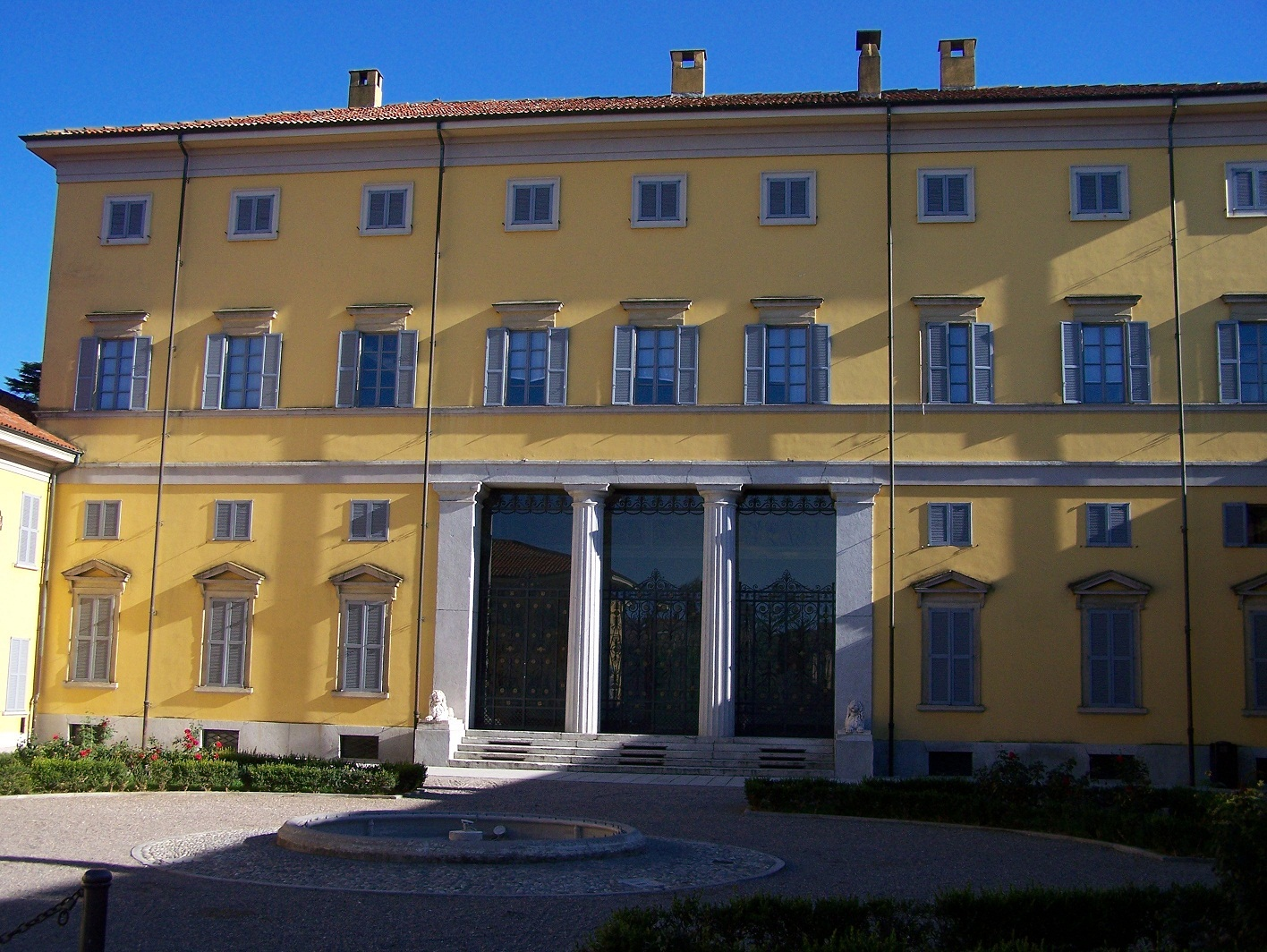
- Façade of Villa Annoni, in the Cuggiono municipality
- Interactive map of the Villa Annoni area

General information
- Status: In use
- Type: Renaissance Villa, used as a public office and museum
- Architectural style: Neoclassic
- Location: Cuggiono, Italy, Piazza XXV Aprile
- Coordinates: 45°30′15″N 8°49′00″E
- Current tenants: Public building
- Named for: Alessandro Annoni
- Construction started: 1805
- Completed: 1809
- Renovated: 1987
- Owner: Municipality of Cuggiono

Design and construction
- Architect: Leopoldo Pollack Giuseppe Zanoia

Villa Annoni is a historical, 19th-century villa located in the Cuggiono municipality, in the greater Milan urban area. Since 2007, the buildings have housed municipal public offices and a museum.

== History ==
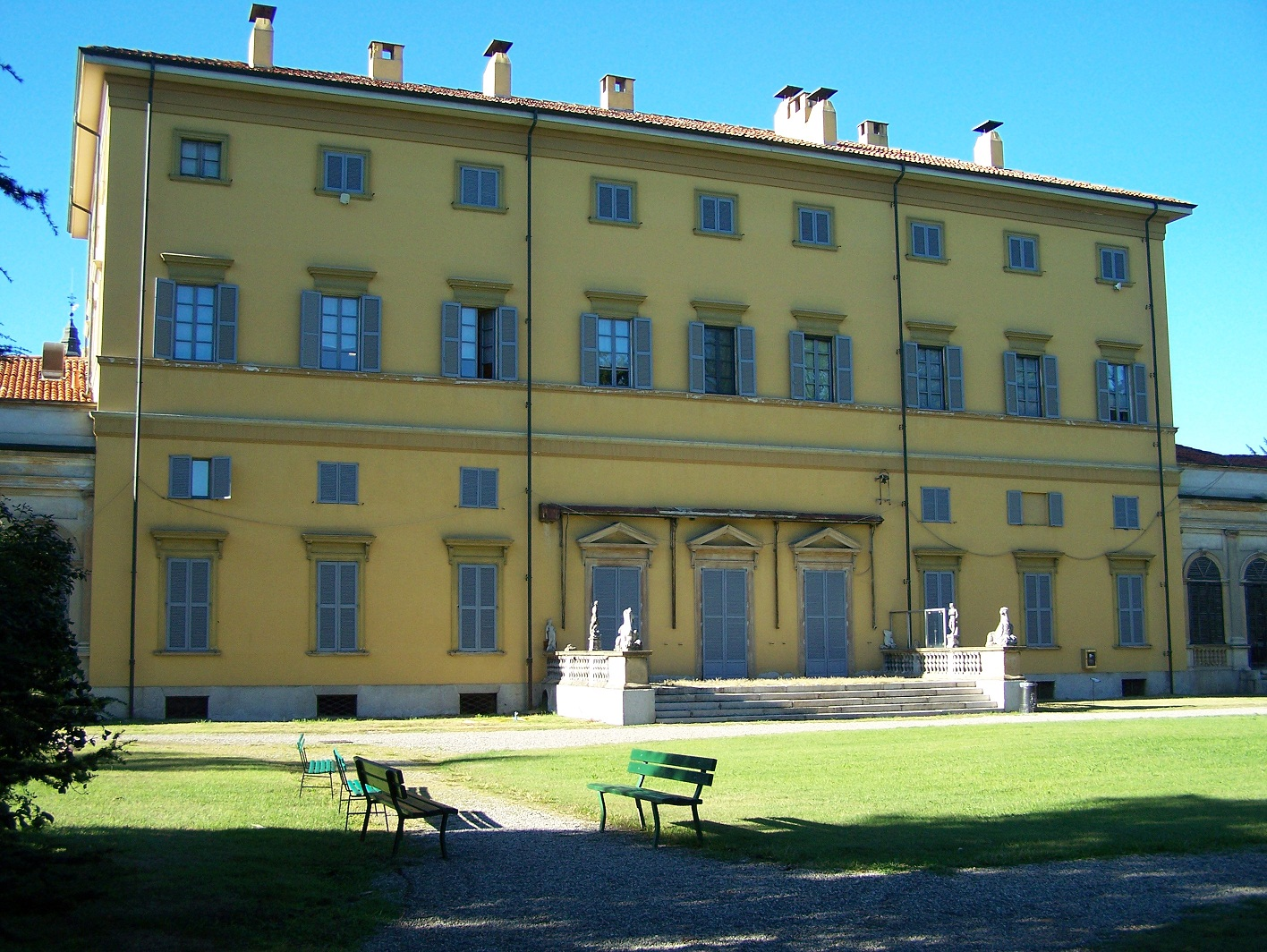
Villa Annoni: side facing the park

The neoclassic villa was commissioned in the early 1800s by Alessandro Annoni, a wealthy Milanese who owned a sizable amount of land in the town of Cuggiono. As it was common at the time for families not belonging to the nobility, the Annonis sought to emulate certain habits of noble families, one of which was the construction of "majestic" villas. The family had risen in status through their service to the Napoleonic regime, and was then attempting to have their position fully recognized in society.

The Annonis descended from Paolo Annoni, a wealthy banker who lived in the 17th century and conceived their residence in Cuggiono as the ultimate showcase of their wealth. In keeping with the neoclassic style, the villa was built with great pomp and on a monumental scale.

The original idea to build a villa in Cuggiono is attributed to Alessandro's father, Giovanni, who started buying land in the late 1700s with a view to expand on the family's existing estate in the area. The villa would only be built, however, by his son Alessandro, who commissioned a well-known Milanese architect, Leopold Pollack, who was often engaged by the Austrian nobility.
