= Leopoldo Pollack =

Italian architect (1751–1806)

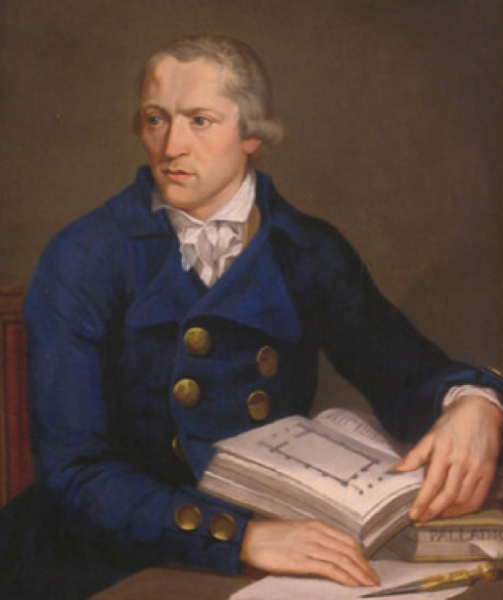
- Portrait of Leopoldo Pollack
- Born: 1751; Vienna, Archduchy of Austria
- Died: 13 March 1806 (aged 54–55); Milan, Kingdom of Italy
- Occupation: Architect
- Movement: Neoclassicism
- Buildings: Villa Annoni; Villa Belgiojoso Bonaparte

Leopoldo Pollack (1751 – 13 March 1806) was an Austrian-born Italian architect who was active in Milan where he became one of the leading proponents of Neoclassical architecture.

== Career ==
=== Life ===
Leopoldo Pollack was born in 1751. He was the son of a master mason in the Imperial Office of Works in Vienna. He was trained by Paul Ulrich Trientl before attending courses at the Vienna Academy under Vinzenz Fischer. After arriving in Milan in 1775, he became a pupil of Giuseppe Piermarini with whom he also collaborated. In 1776 he became a student at the Brera Academy.

Pollack was appointed Treasurer of State Buildings and assisted Piermarini both with his teaching duties and public building commissions. He taught perspective at the Accademia and in 1786 was made Professor of the Elements of Architecture.

As state architect Pollack was mainly engaged in adapting the many religious buildings made redundant by the reforms of Joseph II. The fine drawings Pollack made for these projects are proof of the enormous care he paid to the internal layouts. At Pavia he converted the hospital church into a ward for the sick (1782), while the convent of San Felice was adapted to serve as a seminary (1790). He converted the monastic buildings of Santa Chiara (1787), Lodi, San Quirico, Cremona, and Santa Maria Maddalena (1788), Mantua, into orphanages.

In 1796, when the French arrived in Milan, he was dismissed from the Accademia owing to his links with the Viennese court, lost his post as official architect and was briefly imprisoned. In 1803, however, he was appointed surveyor to the fabric of Milan Cathedral. In 1805, as surveyor to the fabric of Milan Cathedral, Pollack began preparations for the construction of the façade, the design for which he had already completed in 1787. He sought to harmonize the existing 16th-century elements with the Gothic character of the building and to simplify the composition by removing the bell tower and the traditional entrance portico. After his death, the work was completed by Carlo Amati and Giuseppe Zanoia.

=== Early work ===
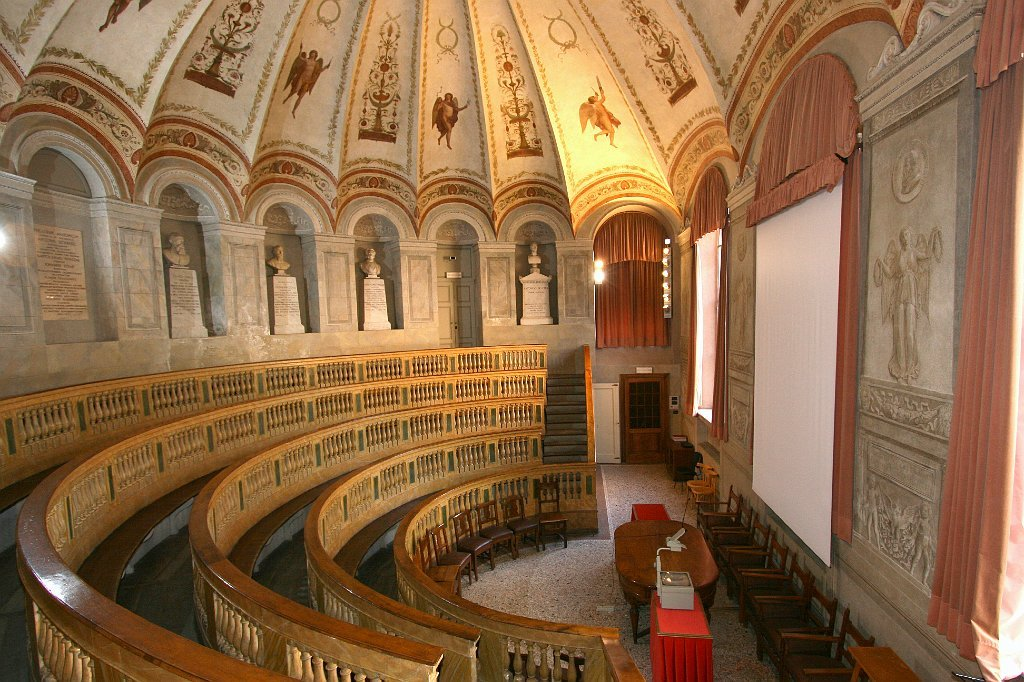
Anatomical theatre of the University of Padua, 1785

Initially, Pollack’s professional activity was completely subordinated to that of Piermarini, with whom he collaborated on restructuring the church of the Collegio Elvetico (1777) and the Royal Palace of Milan (from 1776), and on building the Palazzo Greppi (1775) and Palazzo Belgioioso (1776–8), all in Milan. In Pavia he was responsible for the University buildings: the anatomical theatre (1785), the theology portico (1785) and the physics theatre (1785–7) were all built to his designs. The physics theatre, completed in 1787, includes a series of Ionic semi-columns and niches with statues of Galileo Galilei and Bonaventura Cavalieri. In Monza Pollack collaborated on the construction of the Villa Regio-Ducale (1776–80).

=== Mature work ===
Subsequently, Pollack developed his career on an independent basis, and his architecture exhibited a more individual character. He grafted a taste for richer ornament on to Piermarini’s rationalism, evolving a restrained pomp and developing motifs drawn from international Neoclassicism. At the same time, his continuing contacts with Vienna and Budapest kept him in touch with the Baroque tradition.

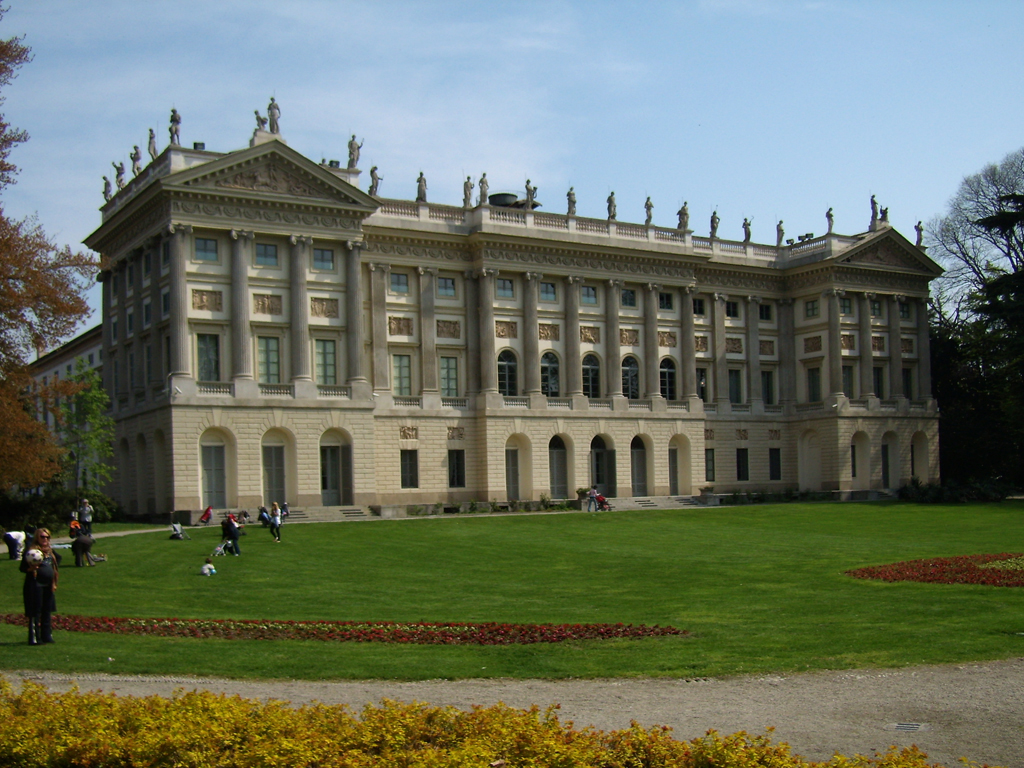
Pollack's Royal Villa of Milan (1796)

The remarkable décor of Pollack’s interiors was designed with exceptional attention to detail and an understanding of the function of the rooms. Villa and garden design appealed to him most, and he achieved his greatest success in these areas. The Villa Belgiojoso (1790–96; now Villa Reale) is laid out like a Parisian hôtel, with a screen wall between low-rise side wings, which lead back to the main corps de logis. Clearly influenced by Palladianism and French trends, it has a rusticated base, a giant order of columns and is topped with a series of statues. The garden front displays the full pomp of French classicism in an elevation that recalls Ange-Jacques Gabriel’s palaces (1753) on the Place de la Concorde, Paris, although Pollack used Ionic rather than Corinthian columns. Pollack also designed the English landscape garden behind the mansion. The garden was the first of its kind to be created in Milan, and it proved both popular and influential.

=== Later career ===
Pollack’s stylistic idiosyncrasies became more accentuated in successive works, for example the Villa Mezzabarba (1791–6), Casatisma, an adaptation of an earlier structure, the Villa Rocca Saporiti at Borgovico, near Como, the Villa Casati (1790s) at Muggiò, the Villa Pesenti–Agliardi (1798–1801) at Sombreno, Bergamo, and the Villa Amalia (1801) at Erba, which was built on an old convent. When he was not constrained by pre-existing structures, as at Como and Muggiò, Pollack adopted a scheme in which the villa is dominated centrally by a domed, oval room that stands out on the exterior and is richly decorated with stuccowork. The interiors give full expression to his decorative taste, and the English-style gardens are laid out with pleasant arbours, artificial ruins, bridges, tempietti and obelisks, alternating open areas with pools and fountains.

=== Theatre design ===
Pollack was also successfully involved in theatre design. Early in his career he had collaborated in building the Teatro Patriottico (1798; later Teatro dei Filodrammatici), Milan, for which he also designed a façade. In his unexecuted plans for the Court Theatre at Vienna (1794), the Teatro Grande (1805), Brescia, and above all the Teatro Sociale (1803), Bergamo, which was completed in 1815 by his son Giuseppe Pollack (1779–1857), he followed the lines established by Piermarini at the Teatro alla Scala (1776–8), Milan: a horseshoe auditorium, a timber internal structure and ceiling, an antechamber to each box, a spacious entrance lobby with an upper-level foyer and a porte-cochère.

== Gallery ==
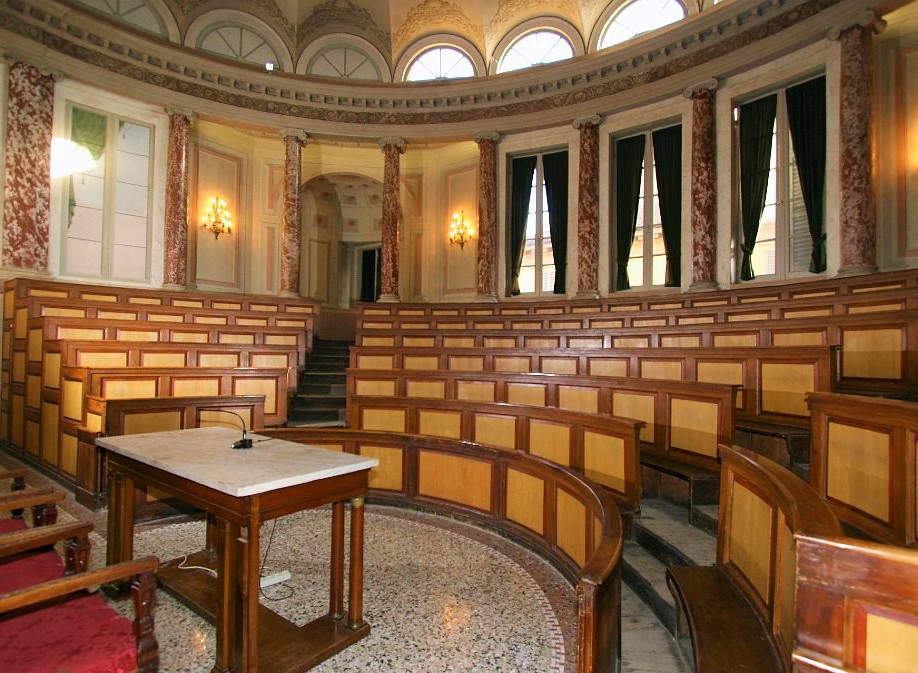
Physics theatre, University of Pavia

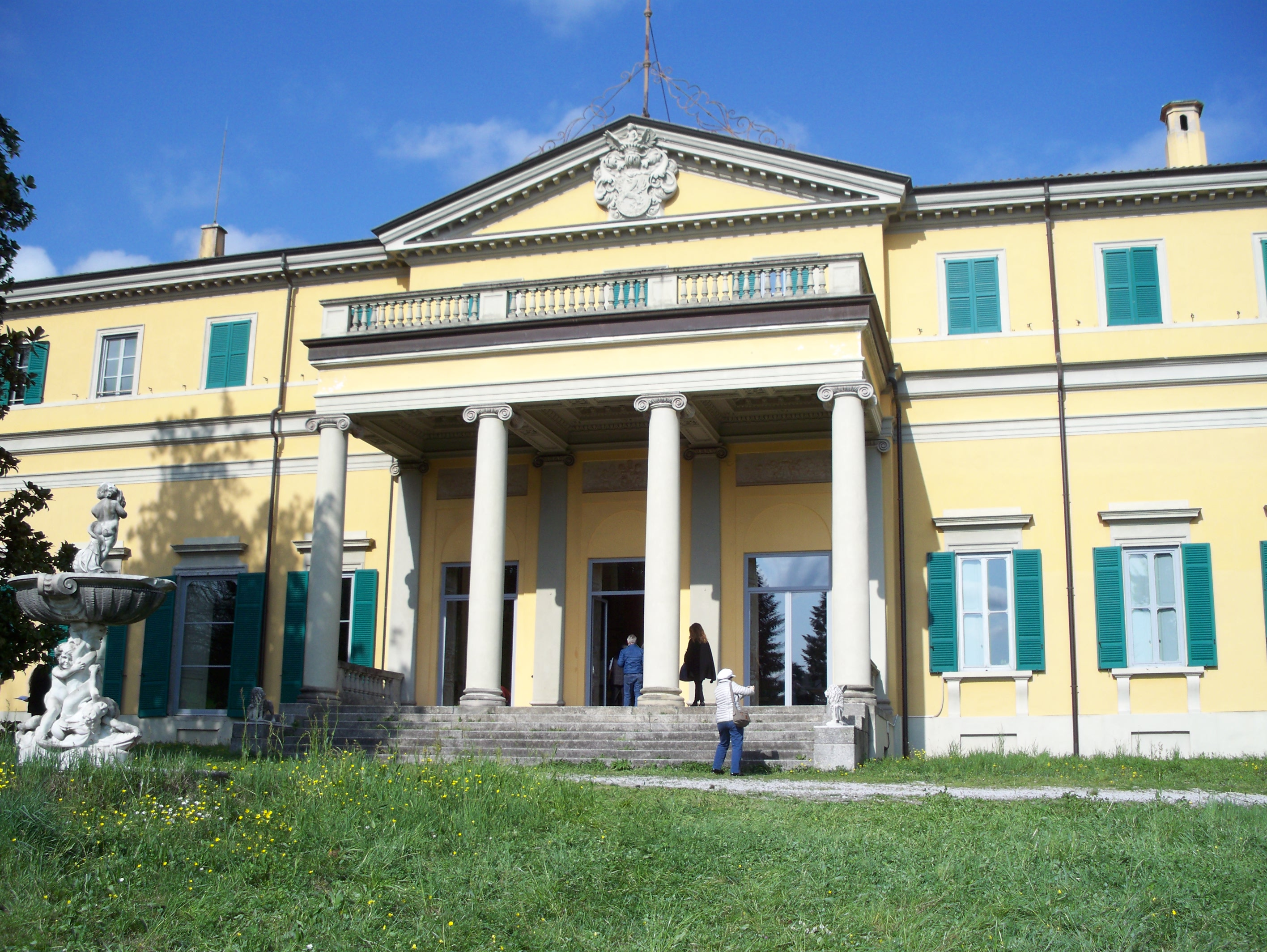
Villa Amalia, Erba

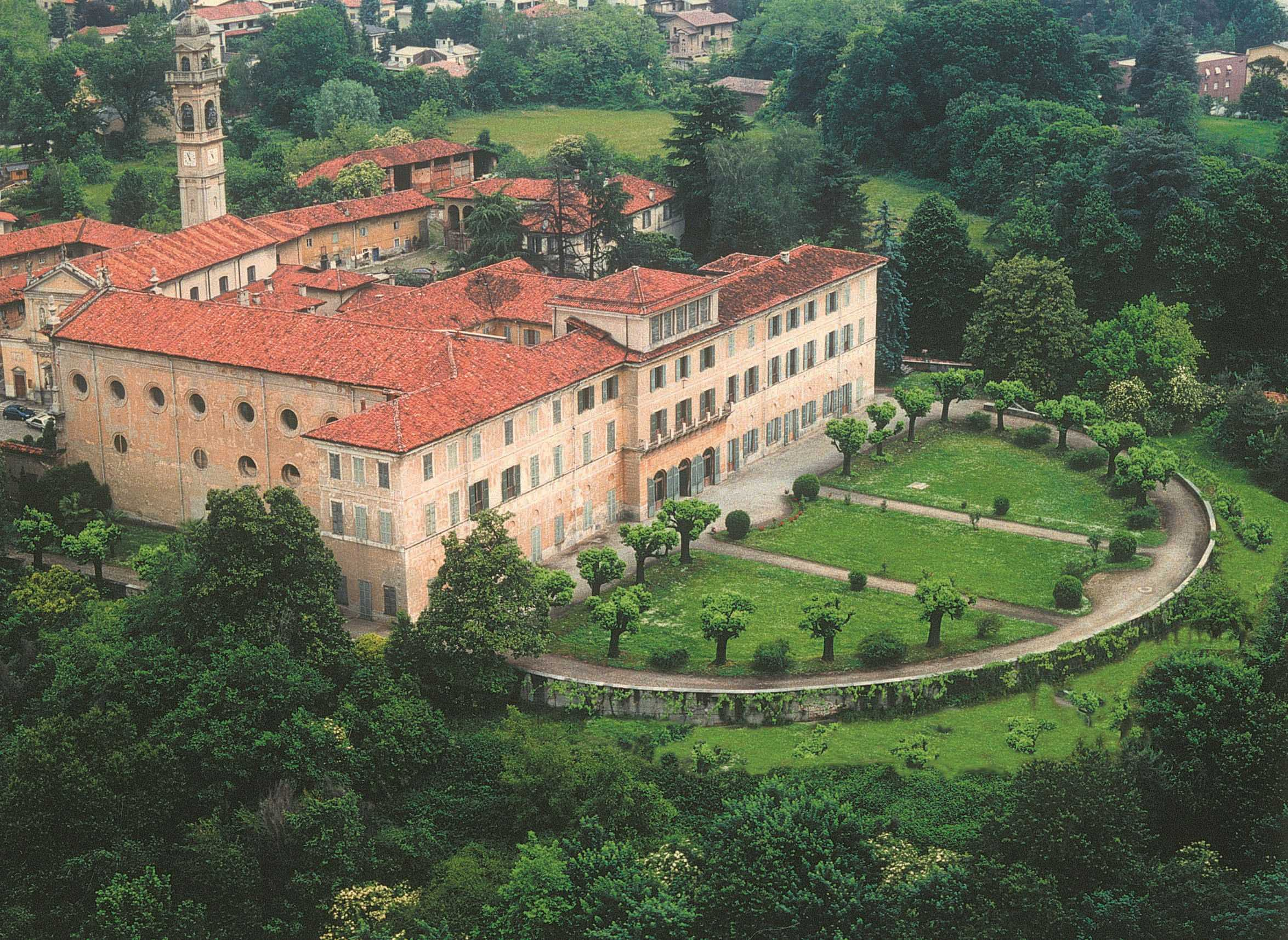
Villa Antona Traversi, Meda

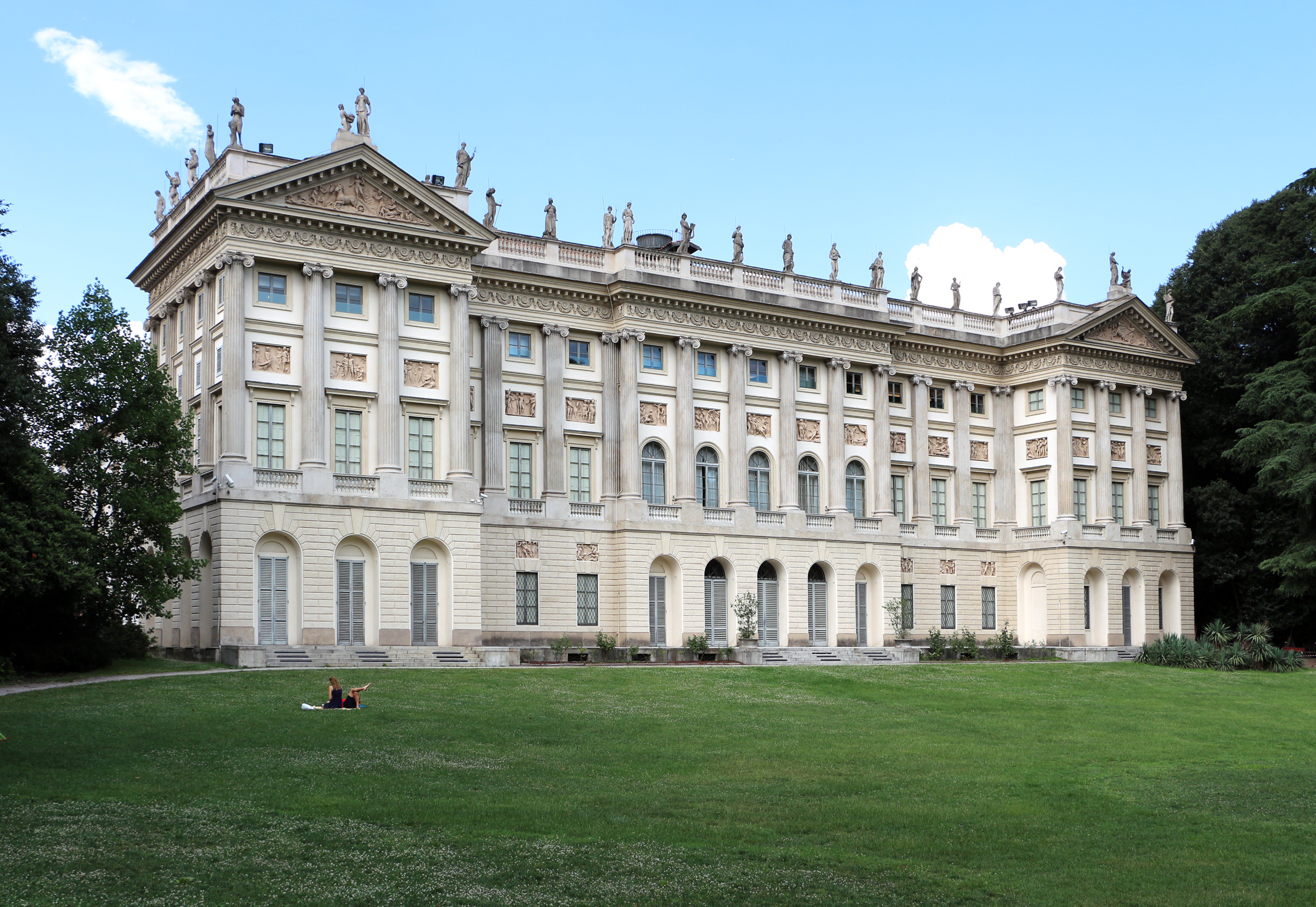
Royal Villa of Milan (1796)

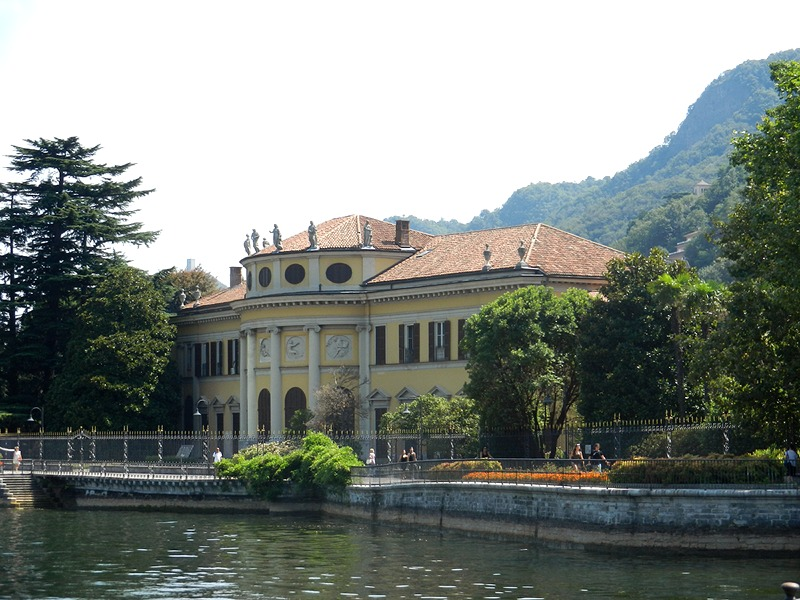
Villa Saporiti, Como

== See also ==
- Neoclassical architecture in Milan

== Bibliography ==
- Pisaroni, Micaela (1999). Il neoclassicismo - Itinerari di Milano e Provincia (in Italian). Como: NodoLibri. pp. 27 et seq. ISBN 978-8871850801.
- Harris, Diane Suzette (2003). The nature of authority: villa culture, landscape, and representation in eighteenth-century Lombardy. Pennsylvania State University Press.
- Middleton, Robin; Watkin, David (1980). Neoclassical and 19th century architecture. New York: Abrams. ISBN 978-0810910140.
