= Porta Garibaldi (Milan city gate) =

Coordinates: 45°28′50.63″N 9°11′12.83″E

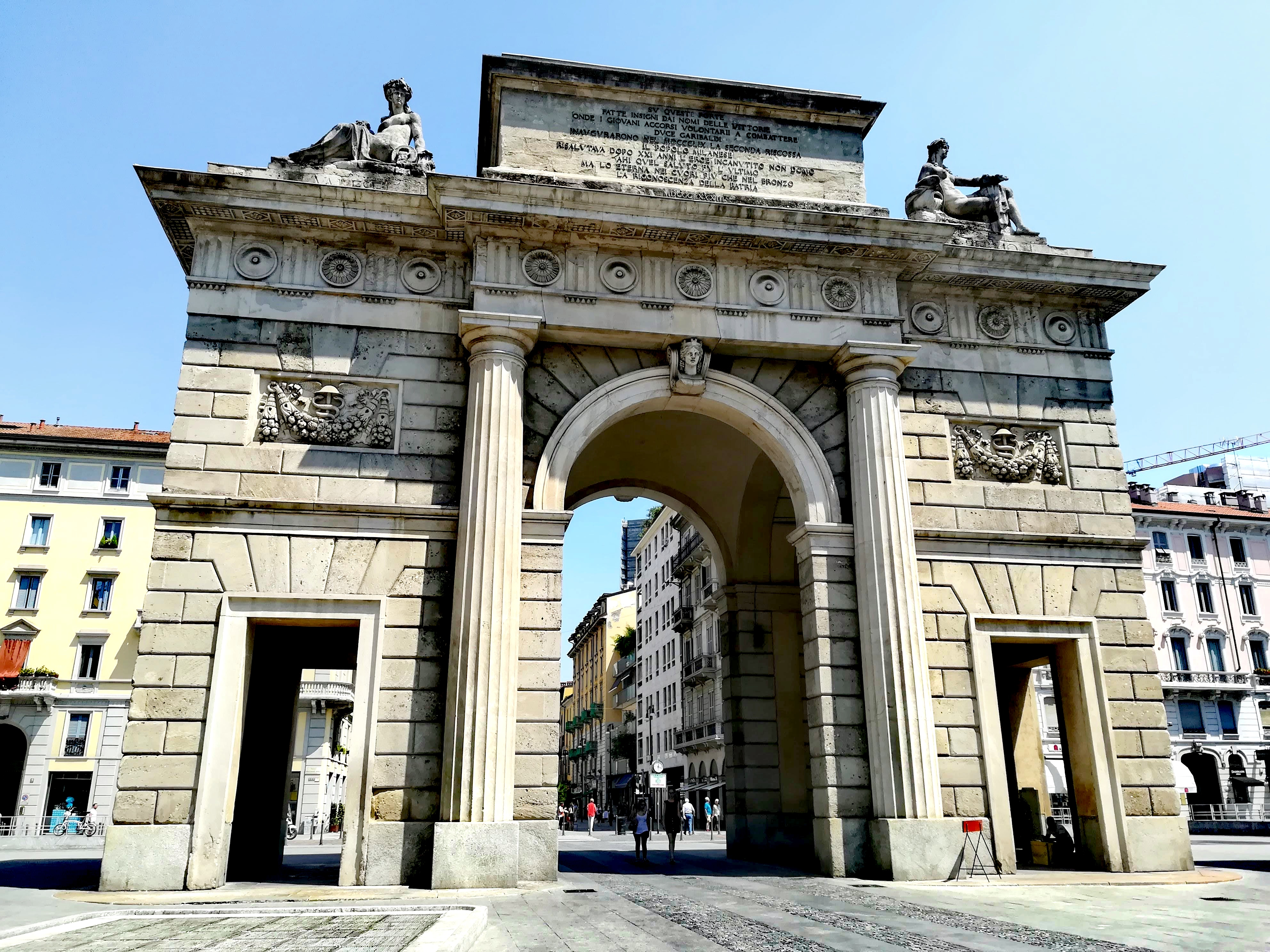
Porta Garibaldi

The Porta Garibaldi, previously known as the Porta Comasina, is a city gate located in Milan, Italy, on the old road to Como. The Neoclassical arch was built to commemorate the visit of Francis I of Austria in 1825. It was reconstructed from 1826 to 1828 by Giacomo Moraglia and dedicated to Garibaldi in 1860. Built in the Doric style, the gate is flanked by two portals overlooking the street. The customs houses were added in 1836. It's less than monumental proportions are better suited to the surrounding streets as the gate used to be at the end of a winding road, hardly compatible with a grandiose project.

Today Porta Garibaldi is also one of the districts of Milan.
