= Palazzo Melzi d'Eril, Milan =

Coordinates: 45.4752°N 9.1946°E

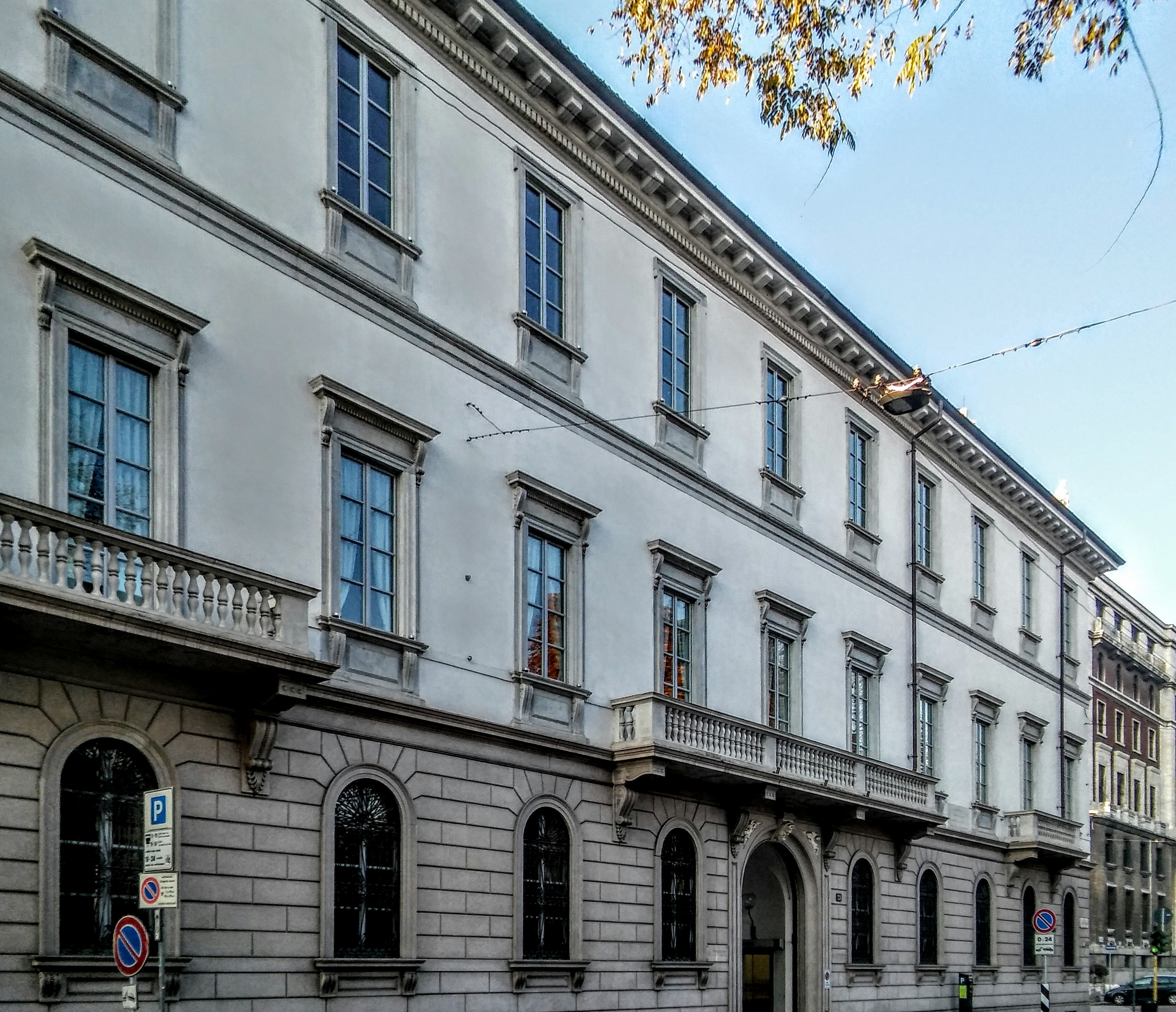
Palazzo Melzi d'Eril, via Manin, Milan

The Palazzo Melzi d'Eril is a neoclassical-style palace located on Via Manin #21-23 in Milan, region of Lombardy, Italy.

== History ==
The palace was designed by Giocondo Albertolli, while Giacomo Moraglia to design the facade. At one time the palace had a large garden attached. The base has pink hewn stone, while the upper floors have a sober repetitive structure with a large balcony over the entrance. . A distinct Palazzo Mezi d'Eril was erected in 1483 in Vaprio d'Adda.
