= Alessandro Annoni =

Italian politician (1770–1825)

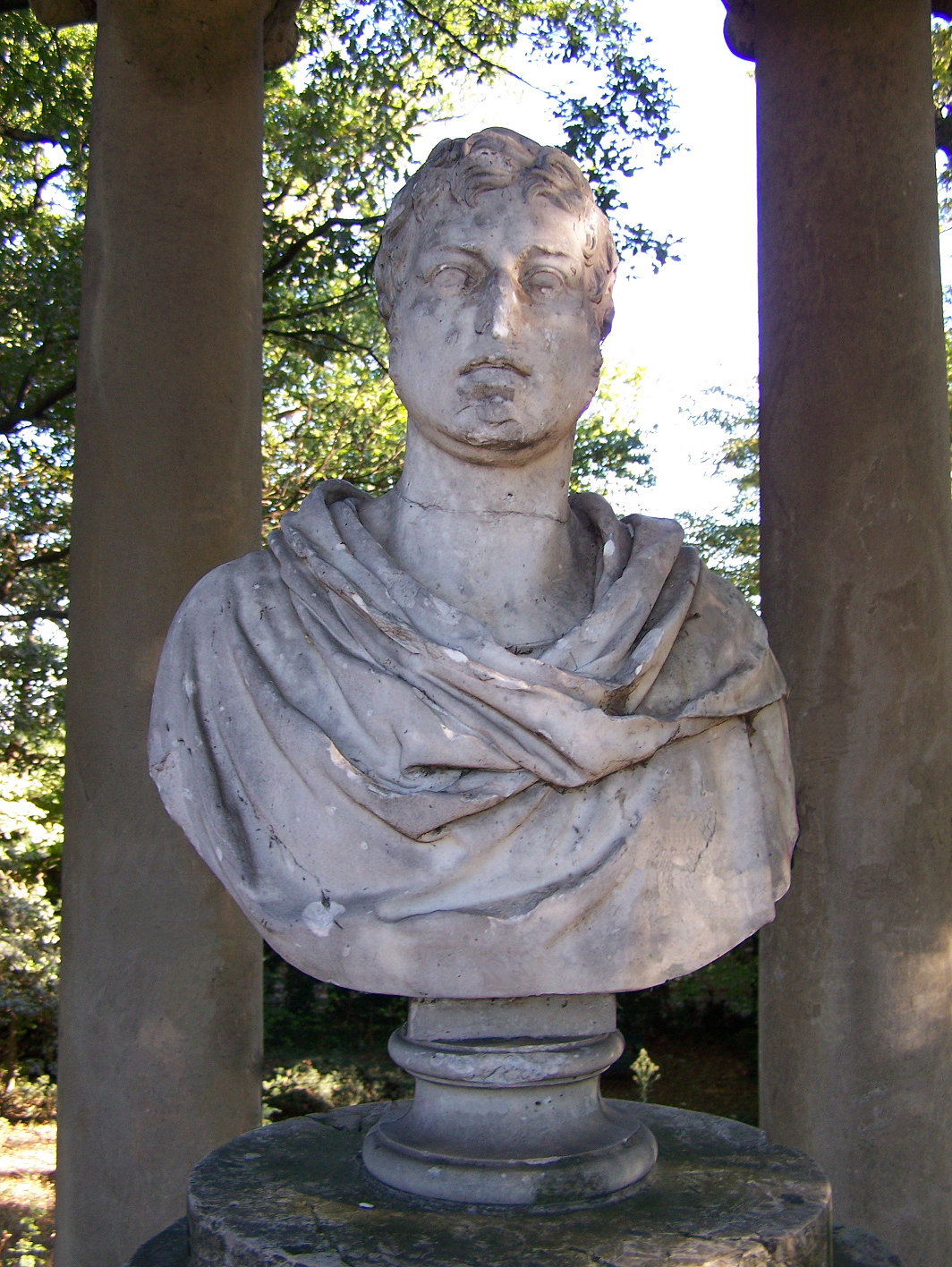
Bust at Villa Annoni in Cuggiono

Carlo Alessandro Annoni, Count V of Cerro Pieve San Giuliano (1770 – 13 September 1825), was an Italian politician.

== Biography ==
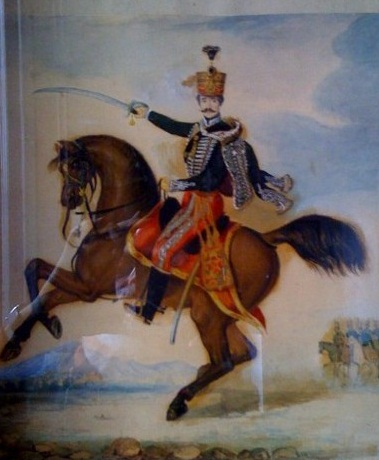
Alessandro Annoni in uniform on an early 19th century ceramic miniature

Belonging to an ancient noble patrician family of Milan, Annoni was the only male son of Count Giovanni Pietro and his wife, the Genoese noblewoman Giulia Pallavicino, of the Marquises of Persia. He was born in the family's Milanese palace, in Corso di Porta Romana. Through his great-grandmother Teopista Mosca, he was related to the famous poet Giacomo Leopardi.

Having obtained the noble titles of his family on his father's death, in 1792 he was appointed Emperor's chamberlain as Duke of Milan. Later he was one of the nobles who entered the administration of the Italian Republic under the aegis of vice-president Francesco Melzi d'Eril at the beginning of the nineteenth century. Rich landowner of the newborn Department of Olona, he became the representative of the landowners at the Consulte de Lyon. In 1804 he started the construction of a majestic monumental residence, in Cuggiono as his country villa, entrusting the project to the famous architect Leopoldo Pollack. In 1809 he was awarded the title of Commander of the Order of the Iron Crown and was chamberlain to the viceroy Eugène de Beauharnais, by whom he was appointed Count of the Kingdom of Italy on 11 October 1810. In 1810 he bought the Chiappana and Chiappanella farmsteads in Abbiategrasso from the Policlinico of Milan. After the fall of the Napoleonic regime, Alessandro always remained faithful to the Bonapartist cause, but to regain full possession of his property and titles he had to renounce the recognition of the title of Napoleonic count and submit to the Austrian restoration.

=== Family ===
Annoni married the Countess Leopoldina Cicogna Mozzoni, later lady of the viceroy Princess Augusta of Bavaria, in Milan on 7 July 1803. This was the daughter of Count Francesco Leopoldo Cicogna Mozzoni and the noblewoman Teresa Marliani. The couple had one son, Francesco (1804 – 1872), who was a general during the Italian unification period.

After Annoni's death, his wife later remarried with Count Friedrich Wilhelm Rembert von Berg, a general in the service of the Russian Empire, from whom she had no children.

=== Death ===
Annoni suffered from erythema, epilepsy, circulation and brain problems for some time and died in Milan on September 13, 1825 at 09:00. The funeral took place in the Basilica of San Nazaro in Brolo in Milan.
