= John F. Annoni =

Educator, gun rights advocate, author, and outdoorsman

John Frank Annoni is an educator, gun rights advocate, author and outdoor mentor and activist. He is known for founding the Camp Compass Academy, a non profit organization and educational system for outdoor activity mainly for youth and the awareness campaigns Hunting Awareness and 2 Million Bullets. In 2008, he was nominated by Outdoor Life as one of the OL25 for "changing the face of hunting and fishing".

== Biography ==
Annoni graduated from Kutztown University in 1989 with a Bachelor's degree in Elementary Education.

=== Camp Compass Academy ===
In 1994, while teaching at Cleveland elementary school, he started Camp Compass Academy, an outdoor activity organization for encouraging urban children to undertake and pursue outdoor activities. Annoni initiated the campaign 2 Million Bullets after the shooting death of one of his students, which promotes hunting and shooting education among the youth.

=== Youth and firearm advocacy ===
Annoni is known for appearing in TV shows, podcast and radio shows as a speaker advocating for firearm education and conservation. He is also known for his efforts towards diversity, equity and inclusion in the outdoor activities. In 2015, as an advocate of gun culture and gun rights, Annoni was in news for the debate with Michael Bloomberg about his statement regarding gun control. He also testified for the SHARE Act in the US House of Representatives "To protect and enhance opportunities for recreational hunting, fishing, and shooting, and for other purposes".

In 2018, Annoni initiated Hunting Awareness, a societal awareness program to amass solidarity amongst sportsmen and women. The program operates with an orange camouflage symbolic 'ribbon wearing' amongst its community members and adherents.

== Books authored ==
- Beyond One Day: A Framework for Developing the Social and Academic Character of America's Youth. United States: John Annoni LLC, 2014. ISBN 978-0-692-30245-3.
- From the Hood to the Woods, United States: John Annoni LLC, ISBN 978-0578010441
