= Paolo Andreani =

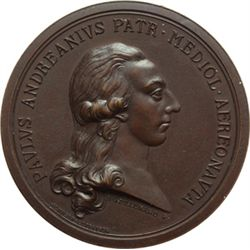
- commemorative medal
- Born: 27 May 1763; Milan, Duchy of Milan
- Died: 11 May 1823 (aged 59); Nice, Kingdom of Sardinia
- Known for: First balloon flight in Italy
- Parent(s): Giovanni Pietro Paolo Andreani and Clementine Sormani

Paolo Andreani (27 May 1763 – 11 May 1823) was an Italian who made the first balloon flight over Italian soil. He also made an exploration around the Great Lakes in North America.

== Life ==
Andreani was born in Milan on 27 May 1763. His father was Giovanni Pietro Paolo Andreani (1705–1772) and his mother, Clementine Sormani (1733–1763). His father's family can be traced back to the aristocracy of the 13th century, and he was made a Count in 1748. Andreani was the last of the children and they were left without a father in 1772, when they were placed in the care of a guardian.

Andreani's wide range of interests started at an early age. At fifteen he was a member of the "Arcadia Literary Academy". His scientific interests prevailed when he began his balloon experiments based on the news of the flight of the Montgolfier Brothers. Andreani set out to repeat the feat in Italy at the Villa Sormani in Moncucco, a village which is now located in the municipality of Brugherio. The Montgolfier brothers' flight took place in France on 21 November 1783.

In 1792, Andreani was elected as a member to the American Philosophical Society in Philadelphia.

== Flight ==
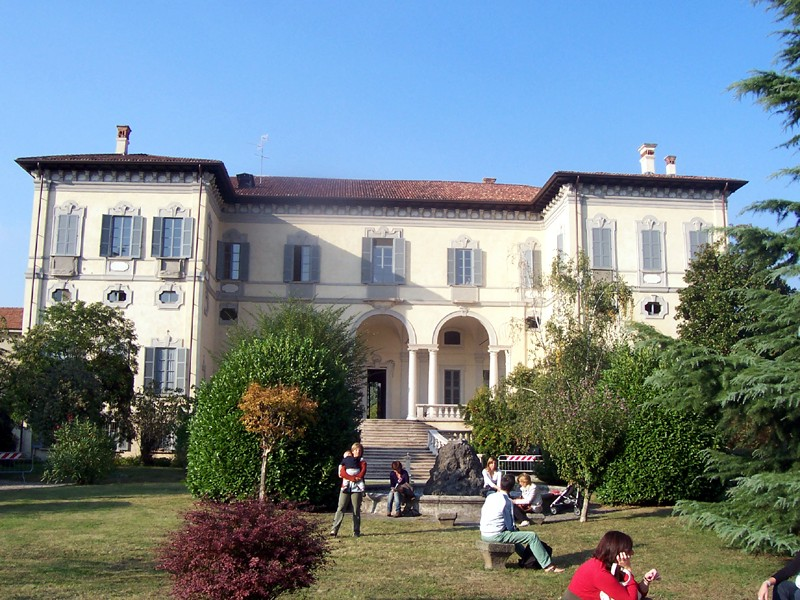
The Villa Sormani today in Brugherio

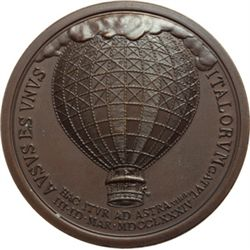
The Emperor's medal showed the balloon on one side

The first unmanned balloon flight seen by Andreani took place in 1784 when a hot air balloon built by the Gerli brothers rose a few metres into the air. The small balloon had been built by the three Gerli brothers, who were skilled builders and engineers. Andreani offered to commission a larger balloon. Thanks to its diameter of 23 metres (75 ft), Andreani made the first balloon flight when he was only 20. The paper-lined cloth balloon had a wickerwork passenger carrier. The hot air was created by burning birch wood, alcohol, and turpentine. The balloon took less than four weeks to make and weighed about 1,300 kilograms (2,900 lb) when it was fuelled and had three passengers aboard. The first flight took place on 25 February 1784 when Andreani, Agostino Gerli and Charles Gerli flew for 25 minutes without incident.

A public demonstration was arranged for 13 March 1784 at the Villa Sormani in Moncucco (now part of the modern city of Brugherio). Joseph II, the Holy Roman Emperor was invited to watch, but he reportedly declined the invitation as he did not want to witness a suicide. Instead, the Emperor encouraged the cancellation of the flight. Despite the Emperor's assessment, a crowd of nobility and intellectuals gathered to witness Andreani and two local farmers ascend to a height of 1,537 metres (5,043 ft) whilst the balloon travelled a distance of 8 kilometres (5.0 mi).

On March 28 Andreani received a standing ovation at La Scala. The Emperor joined in the celebrations by arranging for a medal to be struck to commemorate the event. Andreani appears on one side of the medal, and on the other is his balloon. In September 1784, the first hydrogen balloon ascent in Britain took place and the aeronaut was another Italian, Vincenzo Lunardi.

== Explorer ==
Andreani was now a recognized aeronaut but he also became known as a traveller and explorer. He met the geologist Barthélemy Faujas de Saint-Fond in Paris and rejoined him in England, where Faujas was determined to visit the Scottish island of Staffa to observe the rock structure there. The party consisted of Faujus, Andreani, and the American polymath William Thornton. During the trip, Faujas determined that Fingals Cave had a volcanic origin. During their return through England, they met James Watt, and they also observed Joseph Priestly's experiments which were revealing new gases from water.

Andreani wrote an account of his later journey from Milan to Paris in 1784. In 1790 he set out on a five-year mission to explore lands between the United States and Canada. He went with letters of introduction to George Washington, James Madison, and Thomas Jefferson. His first journal records his meeting with the Iroquois. Using canoes along the Hudson River and the Mohawk River and around the Great Lakes, he and his group travelled over 5,000 kilometres (3,100 mi) and met six different Native American peoples. He documented his contacts with the Oneida and Onondaga peoples in particular. He carried a letter of introduction to the Mohawk leader Joseph Brant, but he was particularly assisted by Samuel Kirkland, a local missionary, as Andreani had a letter of introduction to Kirkland from General Philip Schuyler.

Andreani also wrote about meeting German, Dutch, Shakers, Iroquois, and Anglo New Yorkers. His reports on the Oneida include an illustration which is thought to be the first recorded picture of a lacrosse stick. The notes that he made are extant. They have been translated, annotated, edited, and republished in 1996 and 2006. Andreani was elected to membership in the American Philosophical Society, an eminent scholarly organization of international reputation, on January 20, 1792.

== Back to Europe ==
Andreani returned to Europe between 1810 and 1812 via the Caribbean with the intention of returning to Lombardy. He had hoped to find a cure for the paralysis of his legs, but his plans were thwarted by his debtors and he was suspected by the Austrians of having sympathy for the ideals of the Enlightenment and the United States. He died on May 11, 1823, now totally disabled and in dire circumstances, as an expatriate in Nice (where he had moved in 1817).
