= Moncucco =

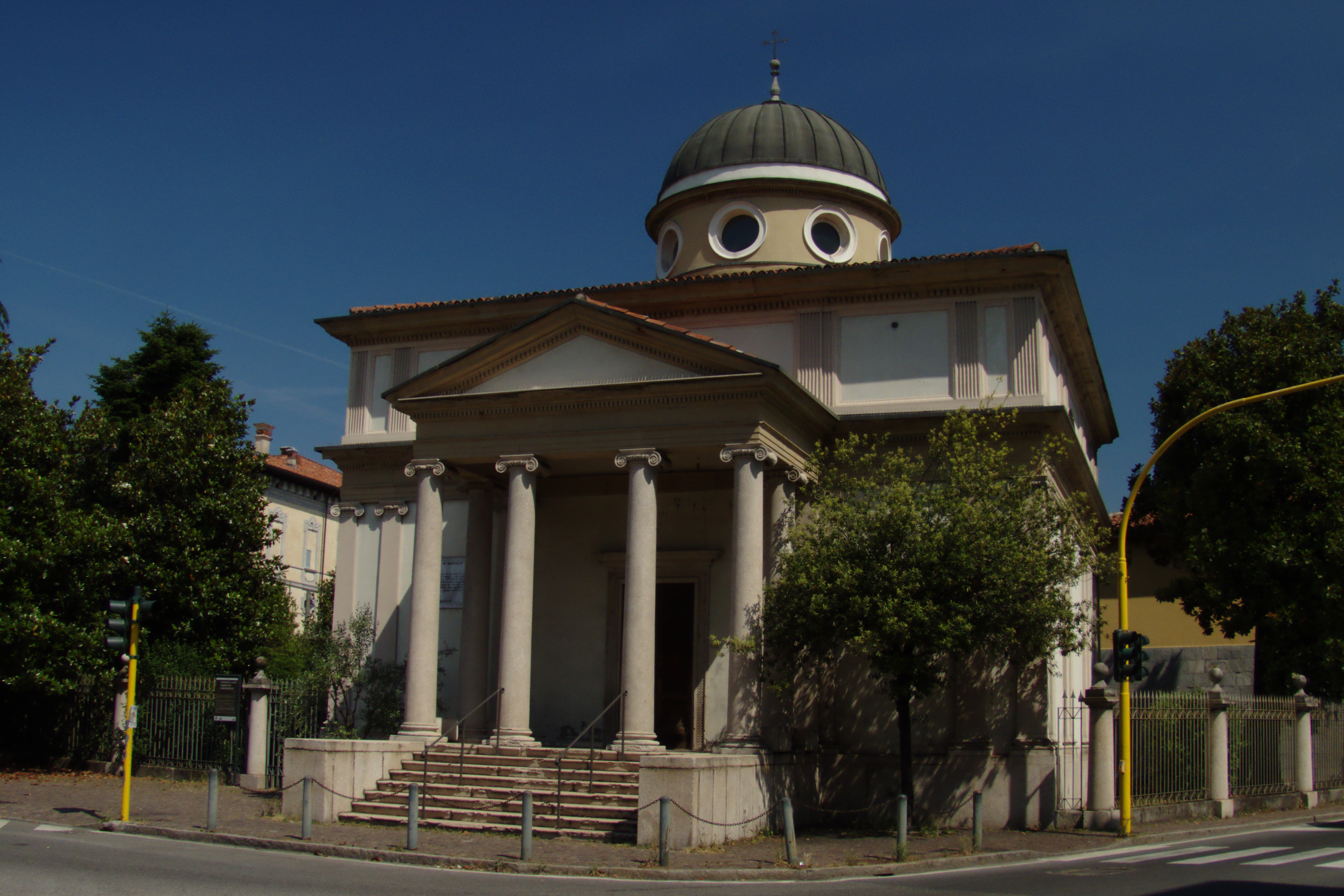
- Saint Lucius Church in Moncucco
- Etymology: Mon cucco or Moncuc
- Interactive map of Moncucco
- Coordinates: 45°32′53.56″N 9°17′32.17″E
- Country: Italy
- Region: Lombardy
- Province: Monza and Brianza
- Comune: Brugherio
- 20861: 039
- Website: Official website

Moncucco was an autonomous Italian municipality until March 30, 1871, when due to a royal decree it became a hamlet of the town of Brugherio, established in 1866. The actual village is located south of Brugherio, along the road that leads from Milan to Vimercate.

== History ==
=== Origins ===
==== Etymology ====
The origin of the name Moncucco is discordant. For some, it is a French loan word mon cucco, meaning "my cuckoo"; others hold, including Cesare Cantù, it is a term derived from the name of various countries and French farmhouses called Moncuc.

==== Ancient period and Middle Ages ====
The oldest evidence of the existence of Moncucco derives from two Roman inscriptions in the town of Malnido, (part of Moncucco between 1769 and 1871). This confirms the Roman origin of the ancient town (as well as Brugherio).

The Moncucco' centre was a small hill, where a castle was built in the Middle Ages, being used as a country residence. In 1000 AD this castle was located near an ancient chariot road located in a reclaimed area. With the imperial crisis following the Investiture Controversy, between the eleventh and twelfth centuries, the young town of Monza Moncucco broke away, together with San Damiano and Cassina Baraggia, which were established as autonomous municipalities by their own right. Monza was the capital of the territory belonging to Martesana, which included the entire territory of Brugherio, following a grant in 1158 by Frederick Barbarossa who encouraged the town's freedom from Milan, the city of the Emperor's enemy. The descriptions about Moncucco thereafter are sporadic: for instance, it is known that in 1339 an exceptional flood of the Lambro river hit some areas of Brugherio including Malnido and Moglia, coming up to Moncucco.

===== Coat of arms =====
At number 107 of street Viale Lombardia in Moncucco, where the seat of the town hall is located, the coat of arms of the hamlet can still be appreciated, made of carved stone and placed where the front door of the building once stood. It depicts a rampant bull in its upper left, a symbol of the "indomitable peasants' souls" and the work of local livestock; and an open door in the form of an arc, symbol of the "generosity of the nobles" in its upper right. At the center of the escutcheon, a white field is depicted, representing the heath.

=== Between sixteenth and eighteenth century ===
From census data dating from 1530, Moncucco possessed an important communal oven. It had a surface of 1.574 poles, and was inhabited by ten people (three families), whose leaders were stewards or farmers. They in turn were responsible for the manse, land owned by a gentleman that allowed them to use it in exchange for part of the harvest or of particular services. In Moncucco, large and medium-sized property prevailed, showing a great deal of agricultural and little manufacturing activity: most of the cultivated areas were used as vineyards, and the number of labourers destined to that activity increased between 1530 and 1546. The 1546 census shows the large amount of fodder possessed by families in Moncucco, considered an index of relative comfort. From 1530 to 1546, population growth remained stable throughout the territory of Brugherio, while during 1541 to 1546 there was a marked decline, with a concentration of fuochi in Moncucco, perhaps due to a tax increase, since fuochi was the basis of the taxation system. In 1559, following the Treaty of Cateau-Cambresis, the State of Milan finally passed to the Habsburgs of Spain who already had ruled indirectly for almost thirty years. Moncucco was part of the Court of Monza, which, although geographically situated in the Peasantry of Martesana, in 1559 came under the jurisdiction of the magistrate of Milan for matters of civil and criminal problems, for public order and for the distribution of fodder.

There is evidence for the existence of consuls in Brugherio dating back to 1578. They are likely to have existed even for the bigger town of Moncucco. That same year Saint Charles Borromeo, archbishop of Milan, began a decentralization plan for the powers of the archpriest of Monza, establishing new parishes: the only parish present in the cities and countryside surrounding Monza was at the time the parish of Saint John, which officiated the sacrament of baptism. The first church that the archbishop turned into a parish was the one of Saint Bartholomew on June 15, 1578, when he was in Brugherio after visiting Monza. In the report of a visit of Cardinal Federico Borromeo found at the latter church, the parish of Saint Bartholomew also incorporated Moncucco, which at that time counted fifty inhabitants. The population, which in the second half of the sixteenth century had grown despite the plague of 1576–77, saw a remarkable arrest due to the return of the plague during the first half of the seventeenth century. In 1648, the manor of Monza was sold by Antonio and Girolamo de Leyva to Giambattista Durini and his brothers. The Durini kept the feud of Monza until 1781, when they gave up ownership because it was too expensive to maintain.

The crisis caused by the Thirty Years' War, the plague, the invasion and high taxes, aggravated the living conditions of the populations of Moncucco and the Brugherio area, causing the further fractioning of its properties. This is evidenced by the survey ordered for the new Land Registry by Charles VI of Austria, who since 1721 had controlled Spanish territories in Italy. A map drawn in 1721 by the Carolino Land Registry shows the size of Moncucco including Bettolino Freddo, Cassina Pobbia, Dorderio, Cassina Guzzina, San Cristoforo and Moglia, and all the crops present therein. Maria Theresa, daughter of Charles VI, established a new council of the Census not only to complete her father's previous one, but also to better implement taxes and administrative reforms, leading to the formation of the decision-making body of Moncucco, Convocato degli estimati. This consisted of landowners, three of which held the power of decision. Before 1755, the year of reform, the General Assembly was also made up of householders, not only landowners.

In 1769 the Government established the aggregation of many small towns under Moncucco for the Census, even if against the advice of people such as San Cristoforo, Moglia, Dorderio, Guzzina, Pobbia, Malnido and Bettolino Freddo. In the middle of the eighteenth century the population of all these small towns was 236 people, 117 of which resided in Moncucco. The small number was due to the area's agricultural character: agriculture in fact always remained the main activity of Moncucco, which had neither business nor merchants mills. The old law of 1470, set by Galeazzo Sforza, established a maximum number of mulberry trees for every one hundred perches: sericulture and silk production were still flourishing during the Austrian government.

==== Trivia ====
From Villa Sormani's park in Moncucco on 13 March 1784, Count Paolo Andreani made a famous ascension with a balloon, the first instance of human flight in Italy.

=== The nineteenth century ===
During its French domination (1796–1814), the division of the territory was organised into departments, districts and cantons, with Monza being included in the Department of Olona. On January 13, 1812, Moncucco was incorporated into Monza together with Brugherio and San Damiano. With the Restoration, the territory was reorganized into provinces and districts: Monza became part of the Province of Milan. In the nineteenth century Moncucco remained a predominantly agricultural town. Between 1751 and 1856 the cultivation of mulberry spread considerably. The spinning mill of Moncucco was located on the left side of Villa Sormani. Between 1855 and 1873 municipalities were again recorder while new maps were procured: the census was conducted between the end of Austrian domination and the formation of Italy as a unified state. Lombardy, in 1859, with the armistice of Villafranca, was ceded by Austria to the Kingdom of Sardinia, after the War of Independence.

==== From municipality to hamlet ====
The decision for the unification of Brugherio's territory was based on administrative and financial reasons, such as tax differences and territorial fragmentation. Moncucco, which was split in 1856, was described by the Buildings Census as "divided in small groups of farms...without a real country". Initially with the Royal Decree signed by Vittorio Emanuele II on December 8, 1866, the Municipality of Brugherio and States was constituted, including part of the territory belonging to Monza, the whole center, Baraggia and Sant'Ambrogio.

Subsequently, the Edict of March 30, 1871 of the Census Board, established the incorporation of Moncucco (excluding Malnido) and San Damiano, which had remained autonomous until then. On March 30 that same year, with Decree number 84912, Sant'Alessandro was removed from the town and joined with Moncucco, together with Occhiate's territory; Malnido Bettolino Freddo went under the municipality of Cologno Monzese.

=== The twentieth century: industrialization ===
Throughout the late nineteenth century and the first decades of the twentieth century, Brugherio (and with it the hamlet of Moncucco) remained tied to agriculture, while in Milan industrialization rapidly progressed. Initially landowners who administered the City forbade their employees to work in the nascent factories of Milan, Monza and Sesto San Giovanni; but after 1909, in part due to socialist-fomented strikes, the family decided some employees could be sent to the factories, removing them from the fields. With the First World War, spinning mills increased in number, which at the end of the war were transformed into woolen mills. In the twenties, Ermenegildo Magnaghi worked creating devices with aviation applications. During the war he presented 44 patents, for which he received an honorary degree from Politecnico di Milano. His company, Magnaghi Ermenegildo & C. in Milan, employed 2000 workers.

When they began the bombing of Milan, between 1942 and 1943, the company's main factory was moved to Brugherio, after the purchase of Villa Sormani by the Stanzani lords. With the advent of CNC machines in the mid-sixties, Magnaghi Brugherio went into crisis, while in Milan the industry began to flourish. In 1985, Brugherio produced only device components. Magnaghi Milan currently exports its products all over the world and is the first Italian manufacturer of hydraulic systems.

== Historical places ==
=== Villa Sormani ===
Built in the eighteenth century in an ancient castle, it is an example of a "villa of delights", a type of country residence which proved popular to the north-east of Milan in the first decades of the eighteenth century. It is an example of Lombard Baroque. It belonged to the Marquis Silva, passed in 1733 to the Spanish nobleman Don Carlo Bolagnos, who in 1779 took over Andreani. In 1817 the villa became the property of the Sormani family; in 1913 of the Verri and finally the Stanzani family, which in the eighties sold the villa to private owners.

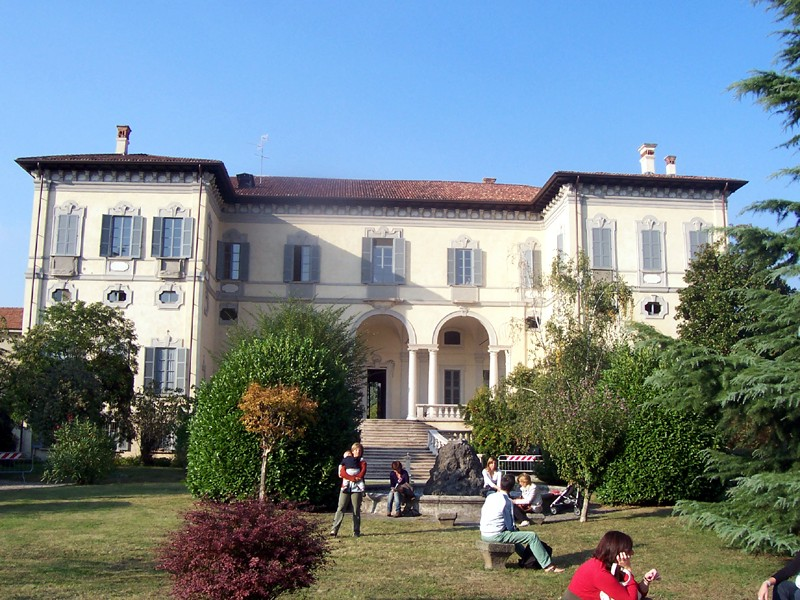
Villa Sormani-Andreani

=== Saint Lucius Church ===
The church was founded in the sixteenth century as a chapel dedicated to Saint Anthony of Padua, attached to the convent of Saint Francis in Lugano. At the beginning of the nineteenth century, when under Napoleon religious institutions struck, the fathers of the convent inserted their headquarters in the list of buildings to suppress. In fact, in 1815, the complex was put up for auction. The architect and teacher at the Brera Academy, Giocondo Albertolli, brother of the purchaser of the land, Albertolli Christmas, wanted to save at least the church of Saint Anthony, which he attributed to Bramante. Thanks to Count Gianmario Andreani who bought the church, it was possible to completely disassemble the building, and move parts from Lugano to the park of Villa Sormani-Andreani, where it was rebuilt (in 1832) and where it received a new dedication to Saint Lucius, in memory of an ancient pre-existing oratory dedicated to the saint.

== Bibliography ==
- Tribuzio Zotti, Luciana (1986). Brugherio nei documenti (in Italian). Brugherio: Musicografica Lombarda.
- Mancini, Manuela (1996). Brugherio: presente e passato (in Italian). Milano: Swan.
- Brugherio: 2000 anni di storia (in Italian). Brugherio. 1966.
- Brugherio: i suoi luoghi, la sua storia (in Italian). Brugherio: Litostampa. 2009.
