= Giocondo Albertolli =

Swiss-born architect, painter, and sculptor (1743–1839)

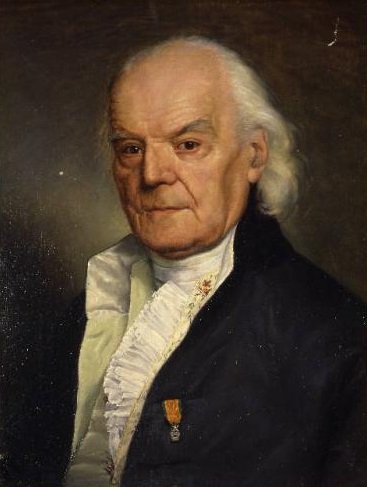
- Giocondo Albertolli; portrait by Carlo Gerosa (1837)
- Born: 24 July 1742; Bedano, Ticino, Switzerland
- Died: 15 November 1839 (aged 96); Milan, Italy
- Known for: Architecture, painting, sculpture
- Movement: Neoclassicism
- Awards: Knight of the Iron Crown (1809)

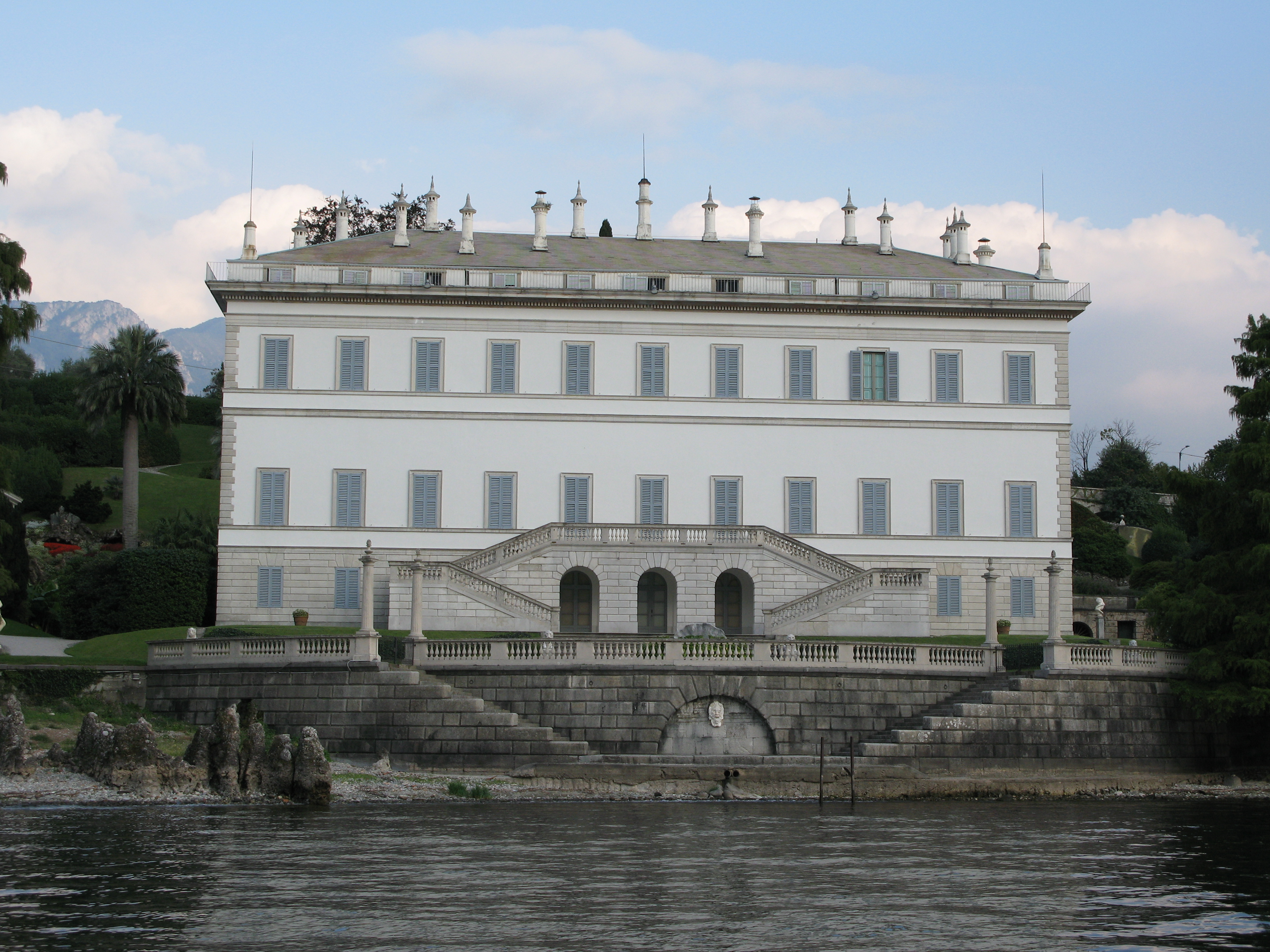
The Villa Melzi on Lake Como

Giocondo Albertolli (24 July 1742 – 15 November 1839) was a Swiss-born architect, painter, and sculptor who was active in Italy during the Neoclassical period.

== Biography ==
Albertolli was born into a family of artists in Bedano, a village 7 km north of the (at the time) landvogtei capital Lugano in what today is Ticino. He studied sculpture in Parma, and became known for his ornamental architectural decorations. In 1770, he travelled to Tuscany to work with his brother Grato on the stucco decoration of the Villa del Poggio Imperiale. He then visited Rome and Naples, where he briefly worked with Carlo Vanvitelli. In 1774, he returned to his family in Bedano; soon he met up with Giuseppe Piermarini for whom he collaborated in future stucco decoration of palaces in Milan. From 1775–1779, Piermarini built the Royal Villa of Monza, where Albertolli provided the stucco decoration. Albertolli also worked in the Palazzo Melzi d'Eril in Milan and designed (1808–1815) the famed lakeside Villa Melzi d'Eril in Bellagio. He also rebuilt a Bramantesque chapel in Moncucco, called Shrine of Saint Lucius.

It is acknowledged by many historians that Albertolli contributed to give a new impetus to the art of ornamental design in Italy. He worked on the design of altars, candlesticks, chalices, and lamps for churches. Conversely, he didn't produce many paintings. A Madonna and Child by him is visible in the Milanese church of San Rocco.

In 1776 Albertolli was nominated Professor of ornamenti architettonici (architectural ornament) at the newly created Brera Academy in Milan; he held this post for more than a quarter of a century until failing eyesight caused him to resign in 1812.

In 1809 Napoleon made him a Knight of the Iron Crown.

Albertolli published a number of essays on his art, including:

- Ornamenti Diversi (1782)
- Alcune Decorazioni di Nobili Sale (1787)
- Miscellanea per i giovanni studioso del disegno (1796)
- Corso elementare di ornamenti architettonici (1805)

Albertolli died in Milan in 1839 at the age of ninety-six. His son, Raffaello was an engraver. Giocondo's nephew, Giacomo Albertolli, was a professor of civil architecture in Padua and later in Milan, where he replaced his former teacher, Piermarini.
