= Giacomo Albertolli =

Architect (1761–1805)

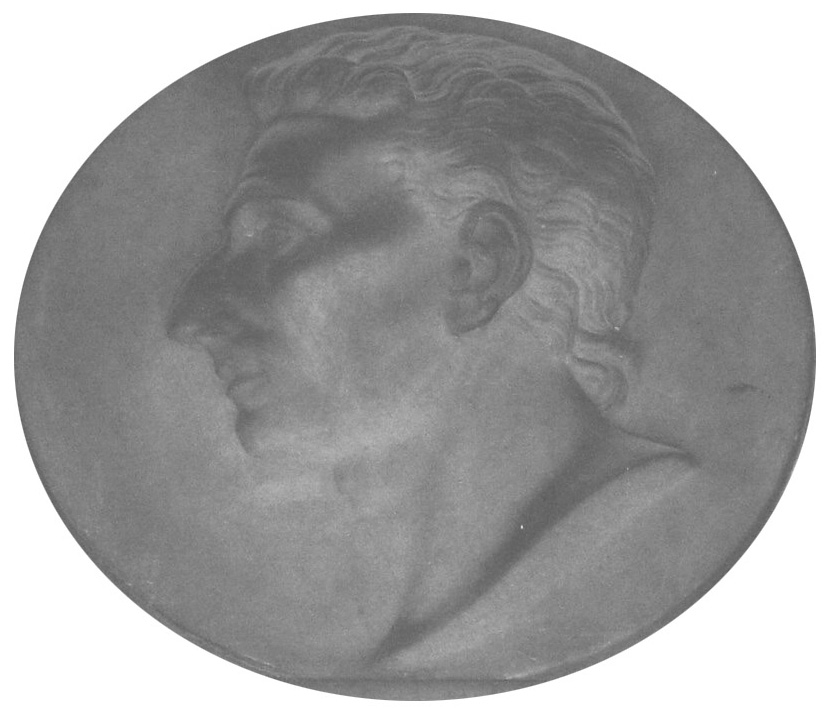
- Born: 1761; Bedano, Ticino, Switzerland
- Died: June 6, 1805 (aged 43–44); Milan, Italy
- Occupation: Architect
- Known for: Neoclassical architecture
- Relatives: Giocondo Albertolli (uncle)

Giacomo Albertolli (1761 – 6 June 1805) was a Swiss-born architect who was active in Italy during the Neoclassical period.

== Biography ==
He was born in Bedano in the province of Ticino. He was the nephew of Giocondo Albertolli, a professor of architecture at the Brera Academy. He studied at the Brera Academy and finished his training at the Accademia di Belle Arti in Parma, under Ennemond Alexandre Petitot.

In 1799 he was suspended from his post on the return of the Austrians and was reappointed on the return of the French. In his teaching, he introduced the study of Greek antiquities, as illustrated in the publications of Julien-David Le Roy, James "Athenian" Stuart and Nicholas Revett. From 1803, together with his uncle Giocondo, Giacomo was part of various commissions set up to control the city’s building trade. He died of apoplexy (stroke) on 6 June 1805.
