= Giuseppe Zanoia =

Italian architect

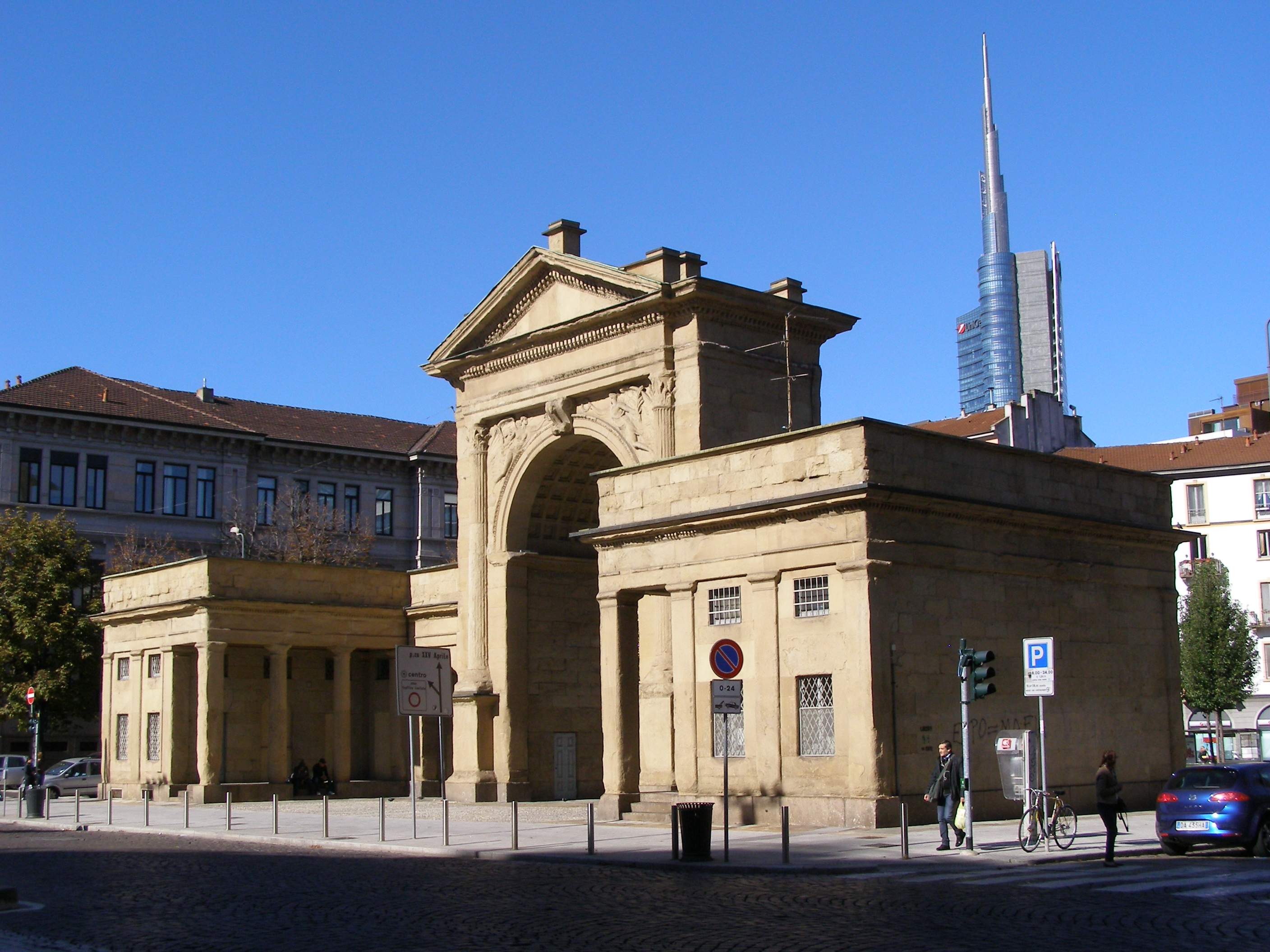
Milan's Porta Nuova

Giuseppe Zanoia (1752–1817) was an Italian Neoclassical architect who is remembered for his Porta Nuova in Milan. He also collaborated on the Neogothic design of Milan's Duomo.

== Biography ==
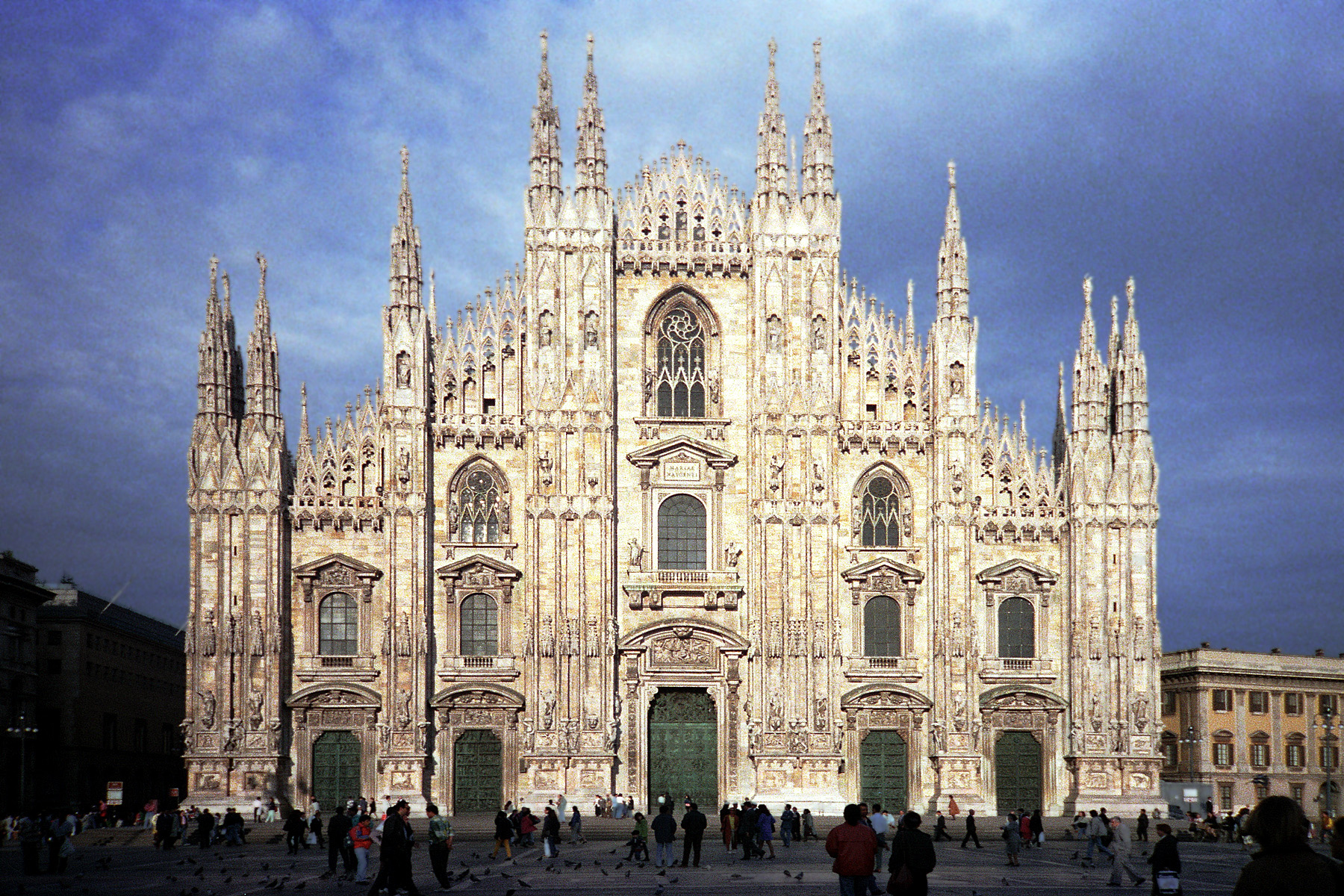
Duomo di Milano, Milan Cathedral

A canon at Milan's Basilica of Sant'Ambrogio, he also taught at the Brera Academy, taking the position of Giacomo Albertolli. He was a friend of the Enlightenment poet Giuseppe Parini. From 1807, he was a member of the Ornato Commission appointed under Napoleon to redesign Milan.

In architecture, he mainly adopted the Neoclassical style as can be seen from his design for Milan's Porta Nuova, inspired by Rome's Arch of Titus and completed in 1813. However, when working on the design of Milan Cathedral's facade in 1805 under direct orders from Napoleon, his approach was Neogothic. The work was in fact completed by Carlo Amati in 1813.

Other works included the Santa Savina altar in Sant'Ambrogio (1798), extension of the Palazzo della Canonica (1802). He restored the church of S. Ambrogio in Stresa (1790) and was at work at the nearby Palazzo Borromeo (Isola Bella) (1795).

== See also ==
- Neoclassical architecture in Milan
