= Pioltello train derailment =

2018 train accident in Italy

Pioltello Train Derailment
- Location within Italy

Details
- Date: 25 January 2018; 06:55–06:57 local time (05:55–05:57 UTC)
- Location: Pioltello, Italy
- Coordinates: 45.4829°N 9.3124°E
- Line: Cremona – Milan
- Operator: Trenord
- Incident type: Derailment
- Cause: Broken rail

Statistics
- Trains: 1
- Deaths: 3
- Injured: 46, 5 Critical

Location of the Pioltello train derailment

On 25 January 2018, a commuter train operated by Trenord derailed in Pioltello when two of its carriages came off the track en route to Milan. The incident left three women dead and more than 100 people injured, of whom 46 needed medical assistance in hospital. Five of them were in critical condition.

== Accident ==
Location of cars after the derailment

At about 7:00 local time, a passenger train was travelling from Cremona to Milano Porta Garibaldi when two of the carriages derailed and came to a rest at an angle. The accident occurred between the Pioltello-Limito station and the Segrate station.

Train operator Trenord said that the train was travelling at normal speed when the derailment occurred. Witnesses said that the train experienced vibrations for a few minutes before the accident.

== Investigation ==
Italian police began an investigation into the accident and said that a problem with a track switch could have caused the derailment. A broken rail on a section of jointed track 2.3 kilometres (1.4 mi) from the crash site was later identified as the cause of the derailment. That section of track was scheduled for replacement.

== See also ==
- Hither Green rail crash, another derailment caused by a broken rail at a track joint.
