= Hither Green =

Coordinates: 51.4522°N 0.0000°E

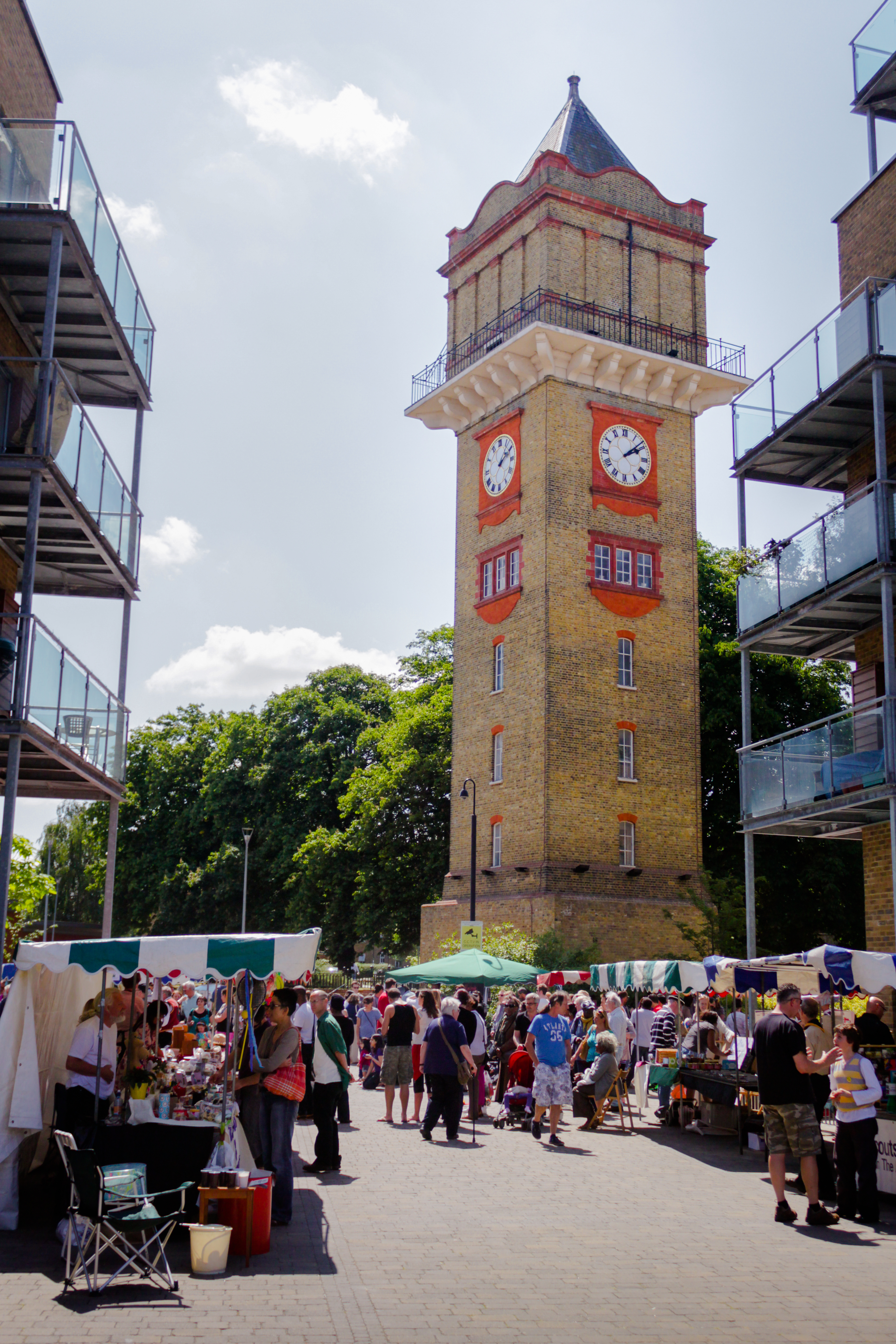
- Square around the water tower belonging to the former Park Fever Hospital

- Location within Greater London
- OS grid reference: TQ395745
- London borough: Lewisham
- Ceremonial county: Greater London
- Region: London
- Country: England
- Sovereign state: United Kingdom
- Post town: LONDON
- Postcode district: SE6, SE12, SE13
- Dialling code: 020
- Police: Metropolitan
- Fire: London
- Ambulance: London
- UK Parliament: Lewisham East
- London Assembly: Greenwich and Lewisham

Hither Green is a district in south-east London, England, in the London Borough of Lewisham. It forms the southern part of Lewisham, 6.6 miles (10.6 km) south-east of Charing Cross, and on the Prime Meridian.

Growing extensively with the arrival of the railways, Hither Green is characterised by late 19th and early 20th century Victorian and Edwardian domestic architecture, most notably the Corbett Estate. The railway runs through the centre of the area, which divides Hither Green into an "east side" focused on Staplehurst Road, and a "west side" focused on Hither Green Lane and Springbank Road. The lane dates back to Roman times and runs between the Quaggy and Ravensbourne rivers.

From 1978 to 1998 Hither Green was the name of the electoral ward that covered the area – then since 2002 the local ward that covered most of Hither Green was Lewisham Central. In 2020 a new Hither Green ward was created. The parliamentary constituency is Lewisham East.

The area is known for the 1967 Hither Green rail crash, in which 49 people were killed.

== History ==
=== Toponymy ===
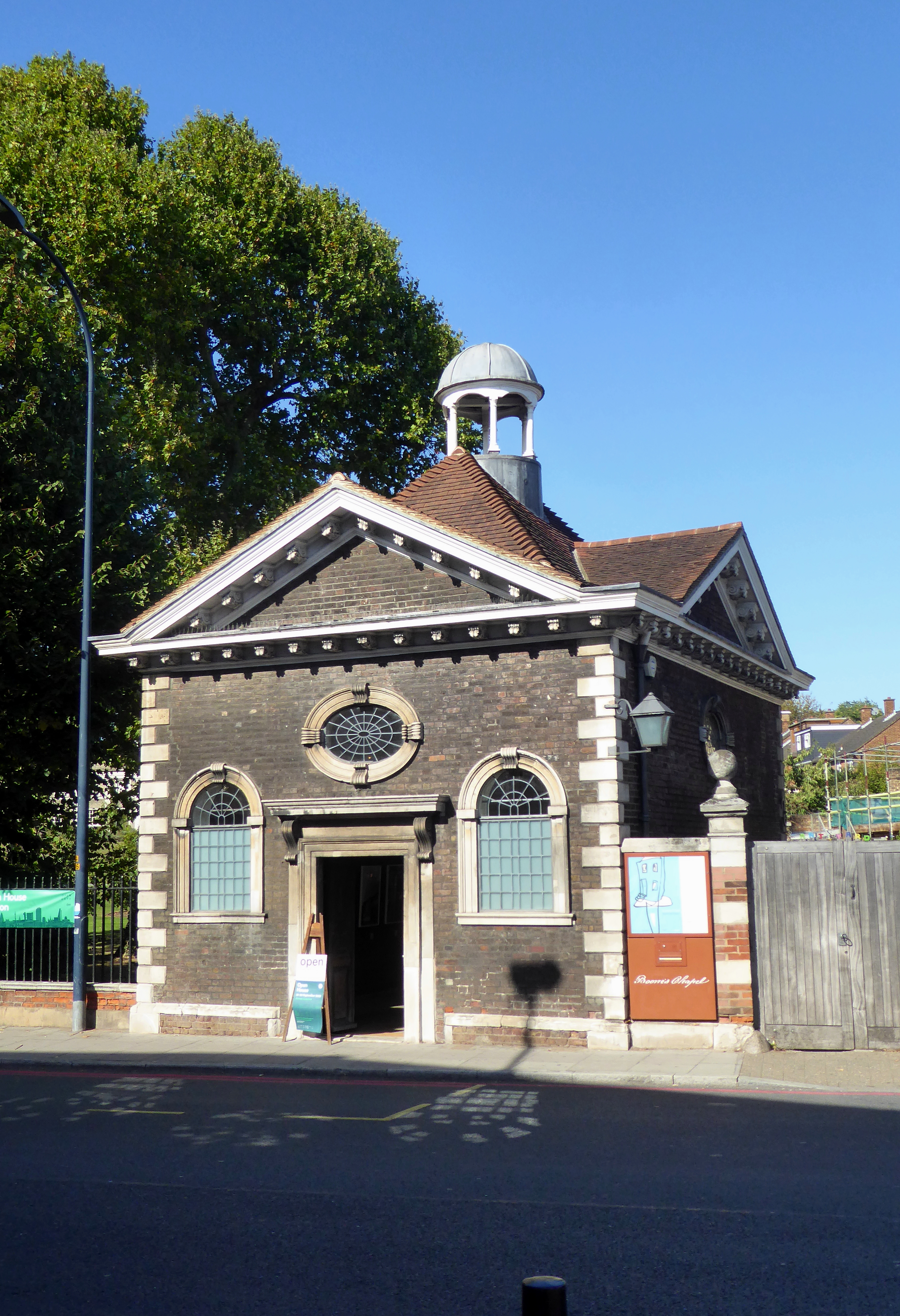
The 17th-century Boone's Chapel in Hither Green

Hither Green acquired its name as it was closer to Lewisham than Further Green located on Verdant Lane. The original Hither Green was located where the present day George Lane intersects with Hither Green Lane. The area now occupied by Hither Green is thought to have originally been a hamlet called Romborough, which was wiped out in the Black Death.

=== Origins ===
Hither Green had remained a largely wooded area through the medieval times but by the 18th century most of the trees had been felled, and the first houses were built. Additional houses appeared through the 19th century, many of them quite substantial residences.

=== Development ===
==== Mountsfield Park ====
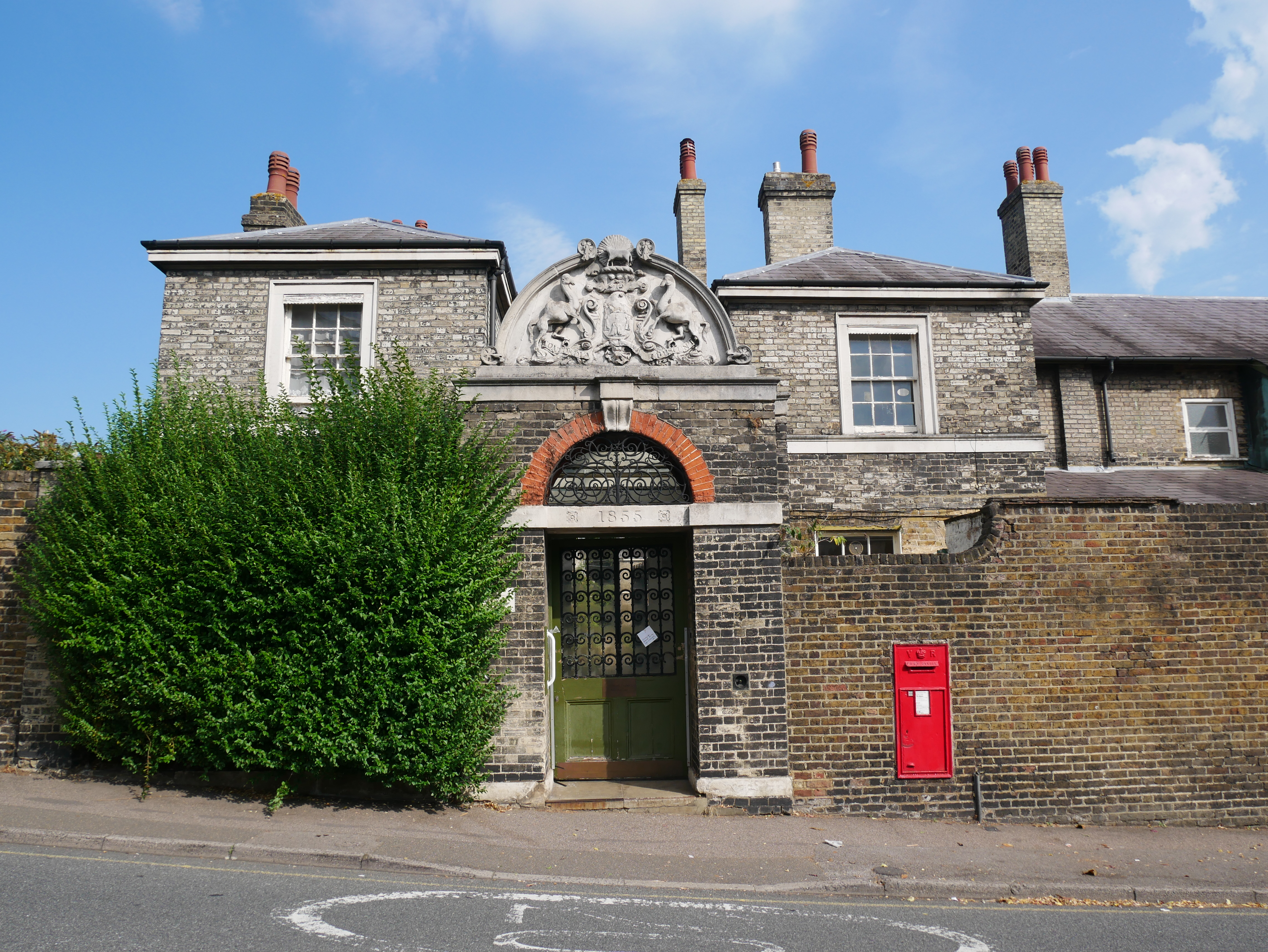
The 19th-century gate and walls around the Merchant Taylor's Almshouses, now Grade II listed

Mountsfield Park opened in August 1905 and has grown through several acquisitions since then. The location of the original park included the substantial residence called Mountsfield, home of noted entomologist Henry Tibbats Stainton. The house was demolished but remnants of the garden remain.

Additional acres were bought from the School Board for London and six allotments from Trinity College. And when Charlton Athletic football club gave up the football ground at the bottom of the hill in 1923 the park had grown to 28 acres.

Bombing damage to a terrace of houses along the south side of George Lane saw this also added to the park. The final addition came in 1994 when a large majority of the Catford Boys School playing field was added.

Other nearby parks include Manor House Gardens and Manor Park to the east.

==== Park Fever Hospital ====
The Park Fever Hospital (latterly Hither Green Hospital) was opened by the Prince of Wales in 1897 for the treatment of infectious diseases such as scarlet fever or diphtheria. The hospital was designed by Edwin T. Hall, the architect behind London's Liberty & Co. department store. The hospital and local area suffered extensive bombing damage during the Second World War. All that remains of the hospital is the water tower with its large clock faces (now the emblem of Hither Green) which is illuminated at night, and several of the hospital's outbuildings. In 1997 the hospital closed and site was developed as a housing estate called Meridian South.

==== Corbett Estate ====
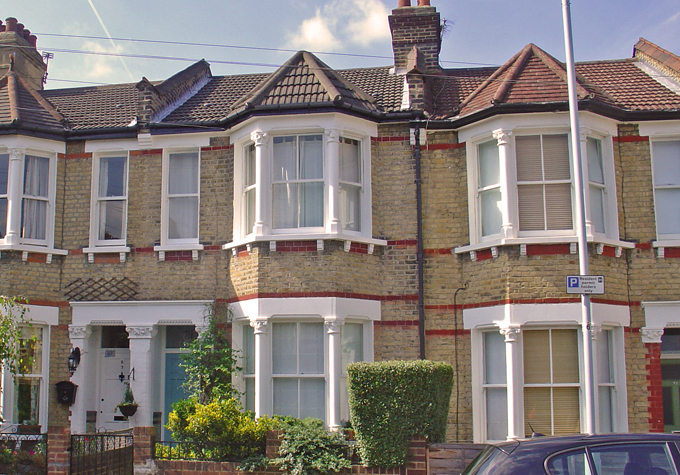
Typical Victorian terrace found on Corbett estate

Much of the Victorian terraced housing dates from the late 19th century when social reformer and Scottish Member of Parliament (MP) Archibald Cameron Corbett built numerous houses on 278 acres of land he purchased from North Park Farm, this was to become known as the Corbett Estate.

A booking hall was added to the east side of Hither Green Station to cater for people living on this new estate. Many of the road names are of Scottish origin, as Corbett was a Scot. Due to his Quaker origins, the area was devoid of a public house and remains so. He gave the land for St Andrew's Church, dedicated to Scotland's patron saint.

==== St. Swithun's Church ====
In November 1888, the new parish of St. Swithun's was created. Designed by Ernest Newton the foundation stone was laid in July 1892 and the church, built of red Wrotham brick with Bath stone windows, was completed in 1904. Its organ previously came from Blenheim Palace.

==== Wesleyan Church, Hither Green Lane ====
The large non-conformist Wesleyan Church, designed by Josiah Gunton, standing in the angle of Hither Green Lane and Wellmeadow Road, was completed in 1900 to accommodate 700 people. It was built by C. Castle & Son of Lower Clapton of red brick with a nave, two aisles, a transept, chancel, organ chamber and galleries on three sides, along with a tall pinnacled tower.

On the night of 11–12 September 1940, the church was destroyed in the Blitz. What was left of the church was torn down and the site was subsequently occupied by council-built flats.

==== Hither Green TMD ====
Hither Green TMD was opened by the Southern Railway in 1933. It remains in use in a reduced capacity as a DB Cargo UK depot.

== Governance ==
Hither Green is part of the Hither Green ward for elections to Lewisham London Borough Council.

== Transport ==
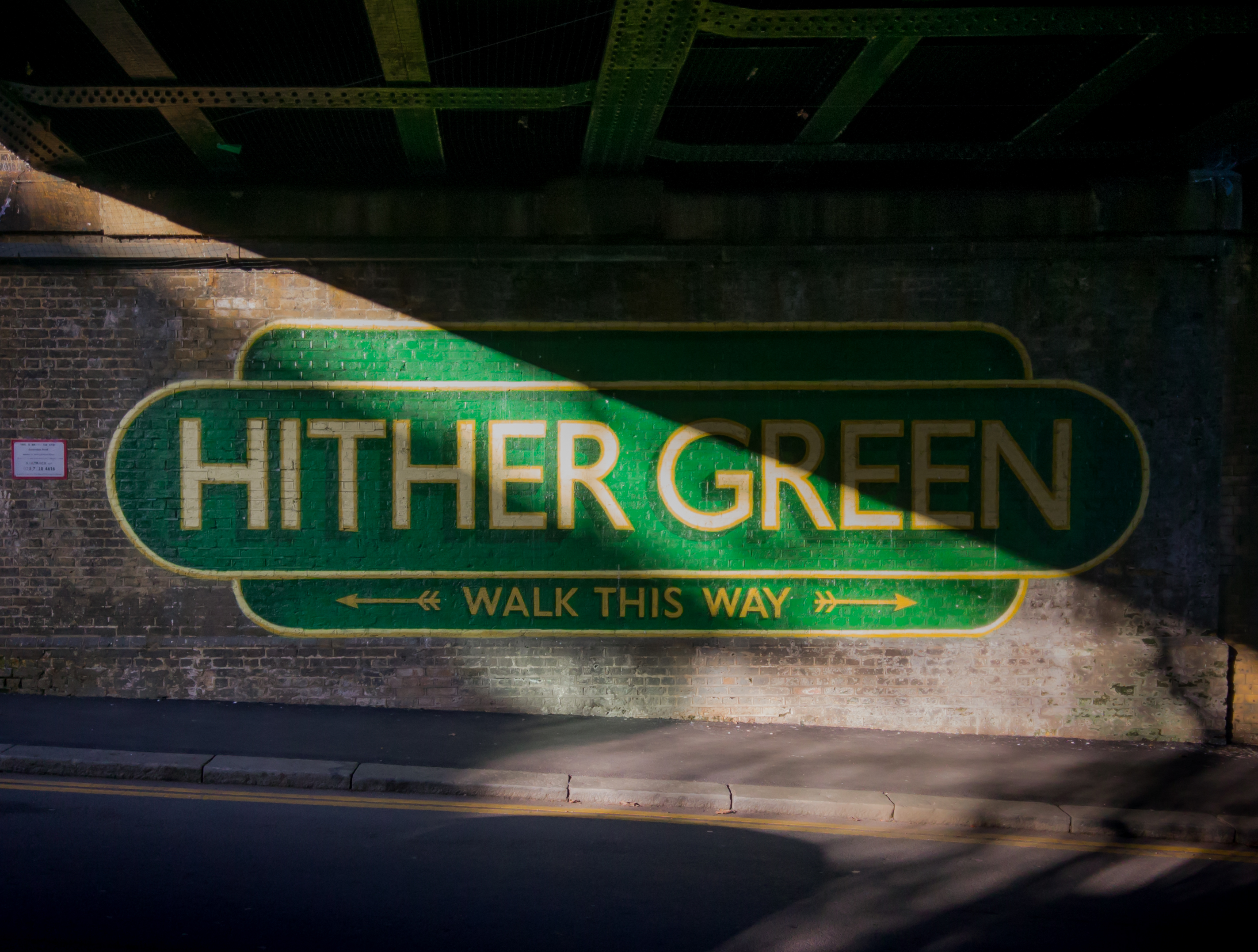
Hither Green mural painted beneath a railway bridge on Ennersdale Road in 2016.

=== Rail ===
Hither Green railway station serves the area with services to London Charing Cross and to London Cannon Street both via Lewisham and as part of a loop service via both Sidcup and Woolwich Arsenal. There are also services to Orpington, Sevenoaks via Orpington and to Gravesend via Sidcup. Hither Green railway station also lies upon the Prime Meridian.

=== Buses ===
Hither Green is also served by several Transport for London bus services that connect it with areas including Lewisham, Eltham, Catford, Sidcup, New Cross, Canada Water and Crystal Palace.

=== Driving ===
The Driving Standards Agency ran a driving test centre in Hither Green – it was one of the largest in south London catering for over 1,000 driving tests each month, before being closed on 1 February 2025.

== Hither Green in the news ==
- "Let's move to Hither Green, London" in The Guardian newspaper
- Park Fever beer and chocolate in Wallpaper magazine
- Hither Green mural from start to finish in News Shopper
- Hither Green in the Evening Standard
- Hither Green in Meridian magazine (p.7)

== Notable inhabitants and former inhabitants ==
- Jude Law – Actor
- Gladys Cooper – Actress
- Dora Jessie Saint (Miss Read) – Author
- Dane Baptiste – Comedian
- Juris Kalnins – Polish musician, philanthropist
- Debbie McGee - Magician's assistant
- Sinéad O'Connor - Irish singer-songwriter and activist
- Libby Welsh - Actor, Producer, and Disability Rights advocate.

== See also ==
- Hither Green Cemetery
- Hither Green railway station
- Hither Green rail crash
