= Pioltello =

- Comune
- Città di Pioltello
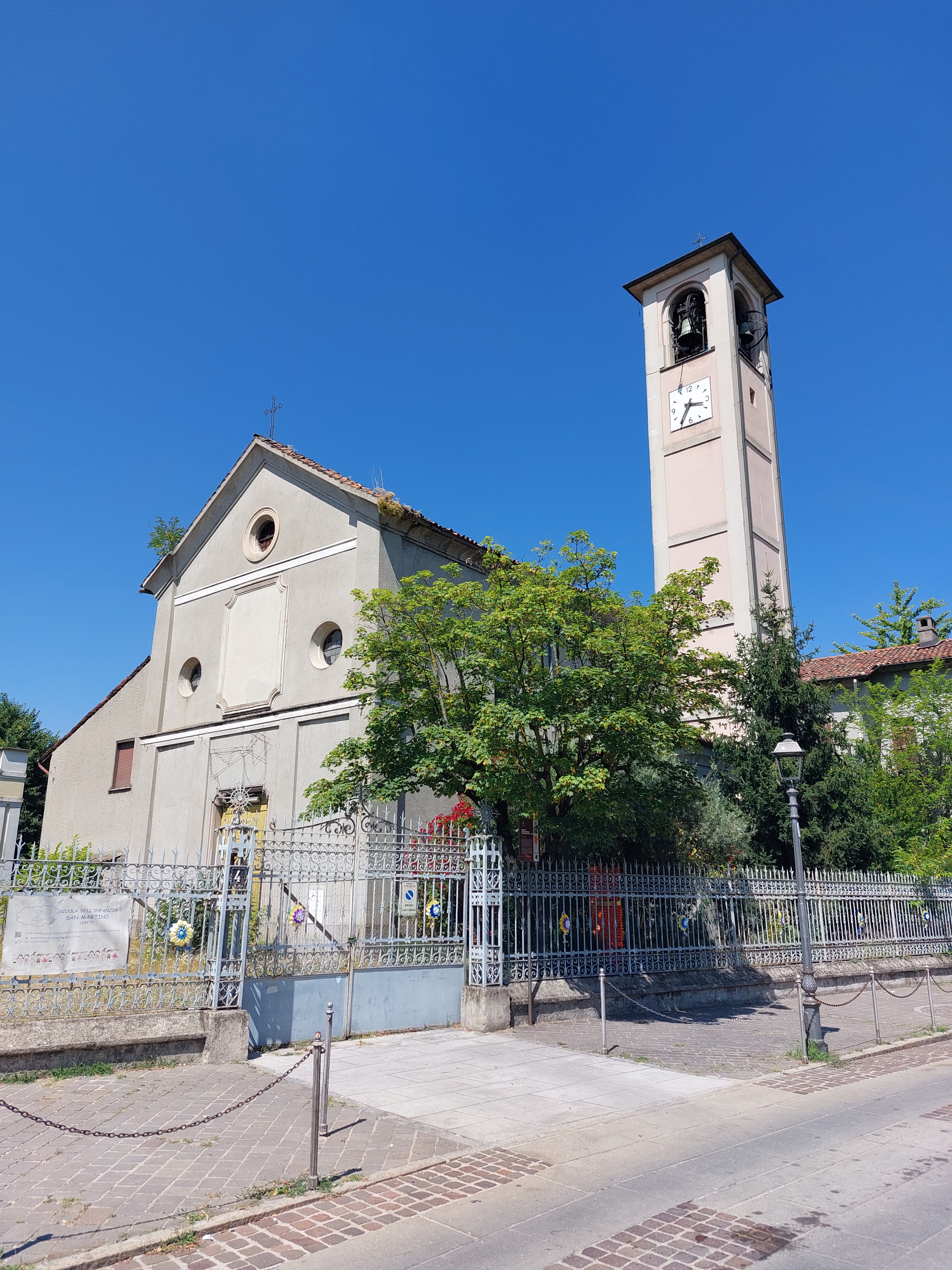
- The church of San Giorgio

- Coat of arms

- Location within Italy Location within Lombardy
- Coordinates: 45°30′N 9°20′E
- Country: Italy
- Region: Lombardy
- Metropolitan city: Milan (MI)
- Frazioni: Limito, Rugacesio, San Felice, Seggiano, Malaspina

Government
  - Mayor: Ivonne Cosciotti

Area
  - Total: 13.09 km^{2} (5.05 sq mi)
- Elevation: 122 m (400 ft)

Population (31 December 2021)
  - Total: 36,051
  - Density: 2,754/km^{2} (7,133/sq mi)
- Demonym: Pioltellesi
- Time zone: UTC+1 (CET)
  - Summer (DST): UTC+2 (CEST)
- Postal code: 20096
- Dialing code: 02
- Website: Official website

Pioltello (Lombard: Pioltell [pjulˈtɛl]) is a comune (municipality) in the Metropolitan City of Milan in the Italian region Lombardy, located about 7 kilometres (4 mi) northeast of Milan.

Pioltello borders the following municipalities: Cernusco sul Naviglio, Vimodrone, Segrate, Rodano, Peschiera Borromeo, Vignate.

Pioltello is served by Pioltello-Limito railway station. Among the churches, is the baroque-style, Roman Catholic Chiesa della Immacolata.

== Physical geography ==
Located about 6 kilometers east of Milan, the territory is between the SP ex SS 11 Padana Superiore (to the north, located between Cernusco sul Naviglio and Cassina de 'Pecchi) and the SP 14 Rivoltana (to the south, located between Rodano and Vignate) and is arranged along the north south axis, with an east west width of a couple of kilometers. This long and narrow stripe conformation is the result of the history of the city, born from the merger on 1 January 1870 of two up to that time independent municipalities: Pioltello and Limito. From the time until today, the territory between the two historic centers has been almost completely urbanized, with the birth of the Seggiano district.

The long and narrow strip is cut by several crossings: the SP 103 Cassanese between Pioltello, Vignate and the Ferdinandea railway, always between Limito and Vignate. The new Porta railway station is under construction, one of the three planned in the Milan area, together with Rogoredo and Rho-Pero. Pioltello is also the terminus of the S6 line of the Milan suburban railway service.

South of the SP 14 Rivoltana since the 70s the residential district of San Felice has risen, extending the urbanized area towards the south and thus bringing the Rivoltana within the urban fabric of the city even if only a small part (only 2 streets) is part of the municipality of Pioltello. In recent years, always south of the SP 14 Rivoltana, the new Malaspina locality has developed on the border with San Felice, which until a few years ago was only the seat of the Niccolò Machiavelli Liceo Scientifico, while now it has become a new and modern residential center. on the edge of the so-called Bosco della Besozza (one of the city parks). Since 2009, the Italian headquarters of the multinational have been transferred to this location3M, located first in nearby San Felice.

Despite the vicissitudes that Pioltello suffered, particularly in the 1960s and 1970s, with a very strong population growth and the birth of low-cost and low-quality residential districts, Pioltello still has large agricultural and green areas, which divide it from Milan and Segrate and bring it closer to the Municipalities of Martesana, of which it is geographically part.

=== Pioltello and the three parks ===
Since 1999 Pioltello has acquired the title of city and the motto with which Pioltello currently presents itself is the city of three parks, where the three parks mentioned are the Parco delle Cascine (defined with a resolution by the former Province of Milan PLIS: Local Park of Supracomunale interest), the Trenzanesio Park (Villa Invernizzi) and the Bosco della Besozza, the latter owned by the municipality and on which one of the urban forests financed by the Lombardy Region is rising.

== History ==
The first document that instead mentions the modern Pioltello still in the Plautellum form dates back to 1020: the place was in fact inhabited for centuries, as evidenced by the discovery in 2009 of a small necropolis dating back to 300 AD near the current town of Seggiano. The other historic district of the city, Limito, is attested by the same source to 1071. Both locations are documented without interruption to this day.

In 1745 the architect Carlo Giuseppe Merlo started work on the facade of the parish church of Sant'Andrea Apostolo, which was completed in 1753.

In the Napoleonic era Pioltello became the capital of a district comprising about forty municipalities of the current Martesana.

In 1869 it was hypothesized the constitution of a Grande Pioltello comprising Briavacca, Limito, Rovagnasco, Rodano and Segrate, but the opposition of the local communities led to a more moderate final measure which only involved the annexation of Limito as of 1 January 1870.

=== Symbols ===
The coat of arms of the Municipality of Pioltello represents both its territorial position (east Milan) and some episodes of its history. The first section on the left presents the red cross on a white background, the symbol of Milan, to represent Pioltello's proximity to the capital. The four green bands on a golden field refer to the coat of arms of the illustrious Milanese family of Trivulzio which, starting from 1499, had been the owner of the fief of Melzo, of which Pioltello was part of at the time. Another example of the municipal coat of arms of the area that shows the green and gold colors of the Trivulzio family is Cologno Monzese. The golden lilieson a silver background they would remember the passage and the allocation of French troops on the territory of this Municipality. Finally, the figure of the two crossed swords would allude to the Battle of Cassano d'Adda which took place in the territory of Pioltello in 1259, when the Milanese troops clashed with those commanded by Ezzelino III da Romano.

=== Honors ===

City Title

– Presidential Decree of 19 November 1999

== Company ==
The history and urban planning of the city have fostered the sense of belonging to the neighborhoods, which territorially coincide in substance with the parishes of San Giorgio (Limito), Sant'Andrea (Pioltello Vecchia), Maria Regina (Pioltello Nuova) and Beata Vergine Assunta (Seggiano).

The social life of the neighborhood and town is quite developed, thanks to the presence of numerous social, cultural and sporting associations that are close to a hundred. To remember, for the importance of the social role played, the presence on the territory of nursery schools of Catholic inspiration. In particular, the Papa Giovanni XXIII Nursery School in the parish of Santa Maria Regina di Pioltello Nuova, the San Martino Kindergarten (1904), which stands at the Old Church of Limito and the Antonio Gorra Kindergarten (1902), which stands in the historic center of Pioltello, both of which have been active for over a hundred years.

The social fabric of the city of Pioltello sees the presence of numerous immigrants, who make up about 24% of the population. In the Satellite district, 30% of the children attending kindergarten and elementary schools are of foreign origin. Most of the immigrants reside in the Satellite district, in the Pioltello Nuova district, and in the Piazza Garibaldi district., in the Seggiano district. The presence of a growing percentage of people with different habits and customs, in a context characterized by marked poverty, contributes to creating a climate of distrust and discomfort in the neighborhoods where this presence is more significant. Public administrations have tackled the phenomenon with initiatives such as the Intercultural Consultation, one of the few experiments in the area of continuous dialogue between foreign communities and Italian citizens.

Two main festivals take place in Pioltello, both of which have recently been established:

- The Festa dello Sport (formerly "Festa Cittadina"), in the first week of June
- The Santa Lucia Fair, in December
- The Caravan Festival of 100 Colors, in May

The patron saint of the city is Sant'Andrea (celebrated on 30 November), patron of the oldest parish. For historical reasons, the Marian Jubilee is remembered, which takes place in Pioltello Vecchia every 25 years, continuously since 1780. Another deeply felt religious festival is the procession of Lu Signuri di li Fasci which takes place every Good Friday in Seggiano, where this tradition is it was brought by the numerous original community of Pietraperzia (Enna). A Pro Loco has been operating since 2003.

=== Demographic evolution ===
- 900 in 1751
- 1 314 in 1771
- 1 400 in 1805
- 1 471 in 1809 after the annexation of Trenzanesio and Limito
- 1 886 in 1811 after the annexation of Briavacca, Lucino and Rodano
- 1 821 in 1853
- 1,881 in 1861
- 2 896 in 1871 after the annexation of Limito

Inhabitants surveyed

=== Ethnicities and foreign minorities ===
According to ISTAT data as of 1 January 2017, the foreign resident population was 9 009 people, equal to 24% of the population. The nationalities most represented on the basis of their percentage of the total resident population were:

- Romania 1 109
- Ecuador 1 080
- Pakistan 937
- Peru 884
- Egypt 800
- Albania 568
- Morocco 367
- Bangladesh 353
- Philippines 318
- Ukraine 240

In percentage terms, Pioltello is the second largest municipality in the metropolitan city with the highest foreign population. The first among the metropolitan municipalities is Baranzate, with 33% of the foreign population.

== Culture ==
The cultural panorama of Pioltello is characterized by the presence of some public, private and voluntary agencies, among which we mention:

- the Civic School of Music
- the Alessandro Manzoni Municipal Library
- the UCI Cinemas multiplex cinema
- the MAF Fonderia d'Arte, which moved to Pioltello a few years ago, author of bronze works including one of the doors of the Milan Cathedral and around which an Association of local artists has been established
- Throne of Silence, sculpture in Don Civilini square by the Japanese artist Kyoji Nagatani.

=== Cinema ===
Some parts of the films La vita agra (1964) by Carlo Lizzani and Delitto d'amore (1974) by Luigi Comencini were shot in Pioltello.

== Economy ==
Two large companies have their headquarters in Pioltello: Esselunga (Via Giambologna 1) and the Italian branch of 3M

=== Crafts ===
In the handicraft sector, wrought iron working for public buildings is very widespread.

== Administration ==
Period		Mayor	Party	In charge of	Note
1860	1867	Formenti Francesco		Mayor	
1867	1876	Trasi Giovanni Battista		Mayor	
1876	1879	Romanone Damiano		Mayor	
1879	1888	Trasi Cesare		Mayor	
1888	1920	Motta Luigi		Mayor	
1920	23 April 1922	Sparti Francesco		Mayor	
23 April 1922	1923	Bernardoni Luigi		Royal Commissioner	
1923	25 July 1926	Borgonovo Andrea		Mayor	
25 July 1926	1 February 1941	Borgonovo Andrea		Podestà	
1 February 1941	22 April 1941	Oreglio Mario		Podestà	
22 April 1941	2 September 1943	Oreglio Mario		Prefectural Commissioner	
2 September 1943	15 August 1944	De Castiglione Aurelio		Prefectural Commissioner	
15 August 1944	12 May 1945	Mancini Secondo		Prefectural Commissioner	
12 May 1945	1946	Pagani Carlo		Mayor	
1946	9 June 1946	Citelli Emilio		Mayor	
9 June 1946	1965	Gadda Luigi		Mayor	
1965	20 June 1966	Luise Gioacchino		Mayor	
20 June 1966	1967	Palladino Pietro		Prefectural Commissioner	
1967	1973	Luise Gioacchino		Mayor	
1973	8 July 1985	Pozzi Carlo		Mayor	
8 July 1985	26 March 1990	Rossetti Michele		Mayor	
26 March 1990	30 June 1993	Gironi Franco		Mayor	
30 June 1993	18 December 1996	Torre Alberto		Mayor	
18 December 1996	29 March 1997	Velardita Francesco Saverio		Prefectural Commissioner	
29 March 1997	28 May 2006	De Gaspari Mario		Mayor	
28 May 2006	30 January 2014	Concas Antonio		Mayor	
30 January 2014	9 June 2014	Cirelli Cristiana		Prefectural Commissioner	
9 June 2014	3 June 2015	Carrer Cristina		Mayor	
3 June 2015	20 June 2016	Tripodi Alessandra		Prefectural Commissioner	
20 June 2016	In Charge	Cosciotti Ivonne		Mayor	
