= Invernizzi =

Invernizzi is a surname. Notable people with the surname include:

- Corrado Invernizzi (born 1965), Italian actor
- Giovanni Invernizzi (disambiguation), multiple people
- Roberta Invernizzi (born 1966), Italian soprano
- Marco Invernizzi (born 1975), Italian bonsai artist
- Marcia A. Invernizzi, Italian professor and author specialized in Reading Education

== See also ==
- 43957 Invernizzi, a main-belt asteroid
