= Pioltello–Limito railway station =

Railway station in Italy

Pioltello–Limito
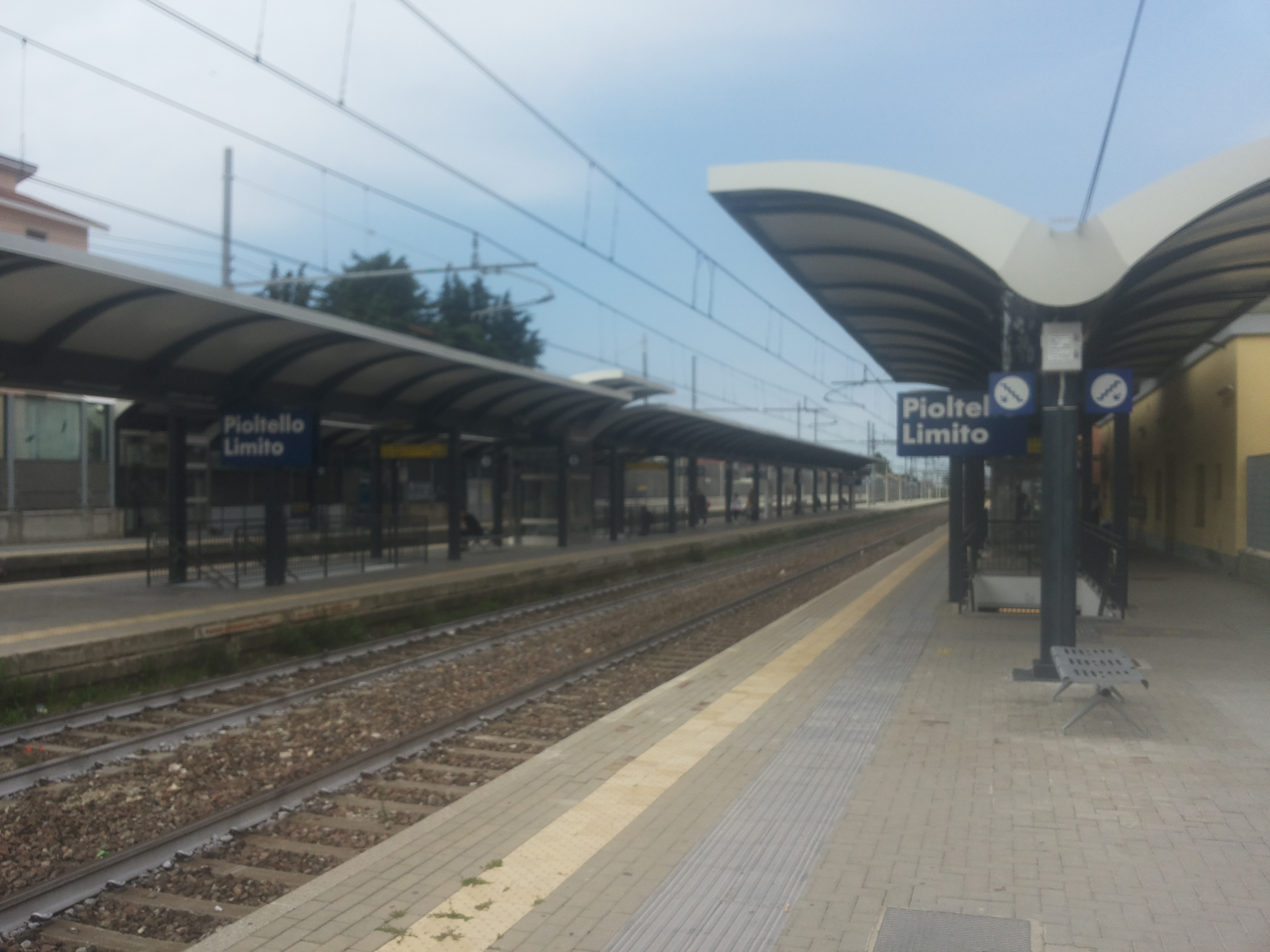

General information
- Location: Via Stazione 1 Pioltello, Milan, Lombardy; Italy
- Coordinates: 45°29′10″N 09°19′46″E
- Operator: Rete Ferroviaria Italiana
- Line: Milan–Venice
- Distance: 12.407 km (7.709 mi) from Milano Centrale
- Train operators: Trenord

Construction
- Architect: Antonio Monestiroli

Other information
- Fare zone: STIBM: Mi4
- Classification: Silver

History
- Opened: 1846; 180 years ago

Services
Preceding station	Trenord	Following station
Segrate towards Varese	Line S5 (Milan suburban railway service)	Vignate towards Treviglio
Segrate towards Novara	Line S6 (Milan suburban railway service)	Vignate towards Treviglio
Location
- Location within Lombardy Location within Northern Italy Location within Italy

Pioltello–Limito (Italian: Stazione di Pioltello–Limito) is a railway station in Pioltello, Lombardy, Italy. The station opened in 1846 and is located on the Milan–Venice railway. The train services are operated by Trenord.

The station opened as Limito in 1846 and was renamed in 1908 to its current name.

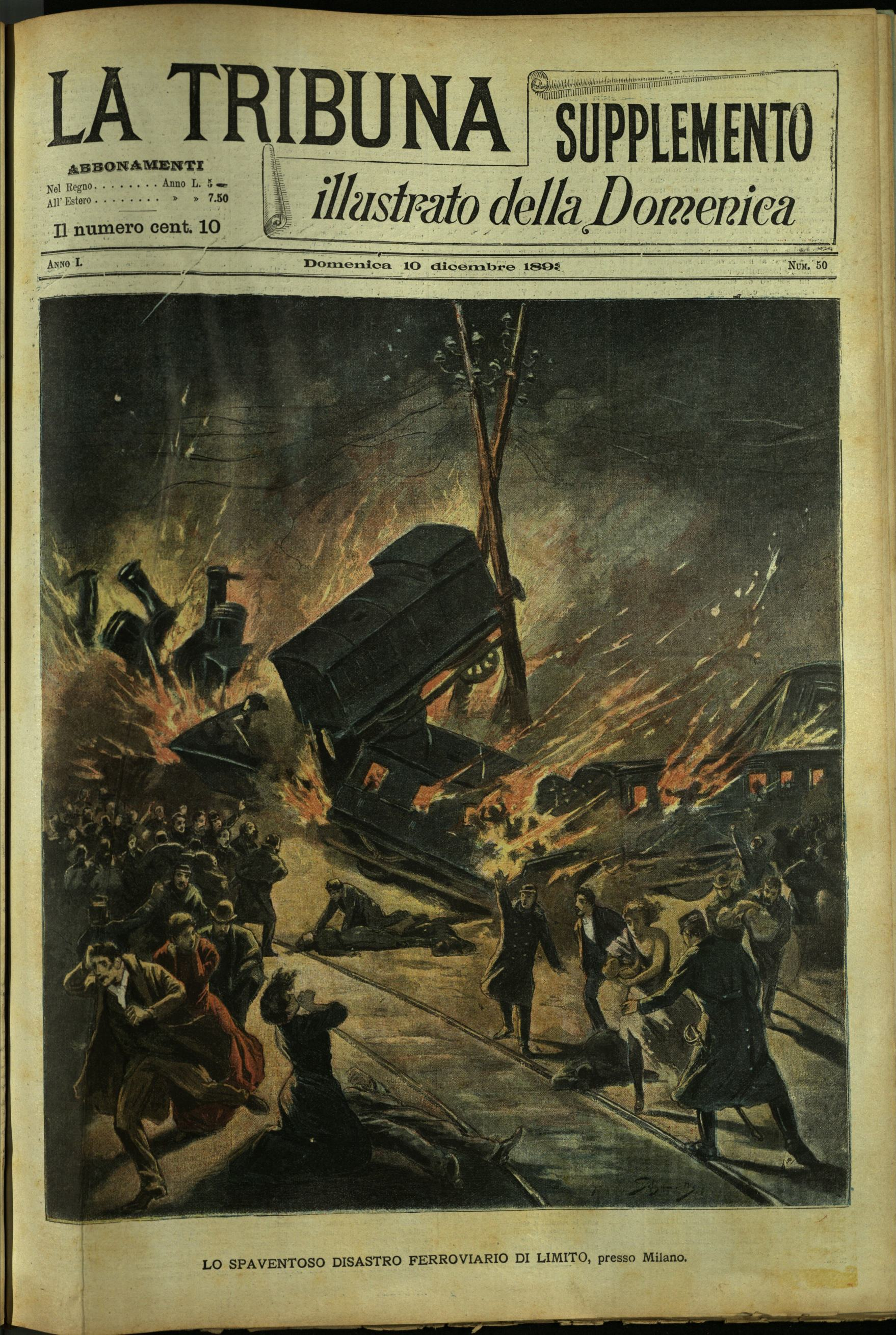
La Tribuna illustrata issue from 10 December 1893, about the disaster of Limito.

In the early 2000s, with the quadrupling of the line and the launch of the suburban railway of Milan, the station was upgraded and expanded, becoming an interchange point between regional and suburban trains. The station also received a new passenger building, built next to the original one, dating from the construction of the line. The new passenger building was opened on 22 May 2011.

It became the location of the 25 January 2018 train derailment, which left two people dead and over 100 injured. Another, deadlier accident had taken place on November 28, 1893, with 40 people dead and 22 injured.

== Train services ==
The station is served by the following service(s):

- Express services (Treno regionale) Milan – Treviglio – Brescia – Verona
- Express services (Treno regionale) Milan – Pioltello – Bergamo
- Regional services (Treno regionale) Milan – Treviglio – Brescia
- Milan Metropolitan services (S5) Varese – Rho – Milan – Treviglio
- Milan Metropolitan services (S6) Novara – Rho – Milan – Treviglio

== See also ==
- Milan suburban railway network
