= Carlo Raspagni =

20th-century Italian luthier

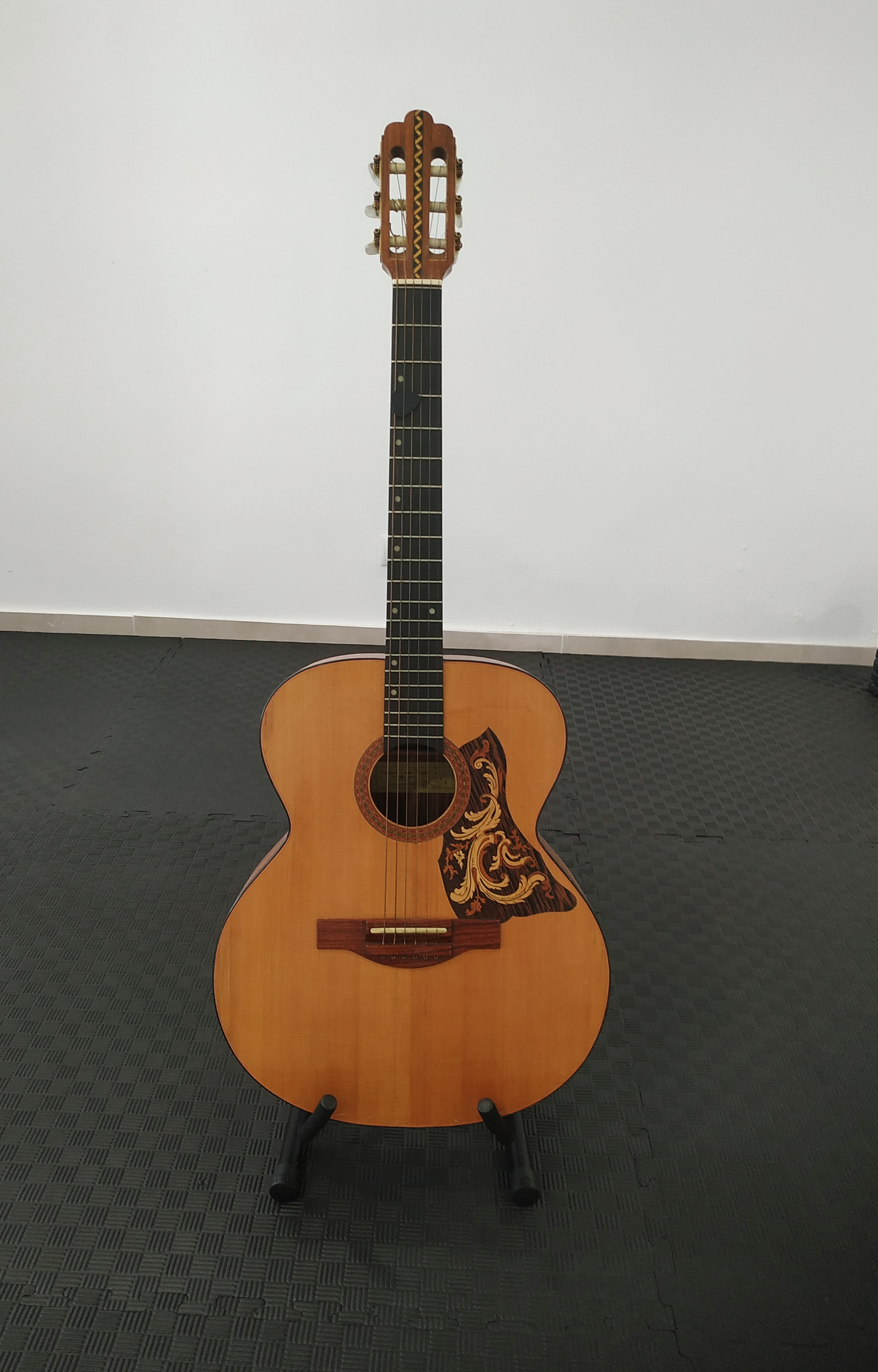
- Guitar by Carlo Raspagni
- Born: 14 October 1925; Vignate, Italy
- Died: 30 August 1999 (aged 73); Vignate, Italy
- Occupation: Luthier

Carlo Raspagni (14 October 1925 in Vignate – 30 August 1999 in Vignate) was an Italian luthier.

== Biography ==
Raspagni began working as a luthier at the end of the Second World War in his uncle's workshop, Erminio Travi. He later travelled to Milan to learn instrument building techniques. He was hired by the Monzino industry and began to work on assembly lines, developing as a luthier. In 1960, after ten years of working in Milan, he set up his own shop.

Raspagni became close friends with renowned luthiers of the time, including Giulietti, Naldi and his teacher Gallinotti.

Giorgio Gaber played Raspagni guitars designed especially for him. Luigi Tenco has also played a guitar built by Raspagni for his entire career.

Other artists that have commissioned guitars from him include Enzo Jannacci, Cochi e Renato, Adriano Celentano, Fabrizio De André, Lino Patruno, Caterina Valente, Tony Renis, Franco Mussida, and many others.

In 1984 he donated a guitar, built with a maple case and a spruce top, to Pope John Paul II.

With the assistance of the Milanese government and Vignate Municipality, Raspagni opened a luthier school where he taught his techniques on building acoustic and classical guitars.
