= Vignate railway station =

Railway station in Italy

Vignate

General information
- Location: Via Manzoni; Vignate, Milan, Lombardy; Italy
- Coordinates: 45°29′39″N 09°22′32″E
- Operator: Rete Ferroviaria Italiana
- Line: Milan–Venice
- Distance: 16.200 km (10.066 mi) from Milano Centrale
- Platforms: 2
- Tracks: 2
- Train operators: Trenord

Other information
- Fare zone: STIBM: Mi5
- Classification: Silver

History
- Opened: 1889; 137 years ago
- Rebuilt: 2009

Services
Preceding station	Trenord	Following station
Pioltello-Limito towards Varese	Line S5 (Milan suburban railway service)	Melzo towards Treviglio
Pioltello-Limito towards Novara	Line S6 (Milan suburban railway service)	Melzo towards Treviglio
Location
- Location within Lombardy Location within Northern Italy Location within Italy

Vignate railway station is a railway station in Italy. Located on the Milan–Venice railway, it serves the town of Vignate.

== Services ==
The station is served by lines S5 and S6 of the Milan suburban railway network, operated by the Lombard railway company Trenord.

== See also ==
- Milan suburban railway network
