= Melzo =

- Comune
- Città di Melzo
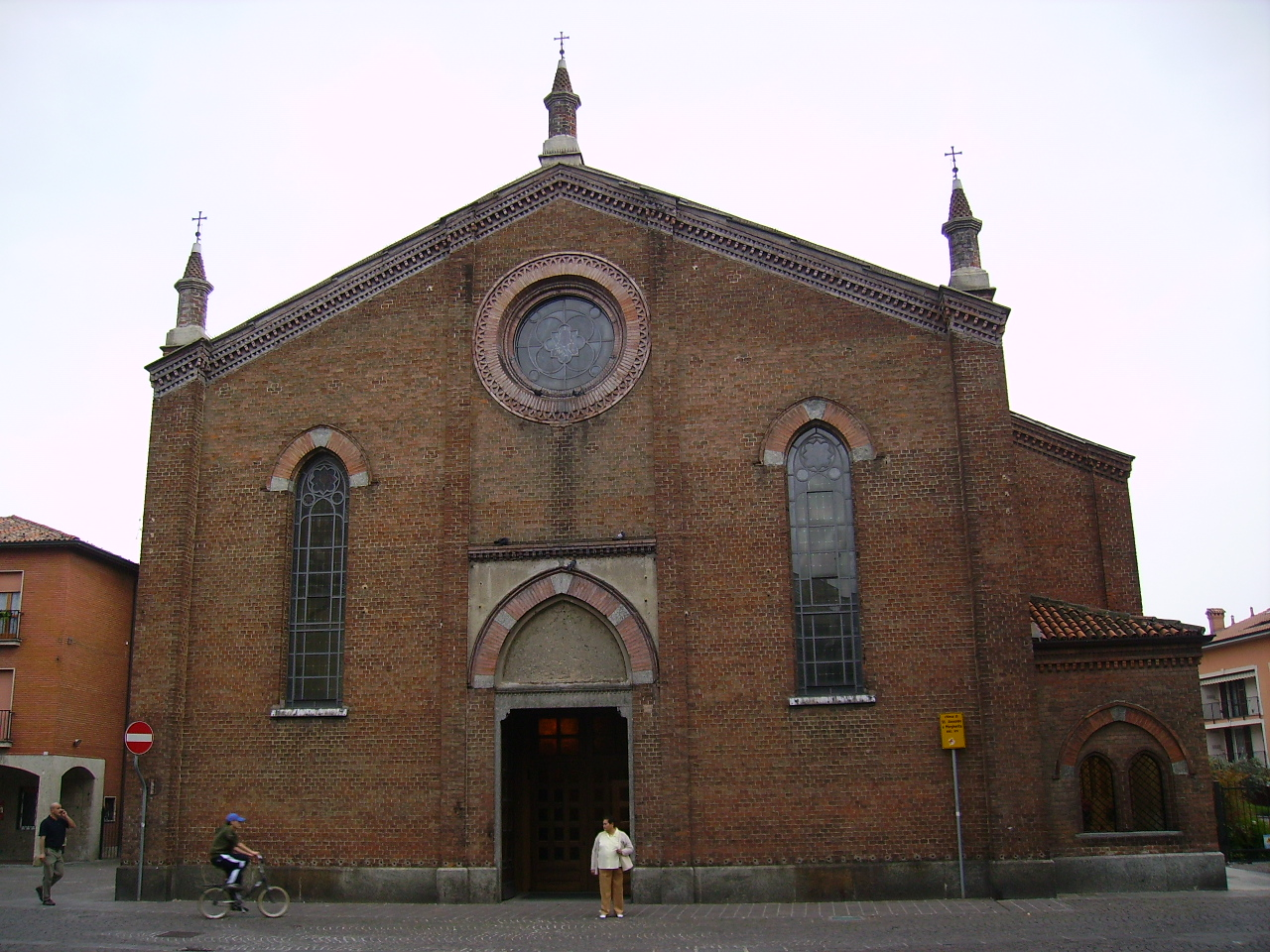
- Church of San Alessandro

- Coat of arms

- Location within Italy Location within Lombardy
- Coordinates: 45°30′N 9°25′E
- Country: Italy
- Region: Lombardy
- Metropolitan city: Milan (MI)

Government
  - Mayor: Antonio Fusè

Area
  - Total: 9.7 km^{2} (3.7 sq mi)
- Elevation: 118 m (387 ft)

Population (January 2009)
  - Total: 18,400
  - Density: 1,900/km^{2} (4,900/sq mi)
- Demonym: Melzesi
- Time zone: UTC+1 (CET)
  - Summer (DST): UTC+2 (CEST)
- Postal code: 20066
- Dialing code: 02
- Website: Official website

Melzo (Lombard: Melz [ˈmɛls]) is a comune (municipality) in the Province of Milan in the Italian region Lombardy, located about 20 kilometres (12 mi) east of Milan. As of 31 December 2004, it had a population of 18,400 and an area of 9.7 square kilometres (3.7 mi^{2}).

Melzo borders the following municipalities: Gorgonzola, Pozzuolo Martesana, Cassina de' Pecchi, Vignate, Truccazzano, Liscate.

Melzo received the honorary title of city with a presidential decree on March 14, 1952. It is served by Melzo railway station.

== Overview ==
Melzo is a town of approximately 20,000 inhabitants.

For centuries, Melzo was an important agricultural centre, home to major food industry companies such as Galbani and Invernizzi. In recent decades, the town has developed into a key logistics hub within the Milan metropolitan area.

Melzo also hosts one of Italy’s most renowned cinemas, the Arcadia Cinema. Its main auditorium, Sala Energia, was recognised with the Best Hall in Europe award by the International Cinema Technology Association (ICTA).

== History ==
Due to its strategic location, Melzo maintained historical relations with both Milan and Venice.

From the 16th century onward, Melzo’s economy was primarily based on agriculture. By the 19th century, it had developed into an industrial centre focused on the textile sector. In the 20th century, its economic base shifted to the dairy industry, particularly the processing of milk and the production of various types of cheese.

== Fiera delle Palme ==
The Fiera delle Palme (Palm Fair) is one of the most important annual events in the town of Melzo, located in the Metropolitan City of Milan, Lombardy, Italy. It is traditionally held in April, coinciding with Palm Sunday.

The fair dates back several centuries and celebrates Melzo's cultural heritage through a variety of events and exhibitions. The 404th edition is scheduled to take place from 10 to 14 April 2025.

The event features food stalls, artisan markets, cultural exhibitions, and livestock displays. It also includes amusement rides and entertainment for both children and adults. A series of pre-fair events titled Aspettando la Fiera (Waiting for the Fair) is also organised in the weeks leading up to the main festival.

== Demographic evolution ==
Historical population

Year	Pop.	±%
1861	2,524	—
1871	2,767	+9.6%
1881	3,106	+12.3%
1901	4,426	+42.5%
1911	4,526	+2.3%

Year	Pop.	±%
1921	4,915	+8.6%
1931	6,570	+33.7%
1936	7,308	+11.2%
1951	8,719	+19.3%
1961	12,797	+46.8%

Year	Pop.	±%
1971	17,092	+33.6%
1981	17,996	+5.3%
1991	18,430	+2.4%
2001	18,546	+0.6%

Source: Data from ISTAT

== Twin towns ==
Melzo is twinned with:

- Vilafranca del Penedès, Spain
