= Melzo railway station =

Railway station in Italy

Melzo
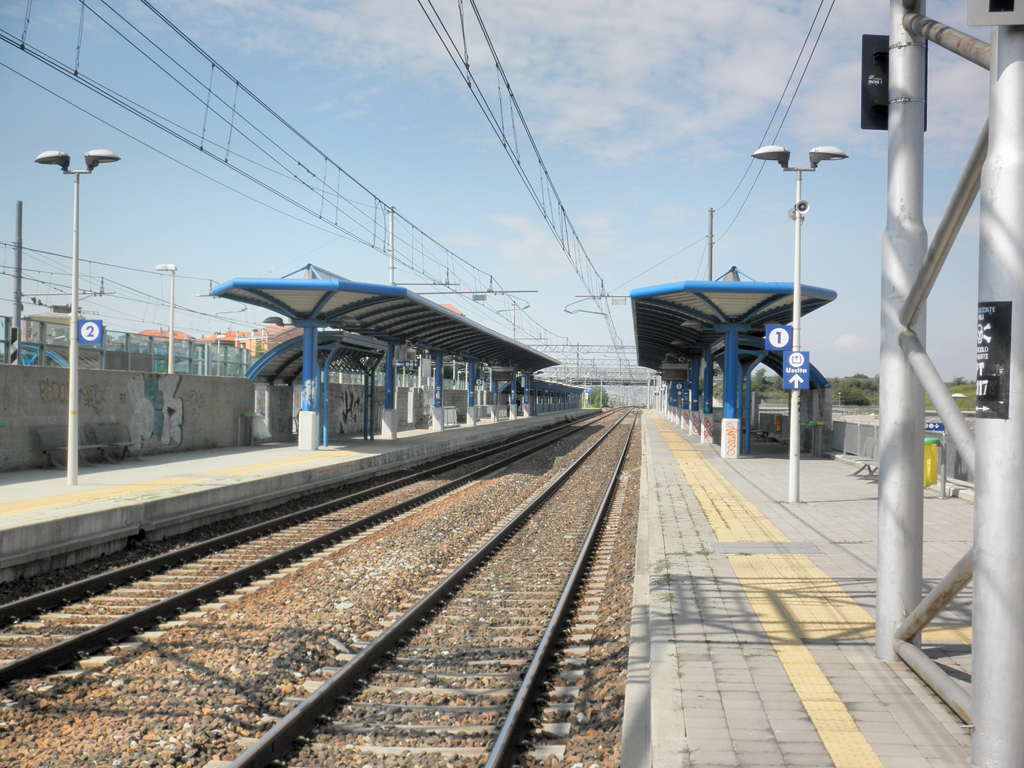

General information
- Location: Piazza Cavour 35; Melzo, Milan, Lombardy; Italy
- Coordinates: 45°30′07″N 09°25′09″E
- Operator: Rete Ferroviaria Italiana
- Line: Milan–Venice
- Distance: 19.600 km (12.179 mi) from Milano Centrale
- Platforms: 2
- Tracks: 2
- Train operators: Trenord

Other information
- Fare zone: STIBM: Mi5
- Classification: Silver

History
- Opened: 17 February 1846; 180 years ago
- Rebuilt: 2009

Services
Preceding station	Trenord	Following station
Vignate towards Varese	Line S5 (Milan suburban railway service)	Pozzuolo Martesana towards Treviglio
Vignate towards Novara	Line S6 (Milan suburban railway service)	Pozzuolo Martesana towards Treviglio
Location
- Location within Lombardy Location within Northern Italy Location within Italy

Melzo is a railway station in Italy. Located on the Milan–Venice railway, it serves the town of Melzo.

== Services ==
Melzo is served by lines S5 and S6 of the Milan suburban railway network, operated by the Lombard railway company Trenord.

== See also ==
- Milan suburban railway network
