= HGR =

HGR may refer to:

- Hagerstown Regional Airport, in Maryland, US
- Hither Green railway station, London, England
