= James Gordon Melville Turner =

British merchant seaman

James Gordon Melville Turner GC (1907 – 5 November 1967) was a British merchant seaman. He was awarded the Empire Gallantry Medal (EGM) for actions on the cargo ship Manaar on 6 September 1939. The ship was one of the first British merchantmen sunk during the Second World War. The award of the EGM was gazetted on 13 October 1939, and the medal was exchanged for the George Cross (GC) in 1943. Turner was also awarded the Lloyd's War Medal for Bravery at Sea, and a gold medal by the Liverpool Shipwreck and Humane Society.

Turner was the radio officer on SS Manaar, a 150 metres (490 ft) cargo steamer of 7,000 gross register tons (20,000 m^{3}) built in 1917 and operated by the Brocklebank Line. En route from Liverpool to Calcutta, the vessel was attacked by the German submarine U-38 at 38°20′N 10°50′W, in the northern Atlantic Ocean about 120 miles (190 km) northwest of Cape St Vincent and about 80 miles (130 km) west of Cape Roca. The merchant vessel returned fire, the first time that a merchantman had fired at a U-boat in the war. Turner remained at his post, sending an SOS.

When most of the crew abandoned the stricken ship, Turner was accidentally left behind with two wounded crewmates, described in the medal citation as lascars. He was ordered to escape to the master's boat, but refused to go until the two other crewmen had also been rescued. While under fire from U-38, Turner tried to launch two lifeboats, but one filled with water and the other was destroyed by enemy action with one of the wounded crew inside. He put the other man in the waterlogged boat, and they both escaped to the master's boat. U-38 sank Manaar with torpedoes. Seven of the 62 crew were killed, and survivors were rescued by the merchantmen Carvalho Araujo, Castelbianco and Mars.

When a ship on which Turner subsequently sailed was also torpedoed he lost a leg, then spent the remainder of the war in a German prisoner-of-war camp.

Turner survived the war, but was one of the 49 people killed in the Hither Green rail crash on Sunday 5 November 1967. At the time of his death, he was living in Staplecross in Sussex. He was survived by his wife and two children.

A painting of Turner by Bernard Hailstone is in the Government Art Collection, on display at the Ministry of Defence in London.
