= Antonio Monestiroli =

Italian architect (1940–2019)

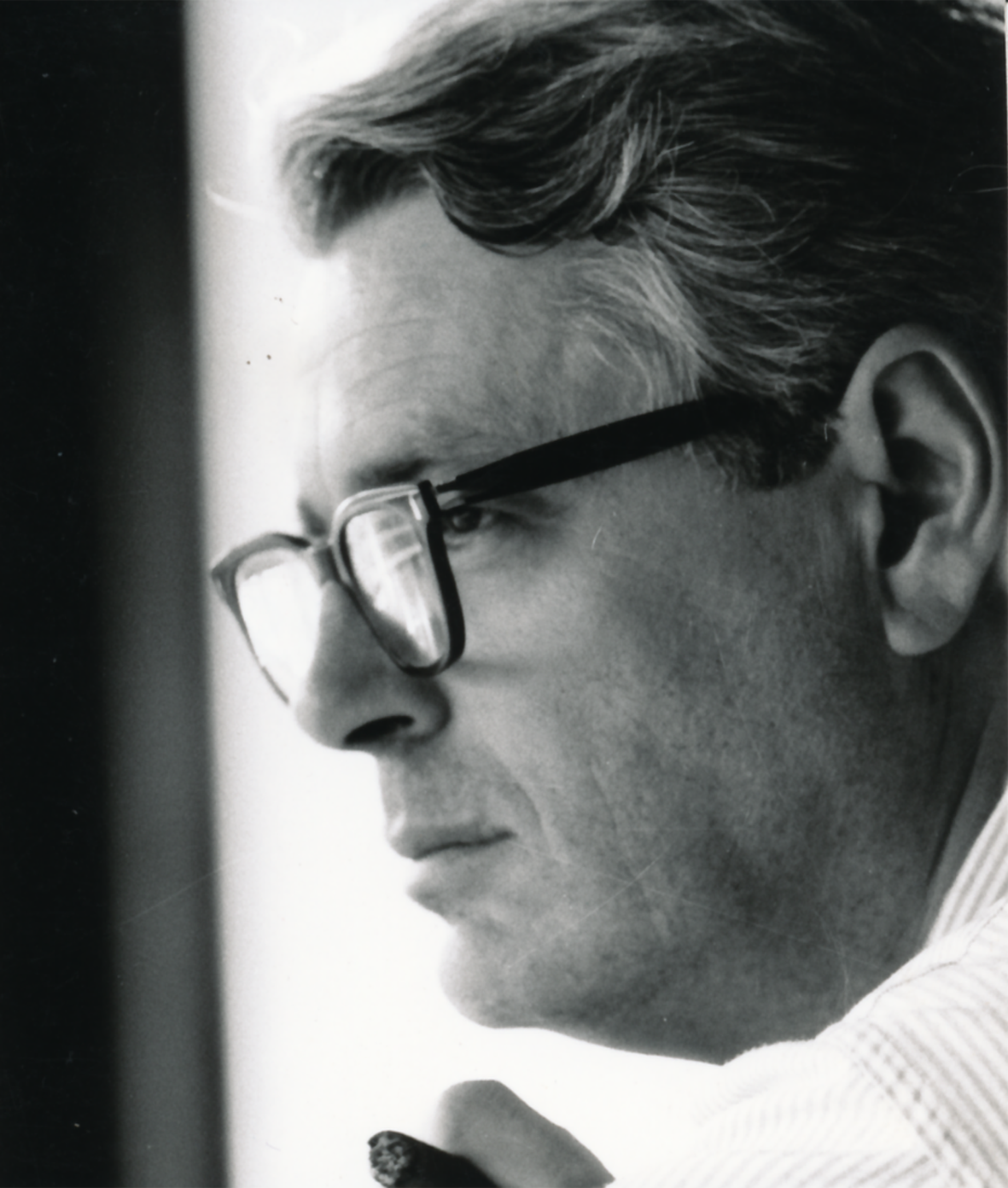
- Born: 10 June 1940; Milan, Kingdom of Italy
- Died: 8 December 2019 (aged 79); Milan, Italy
- Education: Polytechnic University of Milan
- Occupations: Architect, architectural theorist, academic

Antonio Monestiroli (10 June 1940 – 8 December 2019) was an Italian architect, architectural theorist, and academic. A leading figure of the Milan school of architecture, he was a professor of architectural composition at the Polytechnic University and served as dean of its Faculty of Architecture at the Bovisa campus.

== Life and career ==
Monestiroli graduated in architecture from the Polytechnic University of Milan in 1965 under Franco Albini. Between 1968 and 1972 he worked as an assistant and collaborator to Aldo Rossi. He began teaching architectural composition at the Polytechnic University in 1970 and also taught at the Universities of Pescara and IUAV Venice. From 1988 to 1994 he directed the Department of Architectural Design at the Polytechnic University and edited the journal Quaderni di Architettura.

His principal architectural works included a theatre in Udine (1974), a square in Ancona (1978), a retirement home in Galliate (1982–1989), the extension of Voghera Cemetery (1995–2000), the extension of the cemetery of San Michele in Isola in Venice (1998), a sports facility in Limbiate (1998), and the Pioltello–Limito railway station (2003–2010). His urban planning projects included proposals for Les Halles in Paris, the Bologna railway junction, Porta Genova and the Bovisa campus in Milan, Berlin's Spree Island, the port of Patras, and the historic centre of Salerno.

He was a member of the Accademia di San Luca from 1999.

Monestiroli died in Milan on 8 December 2019.

== Sources ==
- Antonio Monestiroli. Progetti 1967–1987. Rome: Kappa. 1988.
- Ferrari, Massimo, ed. (2001). Antonio Monestiroli. Opere, progetti, studi di architettura. Milan: Electa.
