= Chiesa della Immacolata, Pioltello =

Roman Catholic church in Lombardy, Italy

Coordinates: 45°30′08″N 9°19′44″E

The Chiesa della Immacolata or church of the Immaculate Conception is a baroque-style, Roman Catholic church in the town of Pioltello, region of Lombardy, Italy.

== History ==
The current church, erected in 1748, began as a family chapel commissioned by Elisabetta Giulia Ferrario Stoppani.
