= Hither Green marshalling yard =

Coordinates: 51.4413°N 0.0098°E

Hither Green marshalling yard, is a large railway marshalling yard designed for the concentration of freight traffic to and from South East London, and for transfer to other yards in London. It is situated on the north side of the South Eastern Main Line between Hither Green and Grove Park stations. The facility was conceived and built by the South Eastern Railway after 1895, but by the time it opened in 1899 this railway had become part of the South Eastern and Chatham Railway.

== History ==
Freight traffic was considered to be of minor importance for much of the existence of the South Eastern Railway, but during the early 1890s the situation began to change. A growth in freight traffic was experienced to and from London, Kent and the Continent, and also for transfer to other railways in the north of England. This traffic was beginning to overwhelm the existing facilities at Bricklayers Arms which was also poorly sited with respect to transfer freight using the East London Line. Following the opening of Hither Green railway station in 1895 plans were therefore made for the construction of a new marshaling yard nearby. This location gave excellent access to the South Eastern Main Line and also had a connection with the Dartford Loop Line. It provided easy links to the neighbouring London, Brighton and South Coast Railway, and the Great Eastern, Great Northern, and Midland Railways via East London Line. The new facility opened in 1899 after the formation of the South Eastern and Chatham Railway.

The yard passed in to Southern Railway (SR) ownership in 1923 and fulfilled an important part in its plans for the re-organisation of freight traffic in South London, and connections with other railways. New junctions were created in the period 1927–1933. During the Second World War the rail yard was also a frequent target of enemy action.

The yards passed into British Railways ownership in 1948, and in 1960 a new freight depot opened south of St Mildreds Road, handling at its peak over two million tonnes a year of continental fruit and vegetables. However, following the decline of rail freight the St Mildreds site was developed to become the Up side Electric Multiple Unit stabling roads of Grove Park depot. All roads provide Third rail 750 volt DC traction current. The Southeastern Safety Training Centre was also built here.

== Motive power depot ==
The Southern Railway opened a new motive power depot to the south of the station in 1933. In 1947, the sheds were the scene of a serious boiler explosion, where both driver and fireman were severely scalded, but survived. The depot closed to steam in 1961 and was converted to Hither Green Traction Maintenance Depot.

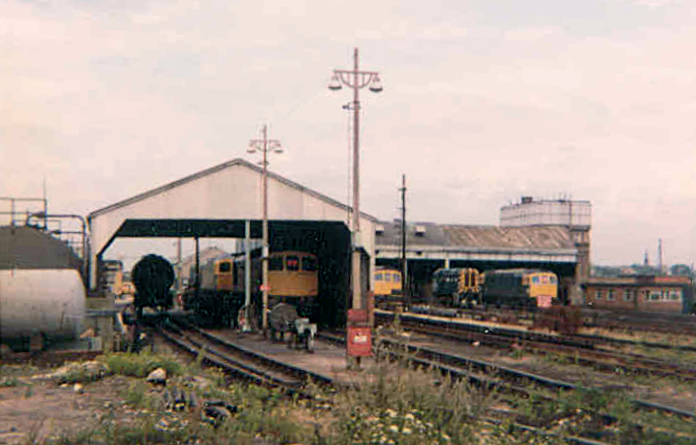
Hither Green TMD in August 1980. Engines present include Class 33 locos and Class 08 shunters
