= Hither Green (ward) =

Electoral ward in London, England

- Electoral ward for the Lewisham London Borough Council
- Borough: Lewisham
- County: Greater London
- Population: 20,148 (2021)
- Major settlements: Hither Green
- Area: 2.343 km²

Current electoral ward
- Created: 2022
- Councillors: 3

Hither Green is an electoral ward in the Borough of Lewisham. The ward was first used in the 2022 elections and elects three councillors to Lewisham London Borough Council.

== Geography ==
The ward is named after the Hither Green area.

== Councillors ==
Election	Councillors		
2022	Yemisi Anifowose (Labour)	Mark Ingleby (Labour)	Kim Powell (Labour)

== Elections ==
=== 2022 ===
Hither Green (3)
Party	Candidate	Votes	%	±%
Labour	Yemisi Anifowose	2,537	65.5	
Labour	Kim Powell*	2,230	57.6	
Labour	Mark Ingleby*	2,125	54.9	
Green	Corin Ashwell	833	21.5	
Green	Dami Crossley	809	20.9	
Liberal Democrats	Jane Alaszewska	691	17.8	
Liberal Democrats	Julian Hawkins	534	13.8	
Conservative	Jonathan Crozier	521	13.4	
Liberal Democrats	Godfried Gyechie	470	12.1	
Conservative	Shane Hughes	451	11.6	
Conservative	Greg Stevens	420	10.8	
Turnout			32.2	
Labour win (new seat)				
Labour win (new seat)				
Labour win (new seat)				
