= Hither Green railway station =

National Rail station in London, England

Hither Green
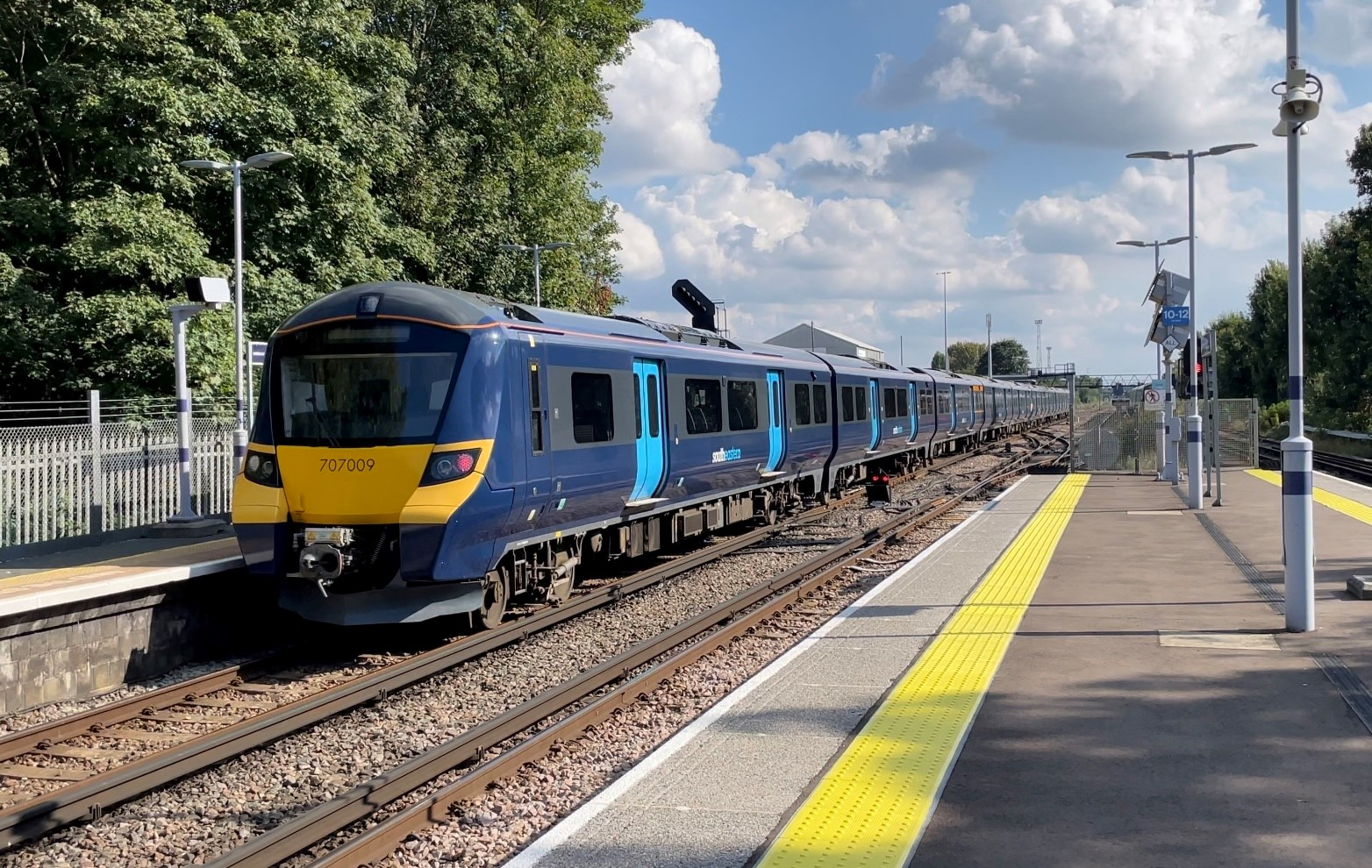
- Interactive map of Hither Green

General information
- Location: Hither Green
- Local authority: London Borough of Lewisham
- Managed by: Southeastern
- Station code: HGR
- DfT category: C2
- Number of platforms: 6
- Fare zone: 3

National Rail annual entry and exit
- 2020–21: ▼0.833 million
- Interchange: ▼0.126 million
- 2021–22: ▲1.959 million
- Interchange: ▲0.298 million
- 2022–23: ▲2.440 million
- Interchange: ▲0.438 million
- 2023–24: ▲2.689 million
- Interchange: ▼0.415 million
- 2024–25: ▲2.899 million
- Interchange: ▼0.212 million

Key dates
- 1 June 1895: Opened

Other information
- External links: Departures; Facilities
- Coordinates: 51.4519°N 0.0008°W

Hither Green is a railway station located in Hither Green in the London Borough of Lewisham, south-east London. It is 7 miles 16 chains (11.6 km) down the line from London Charing Cross and is situated between Lewisham and either Grove Park or Lee depending on the route.

It is a busy commuter station with services to several London termini (Cannon Street, Charing Cross and London Bridge) and destinations to other parts of south-east London and the south-east of England (Orpington and Sevenoaks on the South Eastern Main Line, and Dartford and Gravesend on the Dartford Loop Line).

It is in London fare zone 3 and very close to Hither Green Traction Maintenance Depot (TMD), Grove Park Traction and Rolling Stock Maintenance Depot, and Grove Park Safety Training Centre. The station straddles the Prime Meridian, which is marked across the roof of the pedestrian tunnel forming the main entrance.

The station and all trains are operated by Southeastern.

== History ==
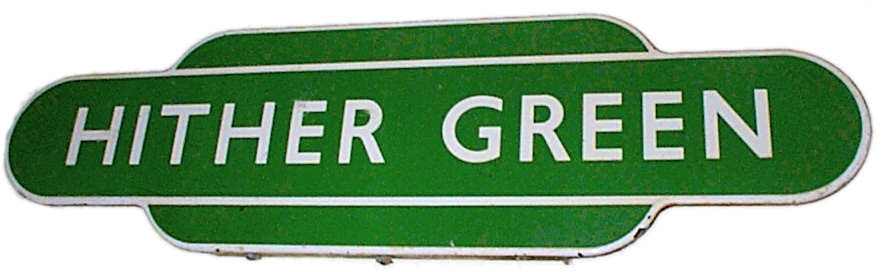
Station signage in use by British Railways Southern Region

Hither Green station was opened on 1 June 1895, by the South Eastern Railway (SER). It was built at Hither Green junction which had been formed some thirty years earlier. Originally there was a booking hall in Springbank Road which was built to serve the St. Germans Estate. The red brick gateposts are still visible outside the site, which was occupied by a timber merchant for many years, but is now being redeveloped for residential use. The original stationmaster's house survives, at 69 Springbank Road. The main station building was built in Staplehurst Road. Since 1974, access to the new booking hall, located between platforms 4 and 5, has been up a ramp from a foot tunnel which runs between Staplehurst Road and Maythorne Cottages.

In 1899 the SER entered a working relationship known as the South Eastern and Chatham Railway, which managed the station until 1 January 1923, when it became part of the Southern Railway. The Southern Region of British Rail was responsible from nationalisation in 1948 until the regions were completely abolished at the end of 1992.

== Accidents and incidents ==
- On 4 September 1934, two freight trains collided at Hither Green.
- On 5 November 1967, the Hither Green rail crash occurred. An express train from Hastings to Charing Cross derailed between Grove Park and Hither Green station, close to where the railway crosses St. Mildred's Road, due to a broken rail. Forty-nine passengers were killed. Robin Gibb of the Bee Gees and his then-fiancée Molly Hullis were among the survivors. Gibb would express the emotions he experienced during the accident in the song Really and Sincerely featured on the group's 1968 album Horizontal.

== Facilities and exits ==
There are two exits from Hither Green Station: Fernbrook Road and Springbank Road. The Fernbrook Road exit may be used to reach Hither Green village. There is also a passageway leading out to Maythorne Cottages, which links with Nightingale Grove. The Springbank Road exit may be used for roads to the west of the station including Hither Green Lane. The exit towards the south east end of platform 4 is an exit for authorised personnel only via Hither Green Traction Maintenance Depot (TMD).

While the station has a ticket office, it is not open at all times. Ticket machines are available at all times at the Fernbrook Road exit, between platforms 4 and 5, and – for the Springbank Road exit – halfway along on platform 1. There is a coffee shop on platform 5, and a newsagent near the main ticket office, but again these are not open at all times. The station has toilets (open only when the station is staffed). A popular specialty coffee tuk tuk has recently opened at the staplehurst road entrance. Bolla Bolla has been operating since September 2024 and serves specialty coffee, pastries and iced drinks.

Planning permission has been granted for a new footbridge and lifts to be installed providing step-free access, and construction work started in early 2025.. The bridge was craned into place in May 2026. The £28m upgrade programme also includes installing four 16-person lifts, staircases and a passageway between platform 4 and 5. Once completed, the station will have step-free access from street level to the footbridge and across all the platforms.

== Services ==
All services at Hither Green are operated by Southeastern using Class 376, 465, 466 and 707 EMUs.

The typical off-peak service in trains per hour is:

- 6 tph to London Charing Cross (2 of these run non-stop to London Bridge and the other 4 call at Lewisham)
- 2 tph to London Cannon Street (all stations except Lewisham)
- 4 tph to Dartford via Sidcup of which 2 continue to Gravesend
- 4 tph to Orpington via Grove Park of which 2 continue to Sevenoaks

During the peak hours, the station is served by an additional half-hourly circular service to and from London Cannon Street via Lewisham in the clockwise direction and Sidcup, Woolwich Arsenal and Greenwich in the anticlockwise direction.

The station is also served by a single early morning service to London Blackfriars.

Preceding station	National Rail	Following station
Lewisham or London Bridge	Southeastern Dartford Loop Line	Lee
Lewisham or London Bridge	Southeastern Grove Park Line	Grove Park

== Freight yards and motive power depot ==
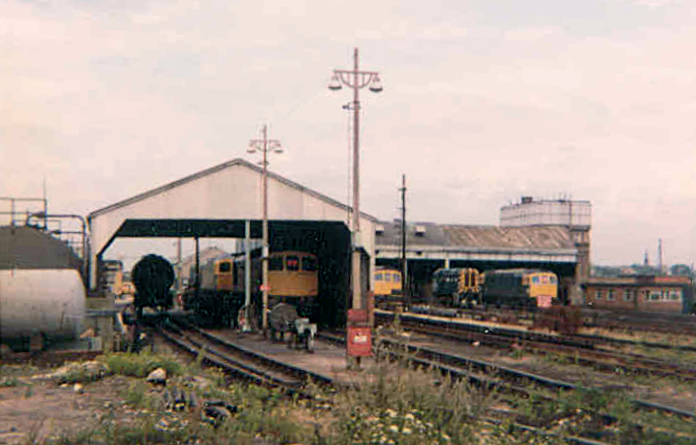
Hither Green TMD in August 1980. Engines present include Class 33 locos and Class 08 shunters

The nearby freight yard is an important strategic location for cross-London freight trains. A former motive power depot opened by the Southern Railway in 1933 was closed in 1961 and converted to the Hither Green Traction Maintenance Depot.

== Connections ==
London Buses route 273, London Buses route 225 and London Buses route N171 serve the station.
