= Segrate railway station =

Italian railway station on the Milan–Venice railway

Segrate
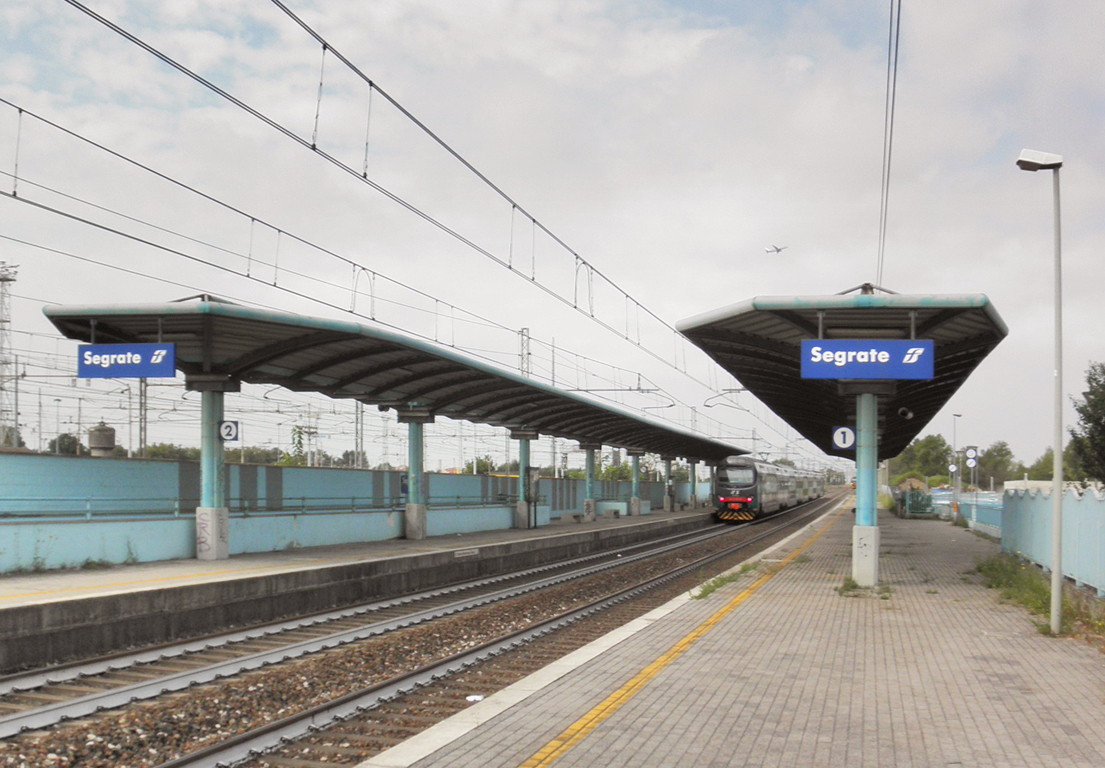

General information
- Location: Via Cima 50, Segrate; Italy
- Coordinates: 45°28′51″N 9°17′55″E
- Owner: Rete Ferroviaria Italiana
- Operator: Trenord
- Line: Milan–Venice
- Distance: 9.907 km (6.156 mi) from Milan Central
- Platforms: 2
- Tracks: 2

Other information
- Fare zone: STIBM: Mi3

History
- Opened: 12 December 2002

Services
| Preceding station | Trenord | Following station |
|---|---|---|
| Milano Forlanini towards Varese | Line S5 (Milan suburban railway service) | Pioltello–Limito towards Treviglio |
| Milano Forlanini towards Novara | Line S6 (Milan suburban railway service) | Pioltello–Limito towards Treviglio |
Location
- Location within Lombardy Location within Northern Italy Location within Italy

Segrate is a railway station in Italy. Located on the Milan–Venice railway, it serves the town of Segrate.

== Services ==
Segrate is served by lines S5 and S6 of the Milan suburban railway network, operated by the Lombard railway company Trenord.

== See also ==
- Milan suburban railway network
