= Giovanni Invernizzi =

Giovanni Invernizzi may refer to:

- Giovanni Invernizzi (footballer, born 1931) (1931–2005), Italian international football player, later Internazionale Milan manager
- Giovanni Invernizzi (footballer, born 1963), Italian football player and coach
- Giovanni Invernizzi (rower) (1926–1986), Italian Olympic champion rower
