= Marcia A. Invernizzi =

American professor, author and researcher

Marcia Invernizzi is an American professor, author, and researcher in the field of reading education. At the University of Virginia School of Education and Human Development (formerly the Curry School of Education), she teaches reading education. As founder of the Book Buddies program, she is known as a leader in early literacy intervention.

== Education ==
Invernizzi graduated from Washington College in 1972 with a B.A. in English. She then taught English and reading in various schools in Virginia and Maryland. During that time, she earned her M.Ed. in reading education from the University of Virginia. In 1985 she earned her PhD in reading education, also from the University of Virginia.

== Career ==
Invernizzi became an assistant professor at the University of Virginia in 1985. She became an associate professor in 1993 and then a full professor in 2001. Invernizzi was awarded the Thomas G. Jewell professorship in 2002 and the Henderson professorship in 2004.

Invernizzi was the Henderson Professor of Reading Education at the University of Virginia's School of Education and Human Development. She teaches in the department of Curriculum, Instruction, and Special Education. Invernizzi has been the director of the McGuffey Reading Center since 1990. She is co-creator of the Phonological Awareness Literacy Screening (PALS) tool used in the state of Virginia for assessing students' literacy skills.

At Washington College's annual George Washington's birthday convocation on February 25, 2011, Invernizzi was awarded an honorary degree, Doctor of Letters.

In 2013, U.VA. Innovations named Invernizzi as their Innovator of the Year. She is the first from the School of Education and Human Development to receive this honor.

== Research and contributions ==
=== Literacy assessment ===
Invernizzi co-created the Phonological Awareness Literacy Screening (PALS) tool. PALS is provided by the state of Virginia for their schools' use. This tool is designed to measure specific components of literacy (phonological awareness, alphabet knowledge, knowledge of letter sounds, spelling, concept of word, word recognition in isolation, and oral passage reading) to identify struggling readers in order to provide interventions as early as possible. While this tool is considered reliable, and having good construct, concurrent, and predictive validity, educators should consider data from a variety of sources when making high-stakes decisions. The results may also be used in the Response to Intervention (RtI) process.

=== Literacy instruction ===
The Words Their Way series of instructional resources for literacy educators was co-authored by Donald R. Bear, Invernizzi, Shane Templeton, and Francine Johnston. The books provide screening tools to assess students' skills in various areas of literacy. It provides lessons teachers can use based on the assessment to specifically address areas of weakness and move students forward in the development. Companion websites, reproducibles, and materials on CD-ROM are useful resources for educators. Special attention to addressing the special needs of English language learners (ELL) are incorporated as well. Some of the books in the series are specifically designed for ELL students.

=== Reading interventions ===
Book Buddies is a program for providing one-on-one reading interventions for struggling elementary school students. Recognizing the positive effects of individualized instruction and the fiscal limitations for schools to provide this, Dr. Invernizzi set out to devise a program that would benefit students without burdening the schools. In the Book Buddies program, volunteers receive training and follow the lessons that are provided.

In Talking Tutoring, a four-part series of webcasts produced by WETA/Reading Rockets, a panel of experts including Invernizzi, Carole Prest, and Ann Hoover, discuss struggling readers, the need for tutors, various tutoring models and the effect of tutors on reading success. Inversizzi refers to the National Assessment of Educational Progress (NAEP) report indicating American students are in need of intervention. The panel discusses reading research, various models of tutoring from small group to one-on-one, tutoring training, and responds to audience questions.

== Publications ==
Selected publications (refereed)

- Invernizzi, M. (2009). Virginia's Early Intervention Reading Initiative (EIRI) and Response to Intervention (RtI). Reading in Virginia.
- Zucker, T. A., & Invernizzi, M.A. (2008). My eSorts and digital extensions of word study. The Reading Teacher, 61, 8, 654–658.
- Picard, M., & Invernizzi, M. (2007). Rebuttal to Roger A. Stewart's 2005 Book Review. Journal of Literacy Research, 39, 2, 277–280.
- Booker, K., Invernizzi, M., & McCormick, M. (2007). Kiss Your Brain. Reading Research and Instruction, 46, 4, 315–340.
- Warley, H., Landrum, T., Invernizzi, M., & Justice, L. (2005). Prediction of first grade reading achievement. National Reading Conference Yearbook.
- Invernizzi, M., Landrum, T., Howell, J., & Partridge, H. (2005). Toward a peaceful coexistence of test developers, policy makers, and teachers in an era of accountability. The Reading Teacher, 58, 7, 610–618.
- Invernizzi, M., Landrum, T.J., Teichman, A., & Townsend, M. (2010). Increased implementation of emergent literacy screening in pre-kindergarten. Early Childhood Education Journal, 37(6), 437–446.
- Invernizzi, M., Justice, L.M., Landrum, T., & Booker, K. (2005). Early literacy screening in kindergarten: Widespread implementation in *Virginia. Journal of Literacy Research, 36,4,479–500.
- Justice, L.M., Invernizzi, M., & Geller, K., Sullivan, A.K., Welsch, J. (2005). Descriptive-Developmental performance of at-risk preschoolers in early literacy. Reading Psychology.
- Walpole, S., Justice, L. & Invernizzi, M. I. (2004). Closing the gap between research and practice: Case study of school-wide literacy reform. Reading and Writing Research Quarterly, 20, 3, 261–283.
- Howell, J.L., Partridge, H.A., Landrum, T.L., & Invernizzi, M. (2004). A look back on seven years of PALS and Virginia's EIRI. Reading in Virginia: The Journal of the Virginia State Reading Association.
- Partridge, H., Invernizzi, M., Meier, J. & Sullivan, A. (2004). Linking assessment and instruction via web-based technology: A case-study of a statewide early literacy initiative. Reading On-Line, www.readingonline.org.
- Invernizzi, M. & Hayes, L. (2004). Developmental-spelling research: A systematic imperative. Reading Research Quarterly, 39, 2, 216–228.
- Justice, L., Invernizzi, M., & Meier, J. (April 2002). Designing and implementing an early literacy screening protocol: Suggestions for the speech-language pathologist. Journal of Language, Hearing and Speech Service. 33(2), 84–101.
- Meier, J. & Invernizzi, M. (2001). Book buddies in the Bronx: Testing a model for America Reads and National Service. Journal for the Education Placement of Students Placed At-Risk. 6(4), 319–333.
- Abouzeid, M., Invernizzi, M., Bear, D., & Ganske, K. (2000). Approaching phonics through spelling. The California Reader, the literacy journal of the California State Literacy Association, 33, (4), 21–28.
- Invernizzi, M., Rosemary, C. Juel, C., & Richards, H. (1997). At-risk readers and community volunteers: A three-year perspective. Scientific Studies of Reading: The official journal of the society for the scientific study of reading, 1 (3), 277–300.
- Invernizzi, M., Abouzeid, M., & Bloodgood, J. (1997). Integrated word study: Spelling, grammar, & meaning in the language arts classroom. Language Arts, 74 (3), 185–192.
- Invernizzi, M., Juel, C., & Rosemary, C. (1996). A community volunteer tutorial that works. The Reading Teacher, 50, (4), 304–311.
- Worthy, J. & Invernizzi, M., (1996). Hyperlexia: A case study in the search for meaning. Journal of Reading Behavior, 27, (4), 585–603.
- Invernizzi, M., & Abouzeid, M. (1995). One story map may not fit all: A cross-cultural analysis of children's written story retellings. Journal of Narrative and Life History, 5, (5), 1–14.
- Invernizzi, M., Abouzeid, M., & Gill, T. (1994). Using students' invented spelling as a guide for spelling instruction that emphasizes word study. The Elementary School Journal, 95, (2), 155–167.

Selected Publications (Invited):

- Hansen, J. & Invernizzi, M. (2003). The teaching of reading. In J. W. Guthrie, (Editor in Chief). The Encyclopedia of Education. 2nd edition. NY: MacMillan Reference.
- Invernizzi, M. (2000). Quality volunteer reading programs. Issue paper for the National Governors' Association, Center for Best Practices.
- Invernizzi, M. & Meier, J. (1999). PALS and Virginia's early intervention reading initiative. Reading in Virginia: The literacy journal of the Virginia State Reading Association, 26–32.

Selected Book Chapters

- Invernizzi, M. & Hayes, L. (2009). Word recognition. In D. Allington & A. McGill-Franzen (Eds.), Handbook of Reading Disabilities. Newark, DE: International Reading Association.
- Invernizzi, M., Landrum, T., Howell, J., & Partridge, H. (2007). Toward a peaceful coexistence of test developers, policy makers, and teachers in an era of accountability. In R.D. Robinson & M.C. McKenna (Eds), Issues and Trends in Literacy Education (4th edition). Boston: Allyn & Bacon.
- Invernizzi, M. (2003). Concepts, sound, and the ABCs: A diet for a very young reader. In D.M. Barone & L.M. Morrow (Eds.). Literacy and young children: Research-based practices. New York: The Guilford Press.
- Invernizzi, M. (2001). The complex world of one-on-one tutorials. To appear in S. Neuman & D. Dickinson (Eds.), Handbook of research in early literacy for the 21st century. New York: Guilford Press, 193–214.
- Invernizzi, M. (2000). Book buddies: A community volunteer tutorial. In L. Morrow & D.G. Woo (Eds.), Tutoring programs for struggling readers: The America reads challenge. New York: Guilford Press.
- Invernizzi, M., Juel, C. & Rosemary, C. (1998). A community volunteer tutorial that works. In R. Allington (Ed.), Teaching Struggling Readers. Newark: IRA Press, 276–285.
- Invernizzi, M. (1992). The vowel and what follows: a phonological frame of orthographic analysis. In S. Templeton and D. Bear (Eds.), The Development of Orthographic Knowledge:Foundations of Literacy (pp. 105–136). New York: Erlbaum

== Honors ==
- Innovator of the Year, U.Va. Innovation, 2013
- Honorary degree, Doctor of Letters from her alma mater, Washington College, 2011
- Top 100 Innovations from Academic Research to Real-World Applications, 2008
- Curry School of Education Outstanding Professor Award, 2006
- The Washington College Alumni Citation for Excellence, 2005
- The Henderson Professorship, 2004
- The Samuel B. Miller Award for Community Service, 2004
- Thomas G. Jewell Professorship, 2002–2004.
- The WVTF Public Service Award, September 1999.
- The Daily Progress Distinguished Dozen Award, Charlottesville, Virginia, 1998
- The Virginia State Reading Association's Literacy Award, 1997.
