= Vignate =

Vignate Vignaa (Lombard)
- Comune
- Comune di Vignate
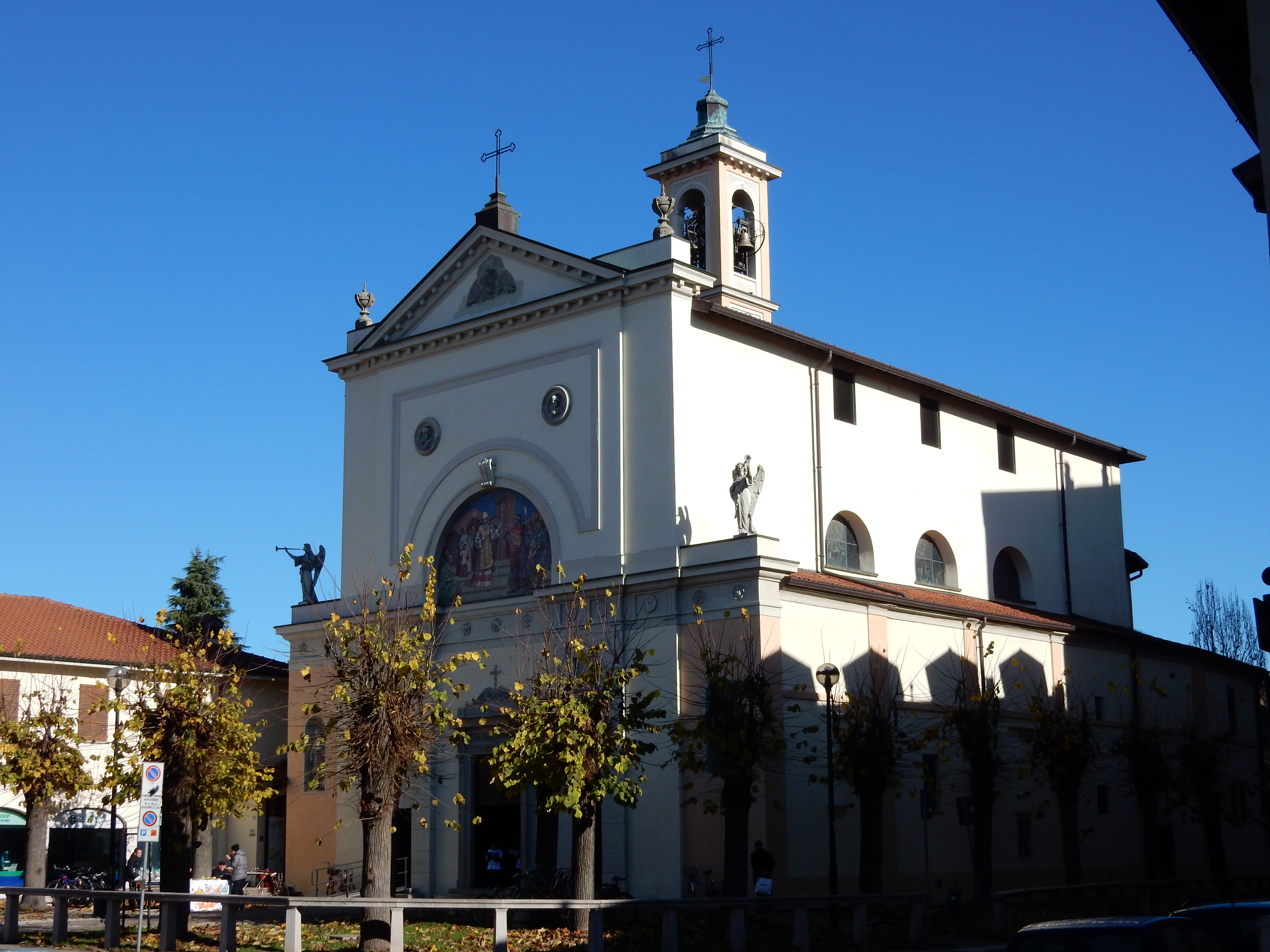

- Coat of arms

- Location within Italy Location within Lombardy
- Coordinates: 45°30′N 9°22′E
- Country: Italy
- Region: Lombardy
- Metropolitan city: Milan (MI)

Government
  - Mayor: Paolo Gobbi

Area
  - Total: 8.55 km^{2} (3.30 sq mi)
- Elevation: 121 m (397 ft)

Population (31 December 2015)
  - Total: 9,310
  - Density: 1,090/km^{2} (2,820/sq mi)
- Demonym: Vignatesi
- Time zone: UTC+1 (CET)
  - Summer (DST): UTC+2 (CEST)
- Postal code: 20060
- Dialing code: 02
- Website: Official website

Vignate (Lombard: Vignaa [ʋiˈɲaː]) is a comune (municipality) in the Metropolitan City of Milan in the Italian region Lombardy, located about 15 kilometres (9 mi) east of Milan.

Vignate borders the following municipalities: Cernusco sul Naviglio, Cassina de' Pecchi, Melzo, Rodano, Liscate, and Settala.

It is served by Vignate railway station.

== Twin towns ==
Vignate is twinned with:

- Gières, France, since 1984
