= Hither Green rail crash =

1967 train derailment in London, England

Coordinates: 51°26′43″N 0°00′20″E

Details
- Date: 5 November 1967; 21:16
- Location: Hither Green Depot
- Country: England
- Line: South Eastern Main Line (BR Southern Region)
- Cause: Broken rail

Statistics
- Trains: 1
- Passengers: full train, some standing passengers
- Deaths: 49
- Injured: 78

On 5 November 1967, a busy Sunday evening train service from Hastings to London Charing Cross derailed near the Hither Green maintenance depot in London, between Hither Green and Grove Park railway stations. Of the twelve coaches, many full of standing passengers, eleven were derailed and four turned onto their sides, resulting in 49 fatalities and 78 injuries. It is Britain's sixth worst rail disaster in terms of death toll.

The derailment was found to be due to a broken rail. The Ministry of Transport report criticised the maintenance of the line, especially following a recent increase of the maximum speed of trains over the route. Following the accident the maintenance of the line was improved and plans accelerated for replacing jointed track by continuous welded rail.

== Derailment ==
On Sunday 5 November 1967 the 19:43 Hastings to Charing Cross service, consisting of twelve coaches formed by two six-car diesel-electric multiple units – 1007 (a 6S) leading 1017 (a 6L) – and travelling at approximately 70 miles per hour (110 km/h), derailed at 21:16 shortly before the St Mildred's Road railway bridge, near Hither Green maintenance depot. The leading pair of wheels of the third coach was derailed by a broken rail and ran on for a quarter of a mile (400 m) before hitting points, causing eleven coaches to be derailed and four of those to turn onto their sides. The train came to rest in 250 yards (230 m), except for the leading coach that detached and ran on a further 220 yards (200 m).

It was a busy Sunday evening and there were passengers standing in the train. Forty-nine passengers were killed and 78 injured, 27 being detained in hospital. Most of the casualties had been travelling in the overturned coaches. The victims included James Gordon Melville Turner and Hugh Whittard, son of Walter Whittard international retailer of fine teas. Amongst the survivors were singer Robin Gibb of the Bee Gees and his wife-to-be Molly Hullis.

== Aftermath ==
The emergency services arrived within five minutes and the first casualty arrived at hospital 18 minutes after the derailment. The last survivor was taken to hospital at 01:00 the following morning. Local residents, The Salvation Army and Women's Voluntary Service assisted the injured and shocked.

The fast lines were blocked by the derailment and the traction current to the slow lines was turned off to allow the rescue. Traction current was temporarily restored to the slow lines for the Tuesday morning rush hour and returned to traffic at 15:40 that afternoon. The fast lines were reopened with a speed restriction at 06:20 Wednesday morning.

== Inquiry and report ==
The derailment was found to be due to a broken rail at a rail joint, where a fatigue crack through the first bolt hole in a running-on rail had progressively developed and a triangular piece of rail had broken out. The sleeper at the joint had previously failed and been replaced with a shallower timber replacement. This replacement had not been well packed, was on a shallow layer of clean ballast and the rubber pad supporting the rail on the adjacent concrete sleeper was missing.

After the derailment, passengers commented about trains running at excessive speed, but British Rail routinely monitored this and the number of trains running in excess of the permitted speed was small and normally only by a small amount. Complaints were also received about the rough riding of Hastings line stock and another train of the same class was tested on Southern Region and Eastern Region track. Although the ride quality was better on the Eastern region track, it was not considered dangerous on Southern Region track.

The speed limit for electric multiple units on the track had been raised from 75 mph (121 km/h) to 90 mph (140 km/h) in July 1967. After the derailment the line was inspected and a temporary speed restriction of 60 mph (97 km/h) imposed. The report found that Civil Engineering and Inspection Departments had permitted too low a standard of maintenance on the line and had failed to assess the implications of increasing the speed of the trains.

== Legacy ==
Maintenance of the line was improved, inspection techniques and jointing methods were revised, and plans for replacing jointed track by continuous welded rail were accelerated. Concrete sleepers were banned at rail joints on the Southern Region.

A plaque in Hither Green station commemorates the victims. Station staff and loved ones laid wreaths and flowers at the plaque on the anniversary of the disaster.

== See also ==
- Edward Ashmore § Family
- Pioltello train derailment, also caused by a broken rail at a track joint
