= Hither Green TMD =

Railway depot in south-east London, England

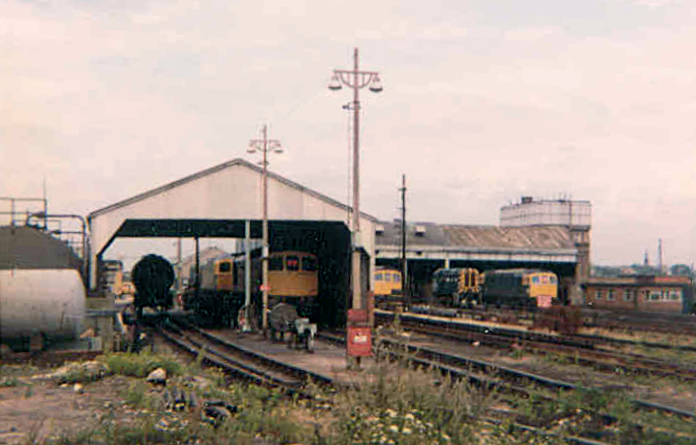
- Hither Green TMD in August 1980. Engines present include Class 33 locos and Class 08 shunters.
- Interactive map of Hither Green TMD

Location
- Location: Lewisham, United Kingdom
- Coordinates: 51.450°N 0.003°E

Characteristics
- Owner: DB Schenker
- Depot code: HG (1973-)
- Type: Diesel

History
- Opened: 10 September 1933; 92 years ago
- Original: Southern Railway
- Post-grouping: Southern Railway
- BR region: Southern Region
- Former depot code: 73C (1948-1973)

Hither Green (London) Traction Maintenance Depot or Hither Green (London) TMD is a railway depot used for the maintenance and servicing of freight trains adjacent to the Hither Green marshalling yard. The depot is a hub for moving freight around south-east England; it is owned and operated by DBS. The official depot code is HG; in steam days, the shed code was 73C.

The depot is situated south of Lewisham, to the south-east of Hither Green station; it is sited between this station and Lee on the Sidcup line, and Grove Park on the Orpington line.

== Motive power depot ==
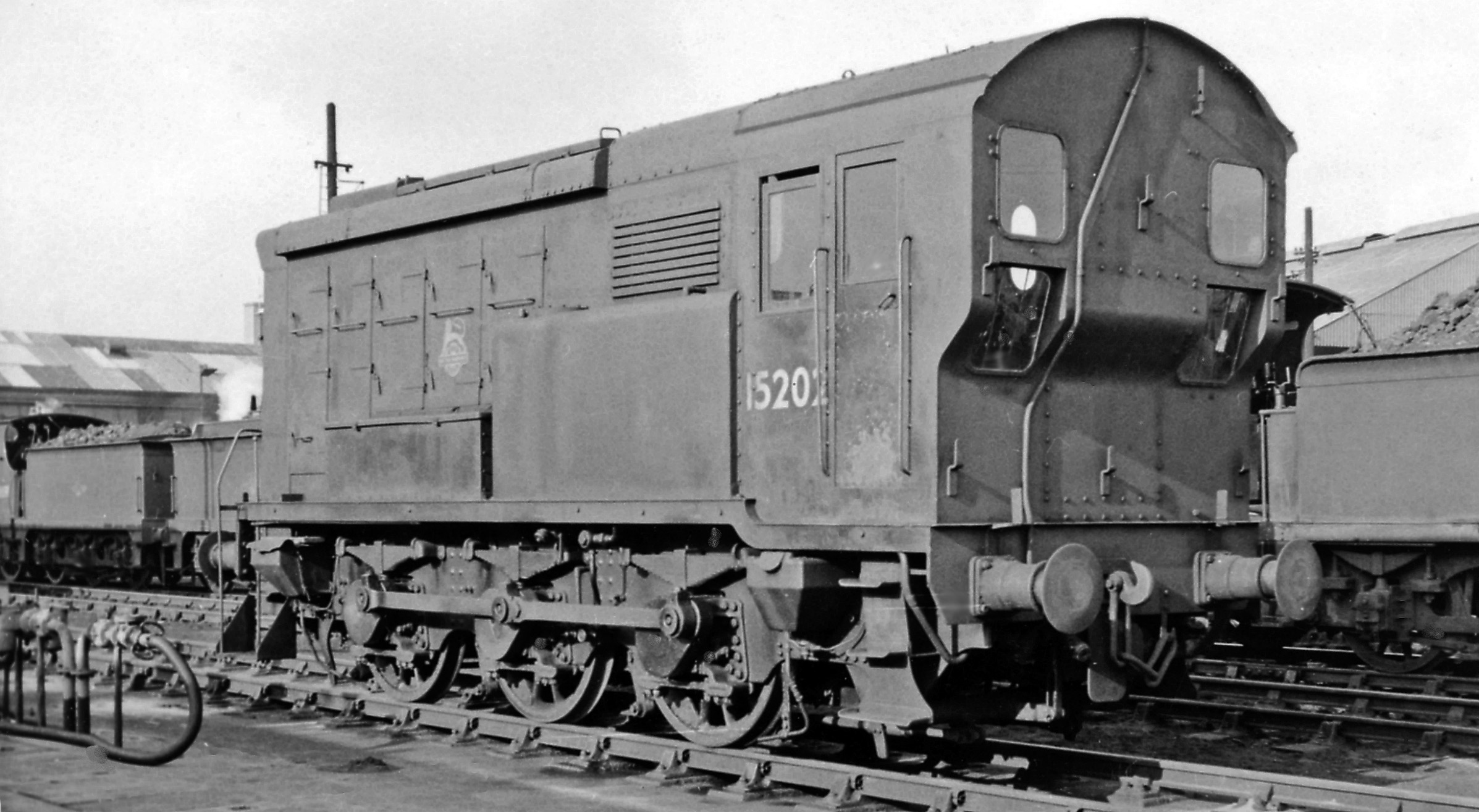
SR 0-6-0 Diesel-electric shunter no. 15202 at Hither Green Locomotive Depot 12 March 1960

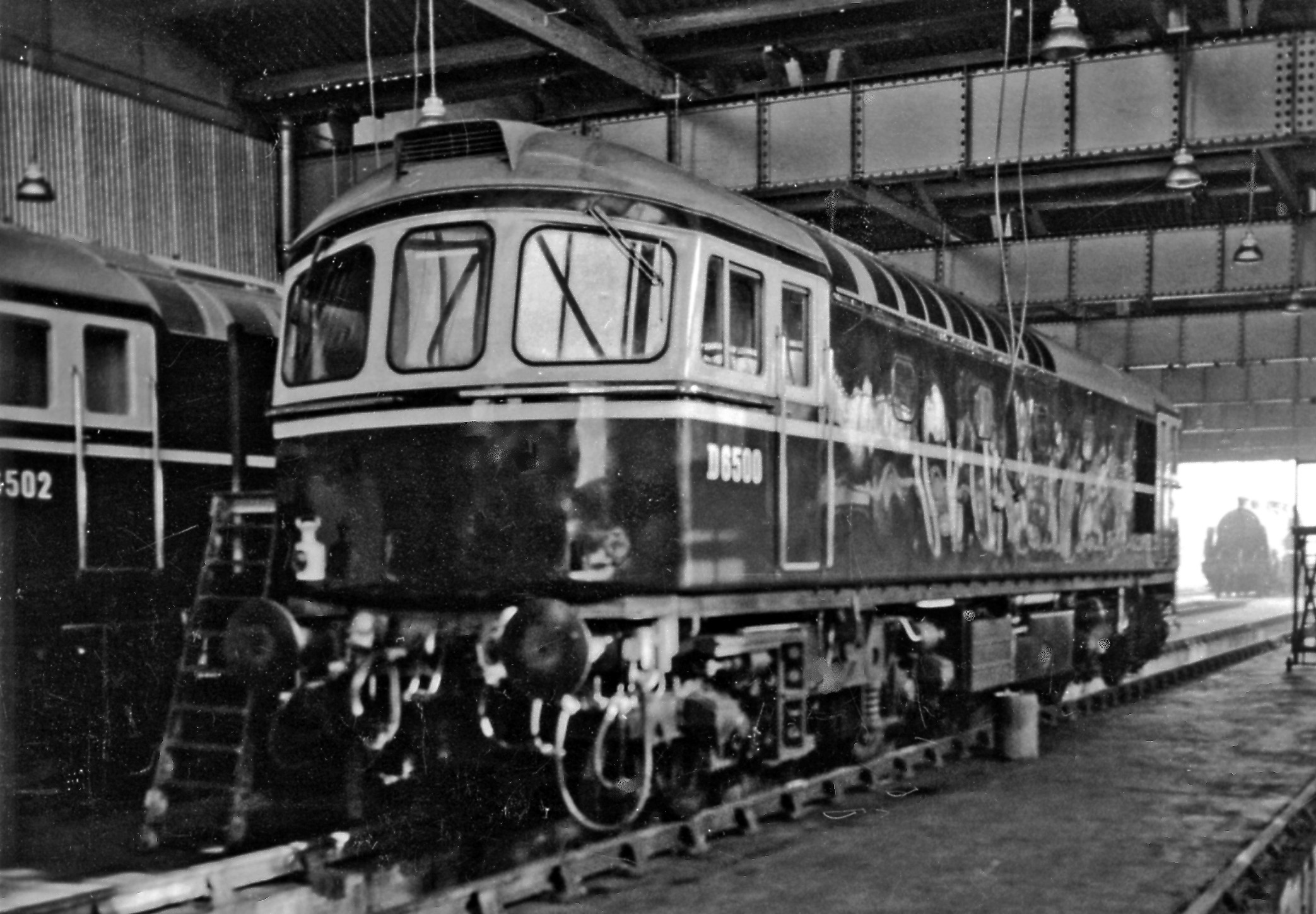
A brand-new Type 3 diesel no. D6500 at Hither Green Shed, 12 March 1960

A modern concrete-fabricated motive power depot was opened by the Southern Railway on 10 September 1933 to service its new marshalling yard at Hither Green. Facilities included a coal stage line and a turntable. It was principally a freight depot with responsibility for cross-London freights; it received a batch of SR W class 2-6-4 tank engines for this purpose.

During the 1950s, the depot also began to acquire a number of diesel shunters of Classes 08 and 09. It ceased to service steam locomotives in October 1961, but the buildings continued in use to service diesel locomotives.

== Traction maintenance depot ==
The buildings became a traction maintenance depot. Half of the original engine shed was demolished in 1993, but the remains were modernised with the original locomotive turntable still in place.

In 1982, the depot became part of Railfreight; it became part of English Welsh & Scottish Railway (EWS) in February 1996. The former British Rail Civil Mechanical & Electrical Engineering department (CM&EE), which had been based here since 1991, became part of Balfour Beatty. A new structure for housing Balfour Beatty's maintenance stock was opened in December 1997.

=== Allocation ===
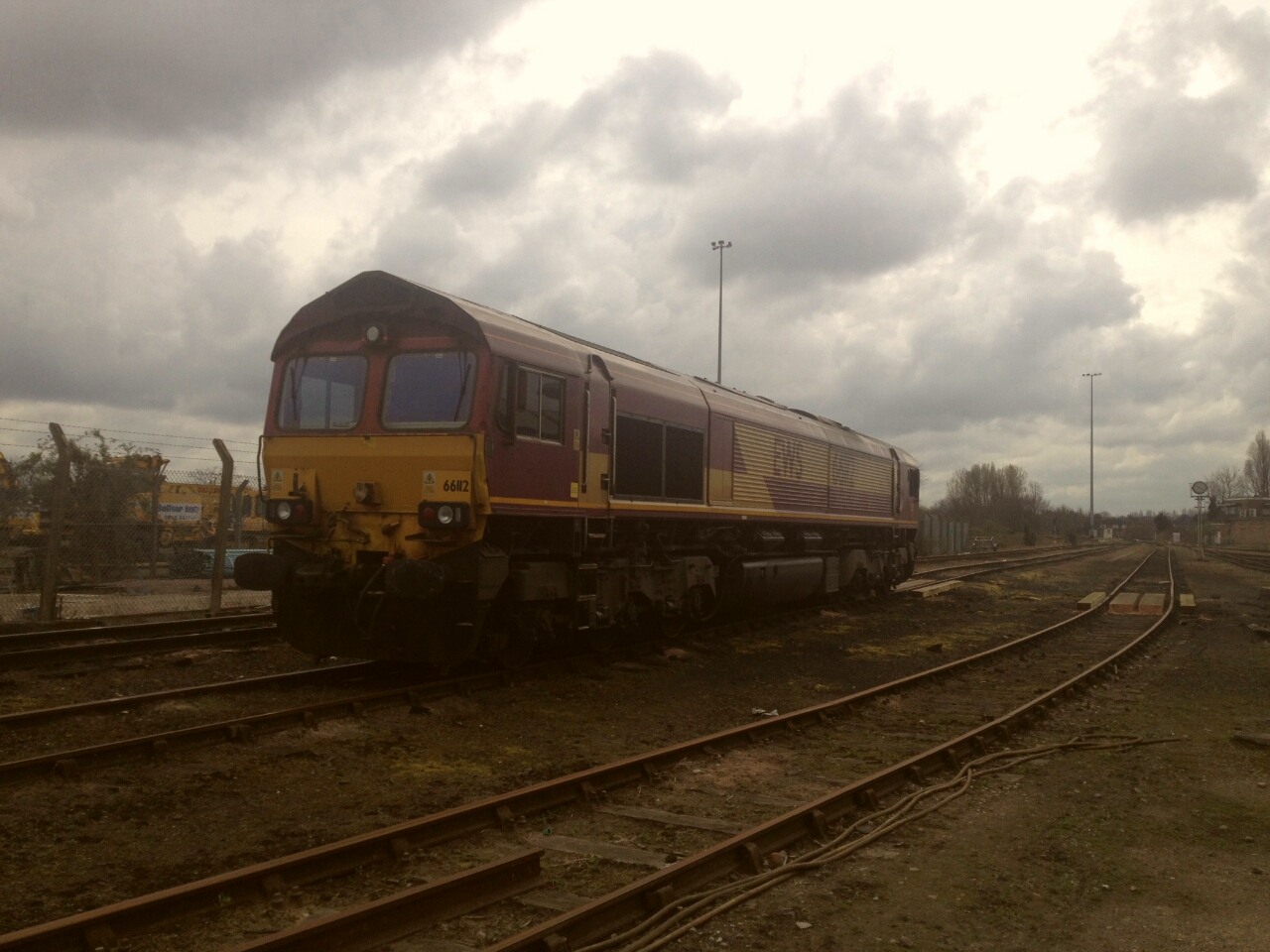
A Class 66 locomotive on shed in 2014

Between 1959 and 1962, 98 Type 3 British Rail Class 33s were allocated to the depot. Many of these were subsequently transferred to Eastleigh TMD but, in 1979, 45 members of the class still remained. In 1980, the depot had an allocation of 42 Class 33s, five Class 08s and four Class 09s. Class 33 began to be phased out in 1990 and was completely withdrawn by 1998, when the depot lost its permanent locomotive allocation.

Frequent visitors to the depot during the 1970s and 1980s were Class 73 electro-diesels, Class 47 and Class 56, together with occasional visits by Class 25, Class 31 and Class 37 diesels. Some Class 31s were displaced from Toton TMD and transferred temporarily to Hither Green to work engineers' trains, but these were withdrawn in 2001. Likewise Class 58s were transferred in 2001 until their withdrawal on 2 September 2002.

Regularly seen at Hither Green TMD are:

- Class 59 diesel locomotives:
  - Subclass 59/0 owned by Foster Yeoman and operated by Mendip Rail (numbered 59001/2/4/5).
  - Subclass 59/1 owned by Hanson plc and operated by Mendip Rail (numbered 59101-59104).
  - Subclass 59/2 owned and operated by DBS (numbered 59201-59206).
- Class 66 diesel locomotives owned and operated by DBS (numbered 66001-66250).
- The Structure Gauging Train, top and tailed by various locomotives and DVTs.

Also nearby is Grove Park Depot and Sidings, operated by Southeastern Trains; this provides train crew and stabling for some of their electric multiple unit fleet. Located next to the up sidings is Grove Park Safety Training Centre, which can be accessed from Brownhill Road (A205 South Circular) in Catford.

The Hither Green derailment happened just outside Hither Green TMD on the railway line between Hither Green and Grove Park stations. The drivers and locomotive involved in the Eltham (Well Hall) derailment were allocated from Hither Green TMD.
