= Rodano =

- Comune
- Comune di Rodano
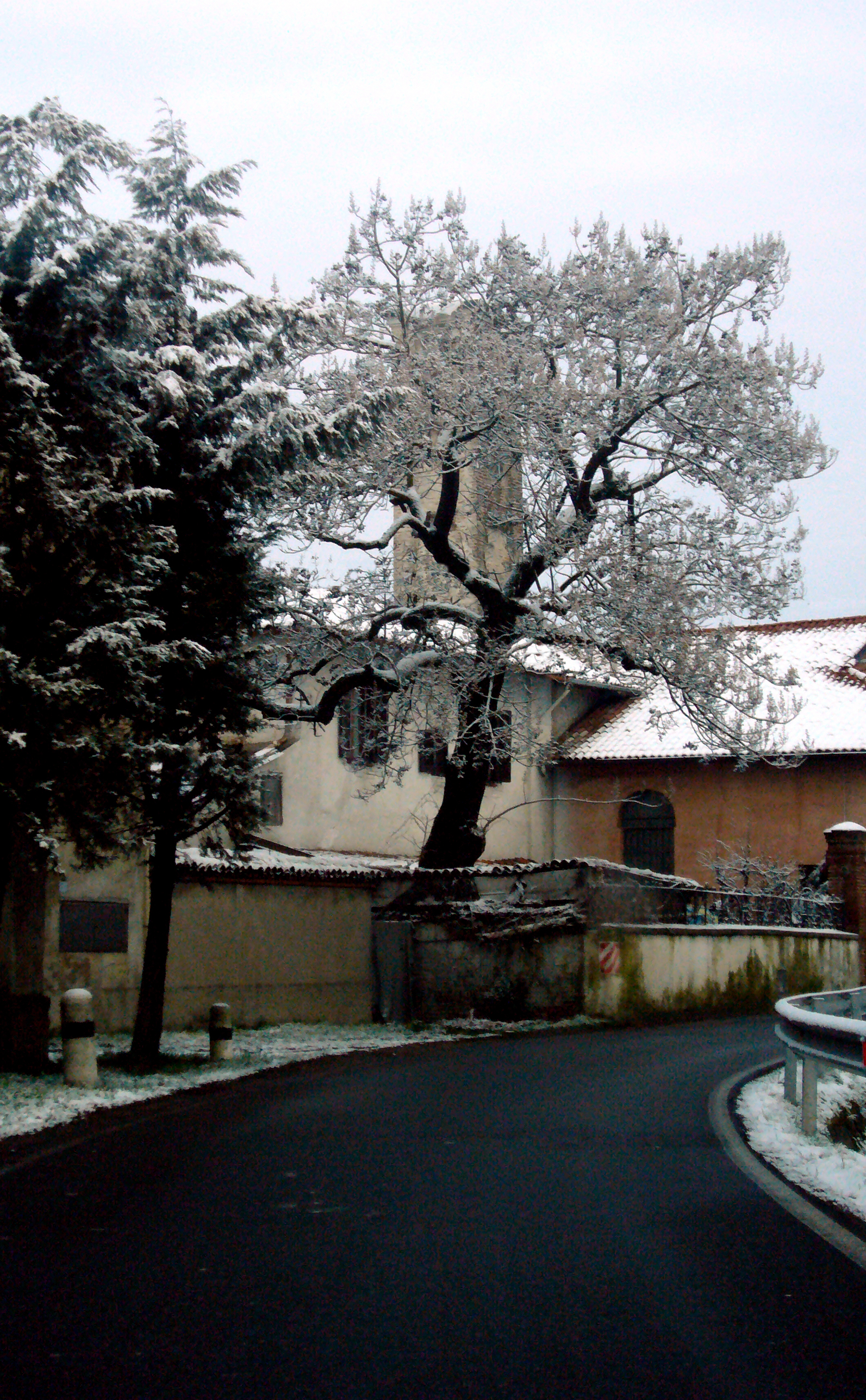
- Cassignanica

- Coat of arms

- Location within Italy Location within Lombardy
- Coordinates: 45°29′N 9°21′E
- Country: Italy
- Region: Lombardy
- Metropolitan city: Milan (MI)
- Frazioni: (Rodano), Lucino, Millepini, Cassignanica, Pobbiano, Trenzanesio

Government
  - Mayor: Danilo Mauro Bruschi

Area
  - Total: 13.07 km^{2} (5.05 sq mi)
- Elevation: 120 m (390 ft)

Population (31 December 2017)
  - Total: 4,631
  - Density: 354.3/km^{2} (917.7/sq mi)
- Demonym: Rodanesi
- Time zone: UTC+1 (CET)
  - Summer (DST): UTC+2 (CEST)
- Postal code: 20090
- Dialing code: 02
- Saint day: Cassignanica: 2nd Sunday in September; Lucino: First Sunday in September; Millepini: last Sunday in May
- Website: Official website

Rodano (Lombard: Roeudin [ˈrøːdĩ]) is a city and comune in the Metropolitan City of Milan, Lombardy, northern Italy.

== Geography ==
The territory of Rodano, 13 kilometres (8 mi) east of Milan, is part of the Parco Agricolo Sud Milano and has large areas committed to agriculture. The several spring pools that are still active are very important to the city and represent a typical feature of the Pianura Padana. The Muzzetta Springs, a WWF protected area, are an example of beautiful reserve and can be visited upon request.

== Main sights ==
Sights include the Lombard graves on display in front of the City Hall and Europe's finest Scooter and Lambretta Museum, which offers a range of mopeds and scooters dating back to the beginning of the 20th century and the full historical archive of Innocenti, makers of the Lambretta.

== People ==
- Thema (1972), singer
