= Province of Milan =

Former province of Lombardy, Italy

Coordinates: 45°27′50.98″N 9°11′25.21″E

- Province (1786–2014)
- Flag Coat of arms

- Map highlighting the location of the former province of Milan in Italy
- Country: Italy
- Region: Lombardy
- Established: 26 September 1786
- Abolished: 31 December 2014
- Capital(s): Milan
- Comuni: 134

Area
  - Total: 1,575 km^{2} (608 sq mi)

Population (03-31-2012)
  - Total: 3,195,211
  - Density: 2,029/km^{2} (5,254/sq mi)
- Time zone: UTC+1 (CET)
  - Summer (DST): UTC+2 (CEST)
- Vehicle registration: MI
- ISTAT: 015

The province of Milan (Italian: provincia di Milano) was a province in the Lombardy region of Italy. Its capital was the city of Milan. The area of the former province is highly urbanized, with more than 2,000 inhabitants/km^{2}, the third-highest population density among Italian provinces, just below the densities of the provinces of Naples and of Monza e Brianza, the latter of which was created in 2004 from the north-eastern part of the province of Milan. On 1 January 2015, the province was replaced by the Metropolitan City of Milan.

== Geography ==
The province of Milan extended over the Po Valley and was bordered by the River Ticino to the west, and the River Adda to the east. It was shaped by its waterways – river and canals that traverse it and sometimes border it, from the Lambro and Olona rivers to the numerous canals, like the Navigli Milanesi; these water runs link farmsteads and villages like Corneliano Bertario, the Castello Borromeo and ancient noble villas (such as the Inzago Villa near the Naviglio Martesana) to the Canale Villoresi, which is thought to be the longest man-made canal in Italy. The Villoresi is the natural southern border of Brianza, an area in Lombardy noted for its mountains, lakes and plains.

It contains six regional natural parks: Parco Adda Nord, Parco Agricolo Sud Milano, Parco delle Groane, Parco Nord Milano, Parco della Valle del Lambro and the Parco Lombardo della Valle del Ticino. Half of the province is agricultural and flood plain, and most of it is protected by reserves.

== Largest municipalities by population ==
Rank	City	Population	Area (km^{2})	Density (inhabitants/km^{2})	Altitude (mslm)
1st	Milan	1336879	181.76	7355.2	122
2nd	Sesto San Giovanni	81750	11.74	6963.4	140
3rd	Cinisello Balsamo	74536	12.7	5869	154
4th	Legnano	59492	17.72	3357.3	199
5th	Rho	51033	22.32	2286.4	158
6th	Cologno Monzese	47880	8.46	5659.6	134
7th	Paderno Dugnano	47750	14.1	3386.5	163
8th	Rozzano	41581	13.01	3196.1	103
9th	San Giuliano Milanese	37235	30.71	1212.5	98
10th	Pioltello	36756	13.1	2805.8	156

== See also ==
- Milan metropolitan area
- Metropolitan City of Milan
