= Legnano =

Comune in Lombardy, Italy

Legnano Legnàn (Lombard)
- Comune
- Comune di Legnano
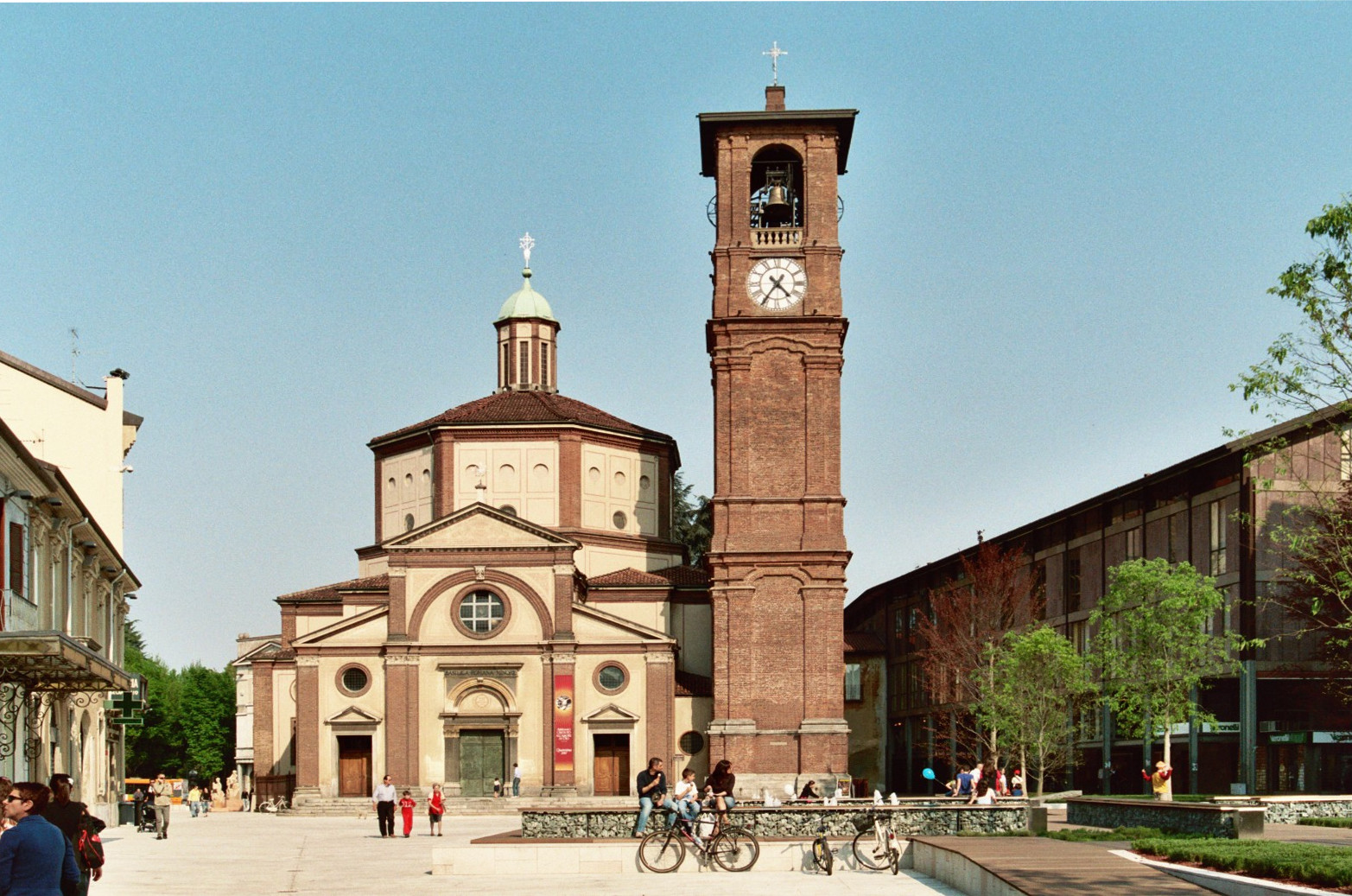
- Basilica of San Magno

- Coat of arms

- Legnano within the Province of Milan

- Location within Italy Location within Lombardy
- Coordinates: 45°34′41″N 08°55′06″E
- Country: Italy
- Region: Lombardy
- Metropolitan city: Milan (MI)

Government
  - Mayor: Lorenzo Radice (Democratic Party)

Area
  - Total: 17 km^{2} (6.6 sq mi)
- Elevation: 199 m (653 ft)

Population (30 November 2011)
  - Total: 60,282
  - Density: 3,500/km^{2} (9,200/sq mi)
- Demonym: Legnanesi
- Time zone: UTC+1 (CET)
  - Summer (DST): UTC+2 (CEST)
- Postal code: 20025
- Dialing code: 0331
- Patron saint: St. Magnus
- Saint day: 5 November
- Website: Official website

Legnano (Italian pronunciation: [leɲˈɲaːno]; Legnanese: Legnàn or Lignàn) (Note: Legnàn has more cultured origins, while Lignàn is the most popular version: this distinction, however, has disappeared during the 20th century, and now the only diction used is the first) is a town and comune (municipality) in the province of Milan, about 20 kilometres (12 mi) from central Milan. With 60,259, it is the thirteenth-most populous township in Lombardy. Legnano is located in the Alto Milanese and is crossed by the Olona River.

The history of Legnano and its municipal area has been traced back to the 1st millennium BC via archaeological evidence. Already in remote times, in fact, the hills that line the Olona had proved to be habitable places. The town was established in 1261.

Because of the historic victory of the Lombard League over Frederick Barbarossa at Legnano, it is the only town other than Rome named in the Italian national anthem ("[...] Dall'Alpi a Sicilia dovunque è Legnano [...]", en. "From the Alps to Sicily, Legnano is everywhere"). Every year the people of Legnano commemorate the battle with Palio di Legnano. In the institutional sphere, on 29 May, the date of the battle of Legnano, it was chosen as the regional holiday of Lombardy.

== Geography ==
=== Territory ===
Located in the south of the Varese Prealps along the Olona valley, the comune of Legnano has an area of 12.72 square kilometers (4.91 sq mi), has an elevation of 192–227 meters (630–745 ft) above sea level, and is seismically classified in Zone 4 (Irrelevant seismology).

The valley soil is mainly composed of sand, gravel, and clay. A thin layer of humus also used to coat the valley, rendering it a moorland useless to agriculture.

=== Hydrography ===
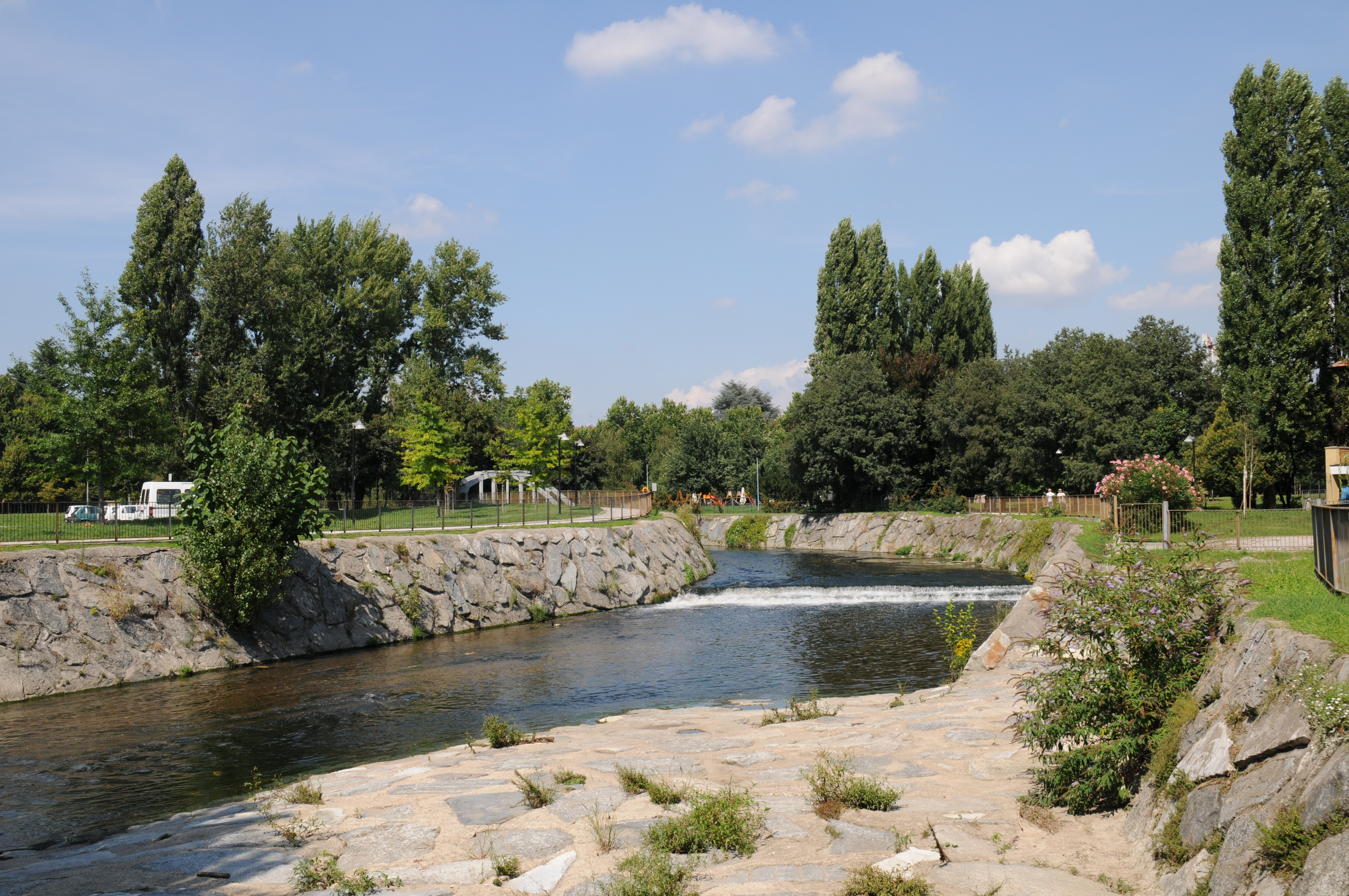
The Olona River in Legnano.

Legnano is crossed by the Olona River, which cuts Legnano into two nearly equally sized portions. The Olona has a number of deviations both natural, such as the Olonella, located near Visconti Castle, and artificial. The latter of these are the diversionary channels and levees that encase much of the river as it flows through Legnano, especially around the former Cantoni and Dell'Acqua cotton mills.

These were built because the Olona was prone to damaging floods, but consequently made the Olona one of the most polluted rivers in Italy. The pollution of the river is gradually lessening, however, while the last damaging flood occurred on 13 September 1995, and the last in chronological order occurred in July 2014.

For the vast majority of the city's stretch, the waterway is pernilted into levee or stone embankments, which were built to minimize flooding. The Olona, before the construction of embankments and drainage channels, was in fact a river that scourged with frequent floods the areas it crosses.

In the past there were deviations of the course of the river: natural, such as the Olonella, and artificial, such as the canals and the disclaimed by the peasants. The latter were necessary to reach, for irrigation purposes, the land farthest from the Olona. The extraction of water from the river, and more generally the activities related to the exploitation of the Olona, were regulated over the centuries, by contracts and regulations.

=== Urban planning ===
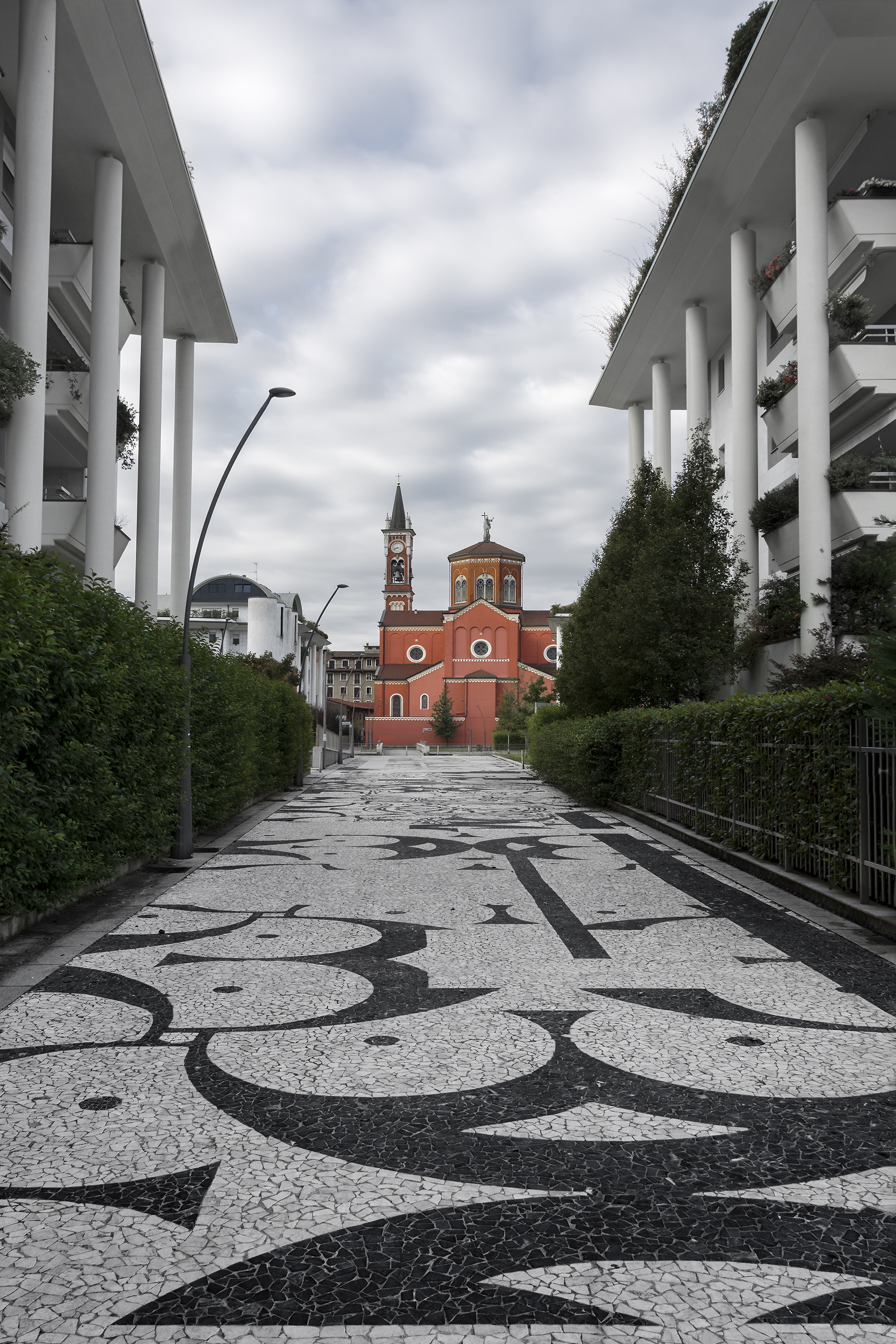
The mosaic of via dei bambini, located on the area once belonging to the Cantons cotton mill. In the background, the church of San Domenico.

The urban fabric of Legnano has developed around the old town; its growth was influenced by three barriers: the Olona River, the strada statale del Sempione and the Domodossola–Milan railway.

The city was the protagonist of a progressive urbanization that led to a considerable expansion of the population center. At the origin of this phenomenon was the birth of many industries that attracted workers from different parts of Italy. As can be seen from the demographic evolution, between 1871 and 1921 the population of Legnano quadrupled. Due to the need for water, the mussel industries born in the 19th century sprung up along the shores of the Olona. As a result, the new residential districts have occupied the free areas beyond the river valley.

As a result of the growth of Legnano, the companies have built their locations more and more on the outskirts. Then, the various economic crises that followed in the decades of the 20th century led to the birth of many brownfield sites that are recovering. The most important urban intervention, which was carried out at the beginning of the 21st century, was the recovery from the former Cotonificio Cantoni, an area of 110,000 square meters that was destined to residential and commercial area.

=== Historical subdivisions ===
In Legnano there is a historical subdivision into neighborhoods. The historic neighborhoods of Legnano are Mazzafame, Ponzella, Frati, Olmina, Canazza, Gabinella, Legnanello, Colli di Sant'Erasmo and Costa San Giorgio. The part of the town to the west of the railway is called oltrestazione, while the part to the east of the strada statale del Sempione is called oltresempione. The eight historical contrade competing at the Palio di Legnano are San Bernardino, La Flora, Legnarello, (Note: Legnanello is the neighbour, Legnarello is the contrada) San Domenico, San Magno, San Martino, Sant'Ambrogio and Sant'Erasmo.

== Climate ==
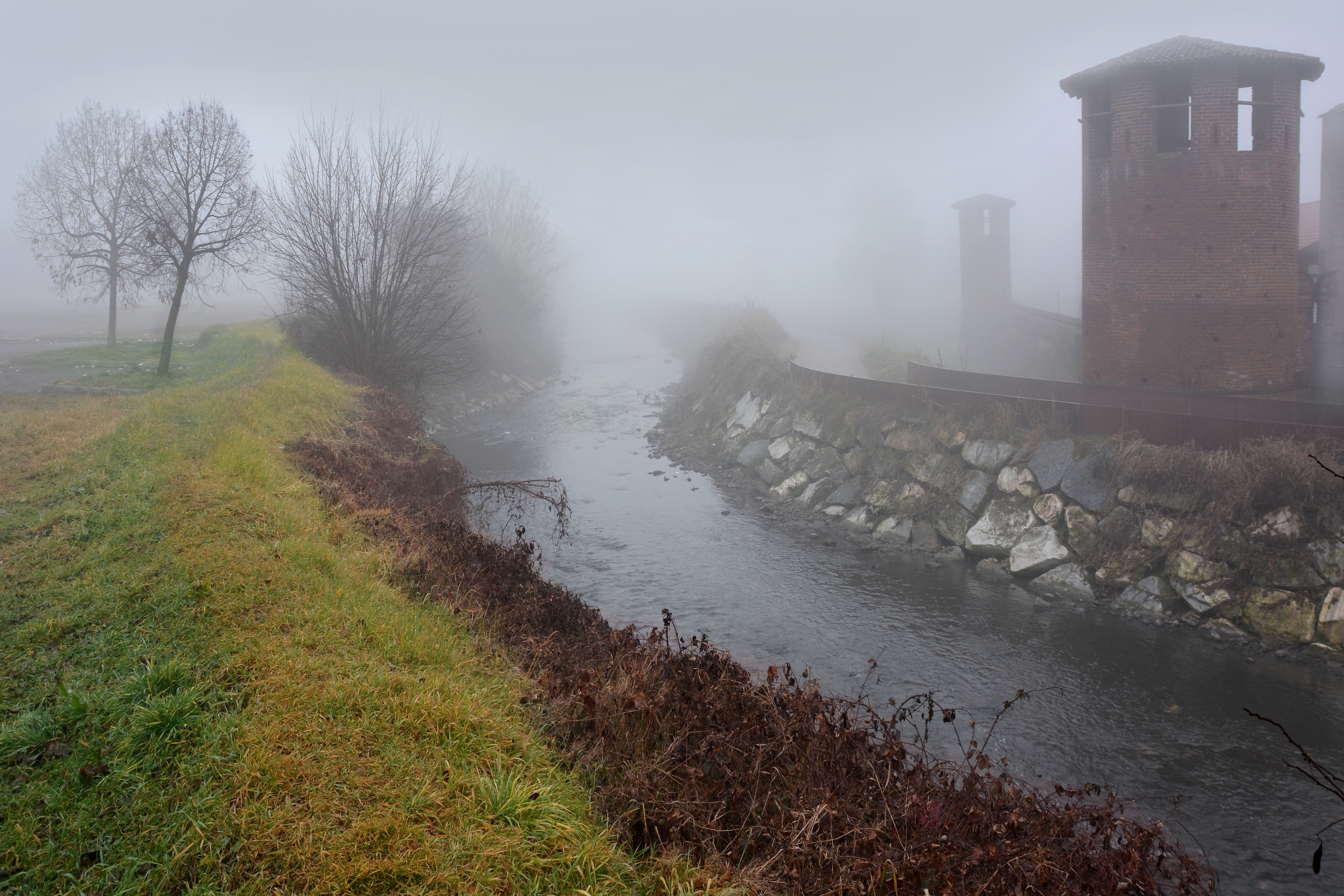
Fog at the Visconti Castle of Legnano.

According to the climatic classification of Italian comunes, Legnano is in Zone E with a rating of 2451 GR/G. Due to its location in the upper Po Valley, Legnano has a Continental climate with cold winters characterized by many days of snowfall and fog. Summers are hot humid, and moderately wet; temperatures can exceed 30 °C (86 °F) and humidity 80%. That humidity persists for the entire year because of precipitation brought on by cyclones originating in the Mediterranean or in the Russian north. That precipitation itself remains in the Po Valley because of its poor ventilation.

Data from the Milan Malpensa meteorological station indicates that, based on the more than thirty years (1961–1990) of reference accumulated by the World Meteorological Organization, that the average temperature of the Milan area the coldest month, January, is −4 °C (25 °F) and that of the hottest month, July, is 28 °C (82 °F). Rainfall averages at 1,000-millimetre (39 in) and has peaks in spring and autumn, countered by a relative drop during the winter.

The basic climatic data of Legnano are:

Climate data for Milano Malpensa
Month	Jan	Feb	Mar	Apr	May	Jun	Jul	Aug	Sep	Oct	Nov	Dec	Year
Record high °C (°F)	21.0 (69.8)	24.4 (75.9)	25.4 (77.7)	28.0 (82.4)	30.7 (87.3)	34.3 (93.7)	37.0 (98.6)	35.8 (96.4)	33.9 (93.0)	28.1 (82.6)	22.8 (73.0)	21.1 (70.0)	37.0 (98.6)
Mean daily maximum °C (°F)	6.1 (43.0)	8.6 (47.5)	13.1 (55.6)	17.0 (62.6)	21.3 (70.3)	25.5 (77.9)	28.6 (83.5)	27.6 (81.7)	24.0 (75.2)	18.2 (64.8)	11.2 (52.2)	6.9 (44.4)	17.3 (63.2)
Mean daily minimum °C (°F)	−4.4 (24.1)	−2.5 (27.5)	0.4 (32.7)	4.3 (39.7)	9.0 (48.2)	12.6 (54.7)	15.3 (59.5)	14.8 (58.6)	11.5 (52.7)	6.4 (43.5)	0.7 (33.3)	−3.6 (25.5)	5.4 (41.7)
Record low °C (°F)	−18.0 (−0.4)	−15.6 (3.9)	−12.2 (10.0)	−6.1 (21.0)	−5.2 (22.6)	0.6 (33.1)	4.7 (40.5)	4.7 (40.5)	0.5 (32.9)	−5.3 (22.5)	−13.6 (7.5)	−15.2 (4.6)	−18.0 (−0.4)
Average precipitation mm (inches)	67.5 (2.66)	77.1 (3.04)	99.7 (3.93)	106.3 (4.19)	132.0 (5.20)	93.3 (3.67)	66.8 (2.63)	97.5 (3.84)	73.2 (2.88)	107.4 (4.23)	106.3 (4.19)	54.6 (2.15)	1,081.7 (42.61)
Average precipitation days (≥ 1.0 mm)	6	6	8	9	10	9	6	8	6	7	8	6	89
Average relative humidity (%)	78	76	69	73	74	74	74	73	74	77	80	80	75

== Toponymy ==
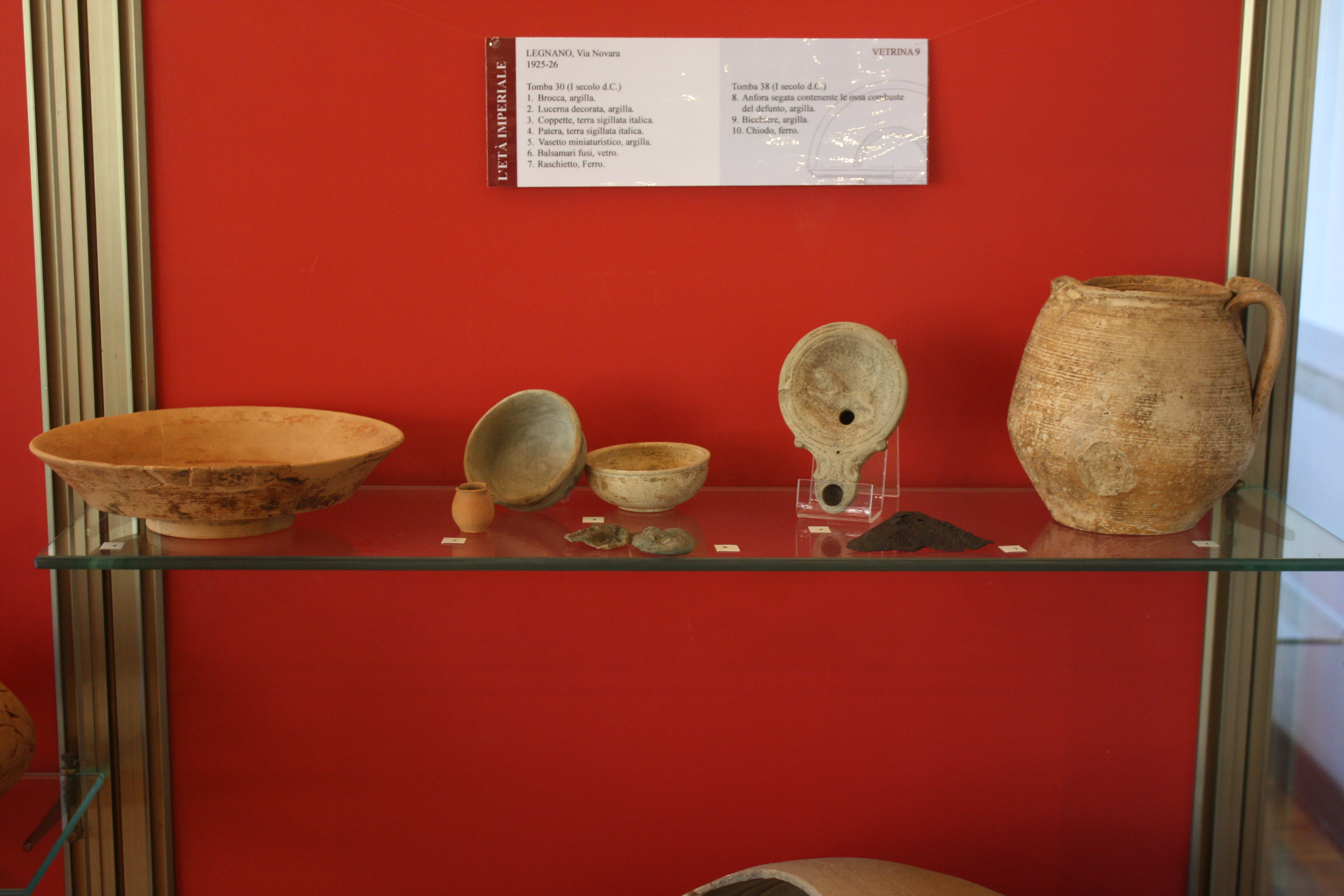
Roman finds, dating to the 1st century AD, discovered in Legnano in 1925–26. They are preserved at the Museo civico Guido Sutermeister in Legnano.

The toponymy of the name "Legnano" is uncertain, as the early settlement was known by several names, but it is obvious that Legnano's name is older than that of the surrounding municipalities. "Legnano" could have originated as a predial adjective, formed from the name of the most prominent landowner in the area. In Legnano's case, this landowner's name could have been Lemennius or Limenius, to which was adjoined the suffix -anum. This land ownership was more extensive than the modern comune of Legnano having a surface corresponding to his modern urban area, the "Legnanese".

This would confirm the complete Latinization of the Legnano area around 1st century AD; in other places where Celtic influence was still substantial, the suffix -acum would have been used. Thus, the ancient name of Legnano became Lemoniano, Leminiano or Lemegniano, later Limnianum and finally Legnanum.

Another theory advances that one of the names that Legnano was known by in the Middle Ages, Ledegnanum, derives from the name for the region, Latinanium. Therefore, any suppositions linking the name of the city to the Celtic toponym Lemonianum ("place of the sacred grove") or the predial adjective Laenianum, referring to a potential landowner named Laenius are false.

The period of foundation Legnano is unknown: the name would have at least medieval origins. According to the most important hypotheses, the genesis of ancient Legnano, whose most likely name is Latinanium, dates back to before the birth of Christ, in Roman times.

== Coat of arms ==
The coat of arms of Legnano.

The origin of this coat of arms can be clearly traced back to a coat of arms reproduced on page 193 of the Stemmario Trivulziano. In this ancient volume it can be read that the coat of arms of Legnano is very similar to that of Stemmario Cremosano.

The subject and the colors in the coat of arms of the municipality of Legnano are linked to a legend. In an unspecified historical period, in today's Piazza San Magno, a large Turkey oak. On the day of the patron saint san Magno, 5 November, a farmer began to contemplate the tree admiring its ability to withstand frost and snow. The farmer thus expressed a desire to be able to withstand the difficulties of life in the same way. At that moment, san Magno appeared, offering to satisfy man's desire by giving him the vigour, recklessness, and power of a lion.

The saint ordered the farmer to kill a rabbit and advance on the snow-soaked ground, where the animal's blood had been shed. The farmer followed orders and then san Magno fulfilled his dream by turning him into a lion. After the prodigy, the saint suddenly disappeared without appeasing the farmer who asked to return man, thus chastising his pride. The tree and the lion, along with the white of the snow and the red blood of the rabbit, became the symbols of Legnano, and were included in the coat of arms and in the municipal skirt.

On 15 August 1924, the municipality of Legnano was granted the title of city.

== History ==
=== Prehistory and Roman times ===
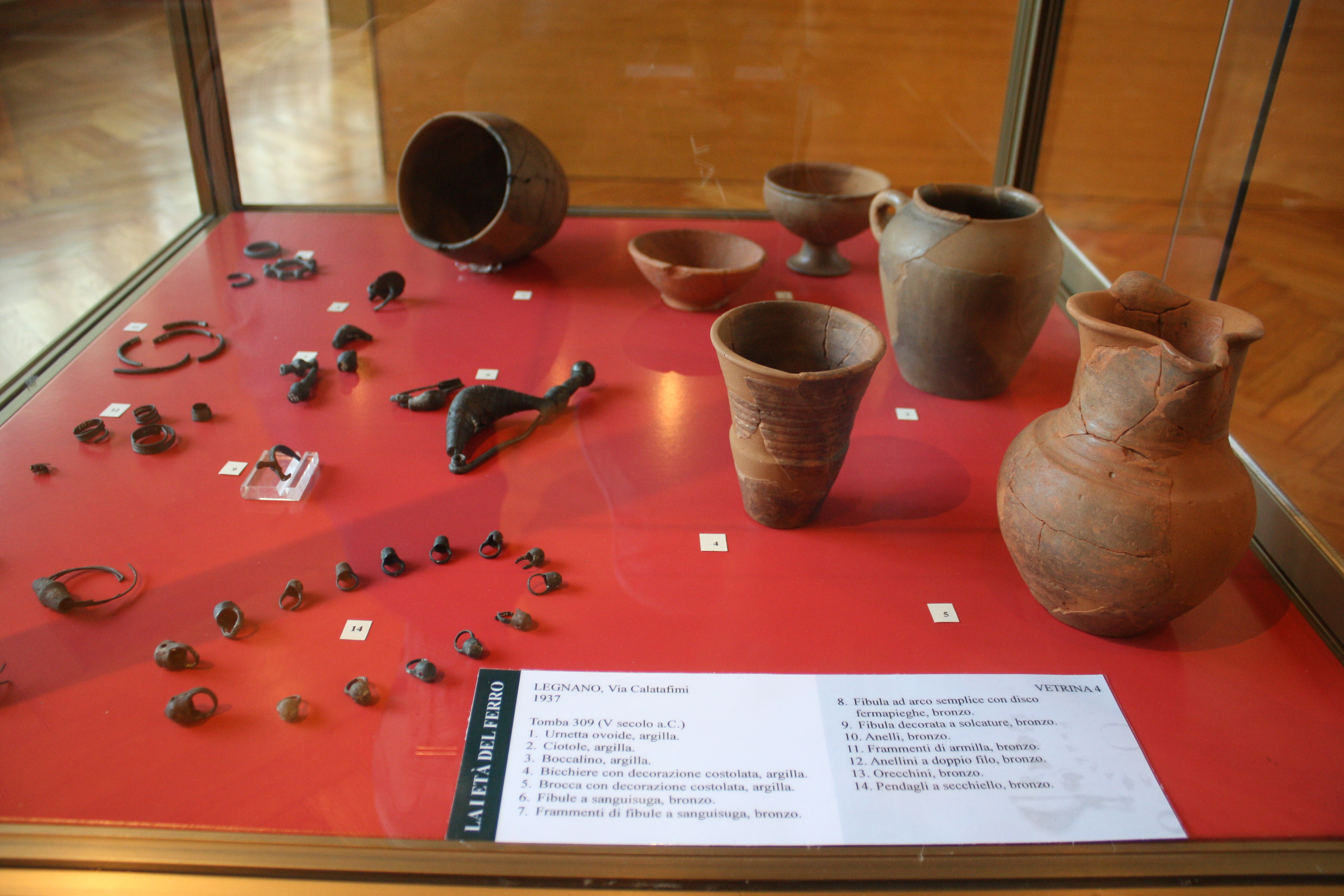
Findings linked to the Culture of Golasecca recent (V sec. BC) found in 1937 in Legnano and preserved at the Museo civico Guido Sutermeister.

The most ancient evidence of settlement in Legnano dates to the Remedello culture (21st–19th centuries BC). Later it was a Celtic center, conquered by the Romans in the 1st century BC.

Since ancient times the inhabitants of Legnano lived on the edge of the river Olona Valley. These land, higher than the river, were not flooded by the regular floods of the waterway. As a result, the most important archaeological finds, from prehistory to Roman rule, were discovered along the edges of the Olona valley; these finds mainly refer to inhumations.

The oldest furnishings found in Legnano are fragments of a vase that can be traced back to Remedello's culture. They were born between 1926 and 1928 near the border between Castellanza and Legnano, dating from between 34th century BC and 22nd century BC. Bronzes dating back to the 4th century BC and 1st century BC (linked to La Tène culture) have been found from an archaeological site near the strada statale del Sempione.

The ancient vicus of Legnanum, which belonged to the regio XI Transpadana, one of Italy's Augustean regions, was connected to the surrounding areas through important communication routes, the most important of which was a Roman road built in the 1st century AD, the Via Severiana Augusta, which skirted the Olona River at the modern strada statale del Sempione, which connected ancient Mediolanum (the modern Milano) to Lake Maggiore.

The most important Roman-era finds were discovered in 1925 in a necropolis in the east of the city. The necropolis contained coins, plates, cups, glasses, balsamari, mirrors, and iron utensils. Other tombs dating back to the same period were found in 1985 near the old town, while other archaeological excavations revealed late Roman objects. This kit consisted of pebbles, knives, razors and buckles. All these objects are on display in the Museo civico Guido Sutermeister.

=== Middle Ages ===
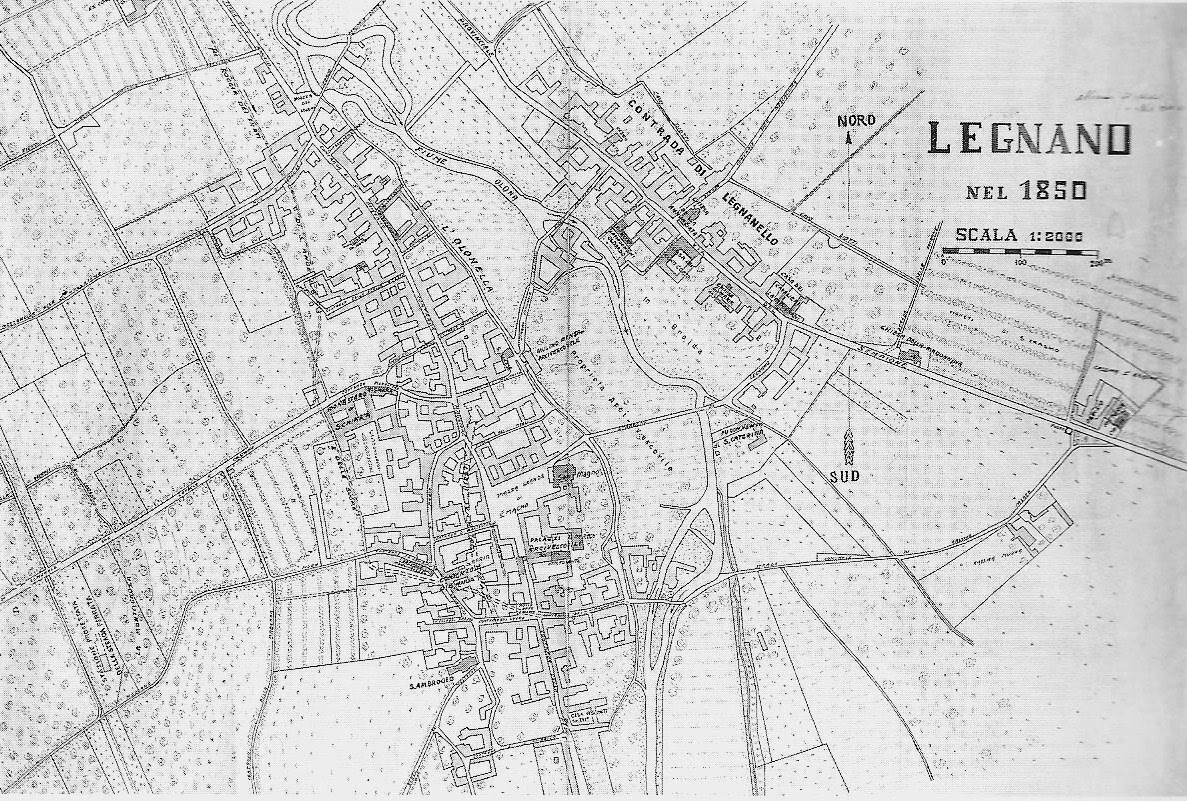
A map of Legnano from 1850: it can still see the two inhabitants of Legnano (on the left) and Legnanello (on the left) at the time still distinct and divided by the Olona and the Olonella. The two towns then settled into a single urban conglomerate with the construction expansion of the 20th century. (Note: See the two topographic maps of Legnano (dated 1925 and 1938) which are present in the text of D'Ilario, Gianazza, Marinoni and Turri (1984) at p. 352 and p. 353.)

The first document received on the history of Legnano concerns the quartier of Legnanello. This act, which refers to a trade in land located in the small neighbour, is dated 23 October 789. Within this written testimony can be read:

[...] curtem proprietatis nostre in Leunianello [...]

— Longobard diplomatic code, LIV number

This written testimony in English means "[...] with our properties in Legnanello [...]". It seems that Legnanello existed as early as 687, when the religious celebration of the Candlemas (the Candelora) began, introduced by Pope Sergius I, who officiated every 2 February.

The first mention of the main settlement of Legnano is related to the capture of Arialdo, head of the pataria, which took place inside the castle of the Cotta in Legnano, that was built in 10th century and demolished in 13th/14th century (this fortification was one of military outpost of Lombard League during the Battle of Legnano, fought on 29 May 1176).

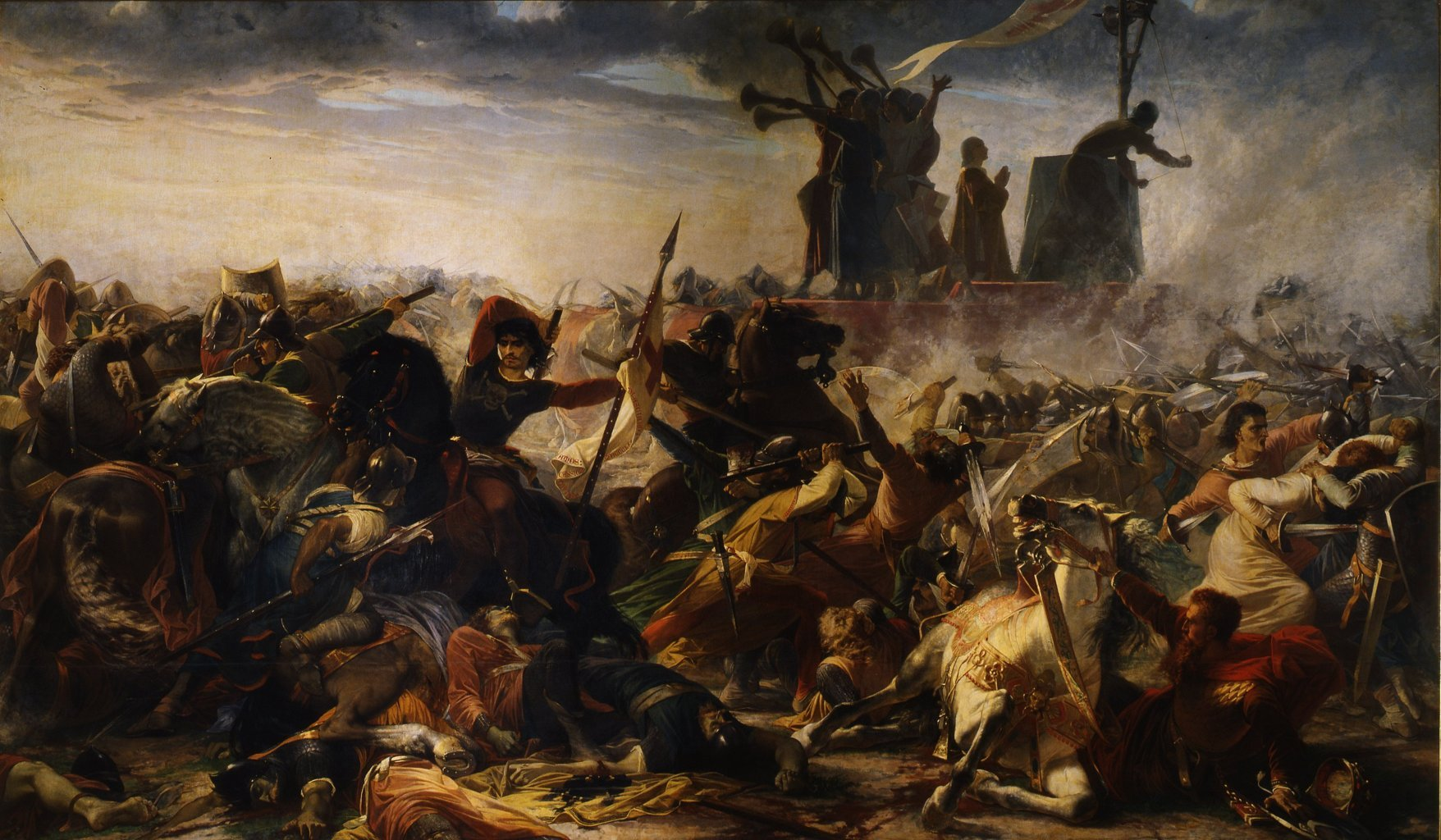
The defense of the Carroccio during the Battle of Legnano by Amos Cassioli (1860)

On the Historia Mediolanensis written by Landulf Junior in the 11th century which deals with the history of Milan in the Middle Ages, it can in fact be read that Arialdo was captured:

[...] iuxta locum Legnani [...]

— Historia Mediolanensis

This testimony in English means "[...] near Legnano [...]". Leone da Perego, Bishop of Milan from 1241 to 1257, also stayed in Legnano. He lived in the palace of the same name, Palazzo Leone da Perego, where he died on 14 October 1257. At first he was buried in the Church of Sant'Ambrogio, but then the body disappeared. In 1258, the community of Legnano approved its first statutes, a deliberation that formally gave birth to the municipality of modern Legnano.

A video showing the stages of the Battle of Legnano, highlighting the movements of the troops

In April 1273, the Visconti Castle of Legnano hosted the royals Edward I of England and Eleanor of Castile on their way back from their trip to the Middle East. Bonvesin da la Riva, the greatest poet and writer of Lombardy in the 13th century and one of the exponent more prominent of the didactic poetic movement of northern Italy, lived in the city until 1288. The literary man described Legnano with these verses:

[...] Among all the cities of Lombardy is lauded as the rose or lily among the flowers, such as cedar in Lebanon, as the lion among the quadrupeds, like the eagle among the birds, so as to appear as the sun among the celestial bodies, for the fertility of the soil and the availability of the necessities fundamental for the men [...]

— Bonvesin de la Riva

In the Middle Ages, the city was the location of the Battle of Legnano in which Emperor Frederick I was defeated by the Lombard League (1176). Because of the historic victory of the Lombard League over Frederick Barbarossa, it is the only town other than Rome named in the Italian national anthem ("[...] Dall'Alpi a Sicilia dovunque è Legnano [...]", en. "From the Alps to Sicily, Legnano is everywhere"). Every year the people of Legnano commemorate the battle with Palio di Legnano. In the institutional sphere, on 29 May, the date of the battle of Legnano, it was chosen as the regional holiday of Lombardy.

Although the presence of the enemy in the surroundings was already known to both sides, they met suddenly without having time to plan any strategy. The Battle of Legnano was crucial in the long war waged by the Holy Roman German Empire to try to assert its power over the municipalities of northern Italy, who decided to put aside each other's rivalries by allied themselves in a military-led union symbolically by Pope Alexander III, the Lombard League, whose symbol was the Carroccio.

The battle ended the fifth and final descent into Italy of Emperor Federico Barbarossa, who after the defeat tried to resolve the Italian question by attempting the diplomatic approach. This resulted a few years later in the peace of Constance (25 June 1183), with which the Emperor recognized the Lombard League by granting administrative, political and judicial concessions to the municipalities and officially ending his attempt to hegemonize Northern Italy.

=== From 13th century to 15th century ===
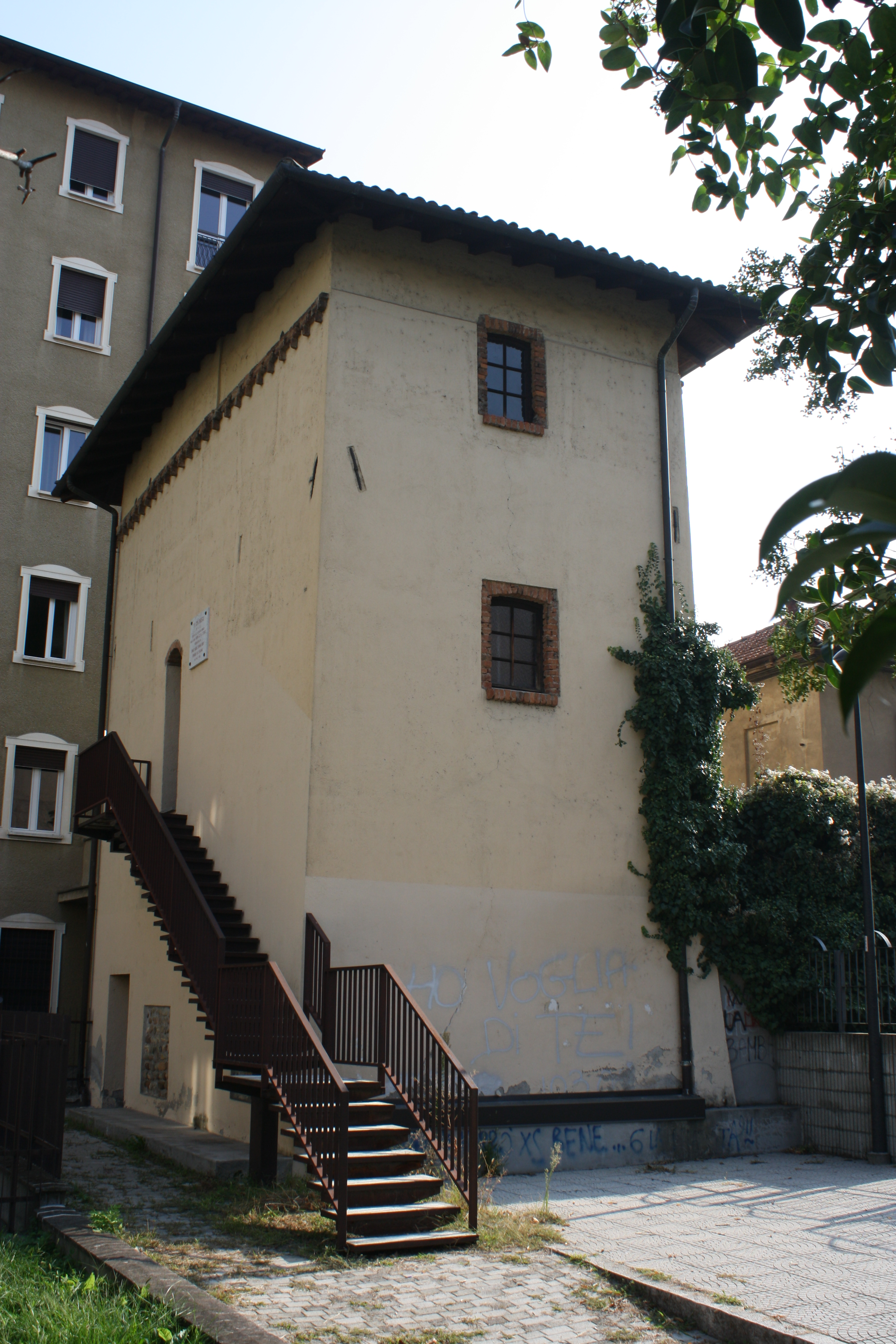
The fifteenth-century Torre Colombera.

Already in the Middle Ages Legnano was not considered a village, but a borgo, a denomination reserved in Italy for comuni with a market and a fortification. These infrastructures generally stood in the most populous centers and also served the neighboring centers.

During the Renaissance, Legnano was dominated by several noble families. The main ones were the Lampugnani, Vismara, Visconti, Crivelli, Maino and Caimi. During the 15th century Legnano was enriched with many noble dwellings, which built to the Visconti Castle of Legnano, that replaced in the role of fortification of the borgo the already mentioned castle of the Cotta, and the Palazzo Leone da Perego, that was built by the eponymous archbishop.

The only civil built in the 15th century that has not been demolished is Torre Colombera, which is now located between corso Garibaldi and via Del Gigante, near the Church of San Domenico, embedded in a building over the street.

In 1549 the population, decimated by the plague epidemics of 1529 and of 1540, was 576 inhabitants, spread to 184 families. Already in these centuries the agriculture was very diverse. The main crops were cereals (millet and wheat), grapevine and mulberry, which is the basis of the breeding of silkworms. In addition to cereal farming, the wood economy was also based on livestock farming and crafts.

The construction of the convents and most of the churches of Legnano, on the other hand, dates back to the Counter-Reformation: the noble families of the time competed to win the favor of the Milanese archbishops by tying their name to works of charity or to works for the benefit of the community.

=== From 16th century to 19th century ===
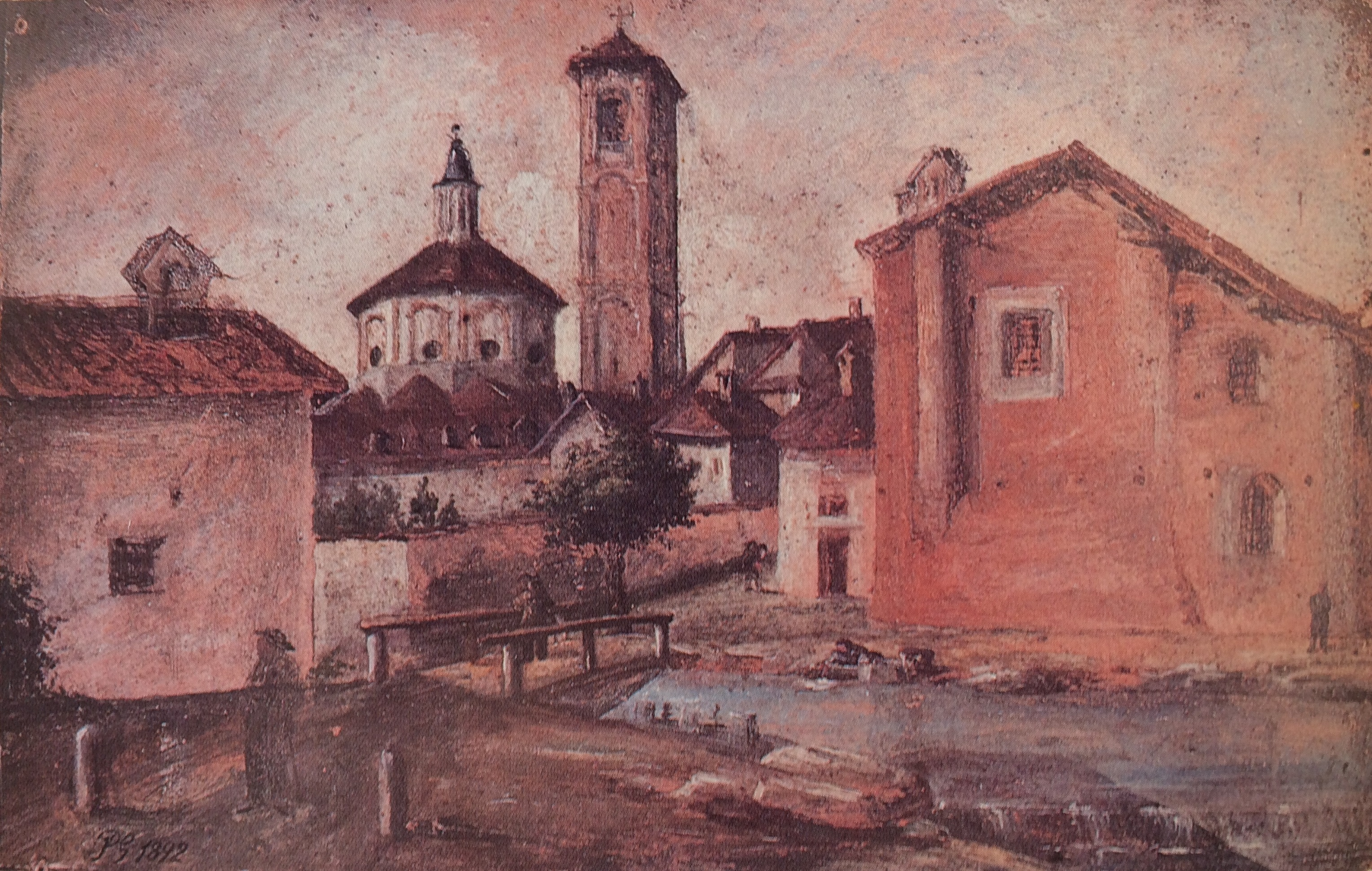
The demolished Mulino Arcivescovile in Legnano in 1849.

The hallmark of the 18th and 19th centuries was the construction of many watermills along the Olona. In the period of maximum expansion of the activity of watermills, in Legnano, seventeen mills could be counted, exploiting the driving force of the Olona river. The last seven in Legnano were demolished between the 19th and 20th centuries to be replaced by more modern plants, which exploited the driving force of the Olona river more efficiently.

The low incomes that were provided by the agricultural and livestock economy of these centuries stimulated the peasants to integrate the use in the fields with other jobs, in which women also participated during the day. In the evening, the farmers became spinners and weavers of silk, wool and cotton, as well as dyers.

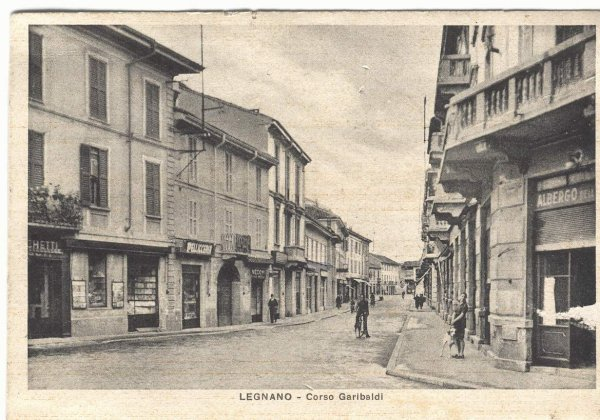
Corso Garibaldi to Piazza San Magno in Legnano. On the extreme left, the balcony from which Giuseppe Garibaldi spoke to the legnanesi urging them to erect a monument to remember the Battle of Legnano, which was later built.

During the Napoleonic era, a work was enhanced that would be decisive, together with the artisanal activities above, for the birth of industries. The government improved the strada statale del Sempione road that connected Milan with Paris on the Rho – Legnano – Gallarate – Arona – Domodossola – Brig crossing the Alps. Nowadays in Legnano the strada statale del Sempione still exists. This important communication route also greatly contributed to the strategic importance of Legnano, the second mail station from Milan.

In the 19th century the municipal administration of Legnano was governed by large landowners and members of the wealthiest bourgeoisie. She was often forced to intervene to dictate rules on agriculture, grazing and land protection, and to resolve heated disputes between farmers and millers, especially during lean Olona river periods.

On 16 June 1862, from a balcony of a building no longer existing (there was later built the headquarters of the Banca di Legnano), Giuseppe Garibaldi urged the legnanesi to build a monument in memory of the famous battle of 29 May 1176. The municipality of Legnano, stimulated by the speech of Garibaldi, erected a statue in honor of the battle, initially created by the sculptor Egidio Pozzi and then replaced in 1900 by the nowadays Monument to the Warrior of Legnano, which is the work of Enrico Butti and that it is often mistakenly associated with the legendary Lombard League leader Alberto da Giussano.

In 1882 the city was invaded by a disastrous flood of the Olona: for the courageous and philanthropic actions of its inhabitants, as can be read in the motivation of the honor, Legnano was awarded the Gold Medal of Civil Valor.

- Gold Medal for Civil Valor.

=== Industrialisation ===
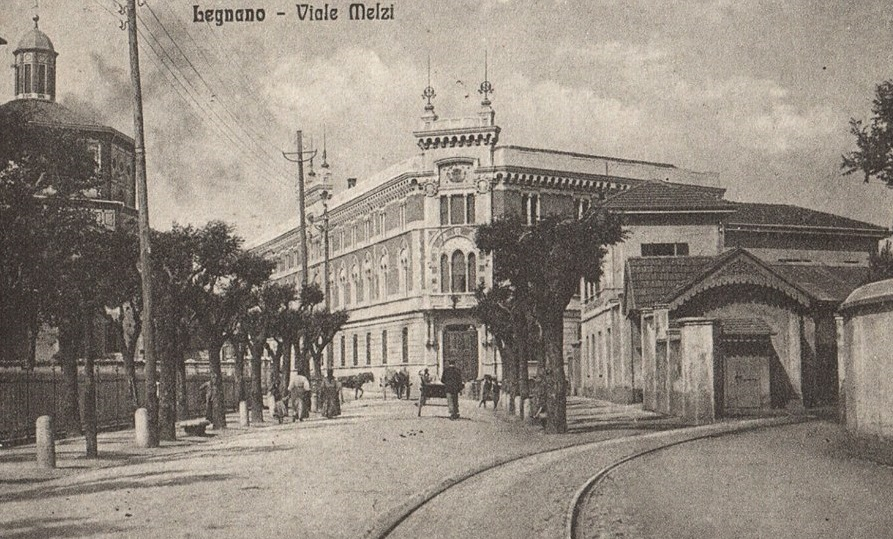
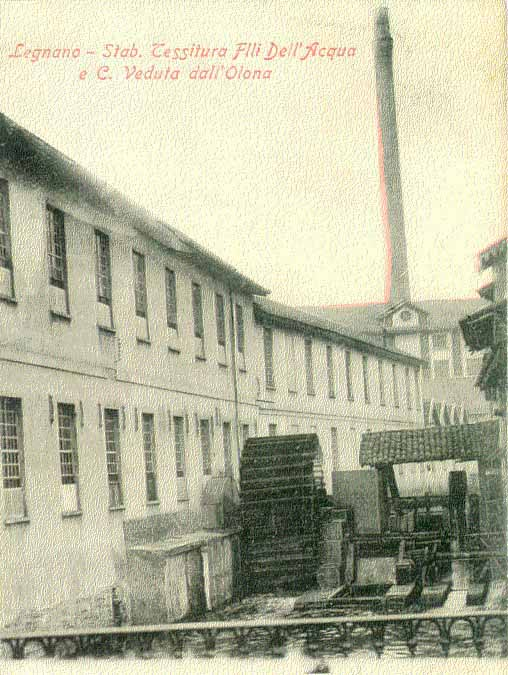
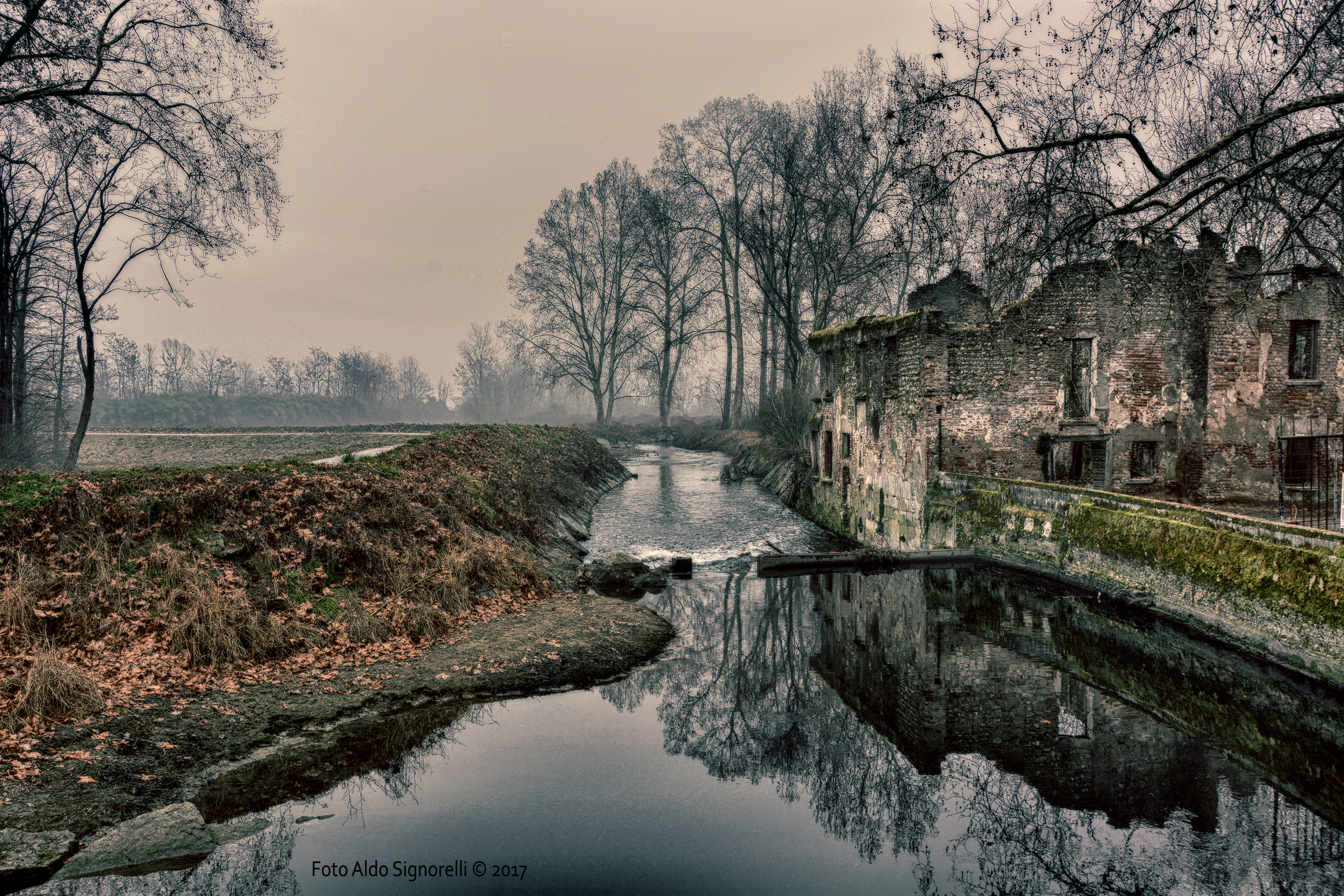
Clockwise from top:
- The Milan-Gallarate tramway in Legnano
- Cotonificio Dell'Acqua in Legnano
- The remains of the Cornaggia mill in Legnano, which are located downstream from the Visconti Castle

The first documented manufacturing activities date back to the 12th century and are linked to the processing of wool in convents, while the first proto-industrial activities, in the modern sense of the term, arose around 1830, with the opening of the nucleus of Cotonificio Cantoni. The process of industrialization in Legnano lasted from 1820 to 1880. The secular traditions of craftsmanship and home crafting, practiced to integrate work in the fields, played a decisive role in the birth of the industry in Legnano.

The spinning soured in the first decades of the 19th century then turned into real industries. Some of them grew steadily to become among the main cotton mills in Lombardy. Legnano was ideal for opening up textile industries thanks to the presence of important communication routes and that of the Olona River, which provided the energy necessary to move the hydraulic wheels before the installation of steam engines. By the second half of the 19th century, the timber companies achieved a wider production, thanks in part to the technological improvement that led some industries to have an importance that transcended national borders.

Among the Legnano's industries, the main, for organization and technology, was the Cotonificio Cantoni, according to an 1876 document kept in the archive of the municipality of Legnano. Among the largest companies operating in Legnano between the 19th and 20th centuries were, in addition to those already mentioned, the Cotonificio Bernocchi, Cotonificio Dell'Acqua, De Angeli-Frua, the Manifattura di Legnano, the mechanical companies Franco Tosi Meccanica, the Mario Pensotti and Andrea Pensotti, the FIAL, who mainly produced cars, and the cycling company Legnano. Some of these industrialists also made contributions to the construction of the hospital and high schools.

Between 1885 and 1915, the original agricultural economy of Legnano finally became an industrial system. However, industrial development led to an agricultural crisis in the area, as many farmers abandoned their activities in the fields to work in the factories of Legnano. At the turn of the two centuries there was therefore a strong industrial and commercial development. For this expansion, the infrastructure for the transport of people and goods was very important. Next to the strada statale del Sempione was built the railway station of Legnano along the Domodossola–Milan railway line and, along the latter, the Milan-Gallarate tramway, which connected Legnano to Milan. The Milan-Gallarate tramway was later abolished in the second half of the 20th century.

During the industrialisation of Legnano there was a large use of child labor. In the early 1980s, the first strikes were organized in the industry, while the first working-class societies were born.

=== 20th century ===
==== World War I ====
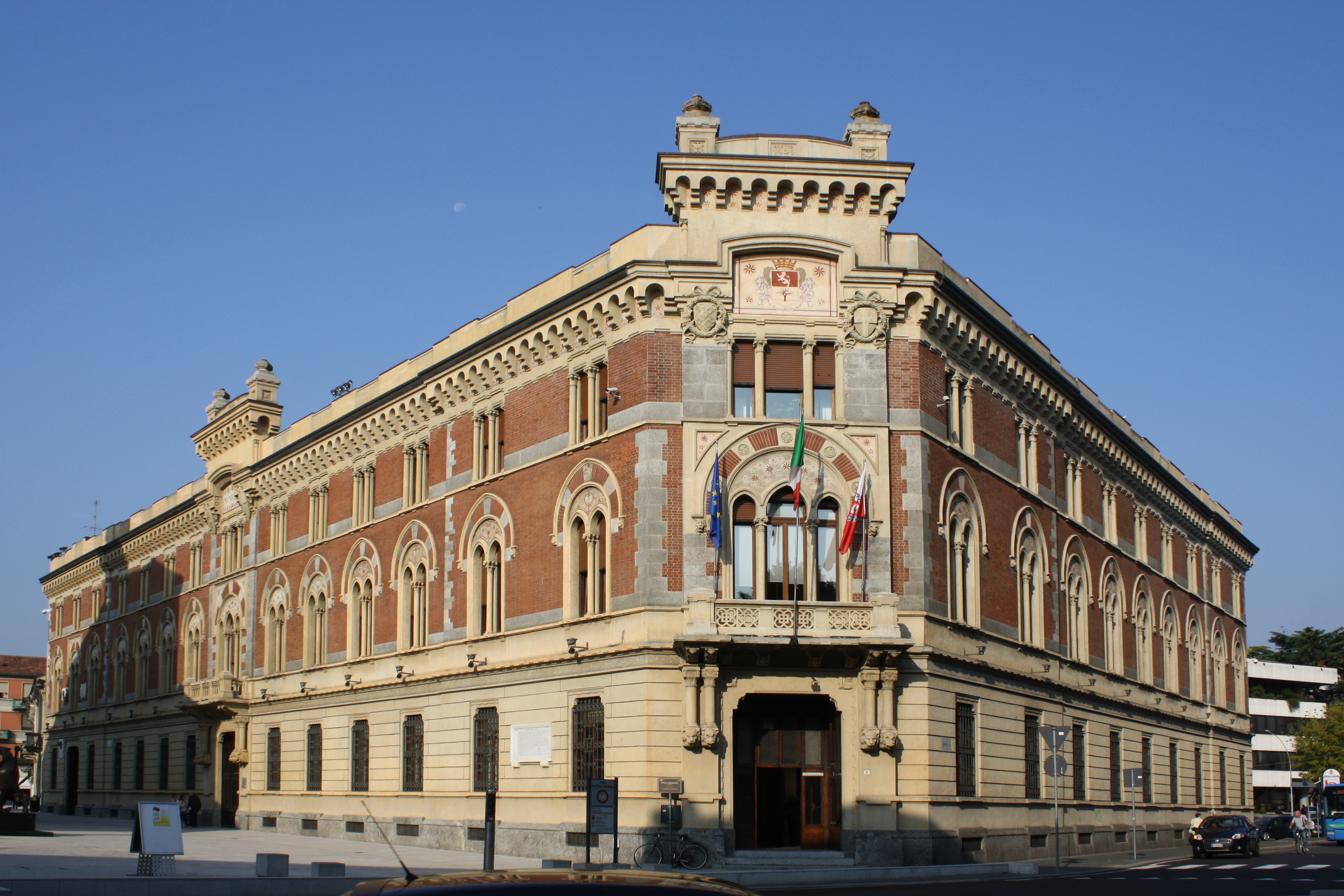
Palazzo Malinverni, Legnano town hall. It was built from 1908 to 1909 in the medieval style.

In 1915, when Italy entered into World War I, Legnano had a population of 28,757. Between the end of the 19th and the beginning of the 20th century, there was a strong population increase due to immigration, driven by the development of industry, which constituted a lure of workers and service workers. During the war, the industries of Legnano also converted their plants for the production of war supplies.

Franco Tosi Meccanica, in particular, helped equip the Royal Italian Army's artillery units. Two natural disasters, in 1917, worsened the situation caused by the war: the epidemic of Spanish flu, which mowed down the population, and a devastating flood of the Olona River, which broke the embankments and invaded the town.

==== Between the two world wars ====
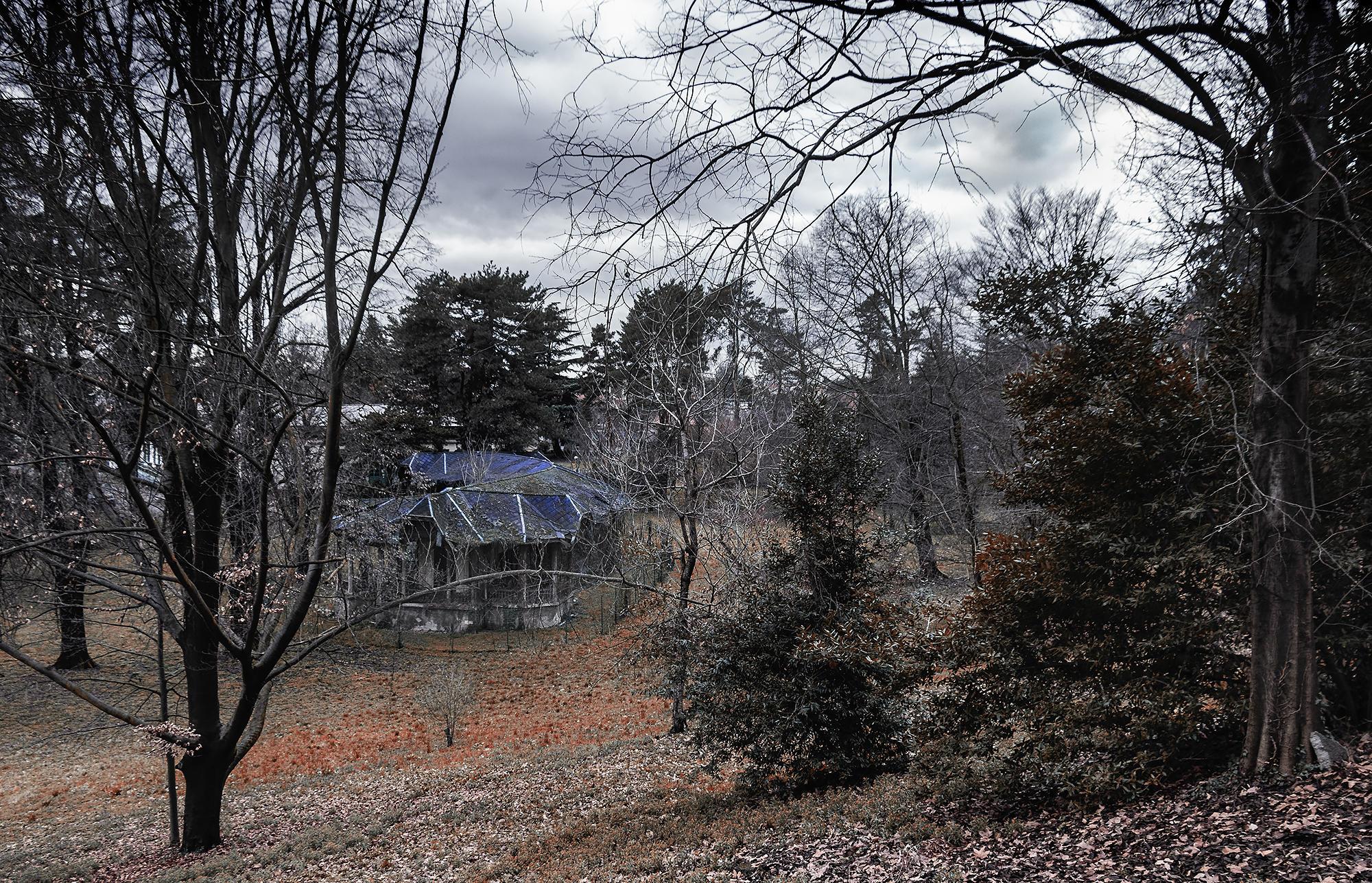
View of one of the building of the former sanatorio Regina Elena.

At the end of the World War I, in 1918, Legnano was also embroiled in deep social tensions that led, at the national level, into the Biennio Rosso period first and then fascism. The first groups inspired by the political movement founded by Benito Mussolini were formed in 1920.

In the early post-war years, the timber industry resumed its strong growth which had characterized it until before the outbreak of the conflict; this development took place despite the transformation of the Italian economy from liberal to corporate. In addition to the growth of the textile and mechanical industries, in 1927 the company Emilio Bozzi took over the bicycle construction business from Franco Tosi Meccanica, relaunching the brand Legnano.

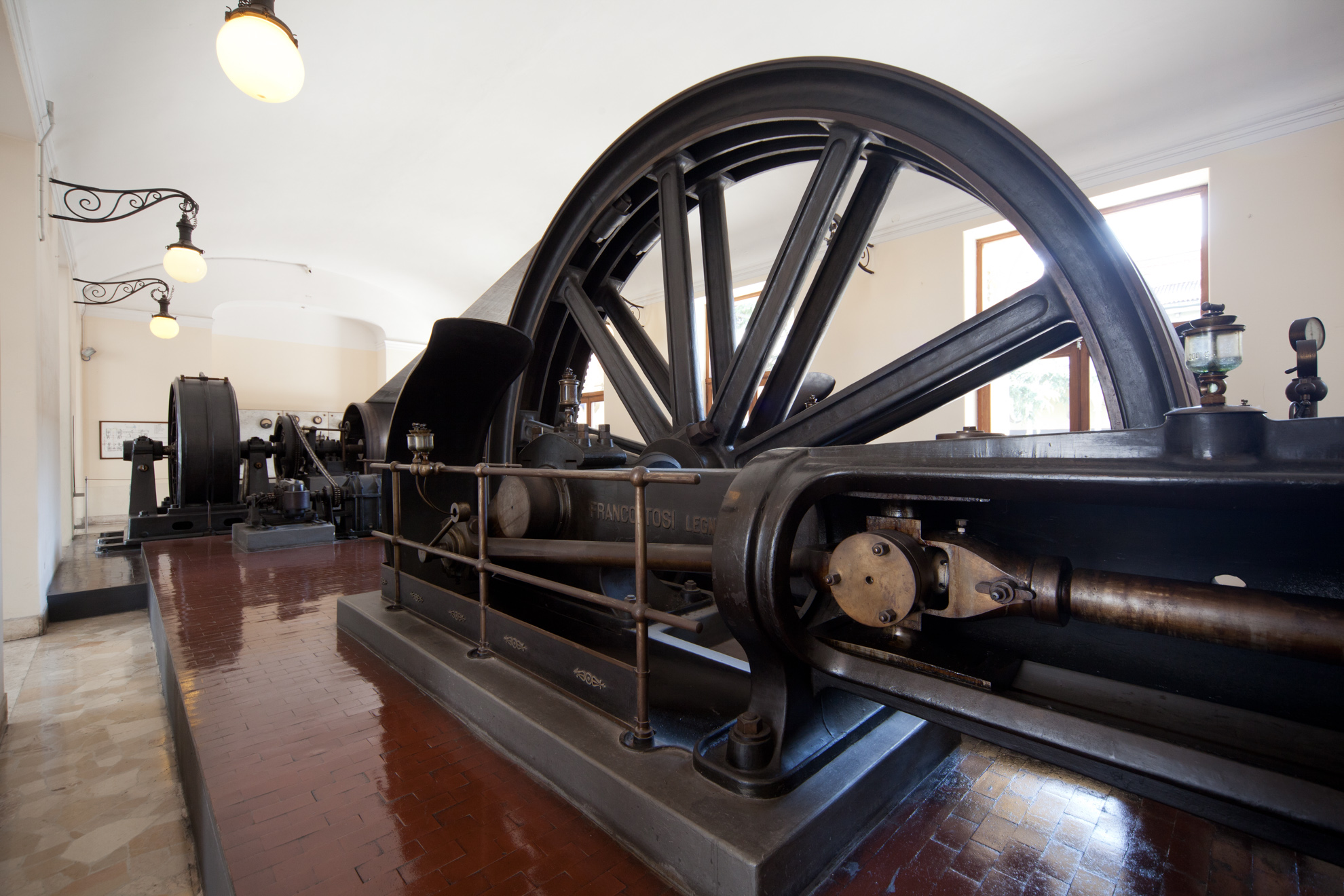
Thermal power station Regina Margherita, exposed to the Museo Nazionale Scienza e Tecnologia Leonardo da Vinci in Milan. It was built by Franco Tosi Meccanica in 1895.

The sanatorio Regina Elena is linked to two visits by members of the royal family: on 19 June 1924 by Margherita of Savoy on the occasion of the inauguration of the structure and on 27 April 1925 by King Victor Emmanuel III of Italy, who visited the complex.

According to a 1927 census, the population of Legnano was about 30,000, with 677 industrial and artisanal establishments. The workforce consisted of 9,926 textile plant employees, 4,056 mechanical factory workers, 1,762 employees in commerce, credit, insurance and other services, and 287 workers in transportation and communications.

The constant economic growth and strong population growth (Legnano passed, from 1881 to 1924, from 8,098 to 29,117 inhabitants) led to the elevation of the municipality to the city, which was conferred by royal decree on 15 August 1924 by king Victor Emmanuel III of Savoy.

- Titolo di Città (en. "title of city").

During fascism, many public works were conceived, designed and performed. The most important one that touched Legnano was the first section of the Autostrada dei Laghi, connecting to the time Milan with Gallarate. It was inaugurated on 20 September 1923 in the presence of king Victor Emmanuel III.

It was the first motorway built in the world, and was designed by the engineer Piero Puricelli. In May 1935, the first edition of the Palio di Legnano was organized to commemorate the victory of the municipalities of the Lombard League against Frederick Barbarossa in the Battle of Legnano of 29 May 1176.

==== World War II ====
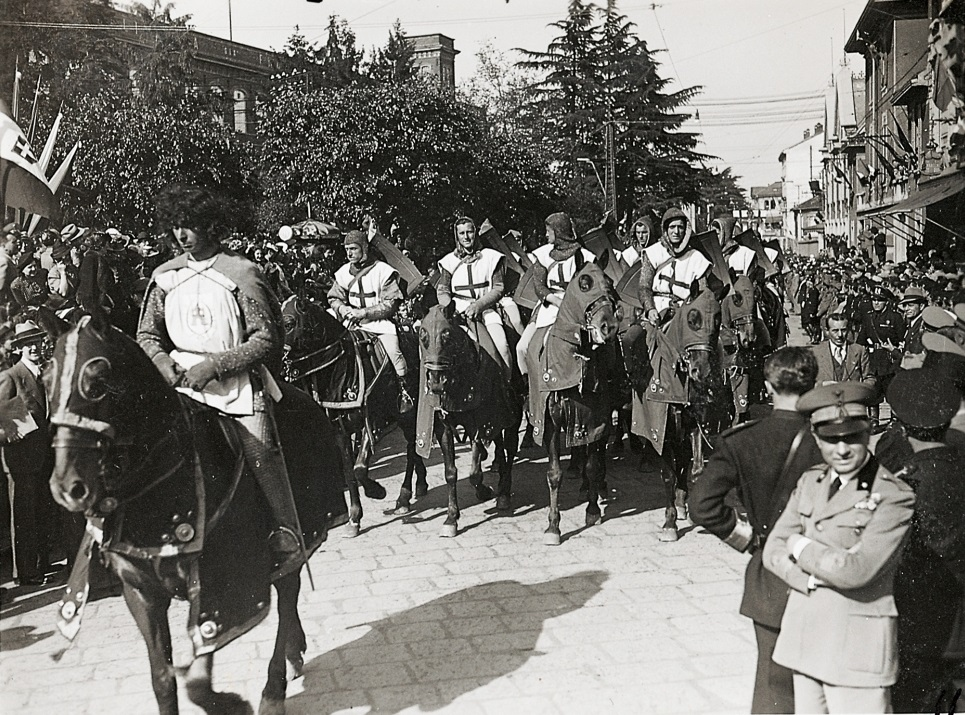
The Reggimento "Savoia Cavalleria" as the Company of Death for the Palio di Legnano 1939.

In 1940 Italy entered the World War II alongside Nazi Germany, and the events of the war were also reflected in Legnano. Many soldiers died on the battlefield, and the effects of deprivation became more acute as the months and years passed. The industries of Legnano were converted for military orders. On the night of 13–14 August 1943, planes dropped bombs on the town, resulting in a dozen deaths.

The decisive turning point of the war was the armistice of 8 September 1943 between Italy and the Allies. The next day, German armoured cars began menacing lytry through the streets of Legnano. The industry of Legnano, now controlled by the Nazis, began supplying the Third Reich with the artifacts needed to continue the war.

In October 1943, the first armed teams made up of workers, students and soldiers were formed in Legnano, and in neighbouring countries after 8 September. The partisan brigades "Carroccio" were formed, Catholic-inspired, "Garibaldi", of socialist-communist extraction, and some autonomous compatriots, among them the "Sicilia". The "Carroccio" and "Garibaldi" operated together with the partisan compatriots of Northern Italy under the provisions of the National Liberation Committee.

Legnano is one of the cities decorated after the war, having been awarded the Bronze Medal of Military Valor for the sacrifices of its people and for its activity in the partisan struggle during World War II.

- Bronze Medal for War Valor.

==== From the end of World War II to 21st century ====
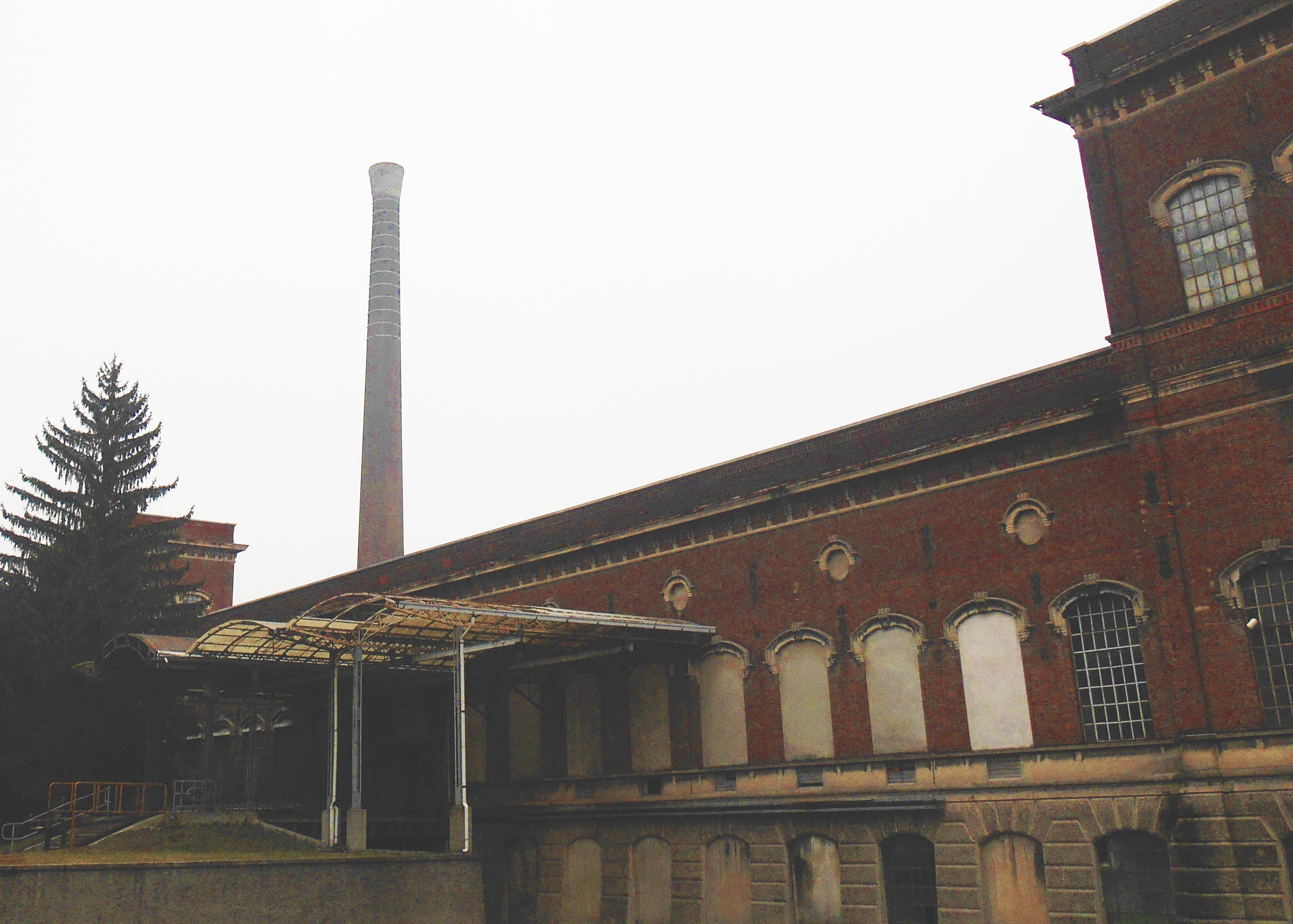
A glimpse of the legnanese plant of the Manifattura di Legnano.

After the war Legnano was hit, like the rest of Italy, by the severe economic recession following the conflict. Basic food was insufficient, public transport was limited and roads were rough. On 2 May 1945, for the first time since the fascist dictatorship, the municipal council met. The time for a return to democracy and reconstruction, after the destruction of the war, was long and tiring.

After regularized national political life, Legnano's economy returned to growth, resuming the strength of the period before the World War II. During Italy's strong economic growth during the economic boom, Legnano achieved, between 1951 and 1961, the Italian record of the highest employment index in industry compared to the total population (65.2%), second after Sesto San Giovanni.

The golden age of the Legnano industry began at the beginning of the 20th century and ended in the 1960s. The crisis progressively worsened, damaging the economy, employment and the industrial fabric. Many companies closed, especially in textiles, clothing and footwear, and many others were involved in a downsizing process, such as Franco Tosi Meccanica. The latter is the only major timber industry still active having closed its doors, in 2014, Giovanni Crespi.

Attempts were made to target the tertiary sector. In 1977 in Legnano was founded Antenna 3 Lombardia that was, that time, the most important private TV station in Italy.These alternative fields did not, however, lead to a sufficient rate of development to make up for the closure of large industrial activities. An exception to this dynamic was the foundation in Legnano, in 1985, of the fashion company Dolce & Gabbana. A phase began with the birth of small businesses. These processes continue to this day, making Legnanese a highly developed and industrialised area.

== Main sights ==
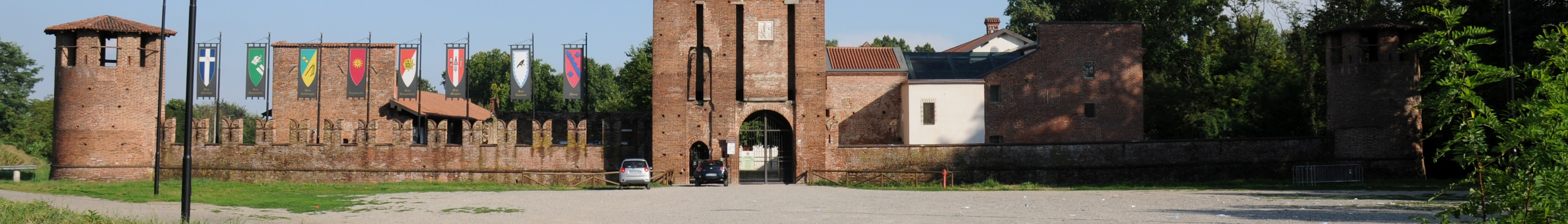
View of Visconti Castle of Legnano.

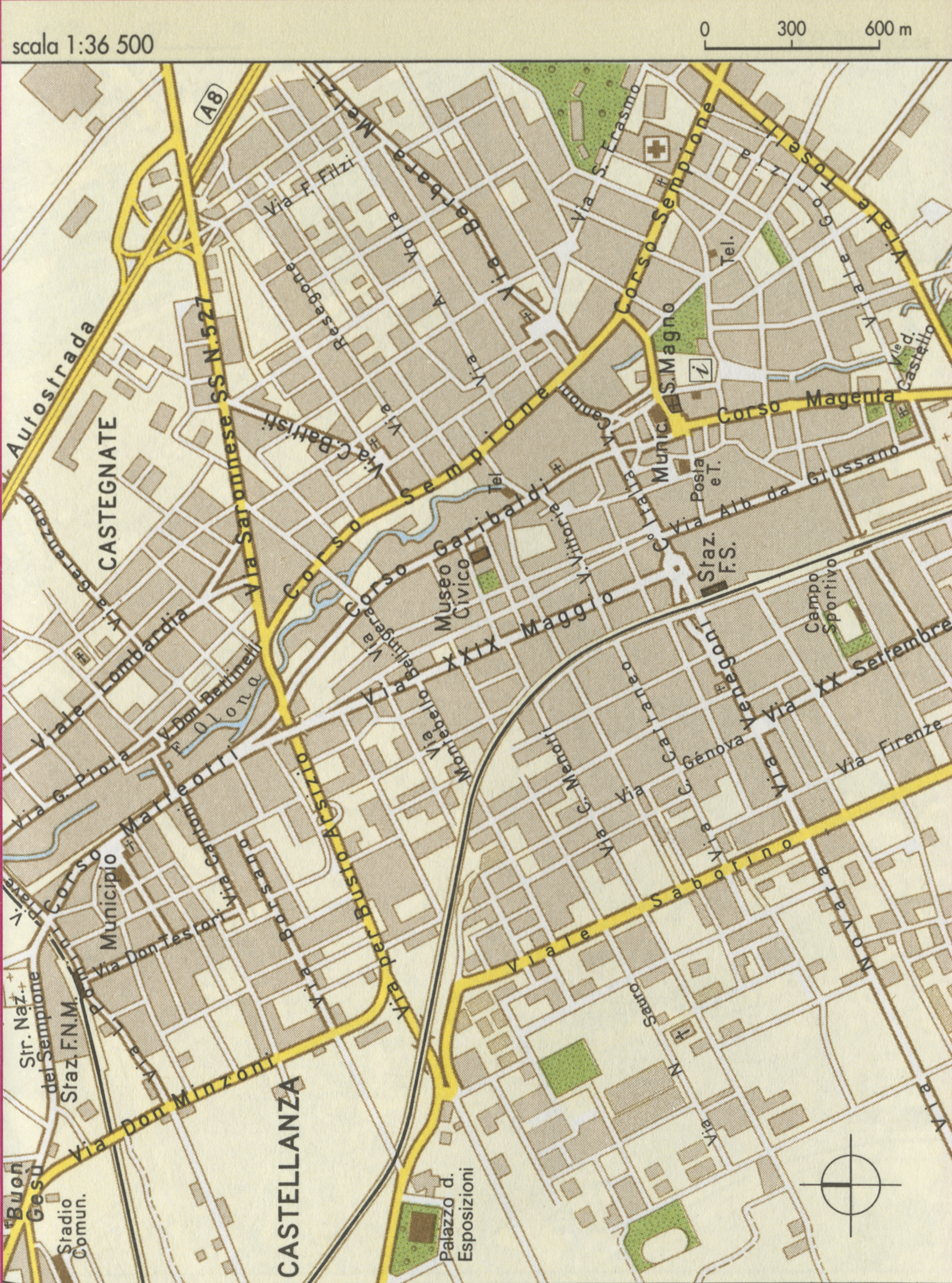
Map of Legnano city centre

=== Religious architecture ===
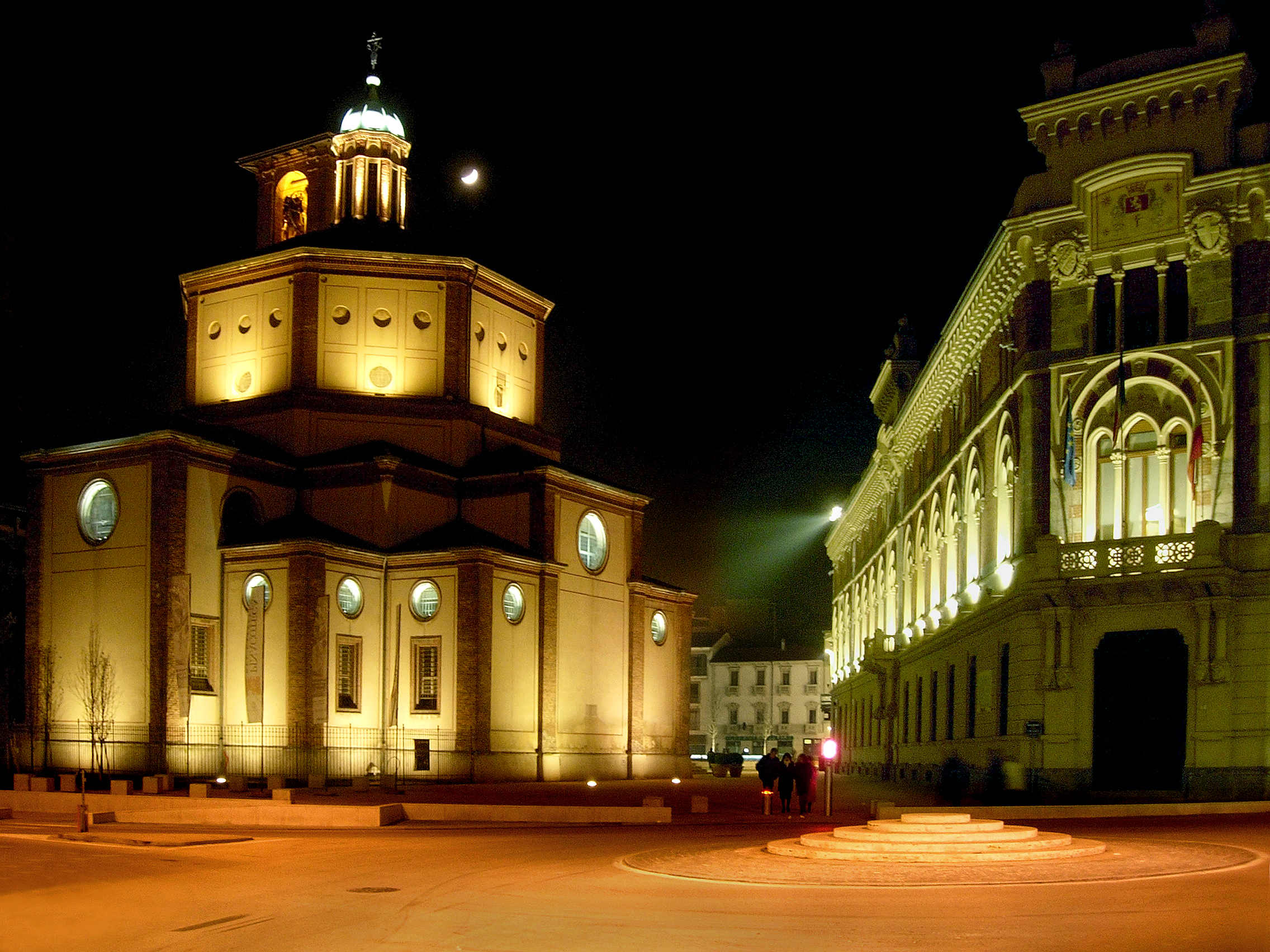
Basilica di San Magno and Palazzo Malinverni.

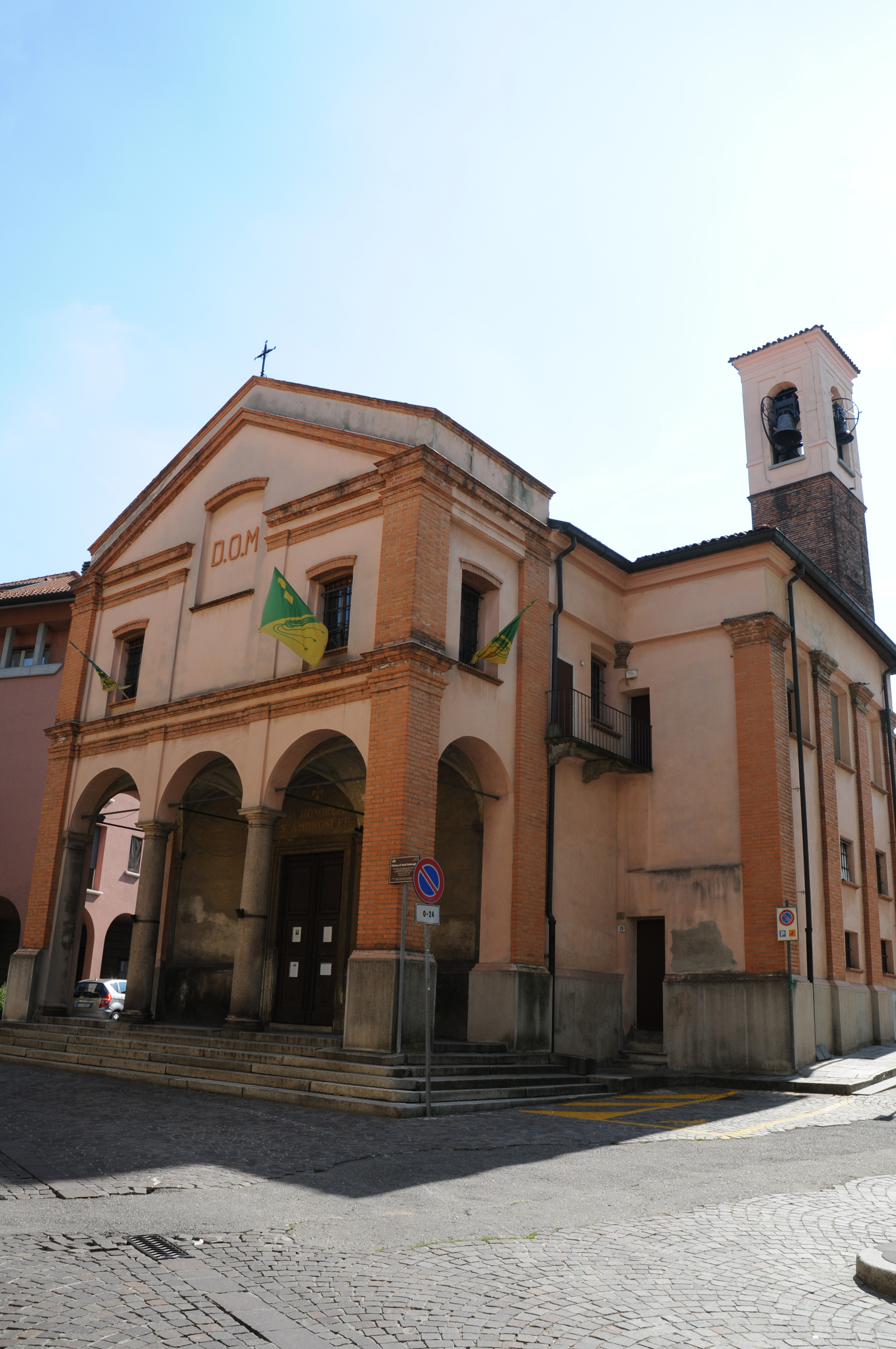
Church of Sant'Ambrogio.

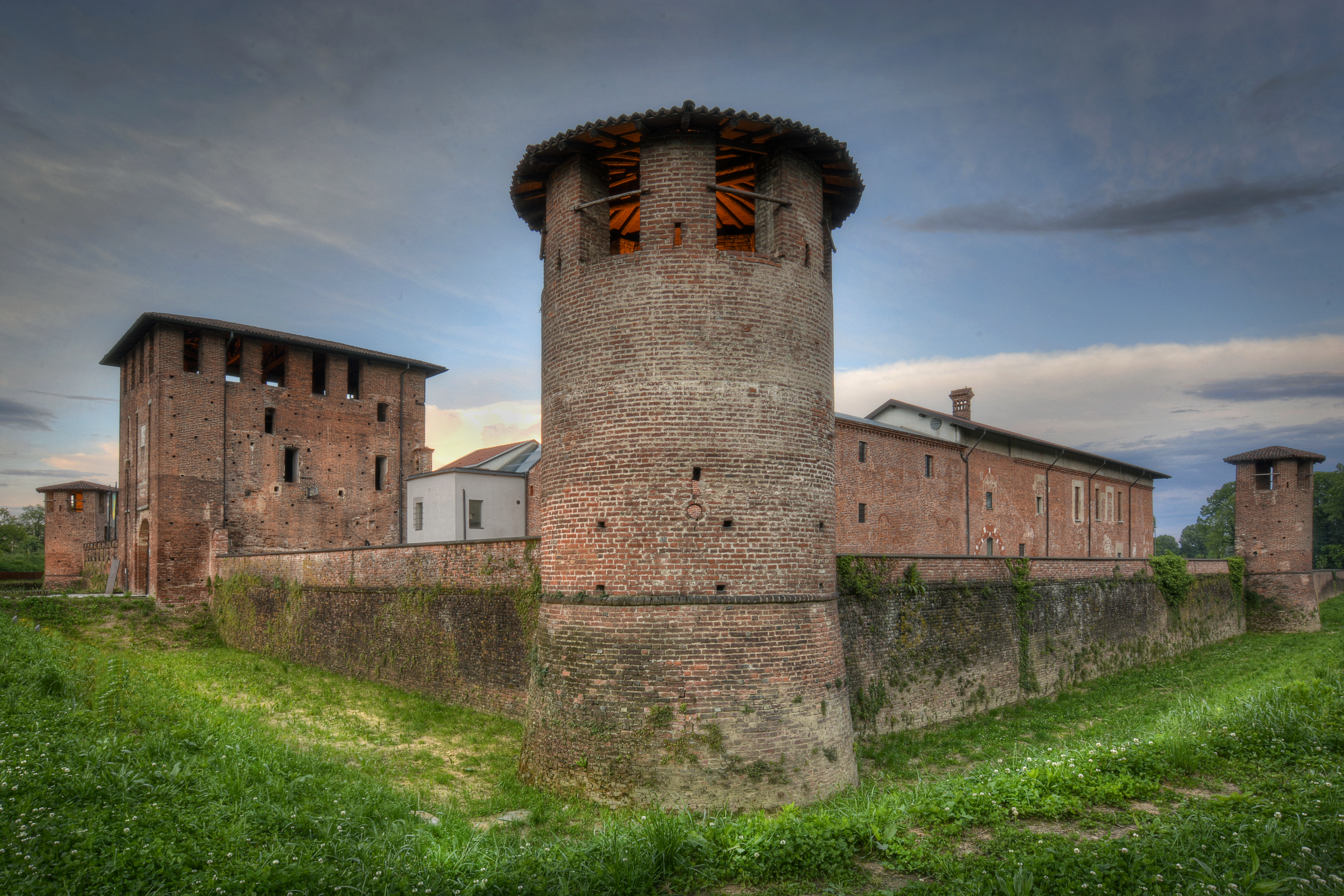
Castello Visconteo of Legnano.

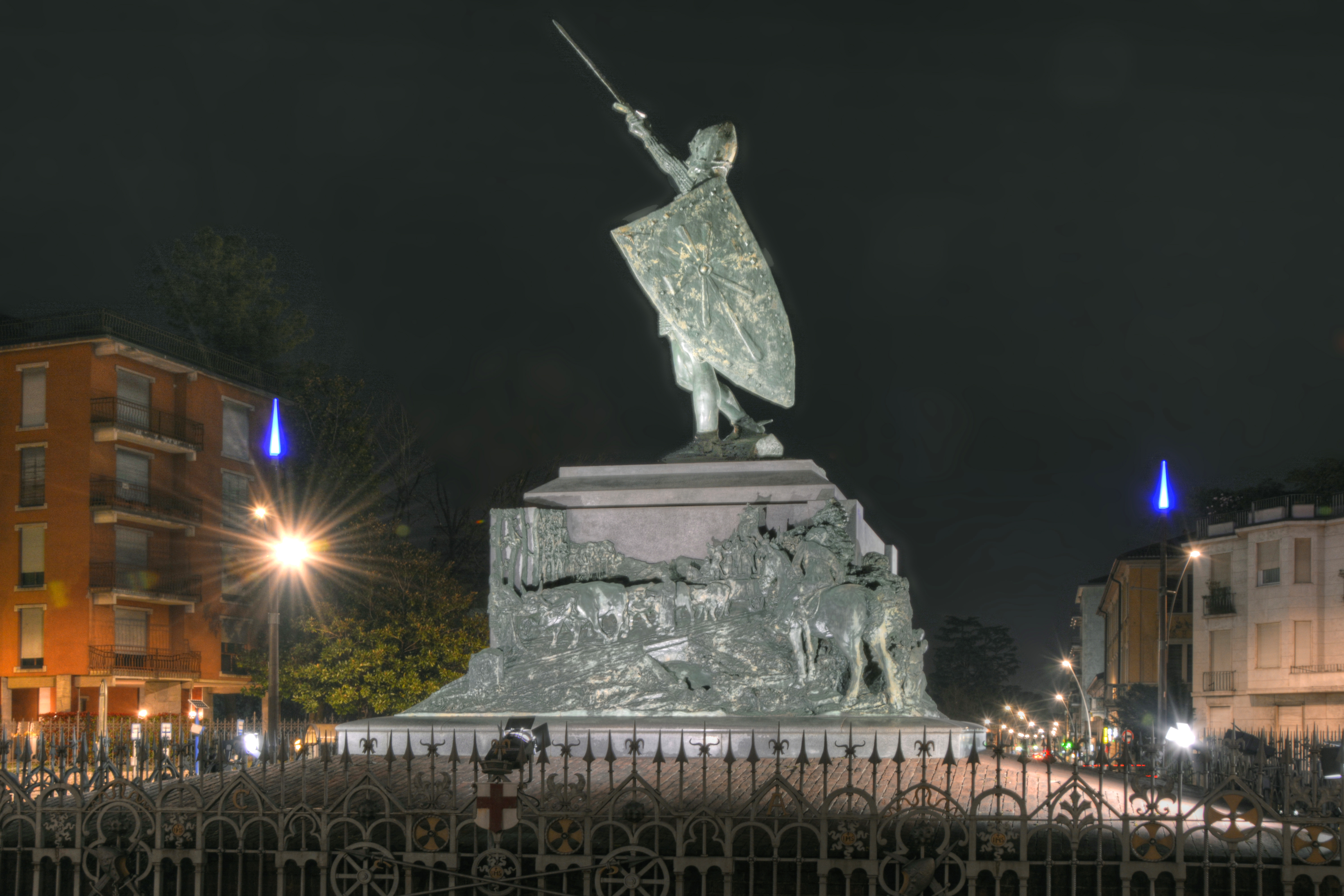
Monument to the Warrior of Legnano.

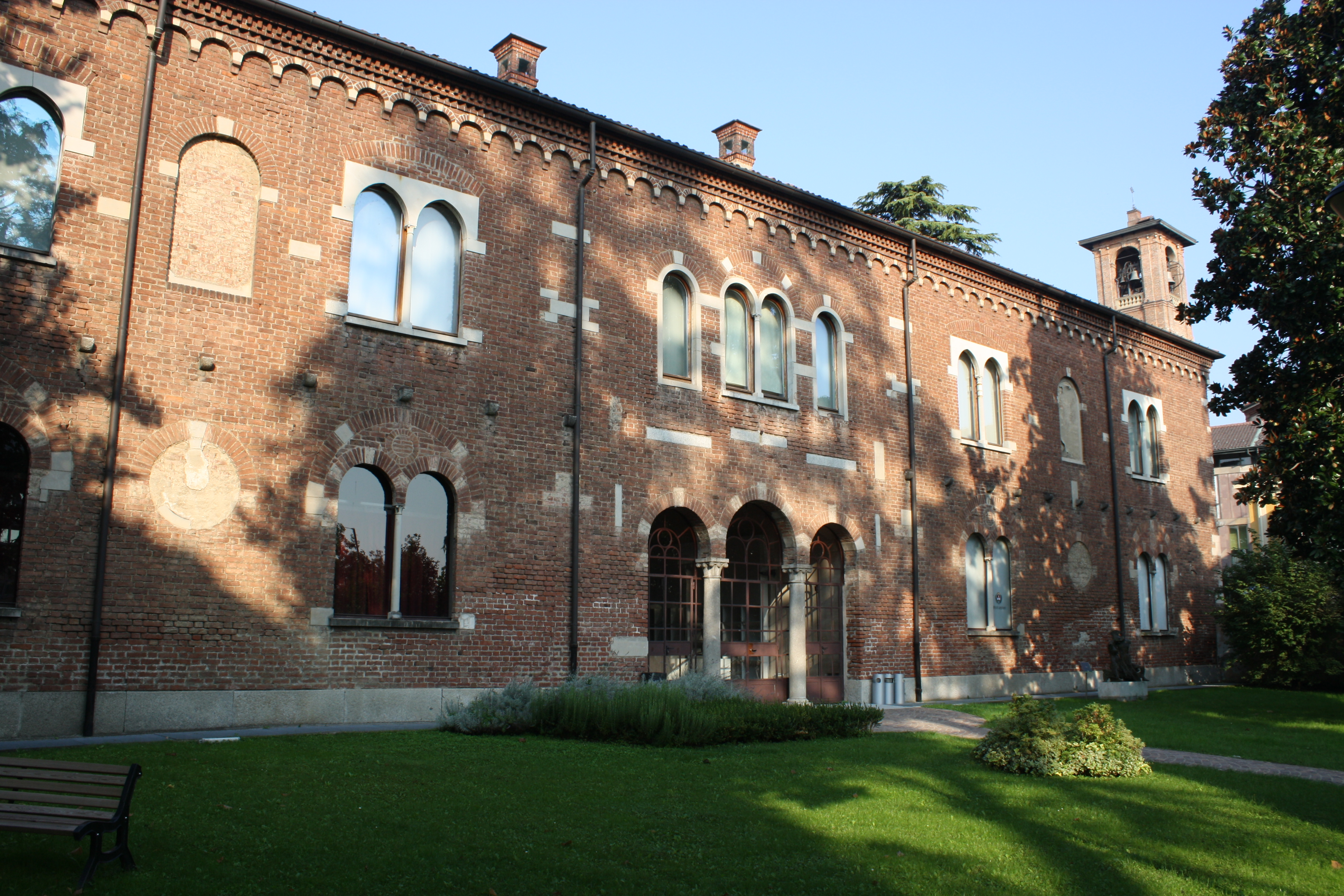
Palazzo Leone da Perego.

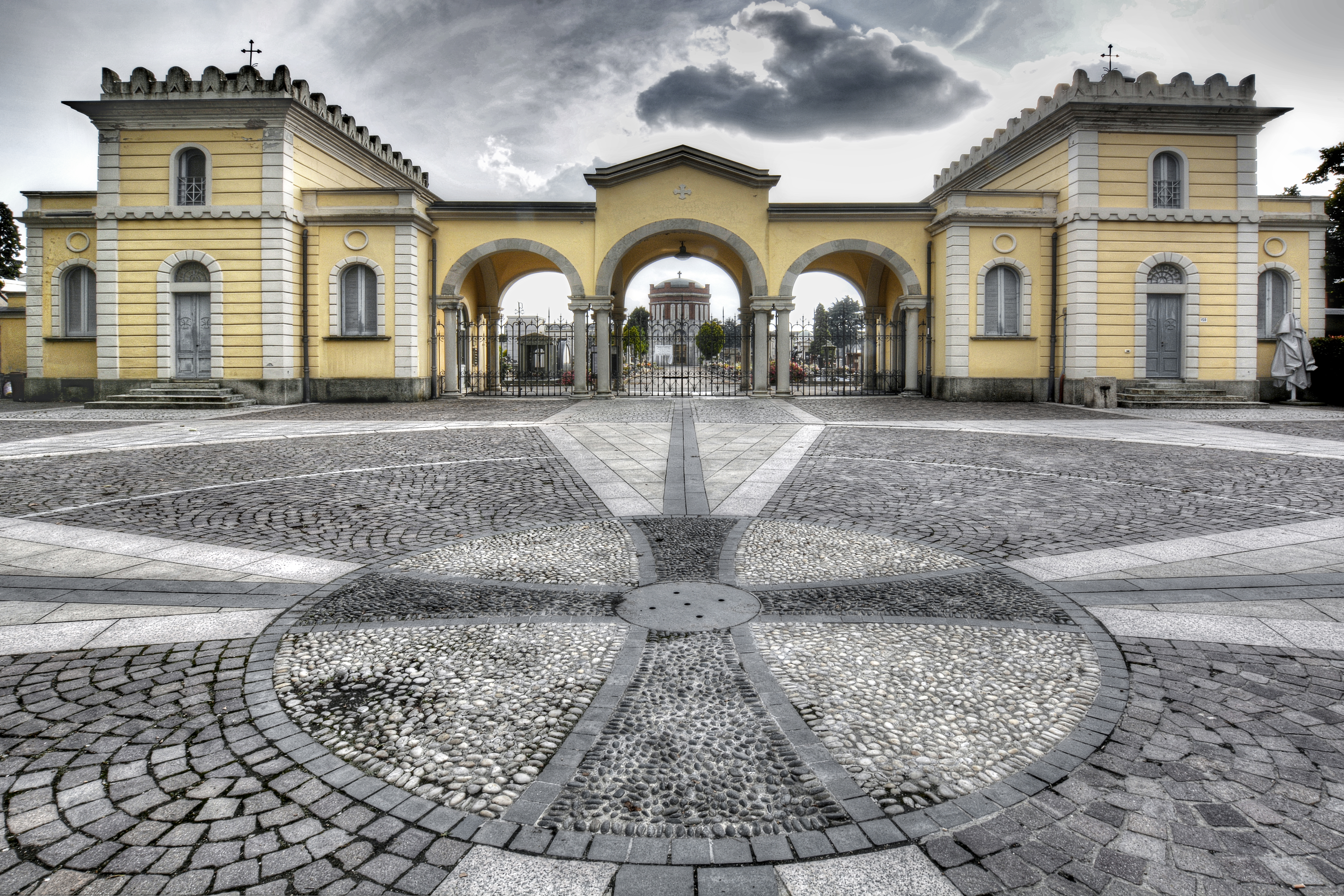
Cimitero monumentale di Legnano.

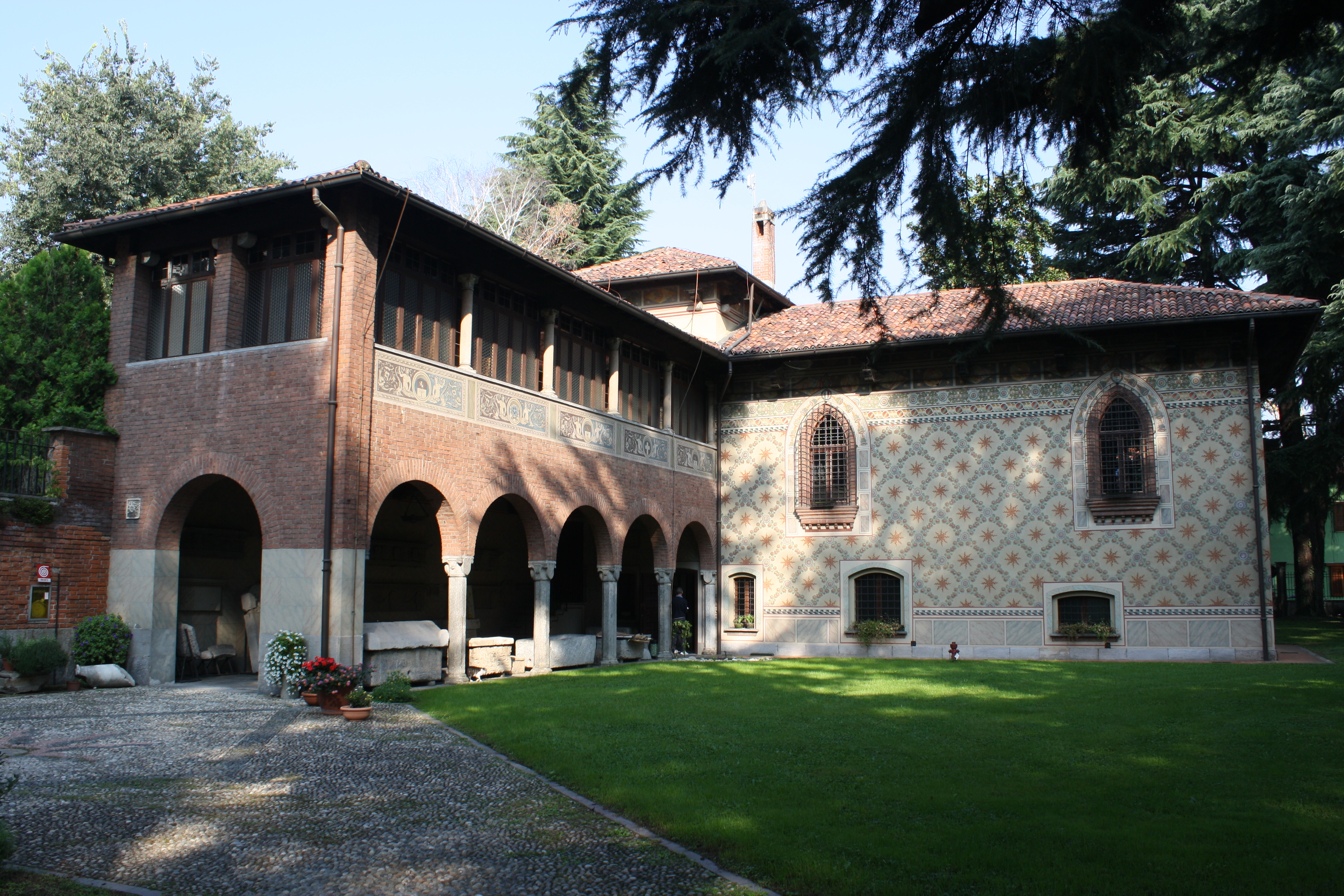
Museo civico Guido Sutermeister.

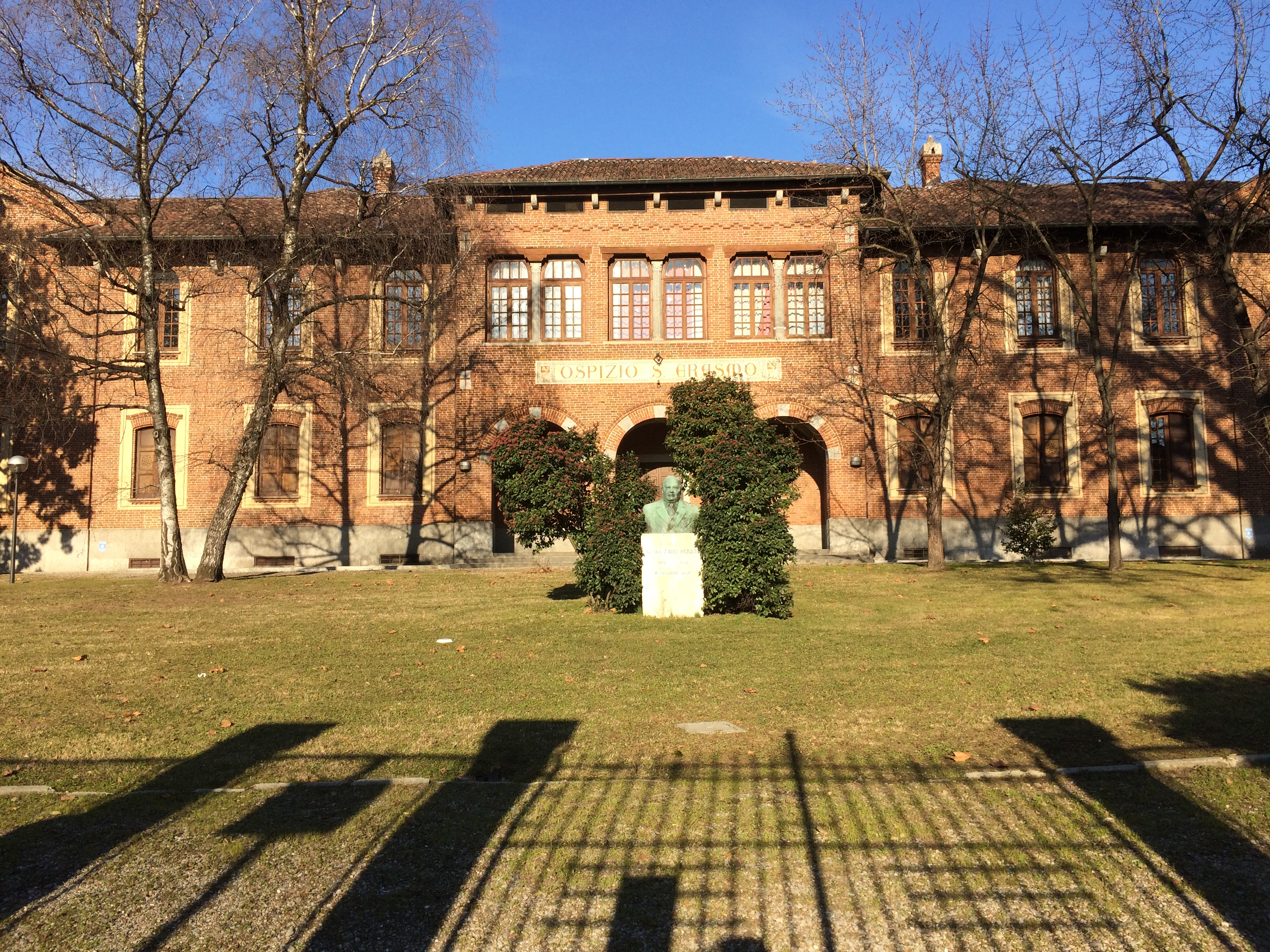
Ospizio Sant'Erasmo.

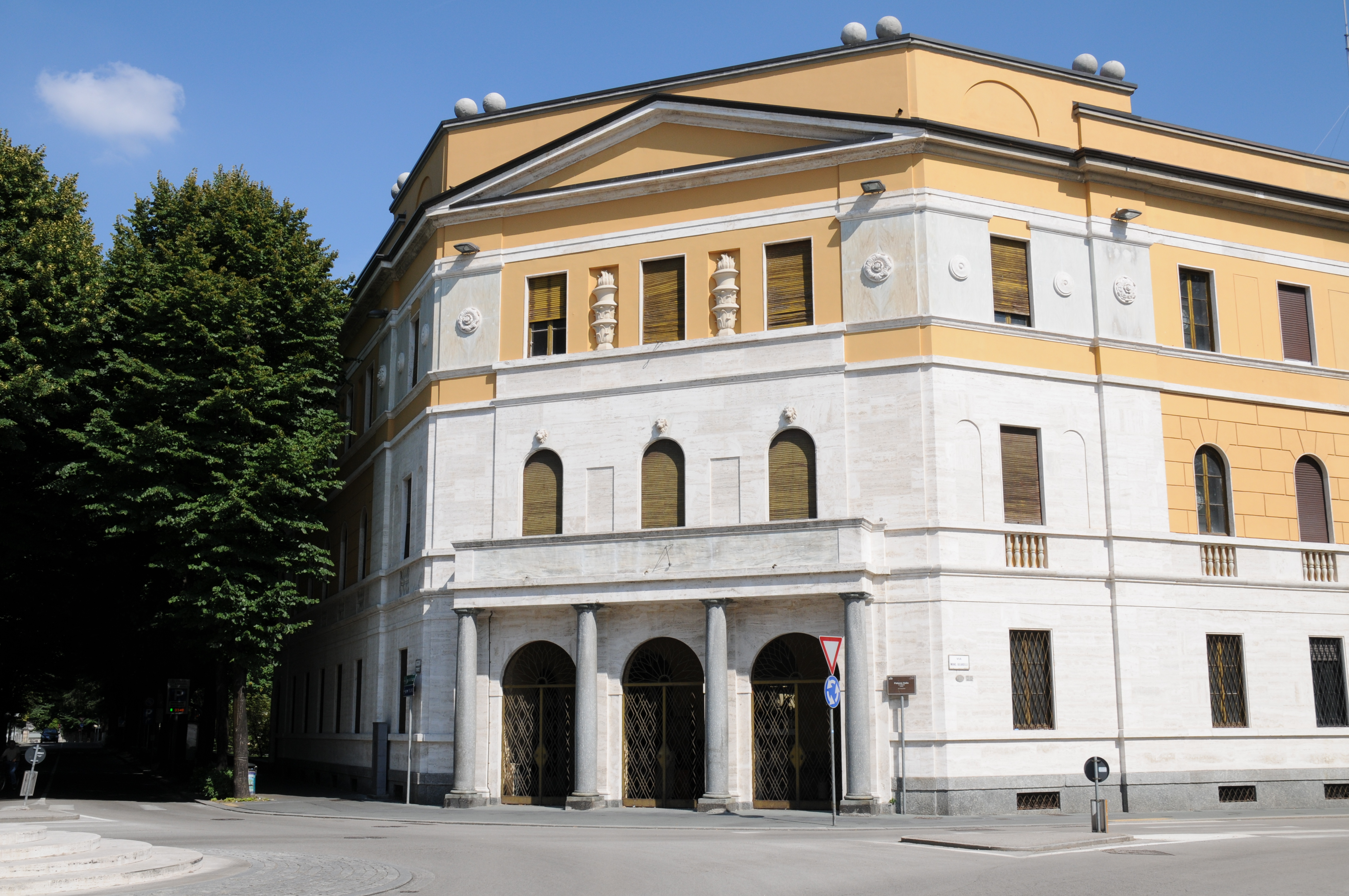
Palazzo Italia.

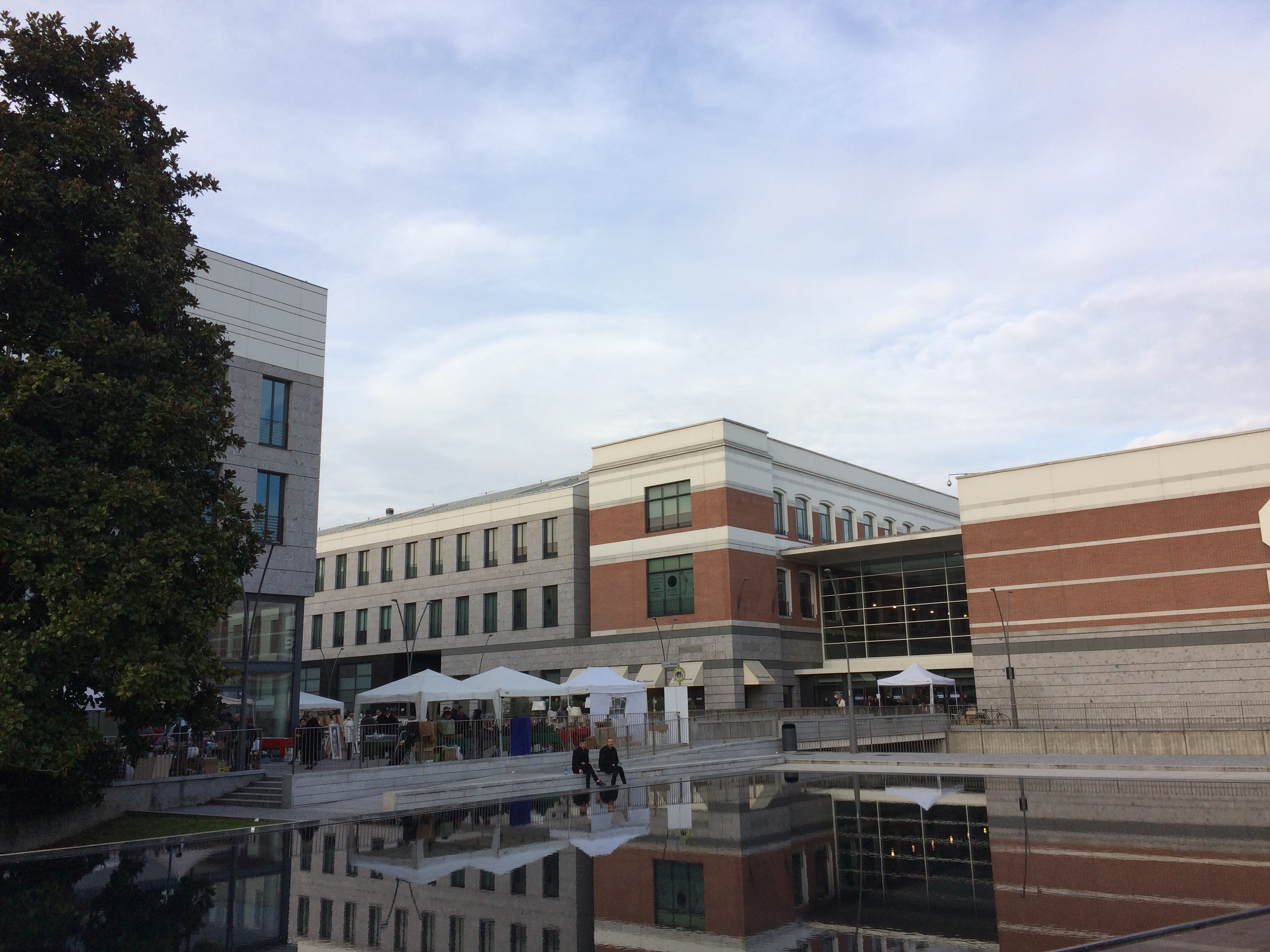
The "Gallerie Cantoni" shopping centre in Legnano, which is partly made from the former factories of the cotton mill of the same name.

- Basilica of San Magno. It is dedicated to the Saint Magnus, who was Archbishop of Milan from 518 to 530. The church was built from 1504 to 1513 in the Renaissance-style and likely design by Donato Bramante. The bell tower was added between the years 1752 and 1791. On 18 March 1950, Pope Pious XII named the Basilica of San Magno a minor basilica. The interior of the basilica church is adorned with numerous first-class examples of Lombard Renaissance artwork. Examples are Gian Giacomo Lampugnani's frescoes of the main vault, the remains of 16th century paintings by Evangelista Luini, the frescoes of the main chapel by Bernardino Lanini, and the altarpiece by Giampietrino. The item of greatest significance, however, is a polyptych by Bernardino Luini that is widely considered by art historians to be his masterpiece.
- Church of Sant'Ambrogio. It is the oldest church in the city. The chapel on which the church was built was dedicated to Saint Nazaro. It was later dedicated to Saint Ambrose, Archbishop of Milan between 374 and 397. The first quotation of a church dedicated to Saint Ambrose in Legnano is contained in a document of 1389 written by Geoffrey da Bussero.
- Santuario of Madonna delle Grazie. It was named after Our Lady of Graces in 1610 for a miracle against three deaf-mute boys. In the 16th-century where the miracle happened was built a chapel then enlarged in the Santuario of Madonna delle Grazie.
- Santuario of Santa Teresa del Bambin Gesù. It is a church-sanctuary of the Discalced Carmelites. Laying the first stone on 2 October 1931, it was consecrated on 13 September 1933 by cardinal Alfredo Ildefonso Schuster. He has been a parish priest since 1964. It is dedicated to Thérèse of Lisieux.
- Church of Sant'Erasmo. The history of the church of Sant'Erasmo is linked to the hospice probably founded by Bonvesin da la Riva, a 13th-century Lombard poet and writer. It was consecrated to Erasmus of Formia and opened to worship in 1490.
- Church of San Bernardino. It is dedicated to Bernardino of Siena. Consecrated in the 17th century, it was built on the ruins of an ancient oratory on the proposal of Carlo Borromeo. The first traces of documents date back to 1650.
- Church of Santa Rita. The first documented reports of the church of Santa Rita (or of the Purificazione, en. "of the Purification") date back to 1584, when cardinal Carlo Borromeo elevated it to a religious building of reference for the quartier of Legnanello. On 13 August 1898 cardinal Andrea Carlo Ferrari erected it as a parish priest, a function he had until 1902, when the new church of Santissimo Redentore was inaugurated. It is dedicated to Rita of Cascia
- Church of San Martino. Today's church of San Martino is from the 15th century, but a building with this name and dedicated to Martin of Tours was on the list left by the historian Geoffrey da Bussero, dated 1389. The church is therefore a refurbishment building of another much older one.
- Church of Madonnina dei Ronchi. It was built in 1641 after a descendant of Oldrado II Lampugnani gave permission to turn the family chapel into a church. It is located along strada statale del Sempione. It is dedicated to Mary, mother of Jesus.
- Church of Santa Maria Maddalena. It was built in 1728 to give to quartier of Ponzella a church. It was the religious landmark building of the community until 1975 when the church of San Giovanni Battista was consecrated. It is dedicated to Mary Magdalene.
- Church of Santi Magi. Dedicated to the Biblical Magi, it is a reference to the quartier of Olmina and its construction dates back to the early 18th century. It is located near farmhouses known in legnanese dialect as cascina dul Mina, named after changed in cascina Ulmina (it. "cascina Olmina").
- Church of Santa Teresa d'Ávila. Located in the quartier of Mazzafame, it was built between 1728 and 1779. It was built on small oratory (11 x 5.5 m). The exteriors are simple plaster to hide the stone mixed with the bricks. Worth mentioning is a wooden crucifix, the work of Tyrolean crafts from the early 1800s, preserved inside the church. There is also a processional crucifix, formerly used for rogations, which bears on the back the dates of the rites and the signatures of those who carried it in procession. It is dedicated to Teresa of Ávila.
- Church of Santissimo Redentore. It was inaugurated in 1902 in the quartier of Legnanello. Prior to this church, the ward religious community referred from 1603 to the small church of Santa Rita or of the Purificazione. It is dedicated to Christ the Redeemer.
- Church of San Domenico. The original idea had been to build a tannery on the area where the church is located. A priest opposed the plan and began work of church construction in April 1900. It was later dedicated to saint Dominic.
- Church of Santi Martiri. Completed in 1910 it became a parish church in 1912 and is dedicated to saints Sisinnius, Martyrius and Alexander, whose relics were kept in the basilica of San Simpliciano in Milan. For this reason is linked to Battle of Legnano (29 May 1176).

=== Cemetery ===
- Cimitero monumentale di Legnano. It is the most important cemetery in Legnano. It is located along corso Magenta, on the southern outskirts of the city, and was inaugurated in 1898 and had an initial surface area of 18,942 square meters. The monumental cemetery was expanded in 1907 to an area of 50,000 square meters.

Legnano is also equipped with a cemetery park, which is more recent construction and is located on the outskirts of the city in the modern quartier of San Paolo. Its construction was decided in the 1960s because the monumental cemetery had become insufficient for the needs of the community. It was inaugurated on 15 July 1979, and has an area of 60,000 square meters.

=== Civil architecture ===
- Castle Visconteo, Legnano. It was enlarged by the Della Torre in 13th century re-using a former convent. Later it was owned by the Lampugnani family. It is a medieval fortification located south of Legnano on a natural island of the Olona River. It is also known as Castle of Saint George (lat. Castrum Sancti Georgi) since the 13th century. The architectural complex is located along viale Toselli, between the Parco castello and piazza I Maggio. In 1277 the building passed to the Visconti remaining in their possessions until 1437 when it passed to the Lampugnani. In 1798 the castle was purchased by the Cornaggia family. The purchase process by comune of Legnano ended in 1973, with the acquisition of the castle, the watermill Cornaggia and 240,000 square meters of surrounding land.
- Monument to the Warrior of Legnano. It is a bronze statue dedicated to a fighter of the medieval battle of Legnano. Located in the piazza Monumento, the statue depicts a soldier in a pose that later became famous, with the shield in his left hand and the sword raised in his right so as to symbolize the jubilation for the end of the Battle of Legnano and for the defeat of Federico Barbarossa. Built by Enrico Butti, it was inaugurated on 29 June 1900. It is often mistakenly attributed to Alberto da Giussano.
- Palazzo Leone da Perego. It is a historic building in Legnano. It was rebuilt in 1898 with some decorations from the former medieval building of the same name. Located a short walk from basilica of San Magno, it has two entrances, one in corso Magenta and the other in via Girardelli. It is named after Leone da Perego, archbishop of Milan who died in Legnano in 1257. Together with Palazzo Visconti he forms the Corte Arcivescovile (en. "Archbishop's Court").
- Casa Corio. It is located in the quartier of Legnanello along strada statale del Sempione. Built in the 15th century, it has a long, all-round arched portie with columns, which is spread on two neighboring sides of the inner courtyard.
- Casa del Balilla. It was originally intended for Casa del Balilla, the home of Legnano of the Opera Nazionale Balilla, from which the name is derived. Originally named after Arnaldo Mussolini, duce's younger brother, it was inaugurated in December 1933 by the then President of the National Opera Balilla Renato Ricci.
- Colonia elioterapica. Designed by architecture firm BBPR and built in a few months between 1937 and 1938, it is one of the most important examples of Italian rationalism. The function of heliothematic colonies was the cure of childhood rickets which affected, according to some estimates at the time, about 10% of the population of schoolchildren
- Cotonificio Cantoni. It was Italy's largest cotton company for a long time. The original nucleus of the Cantoni cotton mill was a spinning house opened in 1828 in Legnano. In the mid-19th century, during the Second Industrial Revolution, the artisanal business became a modern industry. The two most important facades architecturally (actually the only ones not yet demolished), those of the velvet department of the 1931 overlooking strada statale del Sempione, have been preserved and are an integral part of the new commercial buildings. The rest of the complex, including other architecturally interesting buildings, was demolished.
- Galleria di Legnano. It is a covered passageway inserted into a building, connecting piazza San Magno with via XXV Aprile. It is located in the city center. This covered passage is located within a building that was built by the INA in 1954 after the demolition of a monastery dating back before the year 1398, the convent of the Humiliated, and which was renovated in 1991. In Galleria di Legnano is located the Gallery Theatre.
- La Colombera. It is the only building of Legnano that has come to us from 15th century. It is incorporated in a Lombard court that stands between corso Garibaldi and via Del Gigante, near the church of San Domenico. Also known as La Colombera, it owes its name to one of the uses that in the past were often carried out in similar structures, namely the breeding of pigeons (in Italian, "colombi").
- Museo civico Guido Sutermeister. It is an archaeological museum named after the archaeologist Guido Sutermeister, who wanted to be founded. It was staged in 1929 thanks to the will of Guido Sutermeister, who did a major archaeological research on the territory between 1925 and 1964. The collections were then enriched with material that came to the museum from excavations of the Archaeological Superintendent of Lombardy and donations from private individuals.
- Ospedale civile di Legnano. The first pavilion of the hospital in Legnano was built in 1903 in via Candiani thanks to the contribution of the citizens of Legnano, with the local industrialists who played a leading role. During the 20th century, the nosocomio lumina, which was a lumberjack, expanded several times. The old pavilions have been replaced by the new hospital, which is located in via Papa Giovanni Paolo II in Legnano and which was inaugurated on 4 February 2010.
- Ospizio Sant'Erasmo. The original hospice, which was built between the 13th and 14th centuries, was demolished in 1926. It was replaced in 1927 by a modern building with the same function and name. It stands next to the church of the same name, the church of Sant'Erasmo.
- Palazzo Italia. The building was built in 1929 in Novecento Italiano style. It was originally destined for the Casa del Fascio and then, until the fall of the Fascist regime in Italy, was home to the Legnano Fighting Band of the National Fascist Party. After the end of World War II, he was partly assigned to command the State police.
- Palazzo Malinverni. It is home to the city hall. It is located in the central piazza San Magno next to the basilica of the same name and was inaugurated on 28 November 1909 during the period of the city's greatest – industrial and demographic – growth. It has a medieval style with exposed brick and bifore to which are added parts that recall other architectural styles such as Liberty and the neo-Renaissance. The upper cornice is decorated with the coats of arms of the municipalities that were part of the Lombard League and with those of the Italian provincial capitals, including the coats of arms of Pula, Rijeka and Zadar, which belonged to Italy between the two world wars.
- Sanatorio regina Elena. It is a former sanatorium located in Legnano, which finished its original function of tuberculosis treatment in 1970. Later part of the building became a socio-educational centre for the physically and mentally disabled and home to some voluntary associations, as well as the headquarters of part of the offices of the local Azienda sanitaria locale. The ex-ILA park is also part of the structure once earmarked for sanatorium
- Stadio Giovanni Mari. It is a multi-use stadium in Legnano. It is currently used mostly for football matches and is the home ground of A.C. Legnano. The stadium holds 5,000 people. It is also used for the horse race of Palio di Legnano. On 2 July 1994 the Giovanni Mari stadium hosted the 14th Italian Superbowl, won by the Frogs Legnano over the Rhinos Milano 37 to 27, thanks to which the Frogs won their fifth scudetto.
- Teatro città di Legnano. It is a theatre in Legnano that is dedicated to Talisio Tirinnanzi, a well-deserved citizen of the city. Construction work on the building complex that houses the theatre lasted from 1928 to 1929. The building continued to be used as a theatre and cinema until 2002, when it closed its doors. The theatre reopened on 31 March 2016.
- Villa Bernocchi. It is a historic building in Legnano located in via Cavour, houses the municipal library, which was later named after Augusto Marinoni. The building was built in the early 20th century. It was originally inhabited by Antonio Bernocchi, owner of the cotton mill of the same name.
- Villa Dell'Acqua-Lazzati-Bombelli. The building, located in the center of the city in via Lampugnani, on the left bank of the river Olona, is a classic example of a manor villa of the early 20th century. Built in 1904, it was originally inhabited by the Dell'Acqua brothers, the founders of the cotton mill of the same name.
- Villa Jucker. The building complex was built from 1905 to 1906. Villa Jucker was originally home to the eponymous family of executives who operated in the adjacent Cantoni Cotonificio, textile company active from 1828 to 2004. The building, located in the center of the city in via Matteotti, on the right bank of the river Olona, is a classic example of a manor villa of the early 20th century. Since 1976 it is home to the Legnanese Family Association.

=== Natural areas ===
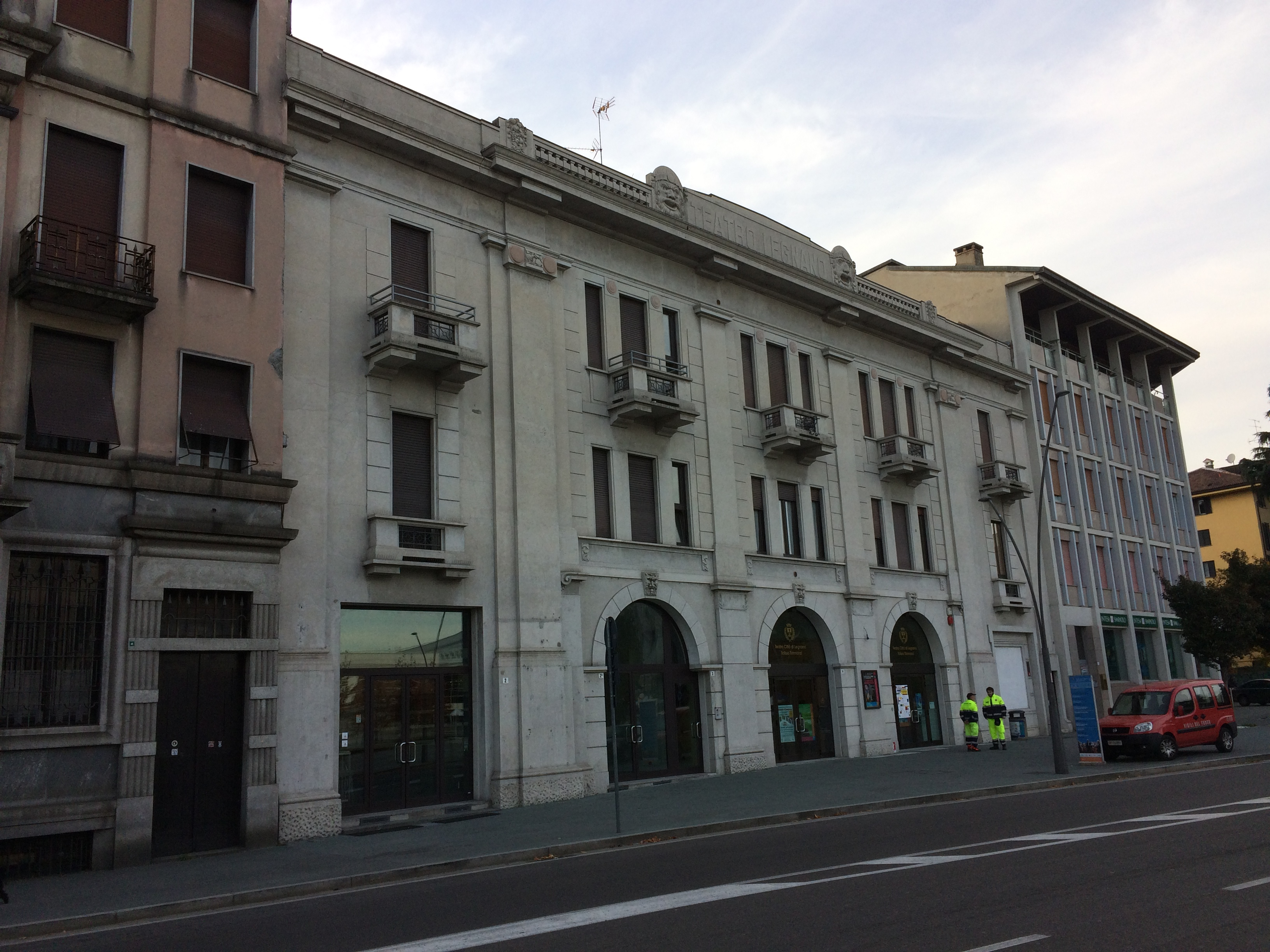
In the center of the image, the Teatro città di Legnano.

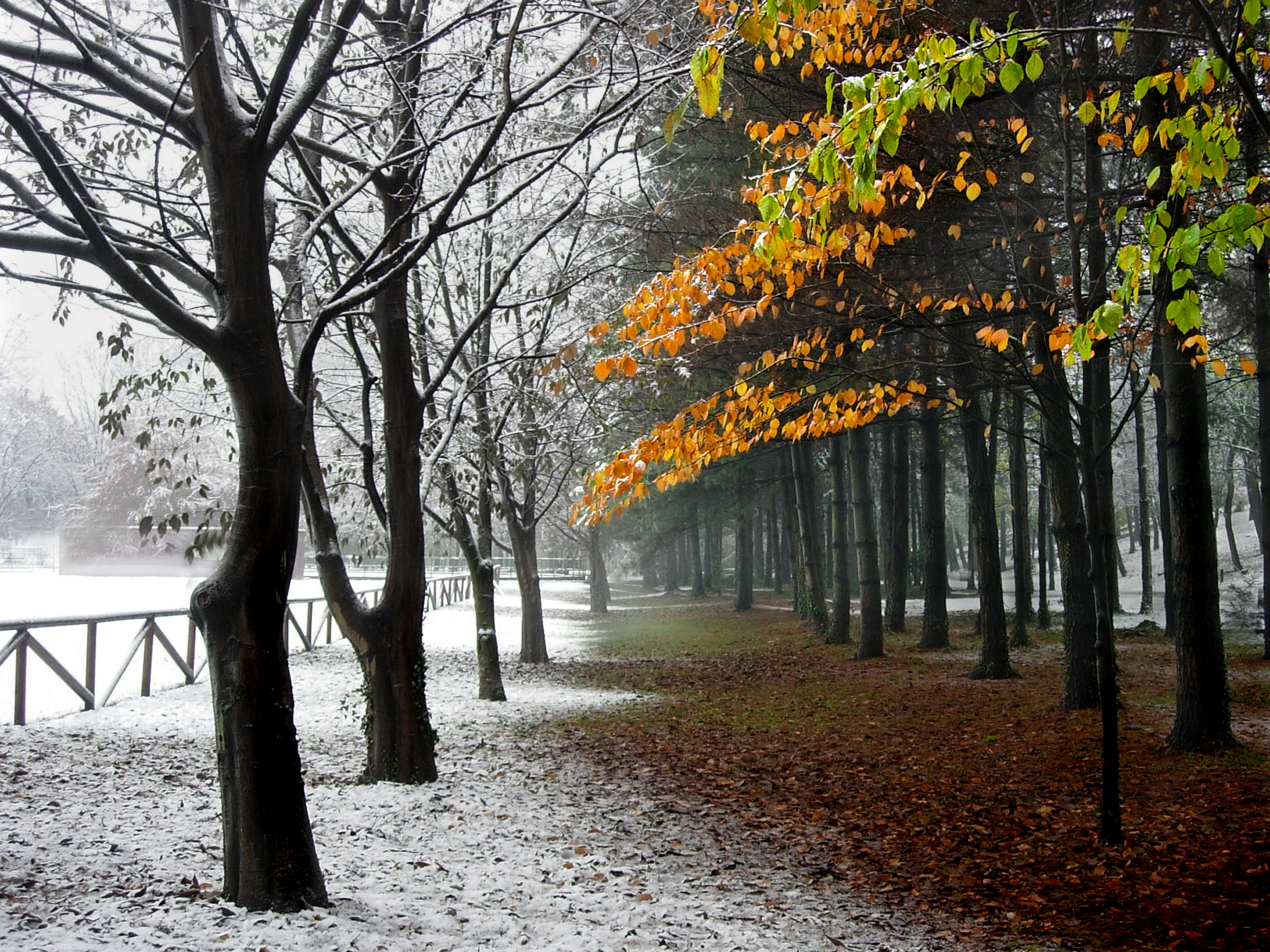
Parco castello.

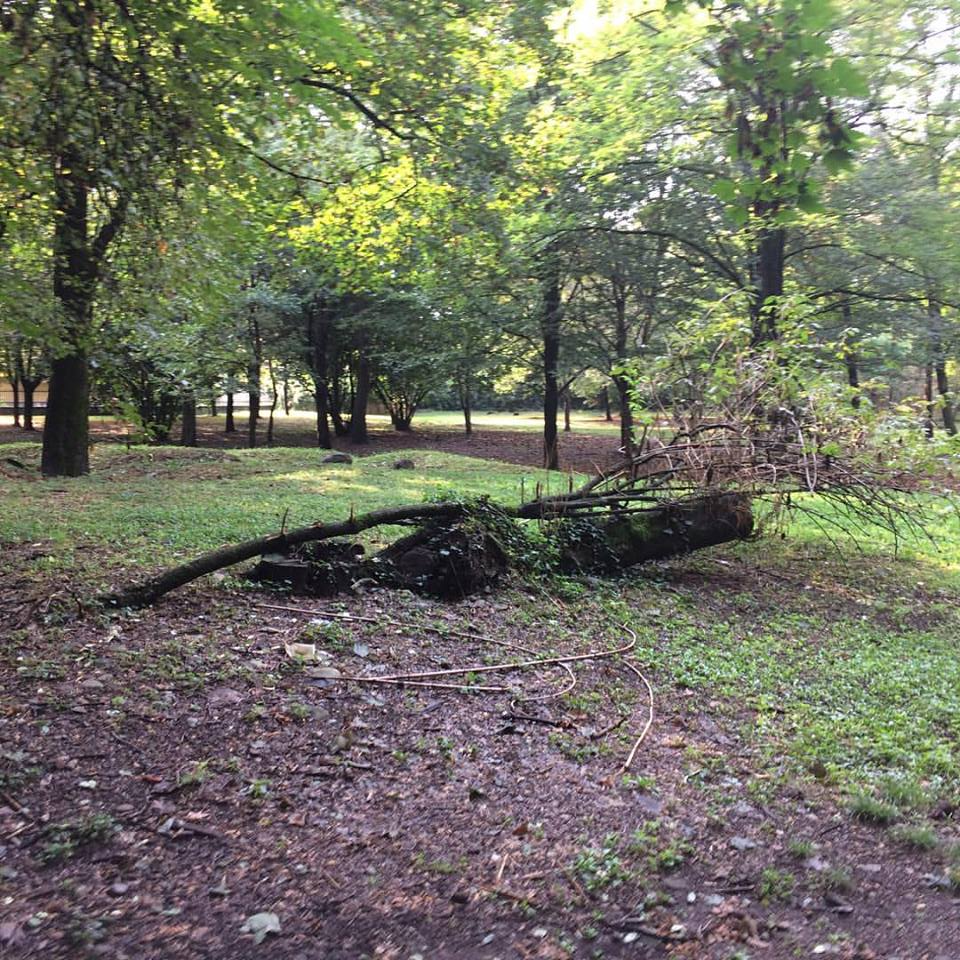
Parco Bosco dei Ronchi.

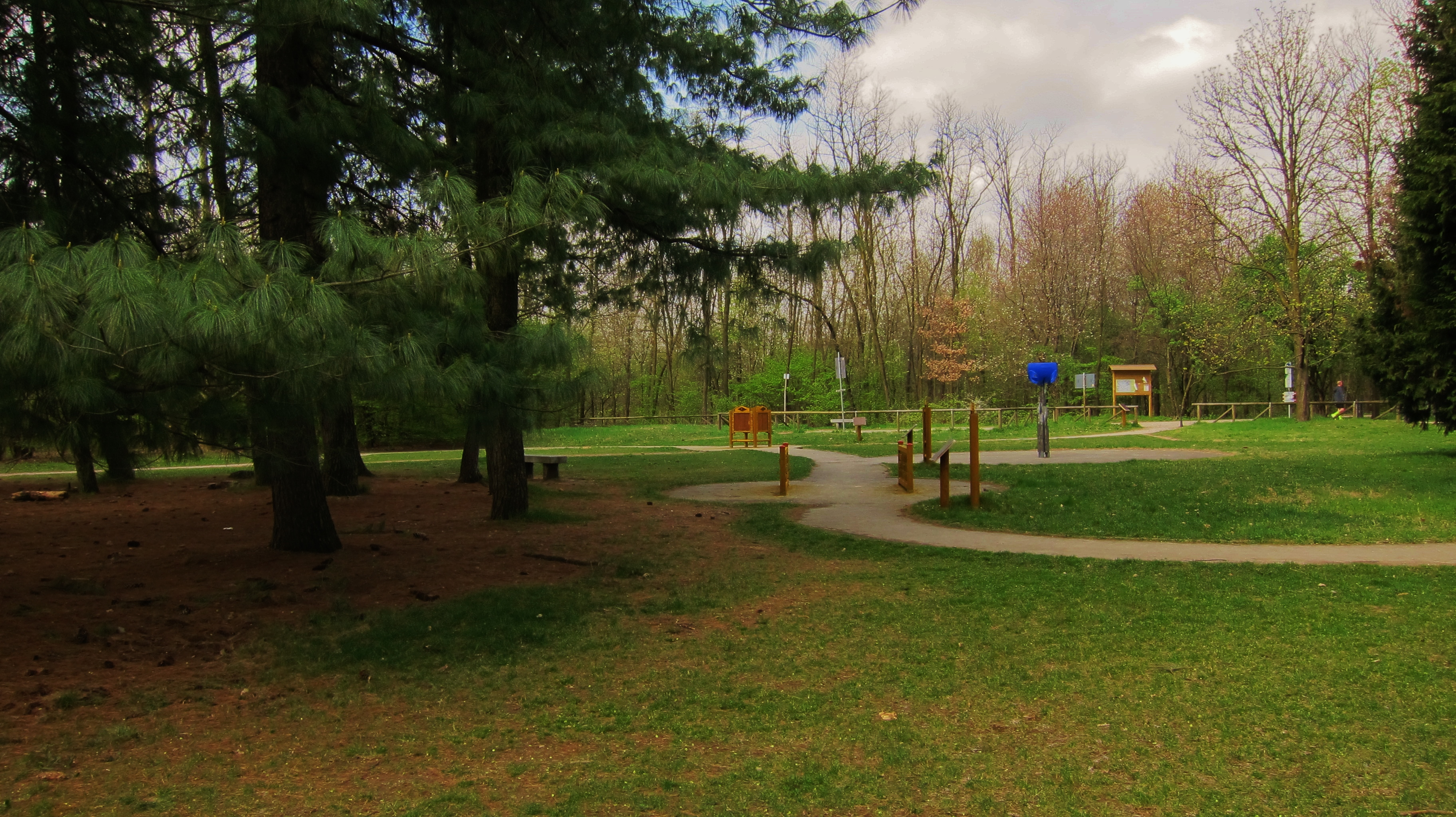
Parco Alto Milanese.

- Parco castello. It is a local park that develops around the Olona. It has an area of about 25 hectares and extends entirely over the territory of the comune of Legnano. Located on the edge of the city, it borders the municipalities of Canegrate and San Vittore Olona and extends around the Visconti Castle of Legnano. Established in 1976 as a local park of super-communal interest, since 2008 it is part of the Park of the Mills, a park of super-communal interest that extends for about 500 hectares.
- Parco Bosco dei Ronchi e Parco ex-ILA. The two parks are not adjacent but are located a short distance away. The Parco ex-ILA and the Parco Bosco dei Ronchi are part of a single urban protected area established by the decision of City Council in 1992. The Parco Bosco dei Ronchi extends entirely within the city limits and is not enclosed by any fence. This allows free access by citizens. The boundaries of the ex-ILA Park are delimited by a belt enclosing the entire perimeter of sanatorio Regina Elena. The access of the ex-ILA Park is opened to the citizenship every weekend.
- Parco Alto Milanese. It is recognized by the Lombardy Region with deliberation of 27 October 1987 on the proposal of the three municipalities concerned. The area covers about 360 hectares, of which about 178 on the comune of Legnano, 126 on the comune of Busto Arsizio and 53 hectares on the comune of Castellanza. The borders are bounded by the peripheries of the three municipalities and include a large area with a predominantly agricultural vocation.

== Demographics ==
Historical population
Year	Pop.	±%
1861	6,501	—
1871	6,949	+6.9%
1881	8,098	+16.5%
1901	18,364	+126.8%
1911	25,087	+36.6%
1921	27,218	+8.5%
1931	29,556	+8.6%
1936	31,961	+8.1%
1951	38,014	+18.9%
1961	42,473	+11.7%
1971	47,736	+12.4%
1981	49,687	+4.1%
1991	50,018	+0.7%
2001	53,797	+7.6%
2011	57,647	+7.2%
Istat historical data 1861–2011

=== Ethnic groups ===
As of 31 December 2014, foreigners living in Legnano with regular residence permits (ISTAT data) amounted to 7,236 corresponding about 12% of the total population. Over the years, there has been a steady increase in the number of foreigners in 2005 with residence permits living in Legnano amounting to 3,451 corresponding to 6.1% of the total population. The ten most represented nationalities as of 31 December 2014 were (ISTAT data):

1. Albania, 1,508
2. Marocco, 576
3. Ecuador, 553
4. Romania, 546
5. Perù, 509
6. China, 474
7. Pakistan, 348
8. Ukraine, 276
9. Bangladesh, 266
10. Senegal, 247

=== Religion ===
The patron saint of Legnano is Saint Magno, archbishop of Milan from 518 to 530, whose anniversary is celebrated on 5 November. The majority of the population is Catholic Church. The immigration of EU and non-EU citizens has led to the establishment of large Orthodox, Muslims and Christian minorities. There is also a small Presbyterian community in the city.

There are nine Catholic parishes in the municipality that belong to the Roman Catholic Archdiocese of Milan. The oldest parish churches are San Magno and Sant'Ambrogio. The church of Madonnina dei Ronchi is one of the few churches of the archdiocese of Milan where masses are celebrated in the ancient Ambrosian Rite, that is officiated in the Latin language.

== Transportation ==
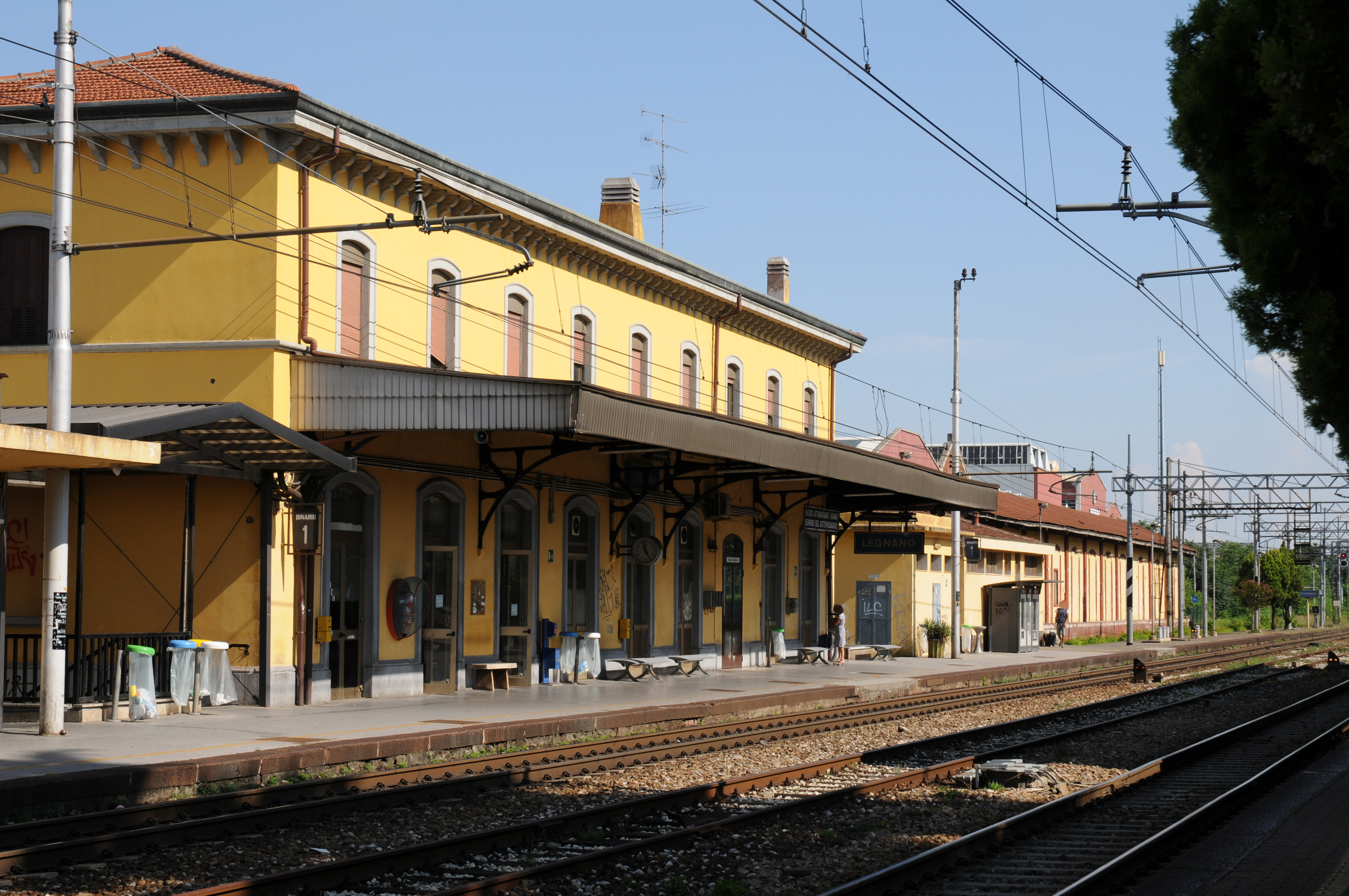
Legnano railway station.

The town is served by Legnano railway station. Located on the common section of the lines Domodossola–Milan, Luino–Milan and Porto Ceresio–Milan, it serves the city of Legnano. Legnano is served by the line S5 of the Milan suburban railway network and by the regional line Milan–Varese. Between 1880 and 1966 the city was also served by the Milan-Gallarate tramway, an infrastructure managed by STIE.

Legnano has an exit along the Highway of the Lakes, is crossed by two state roads (strada statale 33 del Sempione and strada statale 527 Bustese) and is crossed by the provincial road SP12 Legnano-Inveruno. Legnano is connected with Milan and the neighboring municipalities by several long-distance bus routes operated by the companies MOVIBUS and FNM Autoservices.

== Economy ==
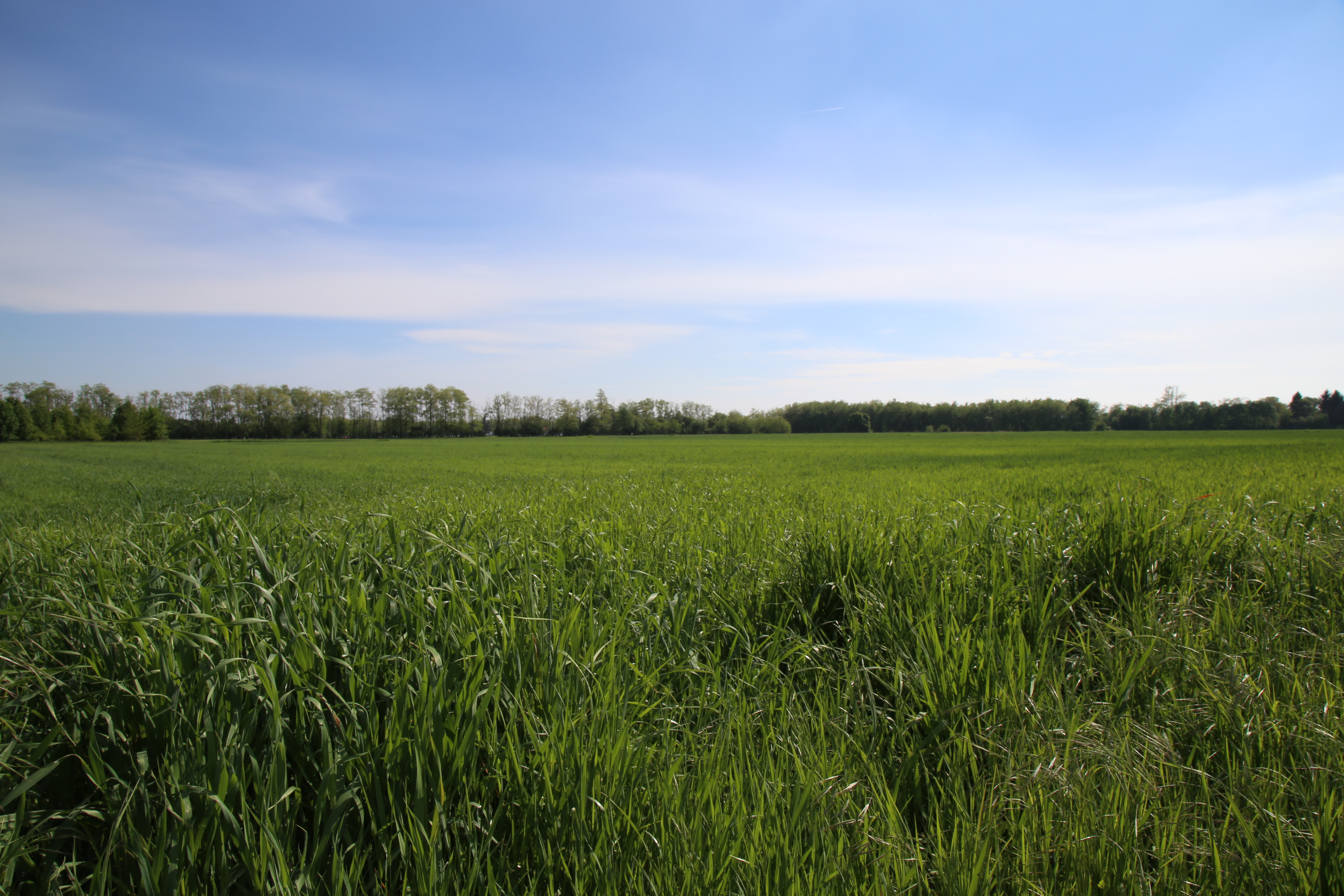
Agricultural area near the legnanese quartier of Mazzafame.

Agriculture of Legnano has been the basis of the economic development of the territory. First, it was affected by the process of mechanization and restructuring. Mechanization, thanks to the use of increasingly complex machinery, has led to an increase in agricultural production. In the 21st century it is no longer an important activity for the timber economy. The few areas free of construction and infrastructure are grown from cereals, mainly wheat and maize.

The golden age of Legnano's industry began at the beginning of the 20th century and ended in the 1960s. The crisis progressively worsened, damaging the economy, employment and the industrial fabric. Many companies closed, especially in textiles, clothing and footwear, and many others were involved in a downsizing process. Between the 1980s and the 1990s there was a real phenomenon of deindustrialization of the territory, which was not accompanied by the birth of new activities.

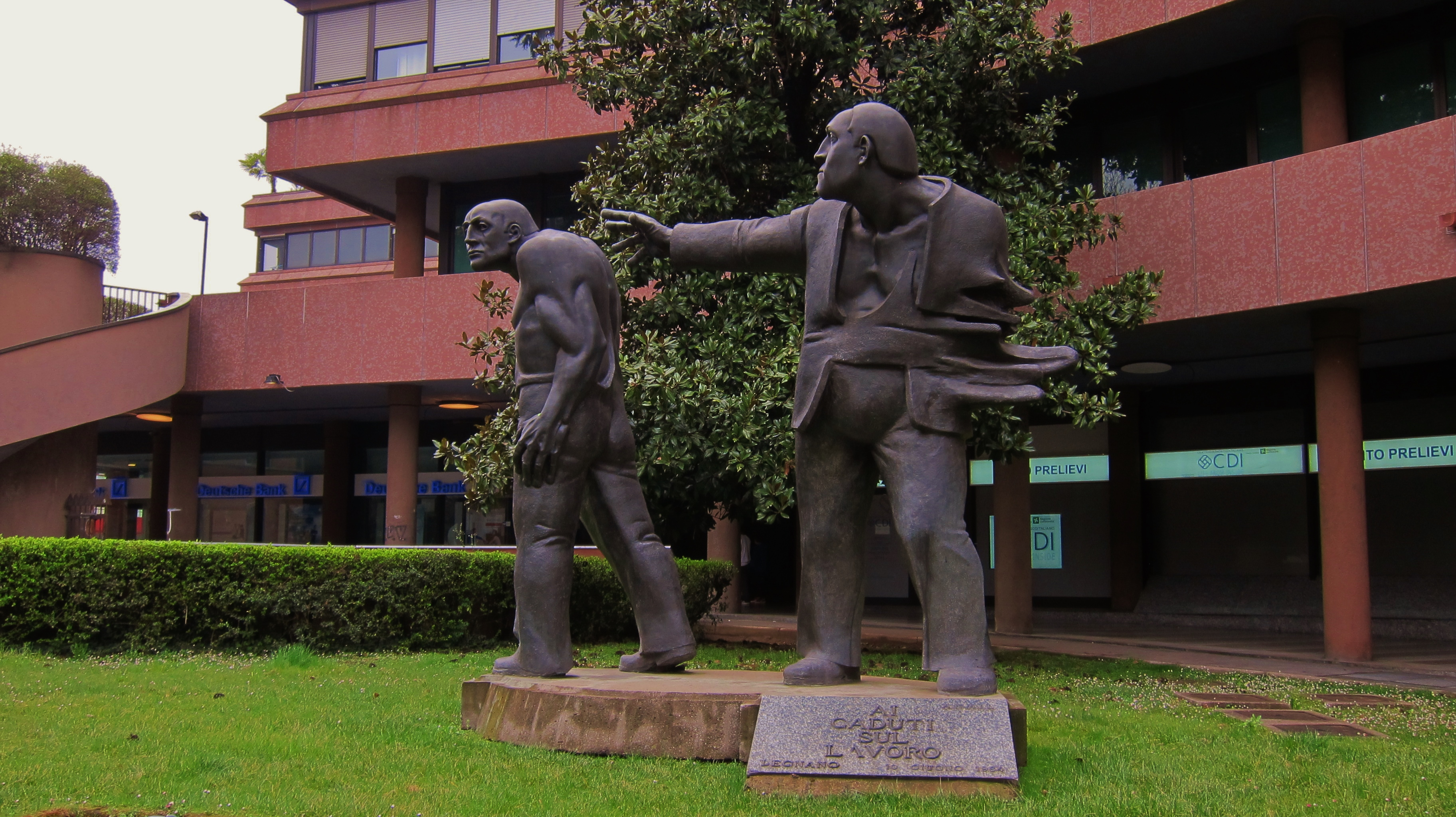
Monumento ai Caduti sul lavoro di Gianluigi Bennati

Attempts have therefore been made to target the tertiary sector. In 1977 in Legnano was founded Antenna 3 Lombardia that was, that time the most important private TV station in Italy. However, these alternative fields did not lead to a sufficient rate of development to make up for the closure of industrial activities. It began at a time when the number of small businesses grew considerably. These processes continue to this day.

The municipality was home to the Banca di Legnano, a regional lender. Founded on 11 June 1887, on 14 September 2013 it merged with Banca Popolare di Milano. In 2008 it had 846 employees employed in 119 branches, mostly located in Lombardy.

== Institutions and associations ==
Villa Jucker, home of the association Famiglia Legnanese.

The city has the following public institutions:

- Decentralized office of the Lombardy Region
- Decentralized office of the Metropolitan City of Milan
- INPS headquarters
- INAIL headquarters

On 4 February 2010 the new hospital was inaugurated, located in the area of via Novara, which replaced the previous nosocomium of strada statale del Sempione.

The non-profit cultural association Famiglia Legnanese, which is based in the historic Villa Jucker, is active in the municipality. One of the first and most important achievements of the association was to restore, from May 1952, the Palio di Legnano. In fact, this event, created in 1935, had been interrupted after the 1939 edition because of the World War II events.

In Legnano is home to the Società arte e storia, a cultural association that deals with the dissemination and promotion of the history and art of Legnano and which was founded in 1927 by Guido Sutermeister, who wanted the museum of city too, Museo civico Guido Sutermeister.

== Culture ==
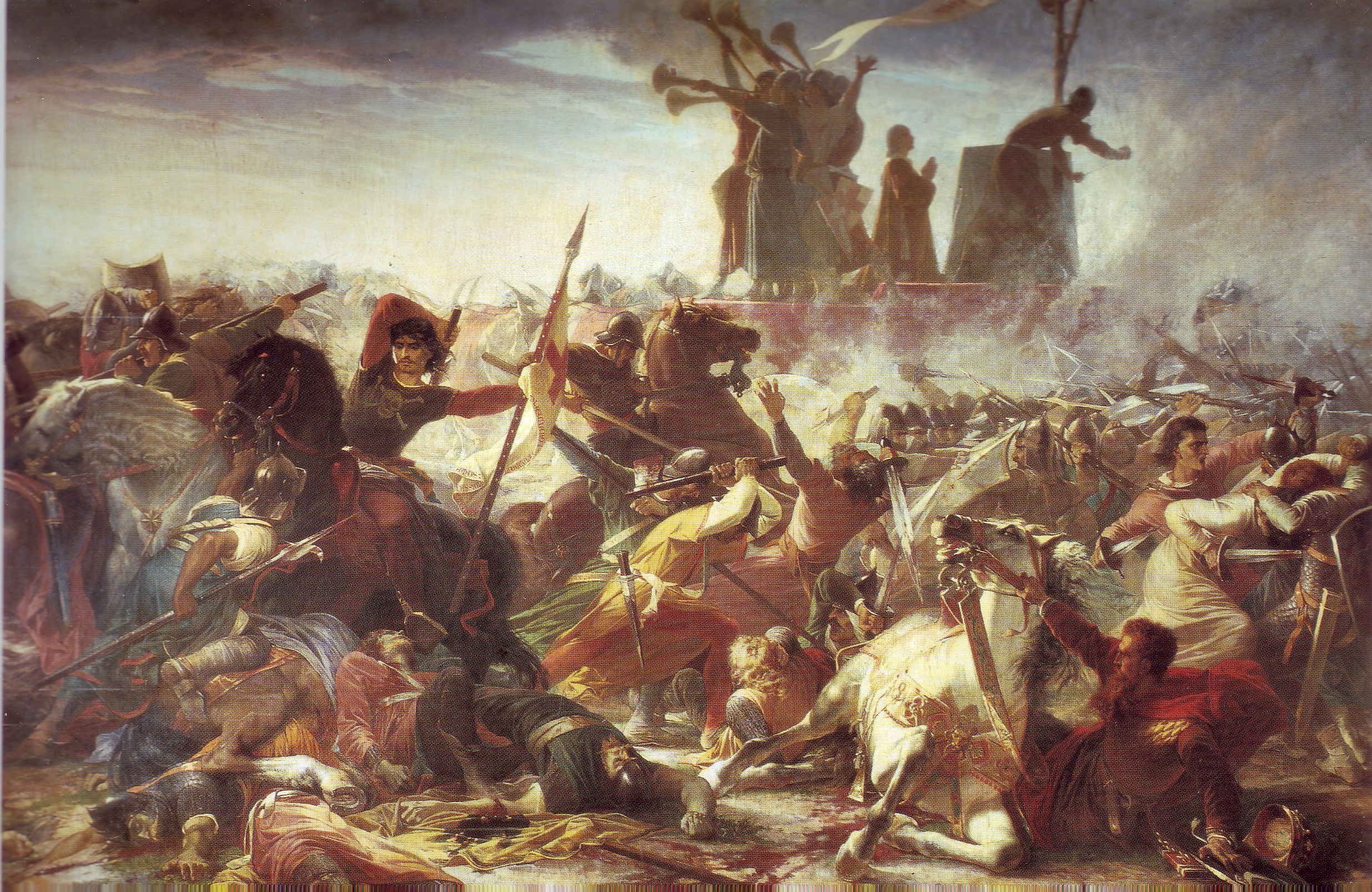
The Battaglia di Legnano (en. Battle of Legnano) by Amos Cassioli (1860), a painting preserved at the Gallery of Modern Art at Palazzo Pitti in Florence.

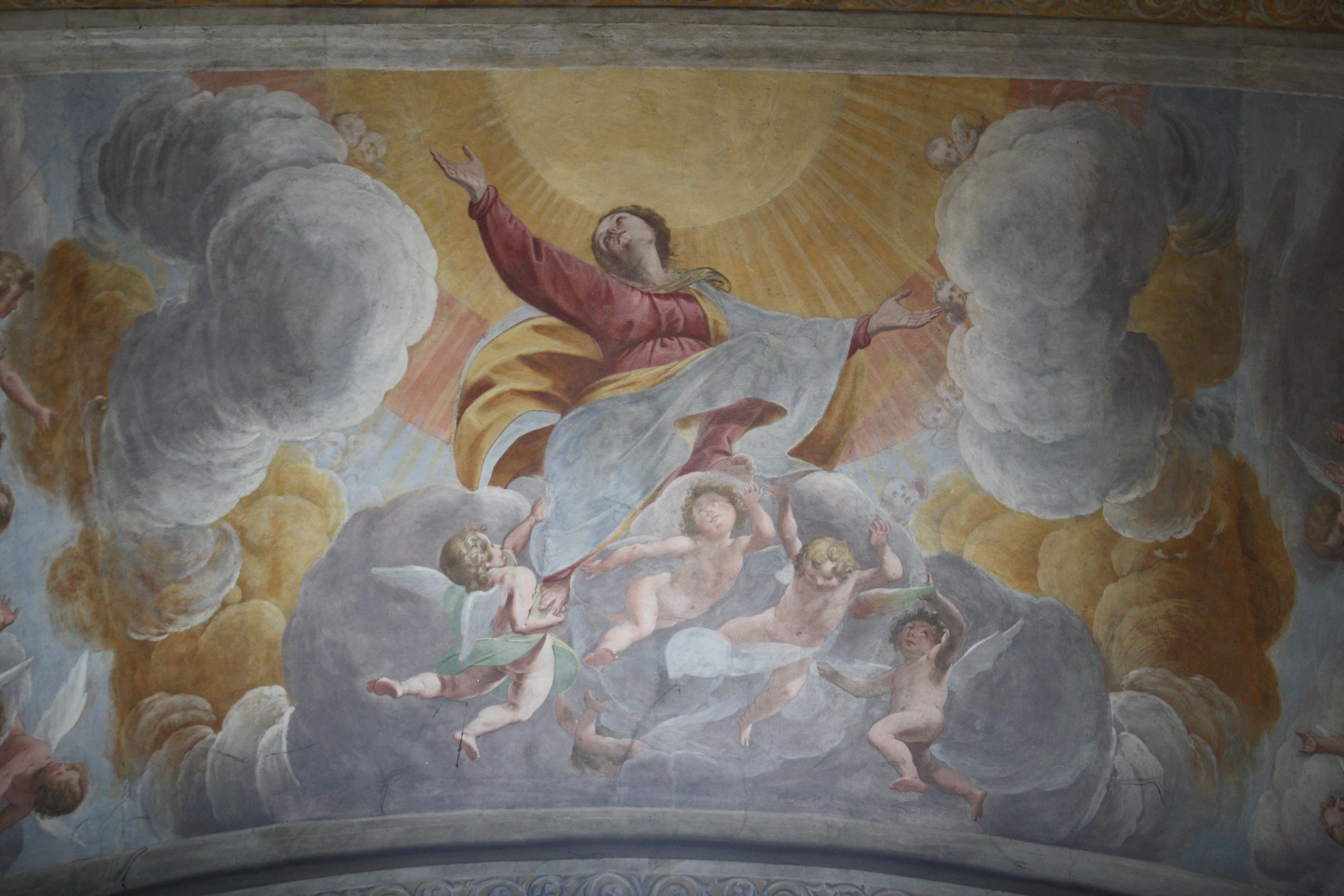
A 17th-century fresco by Francesco e Giovanni Battista Lampugnani decorated the basilica of San Magno and depicting the Assumption of Mary.

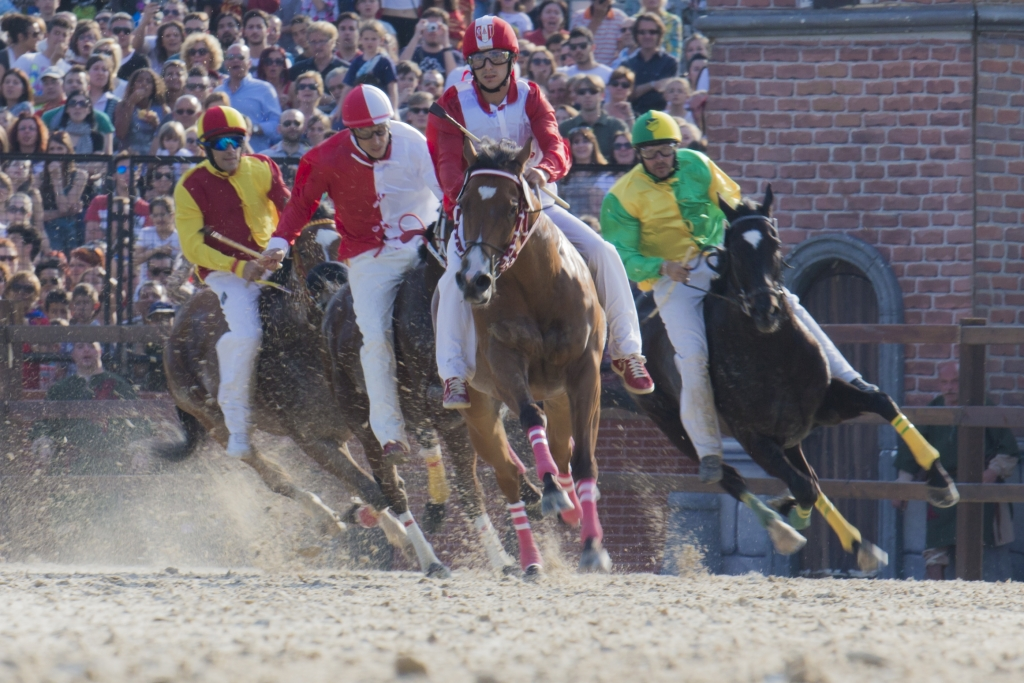
The horse race of the Palio di Legnano 2014

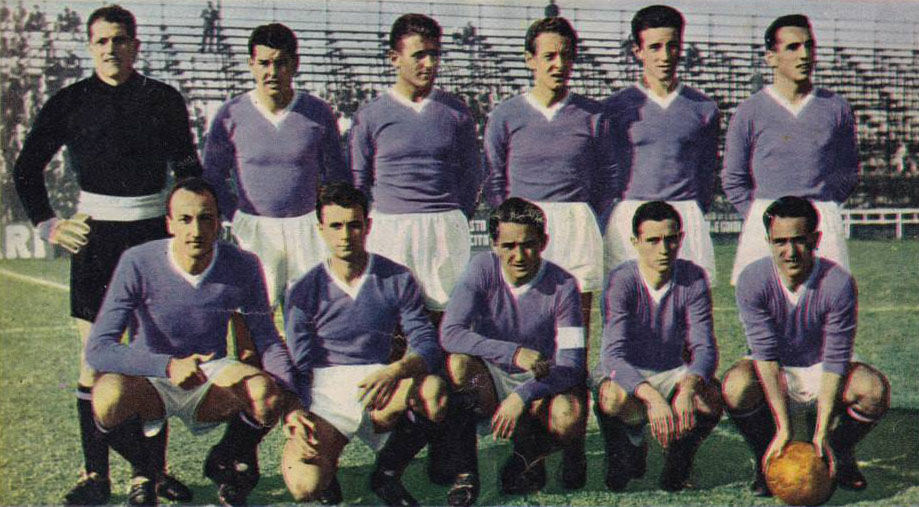
A.C. Legnano 1956–1957.

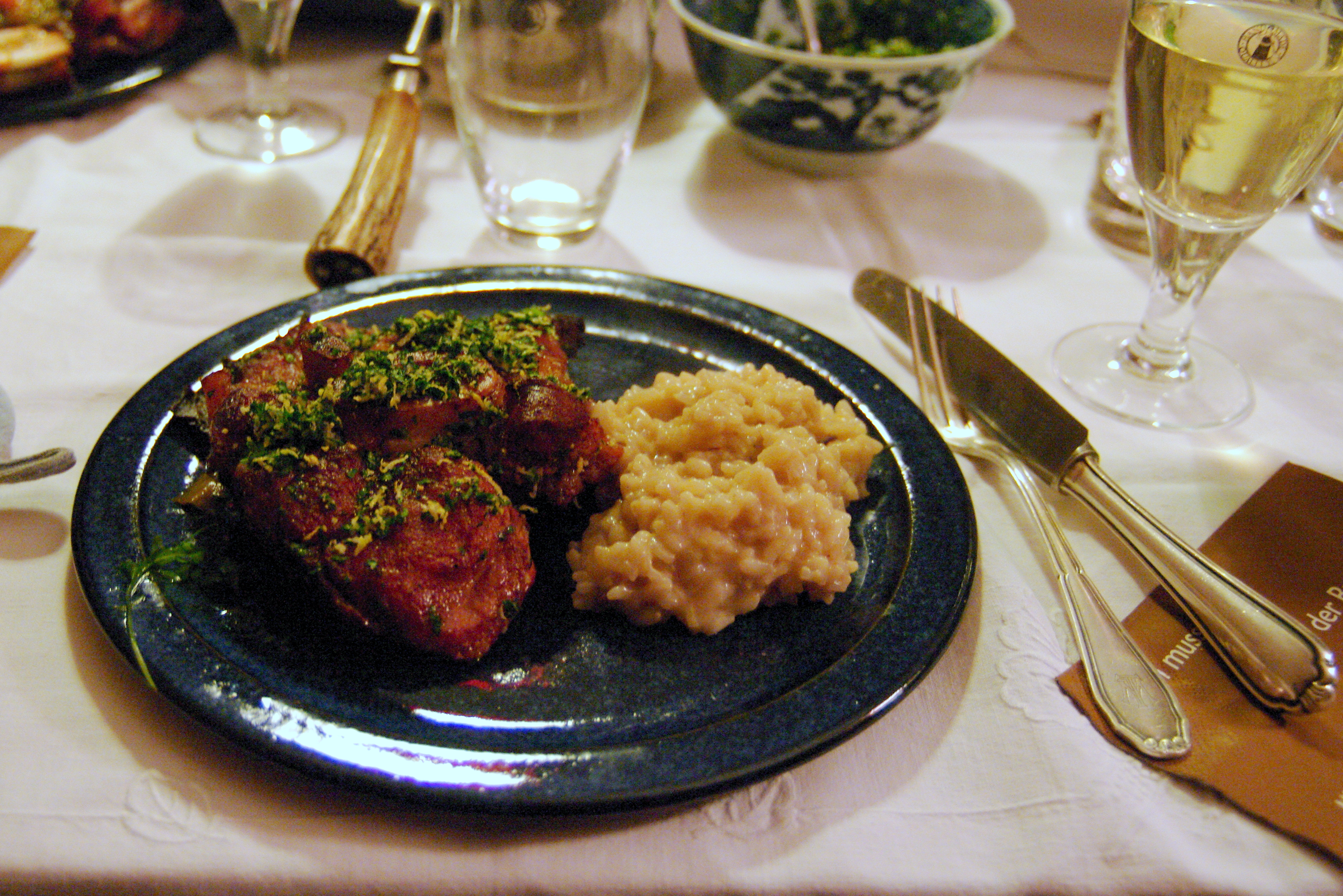
Ossobuco served with risotto alla milanese

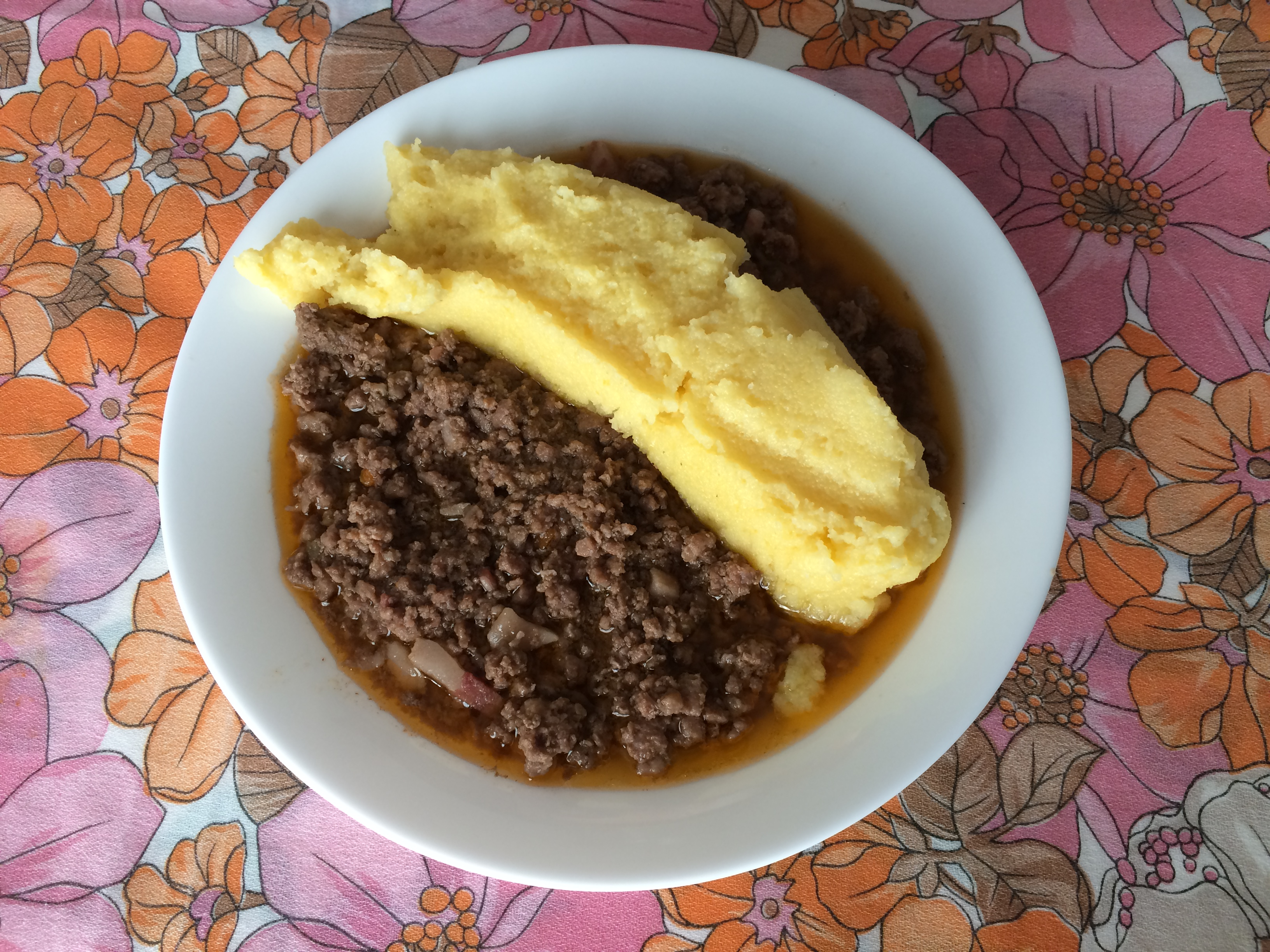
Bruscitti served with polenta porridge

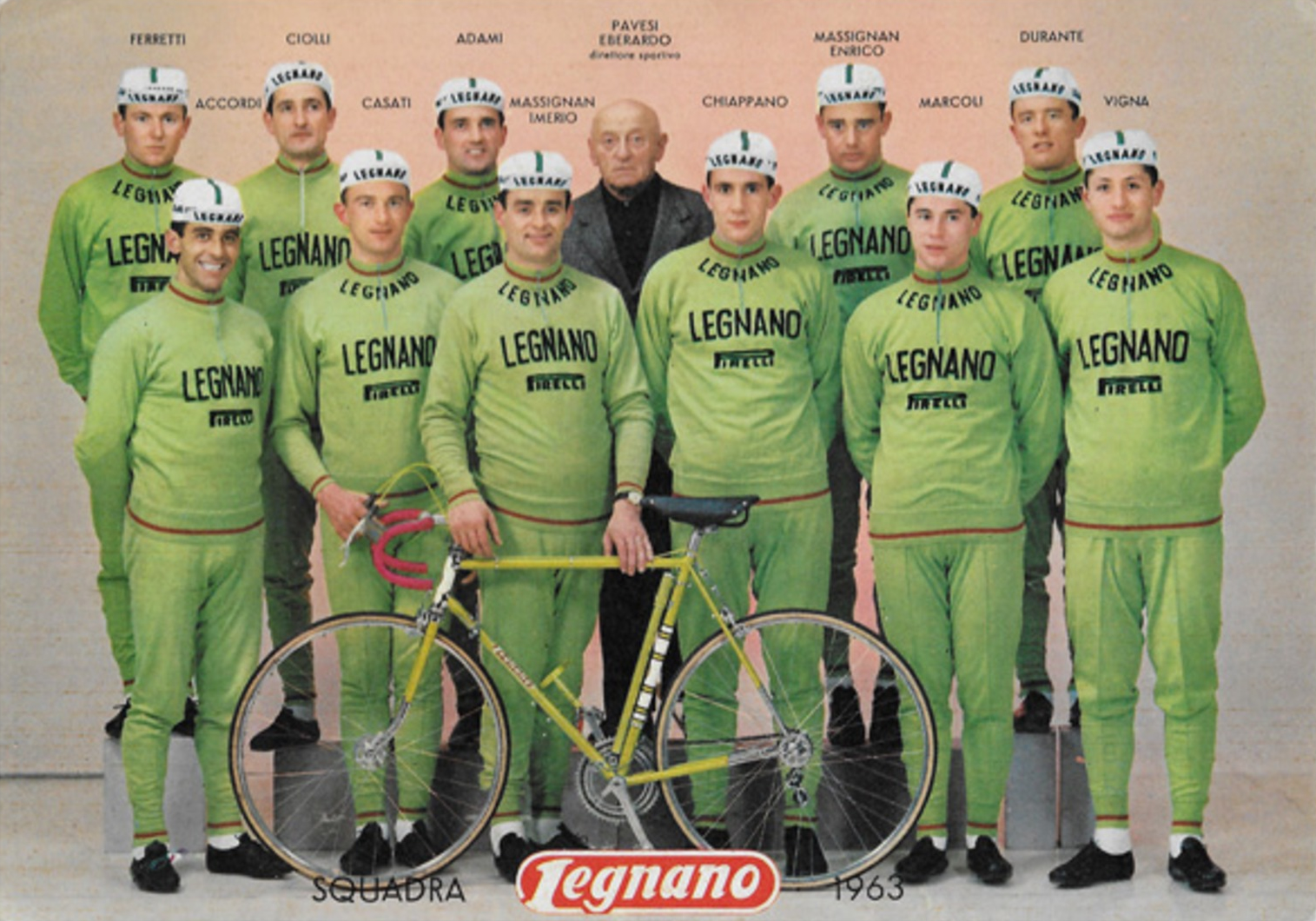
The Legnano racing bicycles team of 1963.

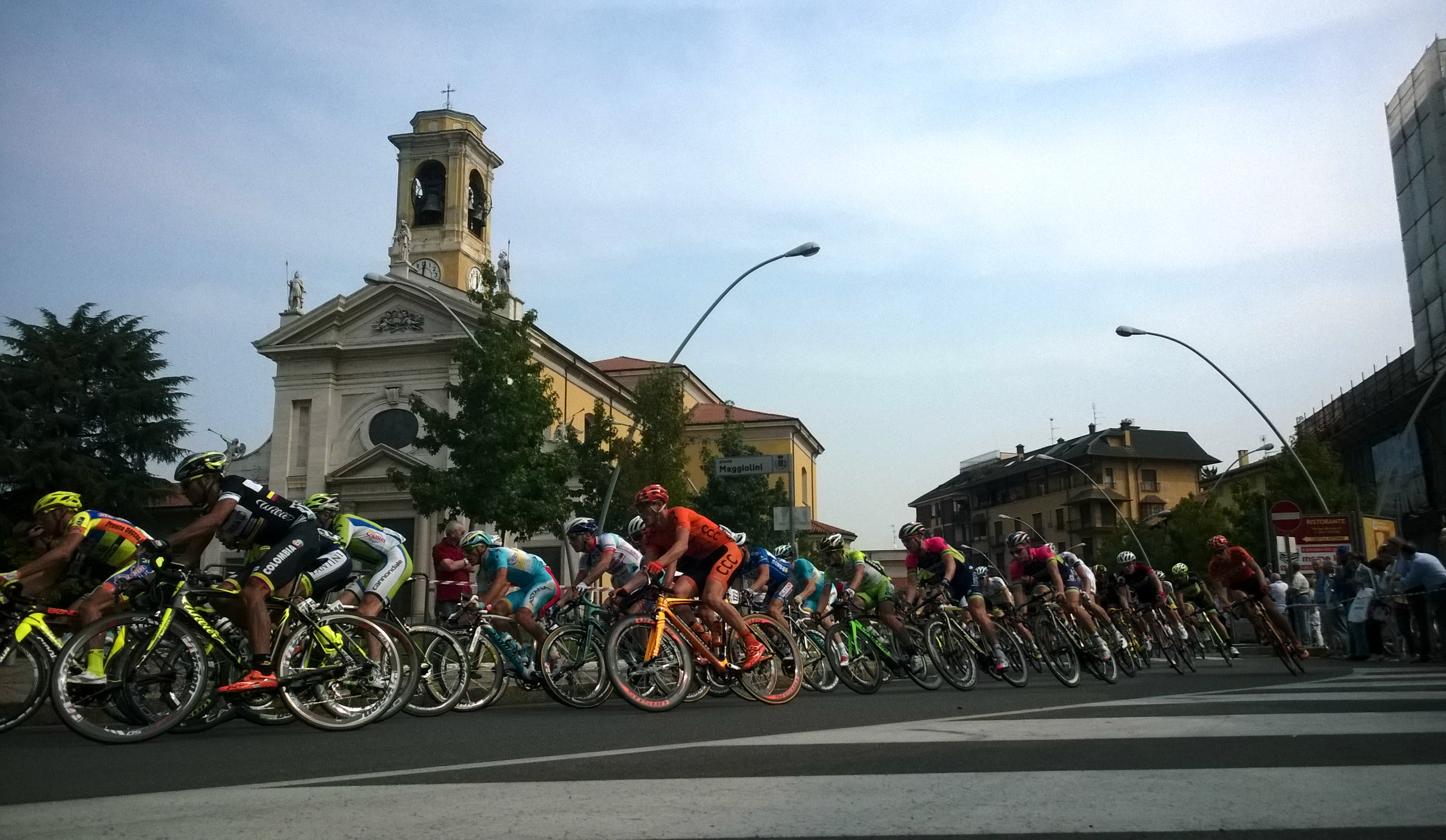
Coppa Bernocchi 2014. In the background, the church of Saints Gervasio and Protasio in Parabiago.

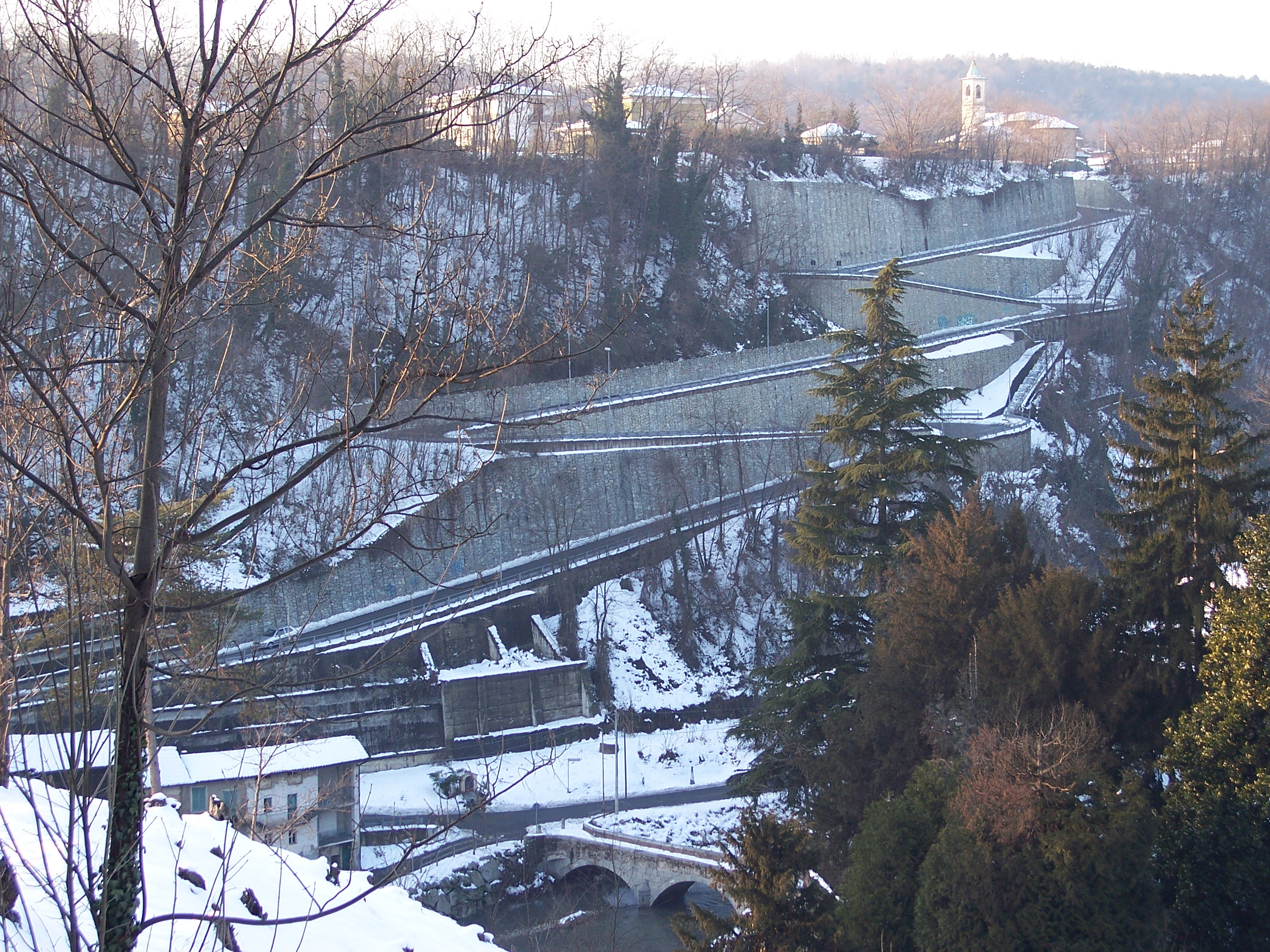
The "Little Stelvio", which is located between Castiglione Olona and Morazzone and which is called in this way because there is a difference of about 153 meters: it is one of the fixed passages of the Coppa Bernocchi.

=== Palio di Legnano ===
On the last Sunday of May, the historical re-enactment of the Battle of Legnano takes place with a parade in medieval period costumes through the streets of the city, followed by an equestrian race attended by the eight historical contrade: San Bernardino, La Flora, Legnarello, San Domenico, San Magno, San Martino, Sant'Ambrogio and Sant'Erasmo. The event, born in 1935, is known as "Palio di Legnano".

The winning contrada of the Palio has the right to keep in its church, until the following year, a copy of the crucifix of Ariberto da Intimiano, a sculpture of 1936 by the artisan of the worker of Luciano Sai, on a scale original medieval cross.

=== Museums and art galleries ===
The Museo civico Guido Sutermeister preserves, in particular, material from the city and the surrounding area, the "Legnanese". Most of the archaeological finds on display at the museum date back to a period between prehistory and the medieval longobard era, with particular reference to the Roman imperial era. The preserved finds testify to the frequenting of the area since the Copper Age and the existence of a sedentary civilization since the Bronze Age.

Another notable exhibition space in Legnano is the Alfa Romeo Fratelli Cozzi museum, which is housed in the basement of the dealership of the same name. The museum, strongly wanted by Pietro Cozzi, founder of the dealership, was opened in 2015 and houses about fifty Alfa Romeo models, including two models with unique features.

=== Music ===
Because of the Battle of Legnano, in which Emperor Frederick I was defeated by the Lombard League (1176), Legnano is the only other city mentioned, together with Rome, in the Italian national anthem by Goffredo Mameli. Giuseppe Verdi worked on La battaglia di Legnano in 1849, an opera in four acts with an Italian-language libretto by Salvadore Cammarano. It was based on the play La Bataille de Toulouse by Joseph Méry, later the co-librettist of Don Carlos.

=== Music Festival ===
Every year, since 2017, for about ten days, starting from the end of June, the Rugby Sound Festival takes place inside the Visconti Castle, after being relocated from the municipality of Parabiago. This festival is an annual music and cultural event featuring a diverse lineup of musical genres. The event is able to combine musical performances with a variety of street food offerings

=== Fashion and design ===
The fashion house Dolce & Gabbana was founded and has its administrative offices in Legnano. Founded in 1985, by the end of the 1990s the company's revenues were around US$500 million and in 2003 their revenue reached $633 million. By 2005, their turnover was €600 million.

=== Languages and literature ===
Around Legnano it's spoken Legnanese dialect, dialect of the Lombard language (belonging to the western branch), spoken by about 30% of the population of the area where it is spread. Like all Western Lombard dialects, legnanese is a Romance language derived from Latin with a Celtic substrate and longobard superstratum. In Legnanese dialect there are those who find traces of the languages of the peoples prior to the Latinization of the region, in particular the ancient Ligurian, although the data on the actual influence of this linguistic substrate are few and of varying interpretation. The linguistic influence of the Celts on the local speakers of Altomilanese was conspicuous, so much so that even today the dialect of Legnano is classified as "Gallo-Italic". However, it was the Roman domination, which supplanted the Celtic one, that shaped the local idiom spoken in Legnanese, so much so that the lexicon and grammar of this dialect is of Romance derivation.

In the dialect of Legnano are written the performances of the Italian dialect company I Legnanesi. Founded by Felice Musazzi and Tony Barlocco in 1949, it is the most famous example of en travesti theatre in Italy: it is one of the best-known companies in the European dialectal theatre scene.

=== Cuisine ===
In Legnano are widespread many dishes of Lombard cuisine like risotto (above all risotto alla milanese, which contains saffron), ossobuco, mostarda, cotoletta, cassoeula and panettone. Common in the whole Insubria area are bruscitti, originating from Alto Milanese, which consist in a braised meat dish cut very thin and cooked in wine and fennel seeds, historically obtained by stripping leftover meat.

=== Sport ===
Club	Sport	Founded	Failed	League	Palmares
A.C. Legnano	Men's football	1913	active	Serie D	Founded in 1913, it played three seasons in Serie A and a total of eleven seasons in the top tier of the Italian football league system.
Legnano Basket Knights	Men's basketball	1966	active	Serie B	It played for some seasons in Serie A2
Frogs Legnano	Men's American football	1977	active	Seconda Divisione	Among the most important American football teams in Italy, they were European champions in 1989 (with two appearances in the Eurobowl) and won 6 league titles (with 11 appearances in the Italian Superbowl) and a Coppa Italia (1993). The youth team won 2 Youngbowl (1991, 1992).
Baseball Softball Club Legnano	Baseball and softball	1950	active	Serie A2 (softball); Serie C1 (baseball)	The softball team won an Italian Serie A2 Cup (2005), a scudetto (2007), four Coppa Italia (2006, 2007, 2008 and 2015), a Cup Winners' Cup (2007) and a European Cup (2008).
Gruppo Sportivo Bernocchi Legnano	Women's basketball	1945	1956	–	It played for eleven seasons in Serie A, winning four scudetti.
SAB Volley	Women's volleyball	2016	2018	–	It played one season in Serie A1

Legnano hosted the 25th edition of European Fencing Championships. The 2012 European Fencing Championships took place from 15 to 20 June 2012 in the Visconti Castle of Legnano and in the PalaBorsani in Castellanza.

In Legnano held the Coppa Bernocchi, a European bicycle race. Since 2005, the bicycle race has been organised as a 1.1 event on the UCI Europe Tour. It is the last race of Trittico Lombardo, which includes three races held around the region of Lombardy in three consecutive days. These races are Tre Valli Varesine, Coppa Ugo Agostoni and Coppa Bernocchi. Coppa Bernocchi is one of the most historic cycling races in Europe, with nearly a hundred years of history, and one of the most important in Italy.

"Legnano" is a brand of lightweight racing bicycles, named for the city in which they were produced. Notably, celebrated racers Alfredo Binda, Learco Guerra, Gino Bartali and Fausto Coppi rode Legnano bicycles. Active from 1906 to 1966 was its racing team. The "Legnano" cycling team is ranked as the 6th most successful cycling team in history.

== Twin towns – sister cities ==
Legnano is twinned with:

- (Cameroon) Ebolowa, since 1964
- (France) Colombes, since 1964

== See also ==
- Guido Sutermeister Museum
