= Lampugnani =

Lampugnani may refer to:

- Lampugnani (surname), an Italian surname
- Lampugnani (famiglia), House of Lampugnani, an Italian family
- Lampugnani's Conspiracy, a painting by Francesco Hayez

== See also ==
- Lampugnano (disambiguation)
