= Dacius (bishop of Milan) =

Bishop of Milan from c. 530 to 552

- Archbishop of Milan
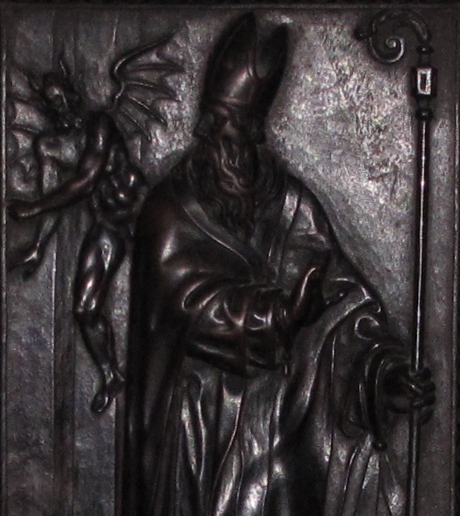
- Saint Dacius as an exorcist
- Church: Catholic Church , Orthodox Church
- Appointed: c. 530 AD
- Term ended: 5 February 552
- Predecessor: Magnus
- Successor: Vitale

Personal details
- Died: 5 February 552 Chalcedon

Sainthood
- Feast day: January 14
- Venerated in: Catholic Church, Orthodox Church

Dacius or Datius (Italian: Dazio) was Bishop of Milan from c. 530 to 552. He is honoured as a saint in the Catholic Church and in the Orthodox Church.

An active ecclesiastical politician, he was an ally of Pope Vigilius in the latter's struggles against Justinian, involved in the Three-Chapter Controversy. He is remembered as a defender of Catholic orthodoxy against the heresies of his day.

== The Gothic War ==
Before he became a bishop, Dacius was a monk. He was elected bishop of Milan on or about 530, and soon he had to face the worst period of the history of Milan, which started with the terrible famine of 535–6. During the famine, Dacius obtained some grain from the praetorian prefect for Italy, Cassiodorus, for free distribution to the poor.

At the same time as the famine, there began the Gothic War (535–554) between the Ostrogoths and the Byzantine Empire. Dacius sided with the Byzantines, and at the end of 537 (or early in 538) he went to Rome along with some representatives of the people of Milan to ask the Byzantine general Belisarius to send a force of 1,000 men, under Mundilas, to free the city from the Ostrogoths. Initially the operation was successful, but soon the Goths, led by general Uraias, allied with the Burgundians and besieged the town as they considered the support Milan gave to the Byzantines to be a betrayal. The town surrendered in March 539, and in revenge Uraias razed Milan to the ground, exterminated 30,000 male citizens and sold the women as slaves. Dacius survived this catastrophe because he was in Rome: he never returned to Milan again.

== The Three-Chapter Controversy ==
In 544-545 Dacius was in Constantinople where he witnessed the promulgation by the Emperor Justinian I of an edict in which the "Three Chapters" (i.e. some writings of Theodore of Mopsuestia, Theodoret of Cyrus and Ibas of Edessa) were anathematized. Justinian was attempting to reconcile the main part of the Church with the Non-Chalcedonian Christians, but most bishops saw in this anathema a possible denial of the Chalcedonian Creed. While the resistance of the Eastern bishops collapsed in a short time, those from the Latin-speaking bishops, such as Dacius, stood firm.

Justinian required Pope Vigilius, who opposed the edict, to come to Constantinople to sign the anathema. Vigilius had to leave Rome in November 545, but he tried to interrupt his travel by remaining for a long time in Sicily, where he was briefly joined by Dacius. However, on January 25, 547 the Pope arrived in Constantinople, where he was forced to stay by the Emperor till he approved the edict.

In 550 Dacius joined Virgilius in Constantinople, and he urged the Pope not to come to an agreement with the Emperor. In August 551 he and the Pope had to take sanctuary in the Basilica of St. Peter in Constantinople, where the Pope was beaten. On December 23, both Dacius and the Pope escaped again and took refuge in the Church of St. Euphemia in Chalcedon, from which Pope Virgilius issued an Encyclical letter describing the treatment he had received. Dacius died, probably at Chalcedon, on February 5, 552.

== Legacy ==
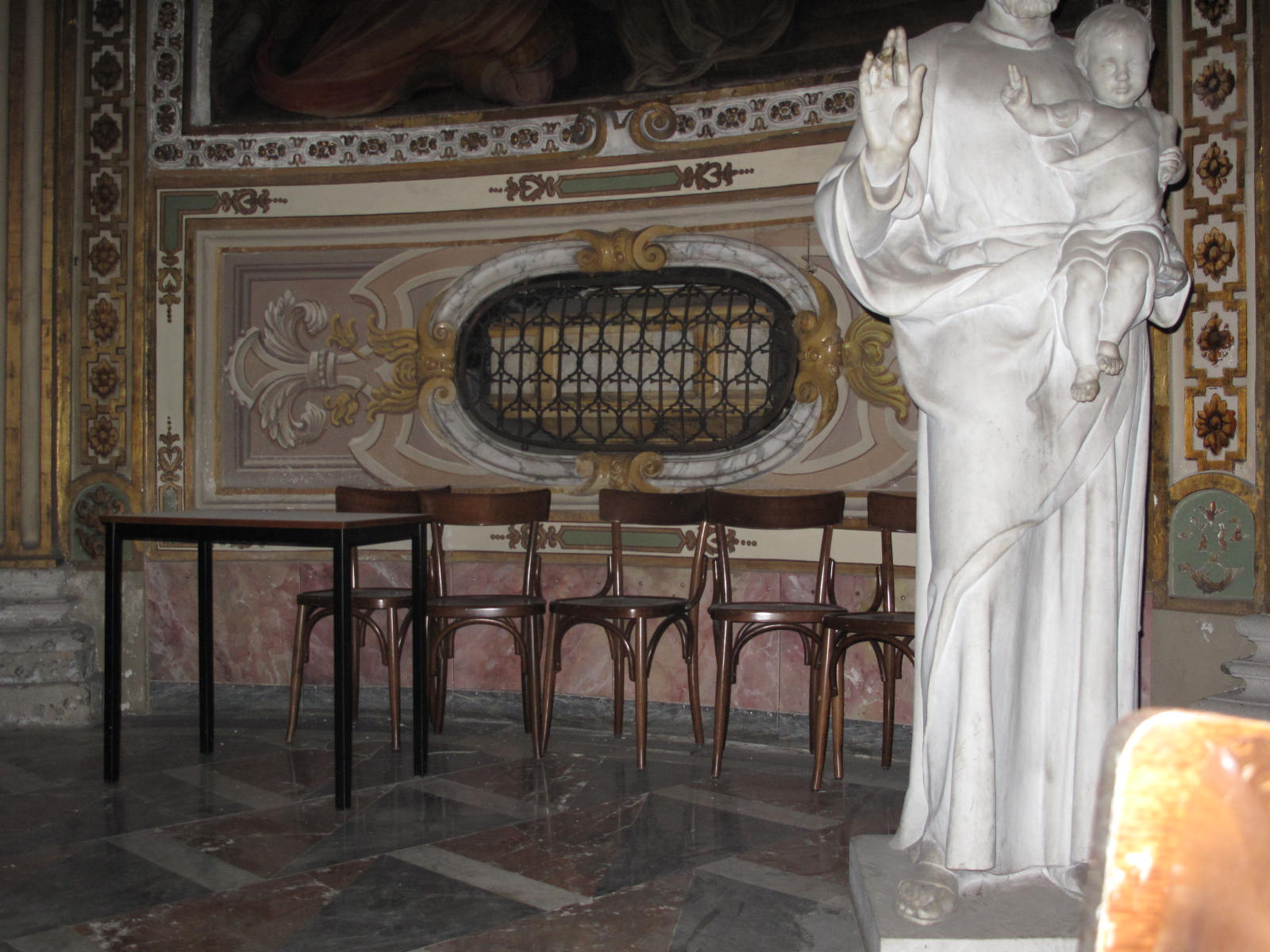
Wall with the Urn of Saint Dacius

Dacius' body was later translated from Chalcedon to Milan and buried in the Church of San Vittore al Corpo (Saint Victor Maurus) where it is still venerated. A late tradition, with no historical basis, associates Dacius with the Milan's family of the Agliati.

In Chapter 4 (Book 3) of his Dialogues, Gregory the Great describes Dacius as an exorcist:

In the time of the same Emperor, Datius, Bishop of Milan, about matters of religion, travelled to Constantinople. And coming to Corinth, he sought for a large house to receive him and his company, and could scarce find any: at length he saw afar off a fair great house, which he commanded to be provided for him: and when the inhabitants of that place told him that it was for many years haunted by the devil, and therefore stood empty: "so much the sooner," quoth the venerable man, "ought we to lodge in it, if the wicked spirit hath taken possession thereof, and will not suffer men to dwell in it." Whereupon he gave order to have it made ready: which being done, he went without all fear to combat with the old enemy. In the dead of the night, when the man of God was asleep, the devil began, with a huge noise and great outcry, to imitate the roaring of lions, the bleating of sheep, the braying of asses, the hissing of serpents, the grunting of hogs, and the screeching of rats. Datius, suddenly awaked with the noise of so many beasts, rose up, and in great anger spake aloud to the old serpent, and said: "Thou art served well, thou wretched creature: thou art he that diddest say: I will place my seat in the north, and I will be like to the highest: and now through thy pride, see how thou art become like unto hogs and rats; and thou that wouldest needs unworthily be like unto God, behold how thou dost now, according to thy deserts, imitate brute beasts." At these words the wicked serpent was, as I may well term it, ashamed, that he was so disgraciously and basely put down, for well may I say that he was ashamed, who never after troubled that house with any such terrible and monstrous shapes as before he did: for ever after that time, Christian men did inhabit the same; for so soon as one man that was a true and faithful Christian took possession thereof, the lying and faithless spirit straightways did forsake it. But I will now surcease from speaking of things done in former times, and come to such miracles as have happened in our own days.

To Dacius was wrongly attributed a legendary history of the first bishops of Milan up to Maternus, known as Datiana Historia Ecclesiae Mediolanensis. This text is today attributed to Landulf of Milan, a historian of the 11th-century.
