= Bernardino Lanini =

Italian painter

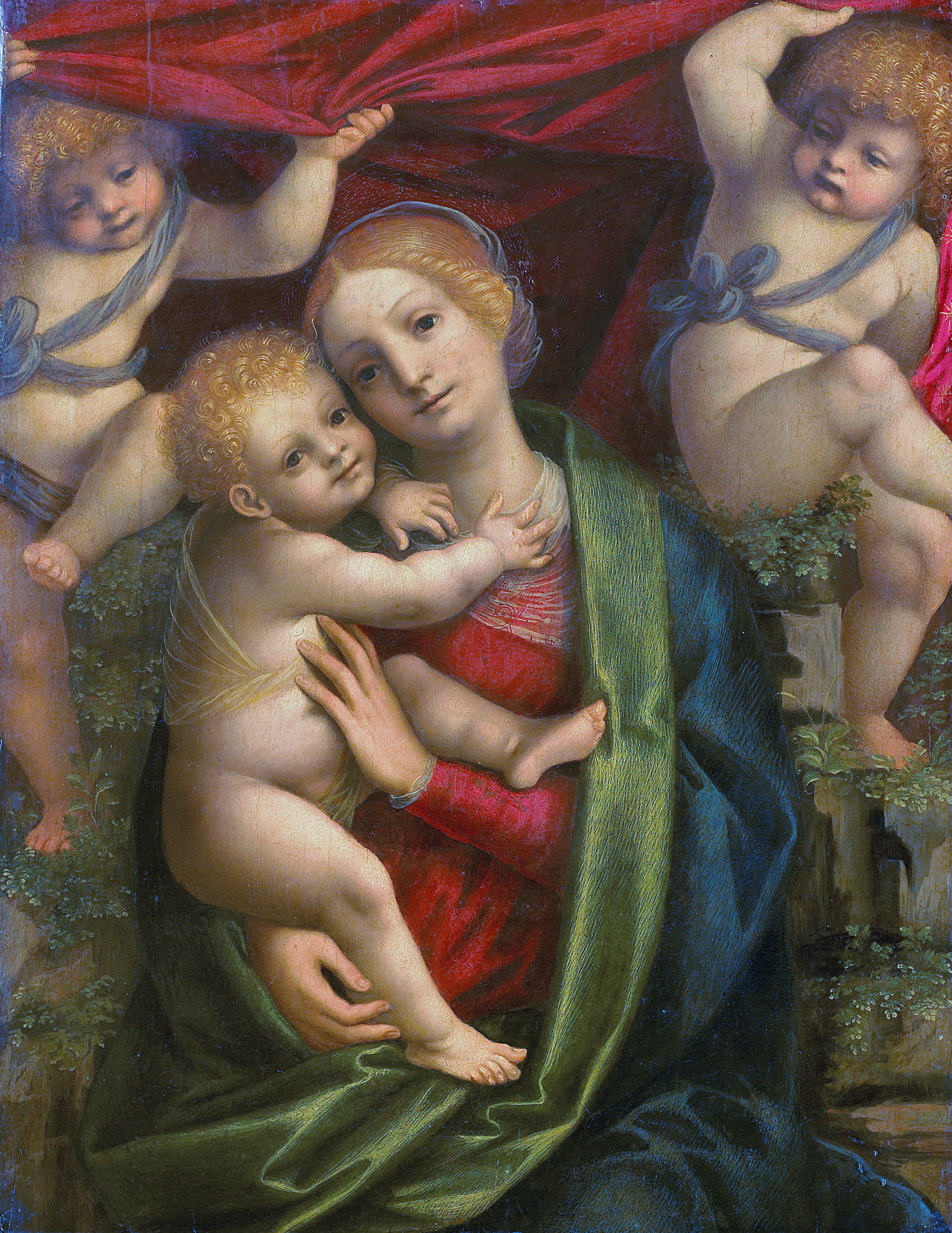
Madonna and Child, between 1525 and 1535

Bernardino Lanini or Lanino (c. 1512 – c. 1582) was an Italian painter of the Renaissance period, active mainly in Milan.

== Biography ==
Lanini was born in Mortara, Italy. He trained initially as a pupil of the painter Andrea Scotto, then worked with Pietro Perugino, and finally with Gaudenzio Ferrari. He painted a Last Supper for the church San Nazaro Grande in Milan, a Holy family for the church of Sant'Ambrogio, now on display in the Brera Gallery, and the frescoes on the Life of the Magdalen for the church of San Cristoforo in Vercelli. Three of his works are on display at the Museo Francesco Borgogna in Vercelli, including an Annunciation; a Madonna and Child with Saints Bernardino of Siena and St Francis of Assisi (also labelled Madonna del cane due to dog asleep below Virgin); and a painted standard of Madonna and Child with St Anne and hooded confraternity brothers, painted for the Confraternita di Sant'Anna. Lanini painted a St Catherine for the church San Celso. He frescoed sibyls for the Novara Cathedral. He also painted for a chapel in the Basilica of San Magno, Legnano. Other paintings are in Saronno.
