= Lampugnani (surname) =

Lampugnani is a surname. Notable people with the surname include:

- Gian Giacomo Lampugnani (active 2nd decade 16th century), Italian painter of the Renaissance
- Giovanni Andrea Lampugnani (died 1476), member of the Milanese nobility
- Giovanni Battista Lampugnani (c.1708–1786), Italian composer
- Vittorio Magnago Lampugnani (b.1951), Italian architect
