= Lampugnano (disambiguation) =

Lampugnano is a district (quartiere) of Milan, Italy

Lampugnano may also refer to:

- Lampugnano, underground station on Line 1 of the Milan Metro in Milan, Italy.
- Giorgio Lampugnano, university professor of Pavia and father of the Ambrosian Republic

== See also ==
- Lampugnani (disambiguation)
