= Magnus (bishop of Milan) =

Saint; Archbishop of Milan from 518 to c. 530

St. Magnus
- Archbishop of Milan
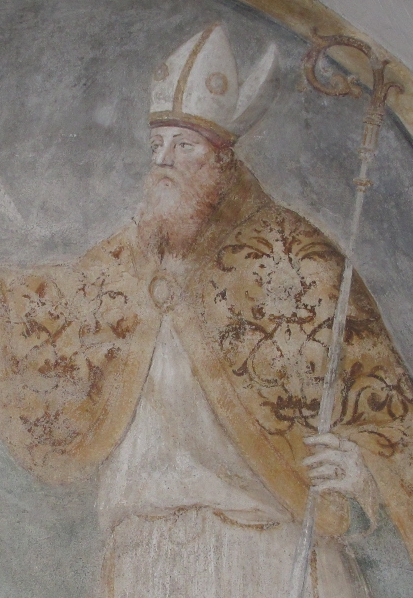
- Church: Catholic Church, Orthodox Church
- Appointed: 518 AD
- Term ended: c. 530
- Predecessor: Eustorgius II
- Successor: Dacius

Personal details
- Died: c. 530

Sainthood
- Feast day: 1 November
- Venerated in: Catholic Church, Orthodox Church
- Shrines: Basilica of Saint Magnus in Legnano

St. Magnus (Italian: Magno) was Archbishop of Milan from 518 to c. 530. He is honoured as a saint in the Catholic Church and Orthodox Church.

== Life ==
Almost nothing is known about the life and the episcopate of Magnus. Magnus lived under the Arian king Theodoric the Great, who probably at first supported him, but later persecuted him as had already happened for the philosopher Boethius.

What is known is the text of his funeral epitaph, transmitted us by Goffredo da Bussero (13th century), which describes Magnus as a man of great charity who helped the prisoners of war.

Magnus died on 1 December 530. His remains were interred in the Basilica of Sant'Eustorgio in Milan. A late tradition, with no historical basis, associates Magnus with the Milanese family of the Trincheri.

== Veneration ==
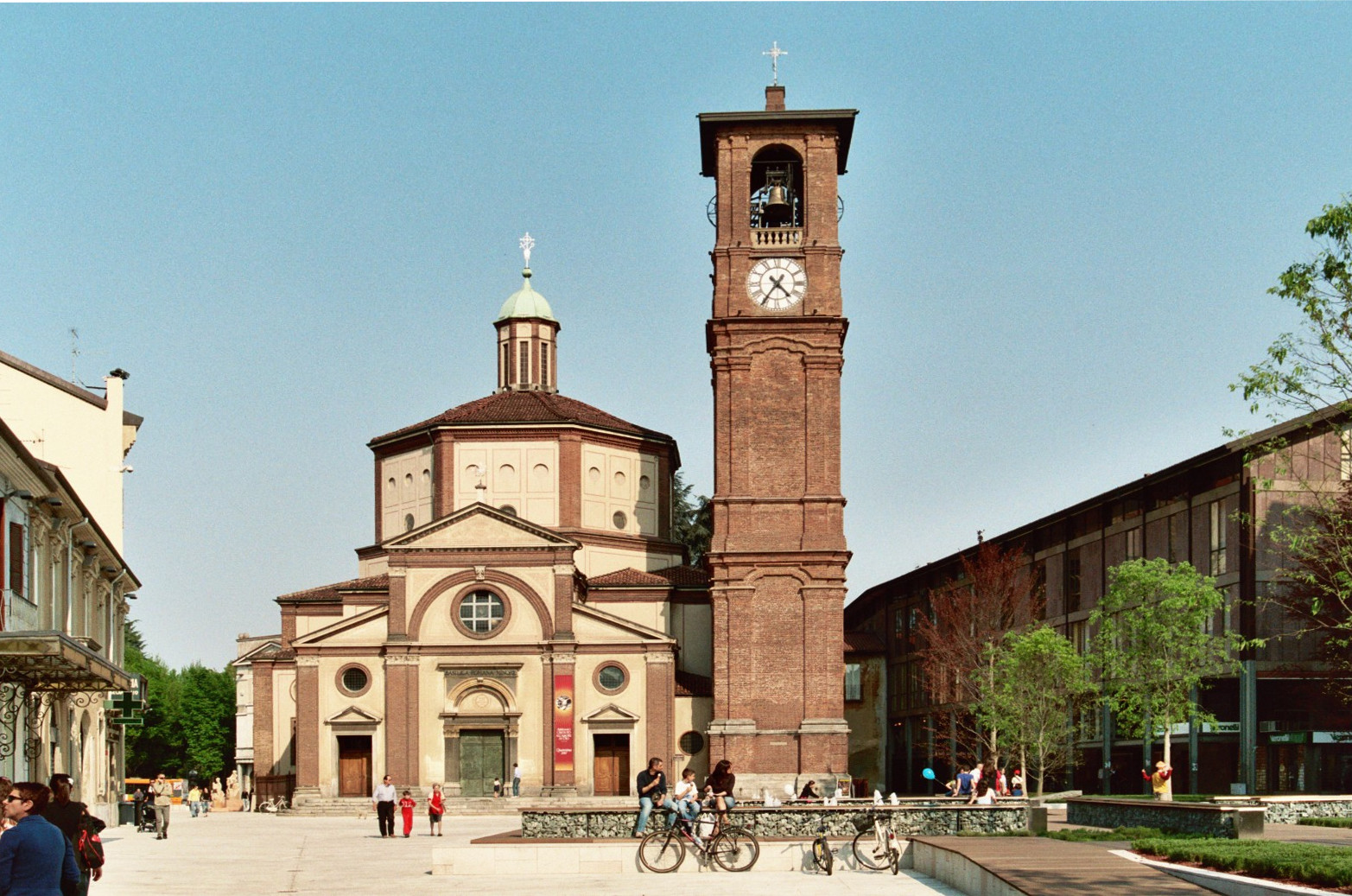
Basilica of Saint Magnus in Legnano

The first formal survey on his relics was made in 1248 by the Dominicans who ministered to the Basilica of Sant'Eustorgio in Milan. The main church of the town of Legnano, about 20 km (12 mi) from Milan, is dedicated to Magnus. The Basilica di San Magno of Legnano was built between 1503 and 1513 and a part of relics of Magnus were translated there on 5 November 1900. His feast is celebrated on November 5 in that basilica, but on November 1 in whole Catholic Church; all the saint bishops of Milan are celebrated on 25 September.
