= Gian Giacomo Lampugnani =

Italian painter

Gian Giacomo Lampugnani (active 2nd decade 16th century) was an Italian painter of the Renaissance period.

Few details are known of his life. He was born in Legnano. He was a member of the Lampugnani family that included the composer Giovanni Francesco, musician Giovanni Battista, and the infamous slayer of the Duke Sforza, Giovanni Andrea Lampugnani. He painted frescoes for churches in Legnano, including Santa Maria delle Grazie and the Basilica of San Magno.
