= Colli di Sant'Erasmo =

Wine from Lombardy

- Type: Wine
- Country of origin: Italy
- Region of origin: Lombardy
- Discontinued: 19th century
- Alcohol by volume: 10-12%
- Ingredients: Schiava grapes

Colli di Sant'Erasmo, also known as Ronchi di Sant'Erasmo (brüschétu in the dialect of Legnano), was a red wine produced in Legnano, in the Alto Milanese, a plains area of Lombardy, from the Schiava grape variety. The production of this wine ended with the disappearance of viticulture from its region of origin.

The production of Colli di Sant'Erasmo had grown steadily over the centuries, so much so that it became known and consumed even outside the regional borders of Lombardy.

== History ==
The earliest records of viticulture in the Alto Milanese date back to the Roman imperial age. Winemaking activity in the Alto Milanese, which reached its peak between the 18th century and the first half of the following century, when the entire area was cultivated with vines and cereals, was first put into crisis in the mid-19th century by several diseases that affected the plant. The first infection appeared between 1851 and 1852 and caused a rapid decrease in the amount of wine produced in Lombardy: hectoliters of wine produced dropped from 1 520 000 in 1838 to 550 000 in 1852.

The final halt of intensive wine production in the Alto Milanese, and with it that of the wine of the Colli di Sant'Erasmo, coincided with the occurrence, between 1879 and 1890, of two other vine diseases: downy mildew and powdery mildew; these were joined, also in the 19th century, by phylloxera, which heavily affected wine cultivation in the Alto Milanese. Following these epidemics, viticulture almost completely disappeared, and the peasants of the Alto Milanese concentrated their efforts on producing cereals and silkworms, which were equally profitable activities. In other wine-growing areas of Lombardy, the problem was solved by grafting species of vines that were immune to disease, a solution that was not applied in the Alto Milanese, where it was decided to abandon wine cultivation instead.

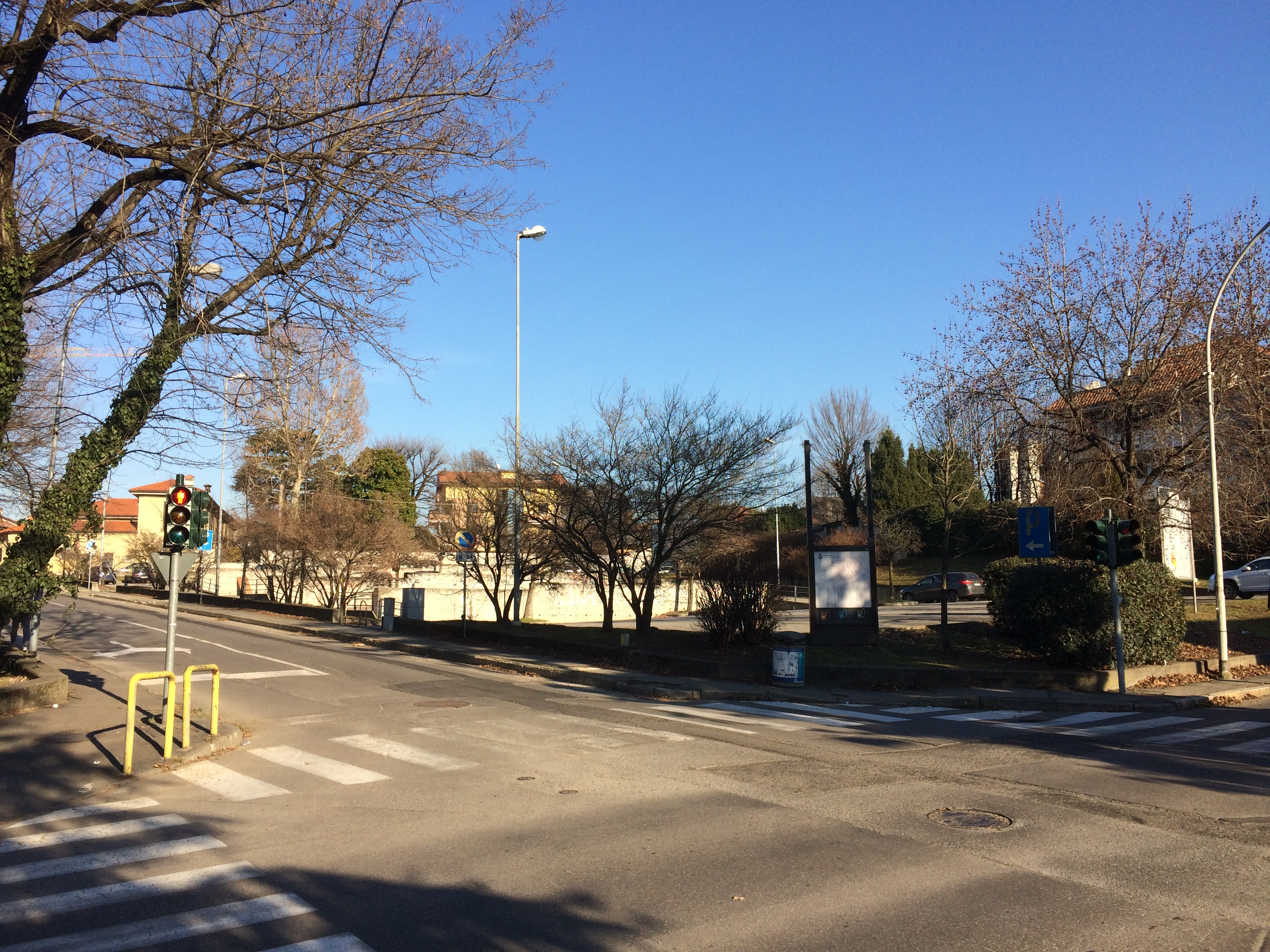
The parking lot located between Colli di Sant'Erasmo Street, Canazza Street, and Trivulzio Street: this is where the last vines of the Sant'Erasmo Hills were located until 1987

The last vine-grown fields of the Sant'Erasmo hills, located in Legnano and which give their name to the wine, were eliminated in 1987 to allow the construction of a parking lot to serve the nearby historic Civil Hospital, which in 2010 was moved to another area of Legnano. Only small plots survive to the 21st century, scattered throughout the countryside of Alto Milanese, cultivated by a few rows of vines.

The Colli di Sant'Erasmo, which was the most well-known wine among those originating in the Alto Milanese, was also historically produced by the friars of the Sant'Erasmo Hospice in Legnano. Other historic wines produced in the Alto Milanese were Santana and Clintù.

== Name origin ==
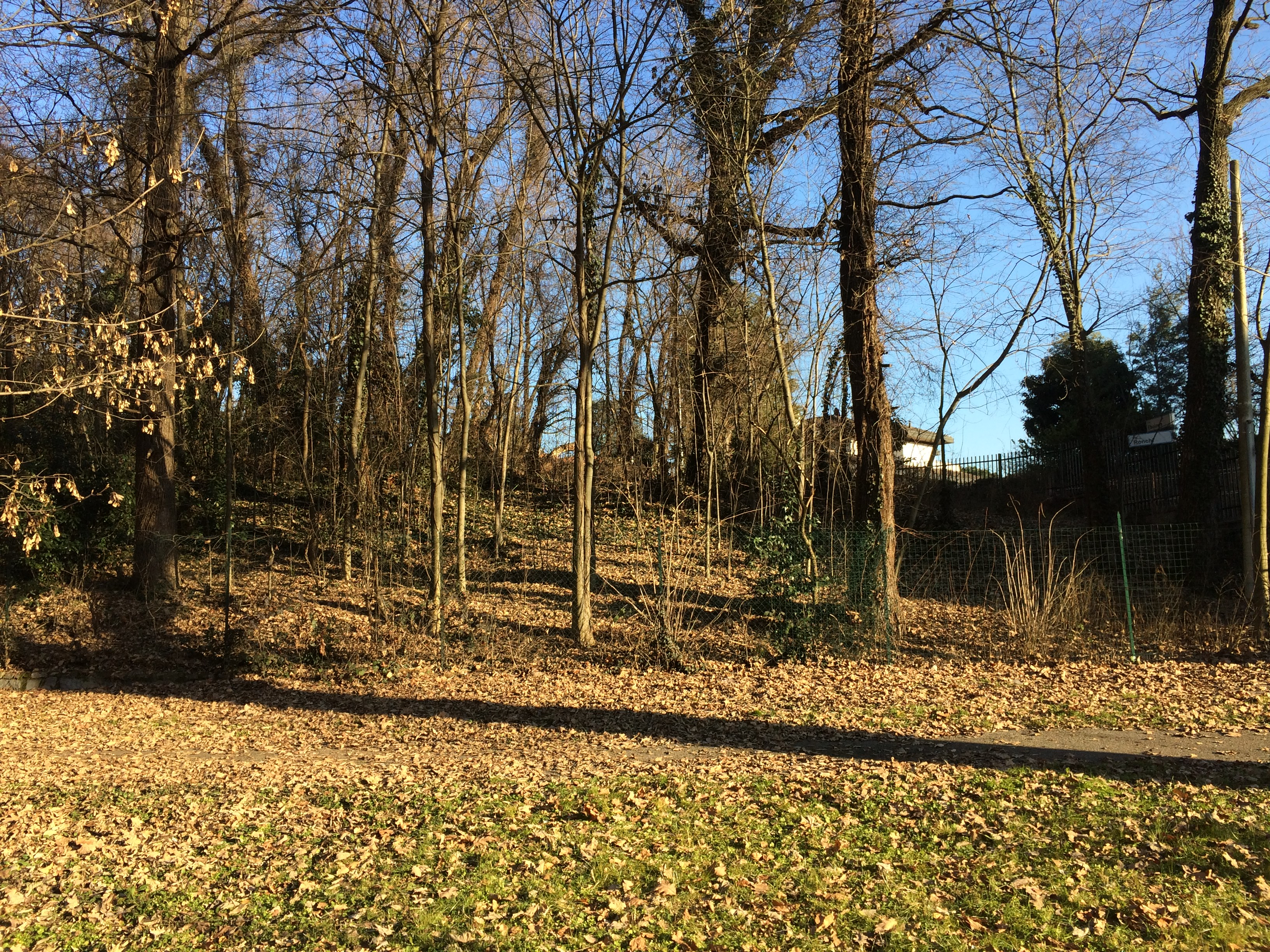
A view of the Ronchi di Legnanello, near the Ronchi Forest Park

The "Colli di sant'Erasmo," or "Ronchi di Sant'Erasmo," are moraine elevations found in Legnano. The district of Sant'Erasmo is a hilly area of Legnano that is located slightly higher than the historic city center, which is in fact located downstream, along the course of the Olona River.

This elevated area corresponds to a large morainic plateau that extends over a wide territory and was formed by deposits accumulated over the centuries by the Olona River; this natural geological deposit is called "Ronco" by the people of Legnano. Originally, at the height of the Ronco, the Olona formed a bend to the left that led to the accumulation of debris and the birth of the plateau.

== Grape variety ==
The grape variety with which Colli di Sant'Erasmo was historically produced was Schiava, which in the Alto Milanese area is known as "Botascera": other names by which this grape variety is known are "Schiava Lombarda," "Matta," "Mergellana," "Montorfana," and "Schiava di Como." Botascera was also widespread in other areas, such as Brianza, and is still cultivated, in Lombardy, in the provinces of Como, Brescia, and Bergamo.

Later on, after the disappearance of the native vine species of the Alto Milanese caused by the mentioned diseases that affected the plant, Colli di Sant'Erasmo continued to be produced with the Clinto grape, which is immune to the previously mentioned diseases. However, the cultivation of this grape can no longer be used to produce wine, as established by EC Regulation No. 1493/1999 of the European Economic Community.

== Production techniques ==
Since the vines were supported by tree trunks according to the Arbustum gallicum technique, the rows of the plant were located at the edges of the fields, which were instead cultivated with cereals.

As for the wine production technique, after the harvest, the grapes were dried for a few days and then pressed with the feet in vats. The obtained must underwent a boiling phase that lasted 4-5 days: then it was pressed with manual wine presses. Then the natural fermentation phase took place in barrels. After fermentation, the wine was bottled and sold.

== Characteristics ==
Legnano, an area once covered by moors, is characterized by the presence of limestone and clay soil. For this reason, the Colli di Sant'Erasmo wine possessed an alcohol content of between 10 and 12 degrees, was mellow and not aged, robust-bodied and strongly structured, with intense color and low acidity, high aromaticity, and proeminent tannin presence.

== Recommended pairings ==
The dishes that could be paired with Colli di Sant'Erasmo were those that needed to be accompanied by a full-bodied and structured wine, such as bruscitti, a typical dish of the Upper Milanese area, given the sensory characteristics of the Legnano wine.

== See also ==
- Sant'Erasmo Hospice
- Lombardy wine
- Italian wine
- Lombardy

== Bibliography ==
- Agnoletto, Attilio (1992). San Giorgio su Legnano - storia, società, ambiente [San Giorgio su Legnano - history, society, environment] (in Italian).
- Il Palio di Legnano : Sagra del Carroccio e Palio delle Contrade nella storia e nella vita della città [The Palio of Legnano : Sagra del Carroccio and Palio delle Contrade in the history and life of the city] (in Italian). Banca di Legnano. 2015.
- D'Ilario, Giorgio (2003). Ospedale di Legnano, un secolo di storia [Legnano Hospital, a century of history] (in Italian). Il Guado.
- Ferrarini, Gabriella; Stadiotti, Marco (2001). Legnano. Una città, la sua storia, la sua anima [Legnano. A city, its history, its soul] (in Italian). Telesio editore.
- Sutermeister, Guido (1940). Il castello di Legnano - Memorie n°8 [The Castle of Legnano - Memoirs No. 8] (in Italian). Tipografica Legnanese.
- Vecchio, Giorgio; Borsa, Gianni (2001). Legnano 1945 -2000. Il tempo delle trasformazioni [Legnano 1945 -2000. The time of transformations] (in Italian). Nomos Edizioni.
