= Healthcare in Italy =

- Total value of Italian Healthcare (including budget for Ministry of Health and Italian National Health Service): ▲€ 185 Billion (2025)

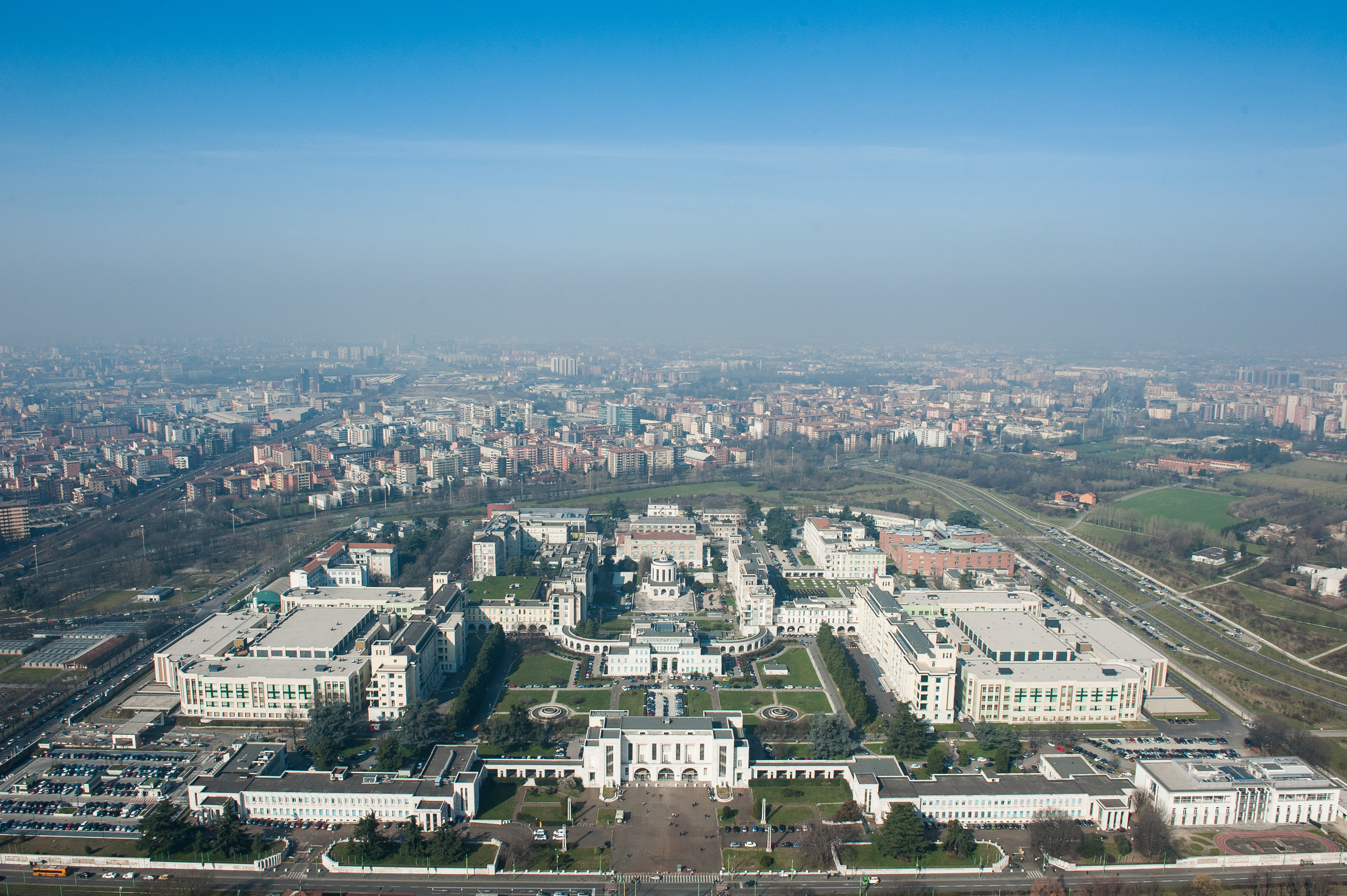
Grande Ospedale Metropolitano Niguarda, Milan

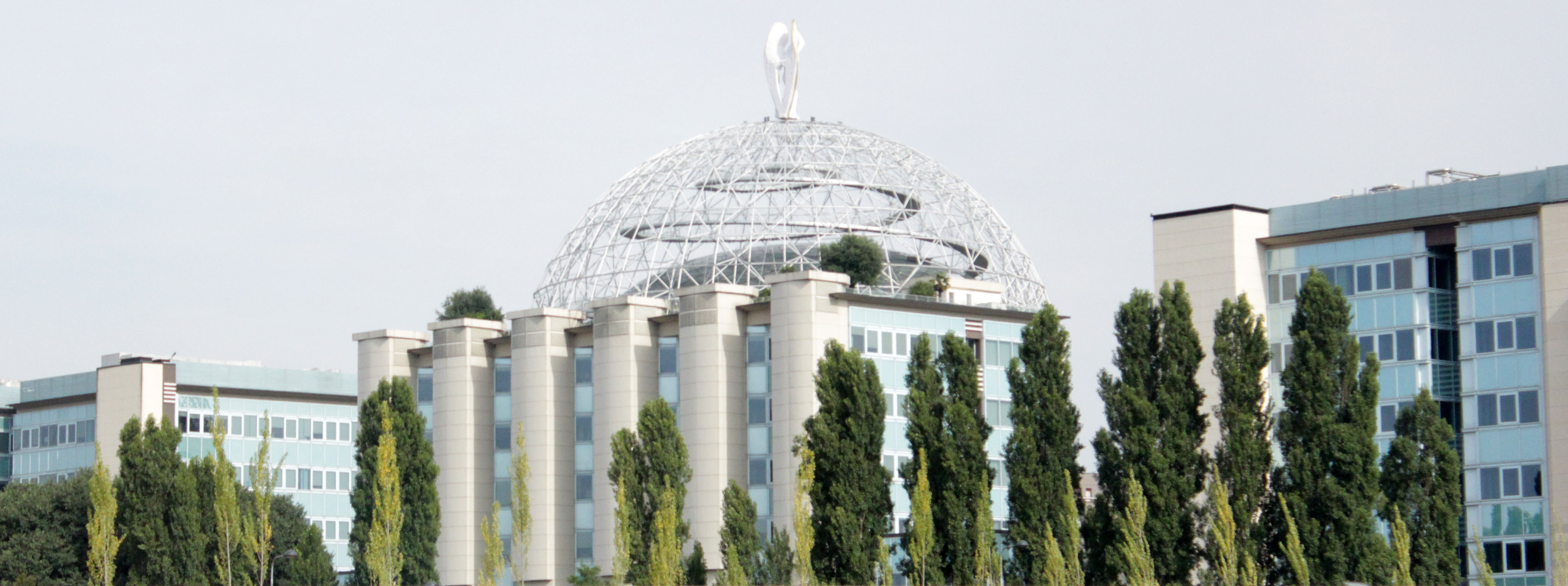
San Raffaele Hospital, Milan

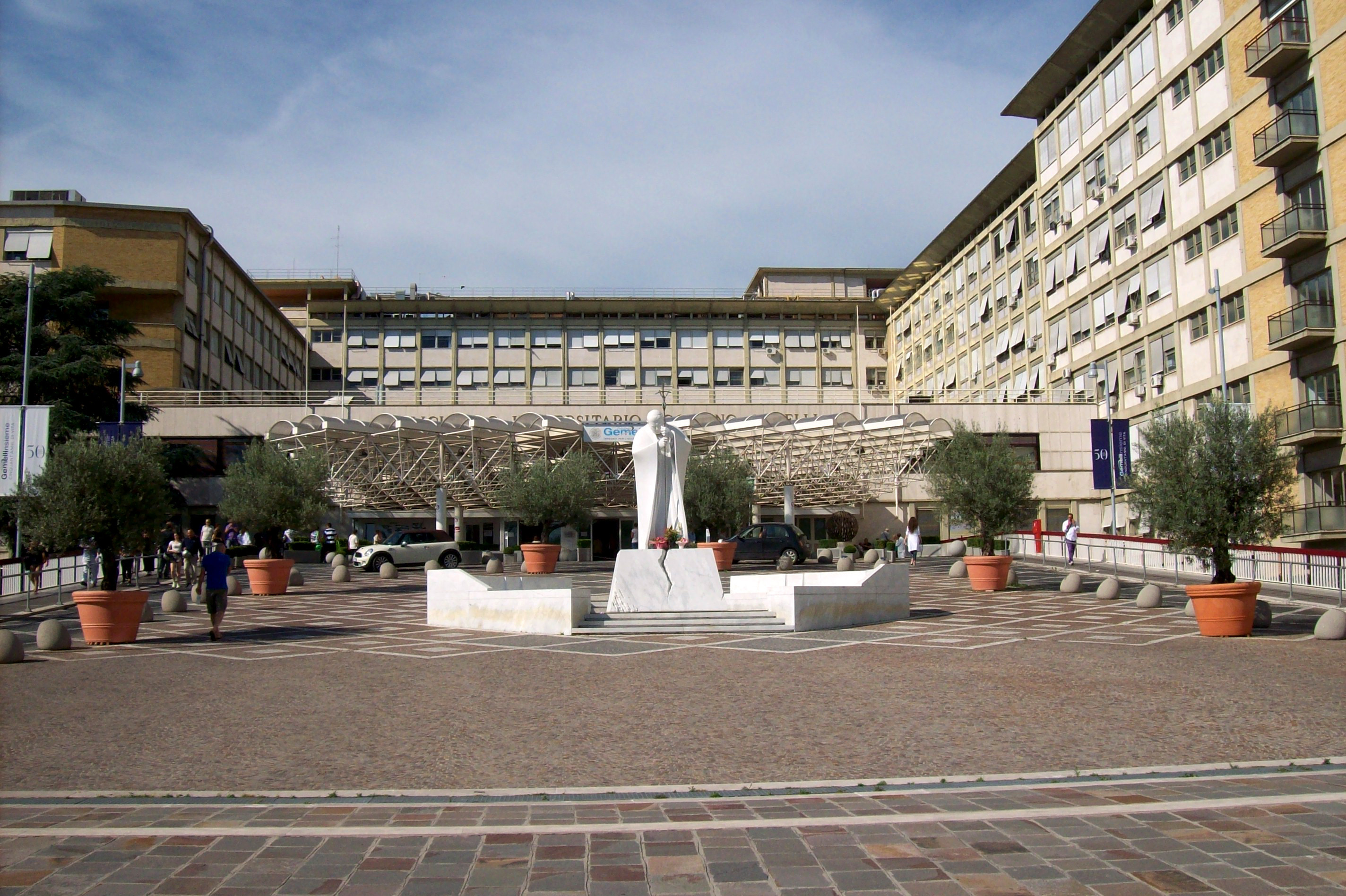
Gemelli University Hospital, Rome

The Italian healthcare system is one of universal healthcare largely financed by government through a Beveridge model. The system aims to provide health as a fundamental right, in following with article 32 of the Italian Constitution. Life expectancy is the 4th highest among OECD countries (83.4 years in 2018) and the world's 8th highest according to the WHO (82.8 years in 2018). Healthcare spending accounted for 9.7% of GDP in 2020.

The Italian state has run a universal public healthcare system since 1978. The public part is the Servizio Sanitario Nazionale, which is organised under the Ministry of Health and administered on a devolved regional basis, in consequence of the 2001 Italian constitutional referendum.

== History ==
After World War II, Italy re-established its social security system including a social health insurance administered by sickness funds and private insurances. In the 1970s the social health insurance faced severe equity problems as coverage differed between the sickness funds, around 7% of the population remained uninsured, especially in the South. Moreover, sickness funds went practically bankrupt by the mid-1970s. Due to growing public dissatisfaction with the existing healthcare system, Italian policymakers led by the Christian-Democrats instituted structural reform. In 1978, the government established the SSN (Servizio Sanitario Nazionale, lit. 'National Health Service') including universal coverage for the whole population financed through tax funding. Private health continued to exist, but was reserved for those who were willing to pay for extra services or services not offered by the SSN, such as dentistry or psychology.

== National Health Service ==
National Health Service
- Italian National Health Service
- Servizio Sanitario Nazionale (SSN)
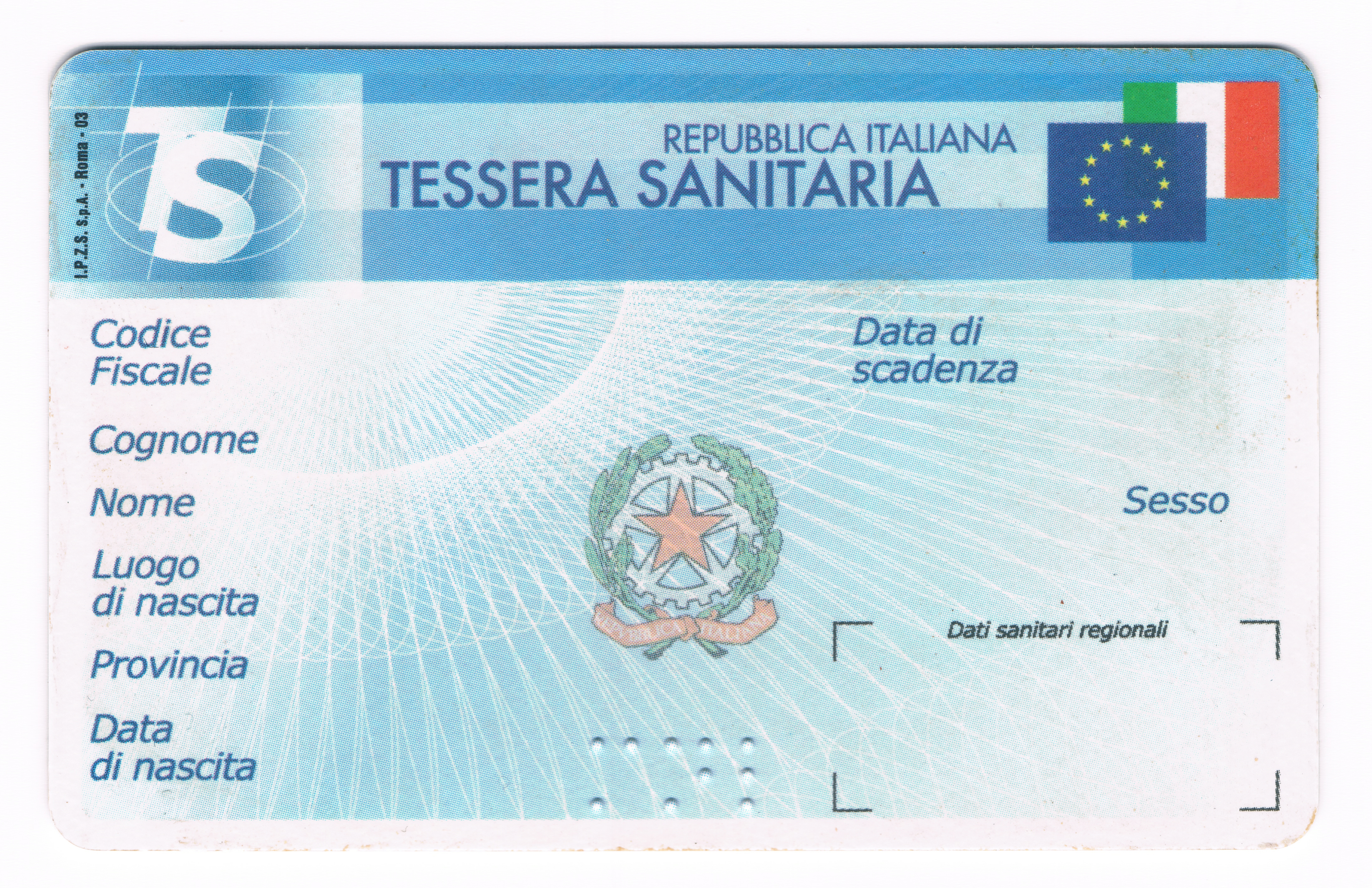
- Italian National Health Service card
- Predecessor: Sistema Mutualistico Italiano
- Formation: December 23, 1978; 47 years ago
- Founder: Ministero della Salute
- Funding: ▲€122.679 Billion (2020) ▲€127.627 Billion (2021) ▲€131.674 Billion (2022) ▼€131.119 Billion (2023)
- Website: salute.gov.it

The National Health Service was created in 1978. Healthcare is provided to all citizens and residents by a mixed public-private system. The public part is the national health service, Servizio Sanitario Nazionale (SSN), which is organized under the Ministry of Health and is administered on a regional basis. The state sets the Essential Levels of Care_{it} that each region must guarantee by law to all its inhabitants. By 2023, healthcare expenditure accounted for 80% of the total budget of Italian regions. The public fund allocation for the National Health Service fund for 2014 was 109,902 billion euros.

Family doctors are entirely paid by the SSN, must offer visiting time at least five days a week, and have a limit of 1500 patients. Patients can choose and change their GP, subject to availability. Prescription drugs can be acquired only if prescribed by a doctor. If prescribed by the family doctor, they are generally subsidized, requiring only a copay that depends on the medicine type and on the patient's income (in many regions, all prescribed drugs are free for the poor). Over-the-counter drugs are paid out-of-pocket. Both prescription and over-the-counter drugs used to be sold only in licensed shops (farmacie), until a 2006 law decree liberalised the sale of over-the-counter drugs in supermarkets and other shops (parafarmacie). In a sample of 13 developed countries, Italy was sixth in its population-weighted usage of medication in 14 classes in 2009 and fifth in 2013. The drugs studied were selected on the basis that the conditions treated had a high incidence, prevalence and/or mortality, caused significant long-term morbidity, incurred high levels of expenditure, and significant developments in prevention or treatment had been made in the last 10 years. The study noted considerable difficulties in cross-border comparison of medication use.

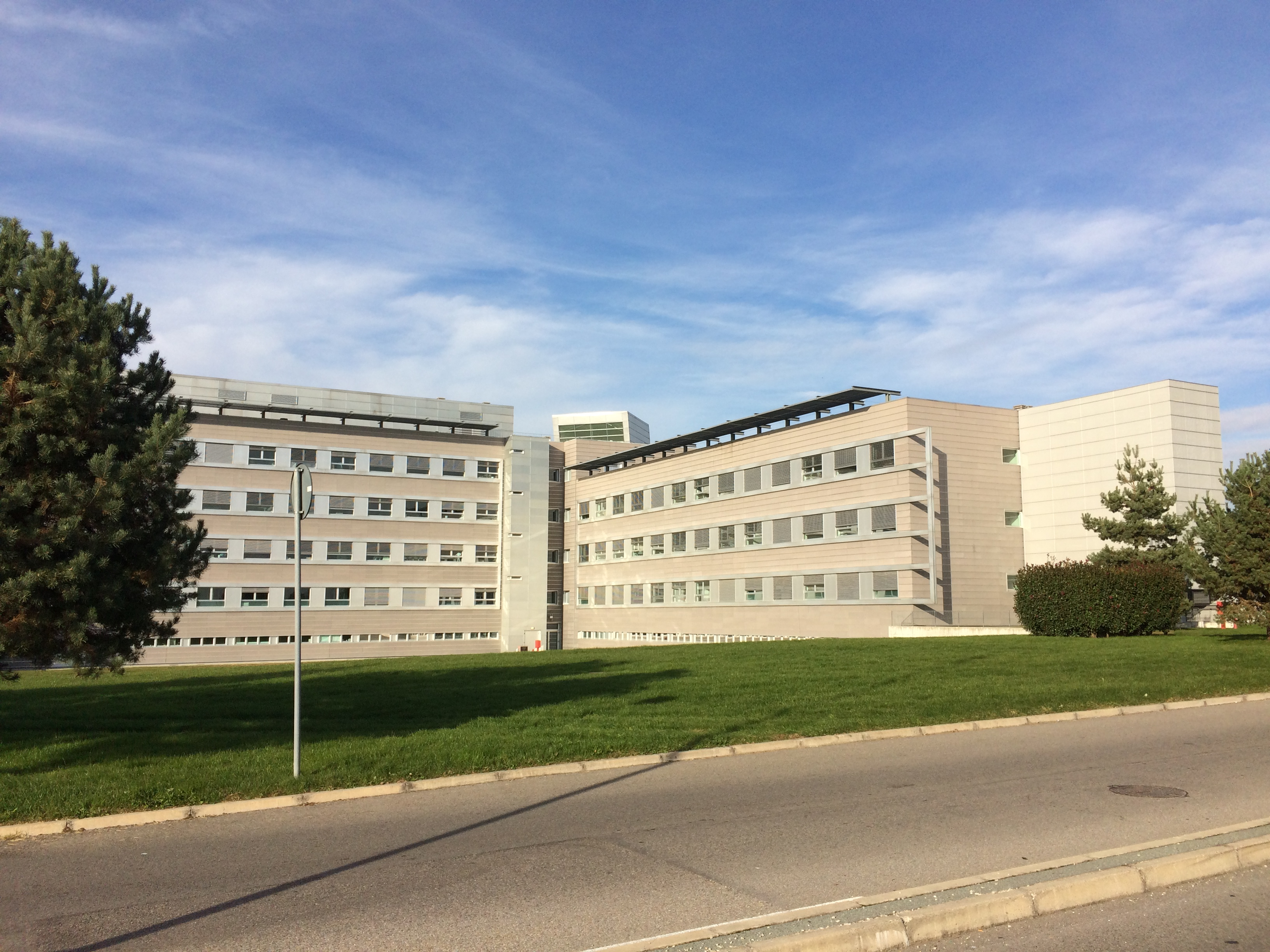
The Civil Hospital of Legnano

Visits by specialist doctors or diagnostic tests are provided by public hospitals or by private ones with contracts to provide services through the national health service, and if prescribed by the family doctor require only a copay (of the order of $40 for a visit without any diagnostic test) and are free for the poor. Waiting times are usually up to a few months in the big public facilities and up to a few weeks in the small private facilities with contracts to provide services through the national health service, though the referring doctor can shorten the waiting times of the more urgent cases by prioritising them.

Physicians who are salaried by the State within the National Health Service can also engage in freelance practice, charging as private practitioners (the so called intra moenia). This generates a clear conflict of interest for the management of waiting lists in the national health care system because private practice takes away the availability of services from those who wish to use public health care, in the absence of the financial possibility of paying for the service from private. Against this problem, on 4 June 2024, the Meloni government passed a decree which provides for the obligation for doctors of the National Health Service to carry out a lower number of hours of independent profession (intra moenia) than those of ordinary activity.

The intra moenia had been introduced by former Health Minister Rosy Bindi to remove people from private facilities and return them to public ones, and to regulate the professional fees of medical specialists. Management had been entrusted to the individual regions.

Italian citizens are often forced to turn to private healthcare service to carry out visits with specialist doctors and diagnostic tests, even urgently prescribed by their family doctors, since the waiting lists are too long and the first availability date in public hospitals is too further in time. In June 2024, the Meloni government introduced the opening of specialist doctors' clinics and facilities that carry out diagnostic tests on Saturdays and Sundays. It has also created a single telephone number at the regional level which brings together the availability of public and private health facilities accredited by the National Health System; for those who do not show up for the booked specialist visit/examination, without cancelling at least two days in advance, it has established that the payment of the ticket for the related health service will be paid in a reduced form.

== Performance ==
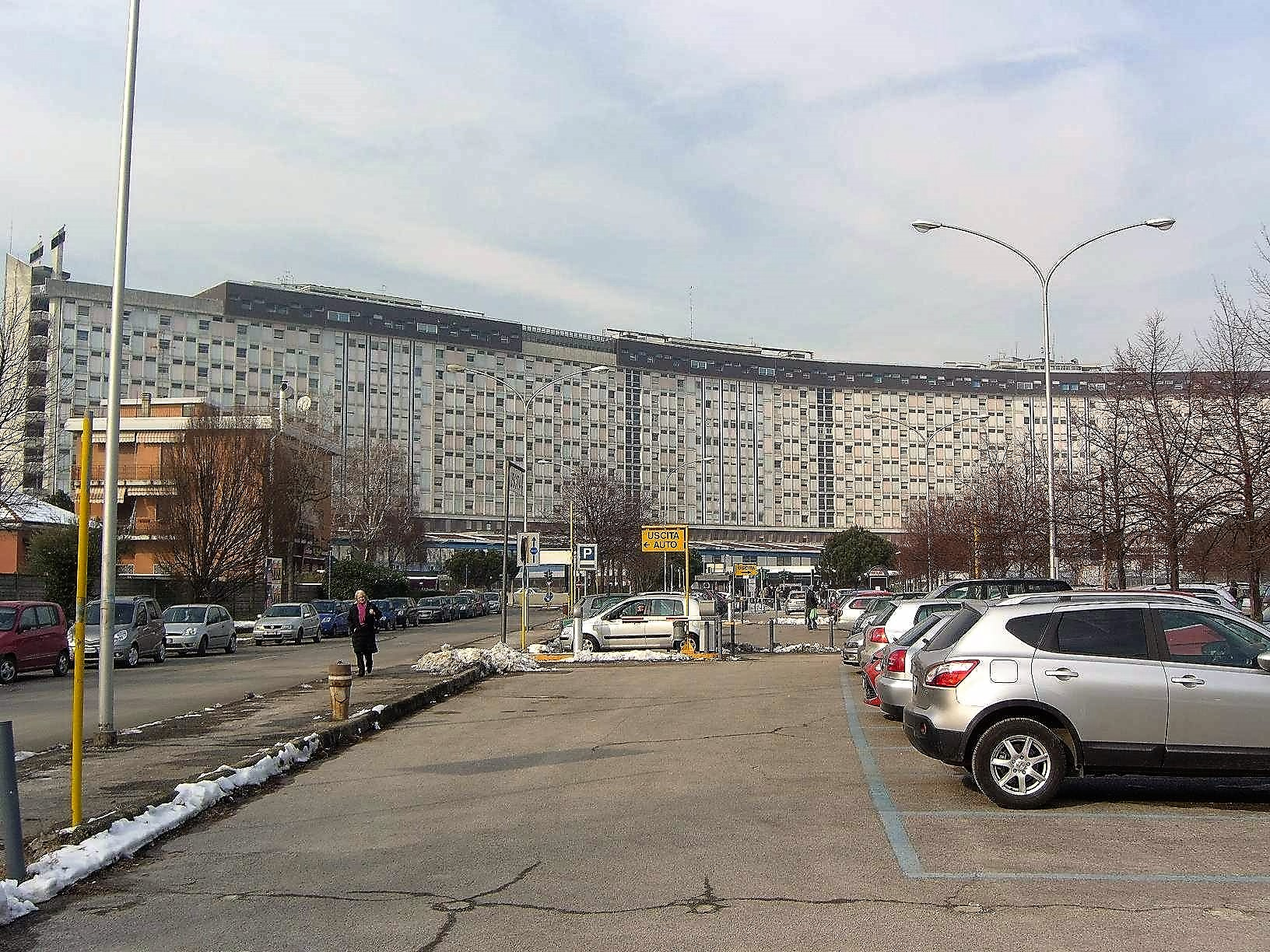
San Gerardo Hospital of Monza

The Italian National Outcomes Programme (in Italian: Programma Nazionale Esiti) permits the measurement of variation in the quality and outcomes of care by region, which is very considerable. It is published annually by the National Agency for Regional Health Services (Agenzia Nazionale per i Servizi Sanitari Regionali, Agenas). For example, in 2016 the proportion of patients receiving coronary angioplasty within 48 hours of a heart attack varied from about 15% in some regions, such as Marche, Molise, and Basilicata, to nearly 50% in the northern regions Valle d'Aosta and Liguria. Measured at Local Health Authority level, the levels varied between 5% and more than 60%. This geographic variability was the greatest of any of the 11 countries studied by the OECD. There is evidence of internal patient movement probably driven by a search for better quality care generally from the poorer and less developed southern regions to the more prosperous north.

According to the C.R.E.A. Sanità report entitled "Maintenance or Transformation: public intervention in healthcare at a crossroads", presented in January 2025 at the headquarters of the CNEL in Rome, only 20% of citizens pay more in taxes than that they receive in services from the National Health Service. There is a shortfall of €40 billion to bring the system into line with European Union levels.

== Family physician ==
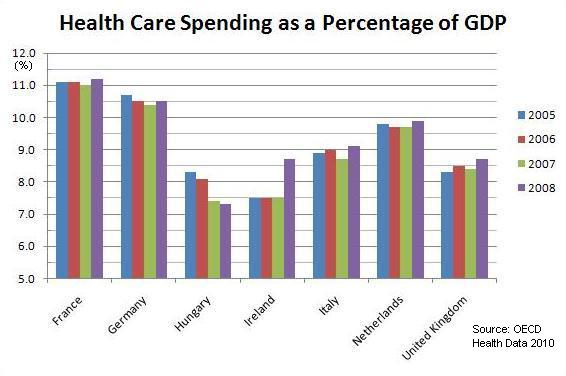
Total health spending as a percentage of GDP in Italy compared with other developed nations in the period 2005–2008

The family doctor has a six-year degree in medicine, which is common to hospital doctors, out-of-hours service physicians and all medical specialities. At the end of this, they are obliged to attend a three-year specialisation course in general medicine that includes theoretical and practical activities (first aid, local emergency services, paediatrics, work experience in a general medical practice already operating in the relevant area) and a final thesis.

While the six-year degree in medicine must be obtained from a public university, the three-year specialisation is provided by the professional association. Both of them are limited to a fixed maximum number of yearly enrollments.

Homeless people do not have a legal right to a family physician because they do not have a domicile or a primary residence, required by law for this basic service.

== Nurses ==
As of 2025, Italy is one of the European countries with the lowest ratio of nurses to hospitalised patients. To meet this need, various regions have begun to draw on professionals from abroad: Lombardy with Argentine nurses, while others have turned to Paraguay, Albania and Indonesia. Minister Schillaci has planned to hire some of the 3 million Indian nurses.

== Drugs ==
The Italian Medicines Agency authorises the marketing of medicines in Italy for a determined pathology, negotiates market prices with pharmaceutical companies, and establish their possible reimbursement by the National Health Service. In this way, medicines are divided into three categories: medicines paid for entirely by the patient and free medicines that are paid for entirely by the National Health Service. In the latter case, the medicine is provided free of charge by pharmacies without citizens having to pay any money up front, which is then reimbursed by the State. The class related to drugs paid at 50% by citizens and at 50% by the State has been abrogated in 2000.

Citizens may be exempted from paying the ticket for medicines on the basis of age (those aged over 65 or under 6) and family net total income_{it}, or in the presence of a chronic pathology.

Homeless people cannot benefit from exemption because they need to have a home for having their net income public certification._{it}

Citizens can choose between a generic drug and the other commercial drugs available in the national market under the same active principle, paying the price difference between those two.

In accordance with the 2025 government budget law, AIFA had to exclude drugs for non-rare diseases such as cardiovascular or degenerative diseases from access to the Innovation Fund, discriminating on the basis of patients' health conditions.

The regions have the power to expand the categories of persons exempted from paying ticket for medicines.

== Pharmacies ==
The Bersani-Visco Decree_{it} ended the monopoly of pharmacies in the sale of non-prescription drugs, authorising their sale in supermarkets as well.

Legislative Decree No. 153 of 3 October 2009 introduced the Farmacia dei Servizi (Service Pharmacy) operating model in Italy. Pharmacies are no longer seen solely as places for the distribution of medicines, but as local centres for contact and coordination between general practitioners, paediatricians and hospitals.

Article 25 of the 2025 Simplification Bill expands the range of services that can be provided by pharmacies:

- electrocardiogram, spirometry, holter monitoring or a telemedicine cardiology consultation, blood sugar monitoring;
- all vaccines included in the national vaccination plan for people over the age of 12 (e.g. flu, COVID, Herpes, HPV, pneumococcus);
- collection, on behalf of ASLs, of medical devices necessary for patient treatment;
- diagnostic tests using nasal, saliva or oropharyngeal swabs, screening tests for antibiotic resistance and hepatitis C.

The Regions can expand the range of services offered: for example, some of them have provided for the collection of faecal samples for colorectal cancer screening.

== Diagnostics ==
By June 2026, the European Union's Recovery and Resilience Plan (PNRR) funds finance the substitution of 3,000 large machines that have been in use for more than five years will be replaced with the latest generation of equipment (such as CT scanners, MRI machines, linear accelerators, angiography machines, ultrasound scanners, mammography machines), representing an investment of €1.2 billion. As of October 2025, approximately 2,800 units have been tested and are in use. This corresponds to the replacement of about one-third of the 9,000 machines in use in Italian public healthcare facilities, half of which are considered obsolete. The PNRR funding does not include the costs of hiring and training the personnel necessary to operate the equipment.

== Emergency medicine ==
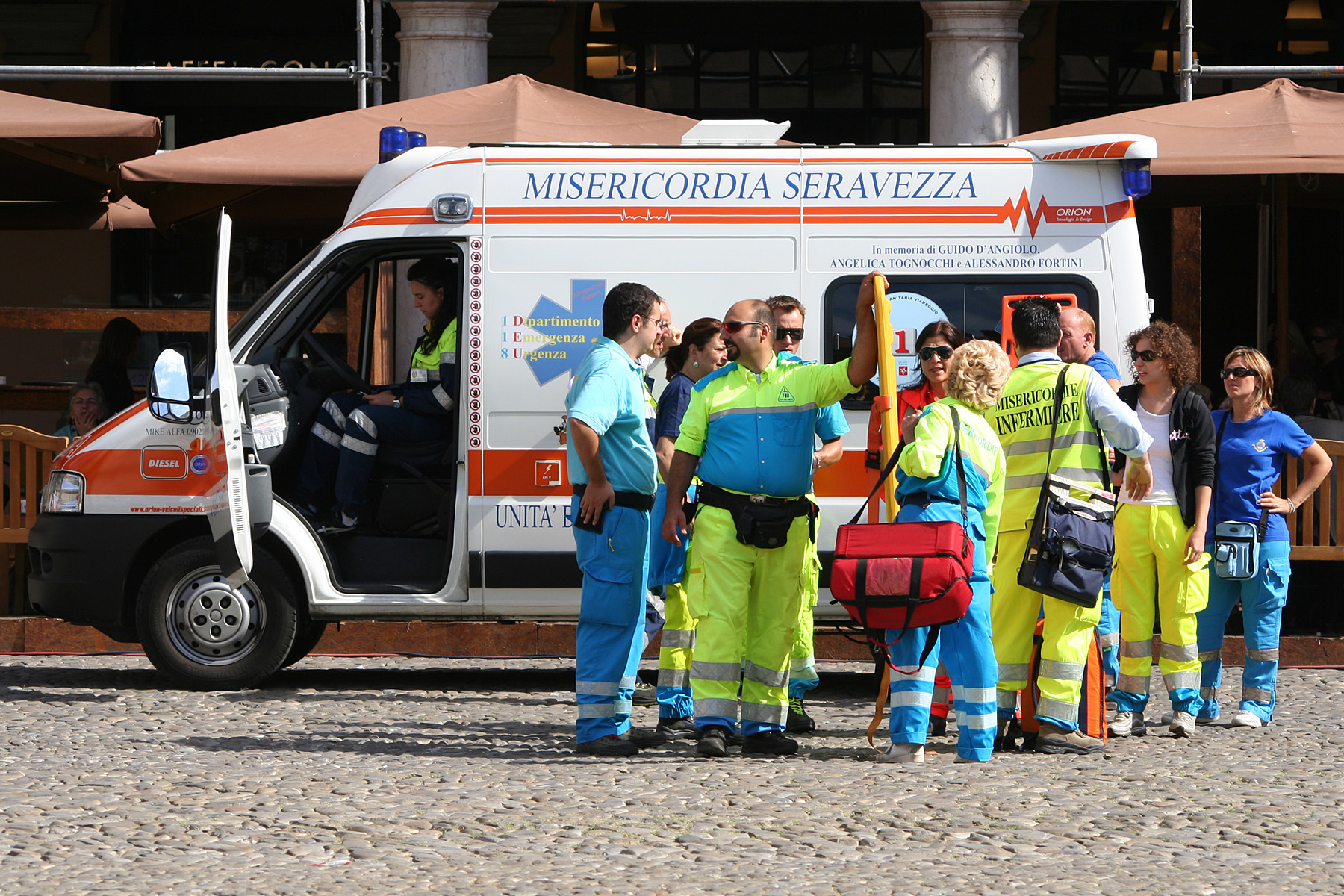
An ambulance and its crew in Modena

First aid is provided by all the public hospitals: for urgent cases it is completely free of charge for everyone (even for an undocumented non-citizen), while a copay (about $35) is sometimes asked for non-urgent cases.

== See also ==
- Health in Italy
- Associazione Volontari Italiani Sangue
