= Sant'Erasmo Hospice =

Hospice in Legnano, Italy

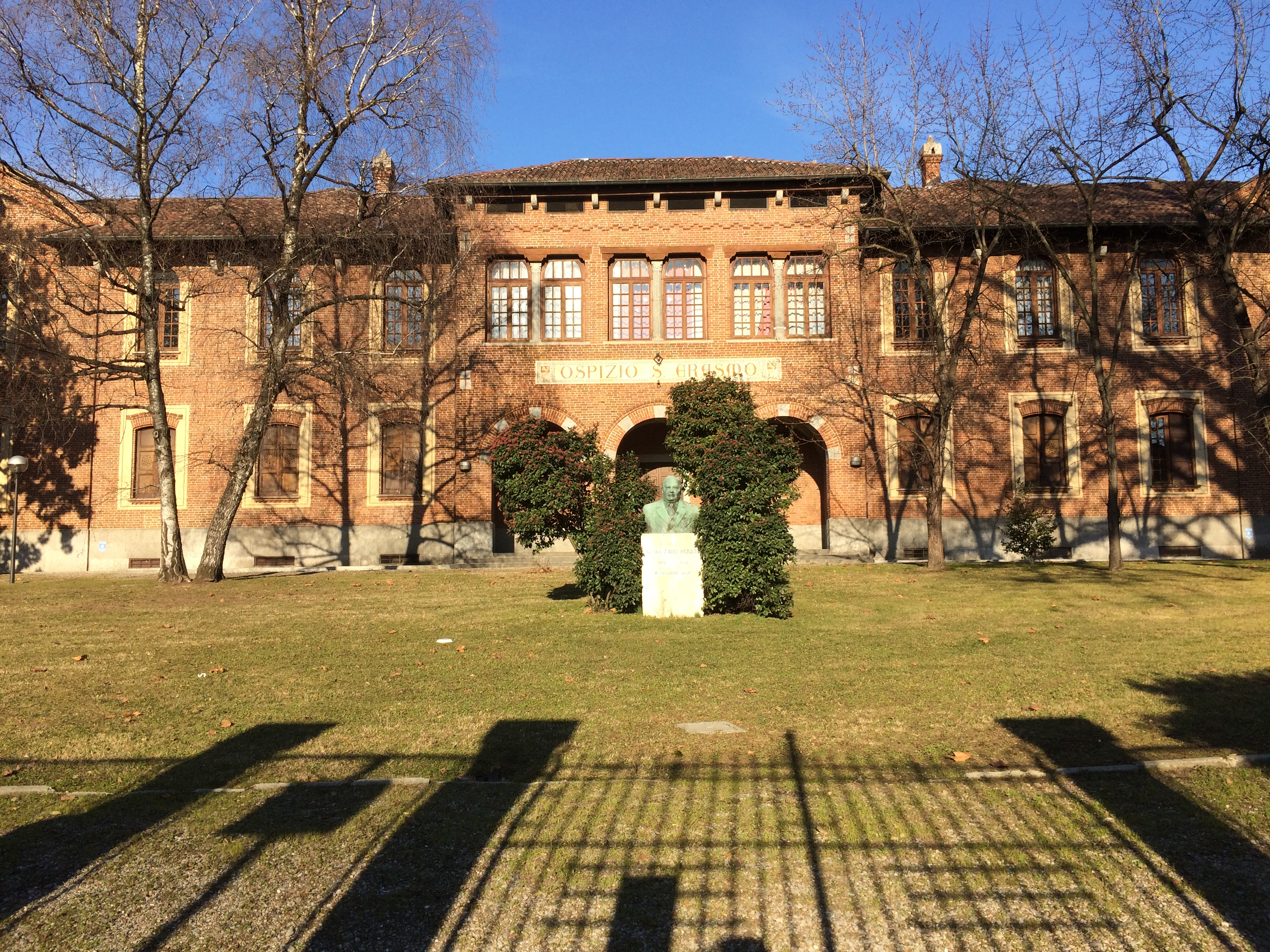
- The modern Sant'Erasmo Hospice
- Interactive map of the Sant'Erasmo Hospice area

General information
- Architectural style: Medieval
- Location: Legnano, Lombardy, Italy, Corso Sempione 34
- Coordinates: 45°35′42″N 8°55′40″E
- Construction started: Prior to 1290
- Demolished: 1926

Technical details
- Floor count: 2
- Reconstruction: 1925-1927

Sant'Erasmo Hospice is a hospice in Legnano. The original hospice, which was built between the 13th and 14th centuries, was demolished in 1926. It was replaced in 1927 by a modern building with the same function and name. It stands next to the church of the same name and is the oldest charitable institution in Legnano.

== History ==
=== Origins ===
In the same place where the Sant'Erasmo Hospice was founded in the Middle Ages there probably existed a very ancient building. In fact, the earliest traces of human presence in this place are linked to a 3rd-century B.C. tomb found by Guido Sutermeister, which dates back to the period of the Roman conquest of the Po Valley.

In Roman times Legnano was connected to neighboring areas by important communication routes, the most important of which was a Roman road built in the 1st century that ran along the Olona River at the modern Corso Sempione and connected ancient Milan to Verbano, the Via Severiana Augusta.

Therefore, it cannot be ruled out that an important landmark building for wayfarers was built along this route already in ancient times, which in medieval times became the Sant'Erasmo Hospice. Indeed, the Middle Ages were marked by intense religious turmoil, which led, among other things, to the construction of many churches, shrines, monasteries and hospices run by religious men, as well as the calling of crusades.

The first document that mentions the hospice of Sant'Erasmo is dated June 7, 1290. This written record refers to a testamentary bequest by a Milanese merchant, Paxius de Ossona, who donated part of his wealth to some thirty hospital facilities in the archdiocese of Milan, including the hospice of Sant'Erasmo, to which he left 20 soldi. On another document, however, it is reported that a year and a half after the date of the testamentary bequest, a certain friar Bernabò was magister of the hospice of Sant'Erasmo.

=== Bonvesin de la Riva and the hospice ===
Some authors trace its origin to Bonvesin de la Riva, a thirteenth-century writer and poet who stayed in Legnano for a long time. His tombstone in fact stated that:

[...] Hic iacet frater Bonvicinus de Ripa [...] qui construxit hospitale de Legnano. [...]
[...] Here lies Bonvesin de la Riva [...] who built the hospice of Legnano [...].

—Funerary inscription found on the tomb of Bonvesin de la Riva

Moreover, on a testamentary bequest of the Lombard writer and poet that is dated August 18, 1304, Bonvesin de la Riva's wish to leave part of his wealth to the friars of the hospice of Sant'Erasmo is mentioned. On the will, in particular, it was also reported that Bonvesin de la Riva had earmarked for the hospice a donation equal to the rent of 100 soldi, money that the monks paid him annually, with the obligation, on the part of the religious, defined in the documents as the fratres, to dedicate a weekly mass to the thirteenth-century poet in perpetuum, that is, forever; this also testifies, among other things, to the strong bond between the hospice and the poet.

Bonvesin de la Riva's connection with the Sant'Erasmo Hospice is also explained by the poet's interest in pilgrims, the sick, and places of healing. In his work Vulgare de Elymosinis, which is dedicated to charity, Bonvesin de la Riva suggests three things that penitents who ask for forgiveness should do (“tre cosse fazan,” as the poet writes): devotion to the Virgin, confession of sins, and almsgiving. Moreover, among the most important actions related to piety that penitents should do, again according to the thirteenth-century poet, are visiting the imprisoned, the sick and the infirm:

[...] One must give alms as much as one can. One must visit the sick, feed them and comfort them [...].

— Bonvesin de la Riva in his work Vulgare de Elymosinis

With regard to the seriously ill, Bonvesin de la Riva, in his work Vulgare de Elymosinis, emphasizes the role of hospitals, places where religious communities cared for people who were unable to meet their most basic needs independently and who often lived in solitude. These places, again according to Bonvesin de la Riva, were also important for passing pilgrims, since they provided the refreshment they needed.

Other authors, who instead rely on a document preserved at the Ospedale Maggiore in Milan, believe that Bonvesin de la Riva merely enlarged, restored or reconstructed a previously existing structure. According to these scholars, the epitaph stating that the hospice was founded by Bonvesin de la Riva was not placed on the tomb until a century after his death, which would cause it to lose some of its historical value, assuming that there is no documented evidence for this hypothesis.

The same scholars also add the fact that, at the time, in the Sant'Erasmo Hospice, there were no friars of the order of the Humiliati, an order to which Bonvesin de la Riva belonged: confirmation of this fact would come from a source of the time that does not list, among the places of headquarters of this monastic order, the Legnanese hospice. Moreover, in this document, the Notitia Cleri Mediolanensis, the Fratres hospitalis S. Erasmi are mentioned and not the Fratres Humiliati. This thesis is also supported, among others, by the scholar Augusto Marinoni, who observes that at that time the friars who ran these kinds of facilities were generally part of the monastic order of Augustinians.

Thus, the documents that have come down to us do not clarify the facts that led to the foundation of the hospice.

=== The dedication to St. Erasmus ===
The dedication of the hospice to St. Erasmus of Formia, according to scholars, is related to the fact that the saint was considered in the Middle Ages to be one of the Holy Helpers, that is, he was part of a group of fourteen saints to whom the Christian community referred in special cases, usually to heal diseases. For this reason, hospitals and shrines were named after St. Erasmus, as well as the other thirteen saints, especially in the Middle Ages.

There is also a popular legend that explains the naming of the hospice after Saint Erasmus. This legend says that from the Legnano monastery of St. Catherine, food suddenly began to vanish. The father superior then decided to establish a guard service to keep an eye on the kitchens. The day after the guard service was established, the religious saw a raven enter through the window. The bird, after taking some bread and cheese from the pantry, went out the window. The religious then followed the crow out of the convent. The friars saw the bird head toward a group of elderly people gathered around a tablecloth and give them the food stolen from the pantry. To thank God for the miracle, the religious congregation decided to build a hospice and dedicate this new building to St. Erasmus, since a small chapel named after the saint was located near the place where the miracle occurred. The crow later also became the symbol of the Contrada Sant'Erasmo.

=== As a stopping place of one of the Roman roads ===
In the Middle Ages, pilgrims traveling along one of the Roman roads heading to Milan had among their stops the hospice of Sant'Erasmo. Legnano was in fact the fourth stopping place from the Simplon Pass and the last before Milan. From Milan, pilgrims then headed to Rome or Venice, where they could embark for the Holy Land. The Sant'Erasmo Hospice thus functioned as a place of shelter, prayer and care for wayfarers, as well as a hospital and orphanage for the local inhabitants. The Sant'Erasmo Hospice was perhaps also a reference for crusaders. It was possible to change horses at the hospice because there was a stable there.

During the period when the Sant'Erasmo Hospice was a stopping place on the Via Romea, Europe was characterized by a large movement of people to the Holy Land. This movement of people brought wealth just about everywhere, and Legnano was no exception. This economic stimulus helped the territories once part of the Western Roman Empire overcome the deep economic and social crisis caused by the barbarian invasions. Another consequence of this steady flow of pilgrims was the emergence of xenodochia and hospices intended for the accommodation of wayfarers.

Specifically, this growth of the local economy affected all sectors, from agriculture to handicrafts, and prompted the inhabitants of these areas, who had once taken refuge in the isolated countryside to escape the barbarian invasions, to seek aggregation again, with the return to the cities and the founding of new hamlets and villages. All social classes were represented by this flow of people to the Holy Land, from the rich, to the poor, to merchants: the latter, in particular, did business with the inhabitants of the areas affected by this migration phenomenon, contributing to the economic growth of the areas they visited. In this context, Legnano with the Sant'Erasmo Hospice also played an important role.

=== The 15th century: the new type of management ===
In the 15th century, already several years after the death of Bonvesin de la Riva, Giovanni Maria Visconti, Duke of Milan, had decreed the centralization of the care of the sick in the local hospitals on the newly established Ospedale Maggiore in Milan. Added to this was a papal bull by Pope Pius II dated December 9, 1456, which decreed the transfer of the management of the small local hospitals that were located in the Milanese countryside and were led by religious communities, to the historic Milanese hospital.

Baldassarre Lampugnani, a local nobleman who had become president and administrator of the charity of Sant'Erasmo, was placed at the head of the Sant'Erasmo Hospice: the Legnanese care facility was nevertheless granted a certain autonomy. In the 14th and 15th centuries on the exterior walls of the main building of the hospice were painted by the Lampugnani brothers some frescoes depicting the martyrdom of Saint Erasmus.

Baldassare Lampugnani was succeeded in 1477 by Gian Rodolfo Vismara, that is, the most prominent nobleman of Legnano at the time, as well as an esteemed physician, who built, among other things, the eponymous palace, the convent of Sant'Angelo and the convent of Santa Chiara in the town. As for the hospice, Gian Rodolfo Vismara administratively restructured it, also doing some restoration work on the building and rebuilding, in 1490, the church of Sant'Erasmo. Gian Rodolfo Vismara also donated to the religious community that ran the hospice, a valuable altarpiece made by Benvenuto Tisi, known as "Il Garofalo," or attributable to Cristoforo Lampugnani (the attribution is doubtful), reproducing a Madonna and Child. On the left of the Virgin is depicted Saint Erasmus, while on the right is painted Saint Magnus, who is also the patron saint of Legnano. Gian Rodolfo Vismara died in 1495, and as his successor the Duke of Milan Ludovico Sforza chose the friar Giacomo Lampugnani.

The Sant'Erasmo Hospice also continued its activities thanks to the income from the sale of wine from the Sant'Erasmo hills (or "Ronchi di Sant'Erasmo"). Wine cultivation in the once flourishing Sant'Erasmo district then went into crisis in the mid-19th century due to some vine diseases. As a result of these infections, towards the end of the aforementioned century, viticulture disappeared from the entire Alto Milanese, and local farmers turned to agricultural production of cereals and silkworm breeding. In other wine-growing areas of Lombardy, the problem was solved by grafting disease-immune vine species (fox grape). The last fields of the Sant'Erasmo hills planted with vines were removed in 1987 to allow the construction, between the Sant'Erasmo hills street, Canazza street and Trivulzio street, of a parking lot to serve the historic and nearby civil hospital, which in 2010 was transferred to another area of Legnano.

Life inside the Sant'Erasmo Hospice was dictated by very precise and strict rules. A document dated May 29, 1477 found in the historical archives of the Ospedale Maggiore of Milan, in this regard, reports that:

[...] [The administration of the hospice of Sant'Erasmo had decided on some rules] to provide that the said hospital and its goods do not pass through sinister hands and that they are well cared for, rectified and ordered both for the honor of God and of that land of Legnano, as well as for the utility of the poor to whom the incomes of the said hospice and its goods are dedicated, providing that the members of Sant'Erasmo be obliged to the shelter of the poor as much as the revenues matter. [...]

— Manuscript dated May 29, 1477, preserved at the Ospedale Maggiore in Milan.

=== The two pastoral visits of the 16th century ===
In 1582 the hospice was visited by Charles Borromeo during one of his pastoral meetings organized in Legnano. As it appears from the documents compiled on the occasion of this pastoral visit, which are preserved in the diocesan archives of Milan, in the front part of the building complex, towards the Simplon road, was located the accommodation structure, the so-called hospitale, which consisted of a two-story building capable of housing up to twelve patients divided by sex.

Behind this building, towards the hills of Sant'Erasmo, were the dwellings of the peasants who worked for the hospice: in this area there were also vegetable gardens and vineyards serving the religious structure. The vineyards, as mentioned, were cultivated with the vine from which the prized St. Erasmus Hills wine was made. The latter, in particular, in 1582, was produced from six vineyards of about 300 perches. The pastoral visit also had another purpose, that of verifying the suitability of the structure to fulfill its function: from the above-mentioned document, no problems were noted, and therefore the hospice was declared suitable to carry out its activities. A documentary evidence dated 1550, thus prior to the report compiled for the pastoral visit of Carlo Borromeo, tells us that the religious complex was at that time surrounded by the countryside:

[...] Hospitale Sant'Erasmi extra burgum Legnani, quarta parte miliaris in loco campestri secus viam Mediolanensem in quo hospitantur pauperes et infirmi et senes praecipue praefati loci. In quo sunt loca (locali) pront infra ad hospitandum pauperes et ibi annexa est ecclesiam [...]
[...] The Sant'Erasmo Hospice is situated outside the hamlet of Legnano, in a rural area at the fourth mile along the road leading to Milan; in it are housed the poor, the sick and the old of the place. In it are rooms that house the poor and a church is attached [...]

A different outcome came with the pastoral visit of Federico Borromeo, which is dated June 13, 1593. The criticisms made in the concluding report were aimed at the transparency with which the hospice was administered, which was not judged to be crystal clear, and at the management structure, which was then modified: in particular, the way in which the twelve members of the chapter were elected was changed. Now these members were to be chosen from among the citizens of Legnano and Legnanello, six from among the nobles and as many from among the people: the twelve members were then to be elected by the vicar forane. The prior, vice-prior, chancellor and treasurer were chosen from among the twelve members; the latter, in particular, managed the hospice's money and assets, which he accounted for by compiling two registers serving, respectively, the chapter and the provost of Legnano. In the same report compiled following Federico Borromeo's pastoral visit, it was also decreed that the hospice could not strictly lend money in any capacity.

=== The 17th and 18th centuries ===
In the 17th century, the Sant'Erasmo Hospice continued to be an accommodation facility that mainly housed indigent and sick elderly as well as passing wayfarers. In 1619, an expansion of the facility was carried out with the construction of a small building that was attached to the main building. The money to construct this new building, the construction of which was directed by master Bartolomeo Crespi, was recovered by putting up for sale some valuable plants owned by the hospice. The purposes had in fact expanded, and therefore the hospice needed a larger structure: the institution had in fact begun, by this time, to distribute bread and wine to the poor of Legnano, even if not hospitalized in the facility, and was equipped with a foundling wheel, that is, a revolving structure that allowed unwanted infants to be abandoned, without being seen from the inside and especially at night. The staff of the hospice was then alerted to the placement of the baby in the wheel by the parent, who kept a proper distance so as not to be recognized, throwing some stones against the entrance door of the facility. Infants abandoned in the hospice were then cared for, baptized sub conditione and transferred to the hospital in Rho or to the Casa di Santa Caterina alla Ruota in Milan.

The hospice based its operation both on income from agricultural rents, which in the 17th century came from 468 perches of land, and on donations from private individuals, which came mainly from the noble families of Legnano. Gian Rodolfo Vismara and Baldassarre Lampugnani, who distinguished themselves, as already mentioned, in the previous centuries, were joined in the 17th century by the local nobleman Attilio III Lampugnani Visconti, who also donated part of his wealth to the Ospedale Maggiore in Milan: Attilio III lived in a building that was located in Corso Sempione on the corner of modern Via Lampugnani, of which only the entrance vault remains. Even in this century the hospice maintained the administrative structure decreed by the aforementioned pastoral visit of Federico Borromeo in 1593, with the management of the structure being operated by the chapter and the vestry board of San Magno. The Sant'Erasmo Hospice was not considered a true hospital and therefore did not have, among its permanent staff, physicians and surgeons: the sick were treated by doctors who came from outside and were paid by the hospice, in which it also provided for the procurement of medicines.

In the 18th century, during the Austrian administration of the Duchy of Milan, the hospice continued its function as a religious facility devoted mainly to the care of the sick and poor elderly. In 1792, the Austrian Emperor Leopold II of Habsburg-Lorraine decreed, through a series of legislative measures, a clear distinction between hospitals and hospices, with the former to care exclusively for the sick and the latter only for the elderly.

=== The 19th century: the Napoleonic era and the Unification of Italy ===
In 1807, during the Napoleonic era, the hospice began to be administered by a congregation of charity, that is, by a council composed of civil authorities: the latter, in particular, were linked to the II Commission of the hospices of the Gallarate district, which was part of the department of Olona. The chapter of San Magno, that is, the local religious body that had managed the facility for centuries, was thus excluded. However, the practical management of the Sant'Erasmo Hospice continued to be the preserve of religious congregations.

The hospice was enlarged in order to be able to provide accommodation for a greater number of elderly people, while retaining its management in the hands of the charitable congregation, which was also supported by the municipality of Legnano. Thus, in addition to income from its own annuities and testamentary bequests, the hospice now also received municipal funds. The charity congregation of the Sant'Erasmo Hospice, in particular, was headed by the prefect of the department of Olona, the provost of San Magno, and the mayor of Legnano, as well as other members chosen from among the most prominent personalities of Legnano and Legnanello, who were appointed by Napoleon at the suggestion of the minister.

This administrative structure was reaffirmed both during the Kingdom of Lombardy-Venetia, which depended on the Austrian Empire, that is, the realm that annexed Lombardy after the fall of Napoleon, and after the Unification of Italy, which was proclaimed in 1861 by King Victor Emmanuel II.

Towards the end of the 19th century, Cesare Candiani, a notary public, became president of the charitable congregation, who would later become the founder and first president of the Legnano Civil Hospital, a facility that would be inaugurated in 1903. To Cesare Candiani the municipality of Legnano would later dedicate the street that runs alongside the so-called “old entrance” of the historic Legnano hospital. Candiani managed to convince Legnano Mayor Fedele Borghi and Legnano Provost Domenico Giani on the need to expand and modernize the hospice by demolishing the medieval structures and rebuilding the building complex from scratch: the three, who were part of the committee of the erecting hospital, were then convinced that the two institutions should have distinct tasks, with the hospital taking over the care of the sick and the hospice continuing to provide care for the elderly, while maintaining the link between the two, with the hospital supporting the hospice, from a medical point of view, in the care of the sick elderly.

=== The 20th century: demolition and reconstruction ===
The goal of expanding and radically renovating the hospice, however, required substantial funds, which then arrived through various channels. Since most of the money raised from popular subscriptions was earmarked for the construction of the hospice, the hospice was in poor financial condition and lasted until 1919, when it was also closed due to the dilapidated condition of its buildings. The elderly hospitalized at that time were transferred to other shelters in the province of Milan, especially in Cesano Boscone.

Shortly after the closure, two handouts unexpectedly arrived in the hospice's coffers, which gave respite to the finances and laid the groundwork for a possible renovation of the structure. The two benefactors were Cristoforo Borsani and local businessman Febo Banfi, co-founder of the Manifattura di Legnano. To these were added funds donated by the Banca di Legnano, a credit institution that had also served as the hospice's treasurer since 1891: this sum raised the hospice's assets to 371,229 liras, which was a sufficient amount to carry out the work of demolishing and rebuilding the building complex. Meanwhile, Fabio Vignati, a local industrialist, had become mayor of Legnano, who donated his own financial funds as well as municipal resources to the hospice. A second reason that led to the decision to tear down the structure and rebuild it lay in the need of the municipality of Legnano to widen the Simplon road: the old medieval hospice was in fact located too close to the roadside.

In 1923, having accumulated sufficient financial capital, partly through other donations obtained, it was decided to tear down the medieval hospice structure. However, a problem arose: preserving, at least in part, the aforementioned frescoes by the Lampugnani brothers painted between the 14th and 15th centuries. Most of these frescoes were lost: some small parts were saved by transferring them in 1926, through the work of painter Gersam Turri, to a canvas support. They are kept inside the church of Sant'Erasmo, at the Legnano Civic Museum and inside the administrative offices of the city's old hospital (the church of Sant'Erasmo was in fact also the chaplaincy of the adjacent old hospital, which was transferred in 2010 to another area of the city).

The design of the new Sant'Erasmo Hospice, which was built in 1924, was drawn up by engineers Angiolini of Milan and Giuseppe Moro, head of the technical office of the municipality of Legnano, with the advice of architect Carlo Bianchi of Milan, a former member of the Lombard commission for the preservation of landmarks. In 1925 construction work was started on the new Sant'Erasmo Hospice under the supervision of engineer Anselmo Morganti. The inauguration took place on October 28, 1927: the end result was a building of 15th-century Lombard architecture reminiscent, in some respects, of the old medieval hospice. About its architectural style, one of the two designers stated:

[...] The architecture of the central building is made up of terracotta facades with stylings, plasters decorated with good frescoes to outline the simple and mullioned windows, wooden eaves for the central part and brick for the heads on the sides. This was done in order to give prominence to the two sides of the building over the rest of the facade, and to keep in a heavier complex, with strong protruding wooden eaves, the central part, while retaining there large openings forming a portico on the ground floor and a loggia on the second floor. A great sobriety of decoration was desired throughout the building, both because of the purpose of the building, because the excessive polychromy in the Lombard style is an exception, except in special cases, and finally because its austere form gives greater grandeur to the general ensemble of buildings.

— Description of the architecture of the new hospice of St. Erasmus made by one of its designers

The new hospice was equipped with 50 beds and related services for the care of the dependent elderly. The management of the facility was entrusted to the Order of Charity of St. Jeanne-Antide Thouret, while the nearby Civic Hospital provided health care for the sick elderly. During the construction of the new hospice, the adjoining church of St. Erasmus was also radically restored: in particular, the exterior walls and the façade were subjected to renovation, which was rearranged in the 14th-century style by laying bricks having a style of the mentioned historical period, at the same time eliminating the previous 17th-century decoration. In addition, a lunette was built over the front door and a blind rose window was made in the center of the facade, the general structure of which results to be "gabled." In fact, the church of St. Erasmus is the reference worship building for the adjoining hospice and was also, as already mentioned, for the adjacent civil hospital before the latter was moved to another area of the city.

The charitable congregations were abolished by Law No. 847 of June 3, 1937, which simultaneously established a municipal welfare agency (E.C.A.) in each Italian municipality. Therefore, the Sant'Erasmo Hospice passed to the related entity established in Legnano. A royal decree by King Victor Emmanuel III dated October 11, 1938 then decreed the transfer of the management of the Sant'Erasmo Hospice to the Civil Hospital of Legnano. On December 23, 1965, the Legnano city council expressed a favorable opinion on the statutory merger between the Legnano Civil Hospital and the Sant'Erasmo Hospice, a favorable opinion that referred to an earlier resolution of the Legnano hospital's board of directors: the two entities thus became a single welfare organization.

The hospice of Sant'Erasmo, in the early 1980s, obtained complete management autonomy from the Legnano Civil Hospital, which then led, in 1988, to the approval of an independent statute whose function was to regulate the organization and operation of the entity. In 1996 a project was prepared to expand the hospice, which began to materialize on January 12, 1997 with the inauguration of the first building, in which it is able to accommodate 17 elderly people, which was followed by two other buildings that were inaugurated on June 16, 2002 and which accommodate, in total, 40 elderly people: with these expansions the total accommodation capacity of the hospice reached 120 beds. In 2003, on the other hand, renovations were completed on the building constructed in 1927 that faces Corso Sempione and was equipped with, among other things, a day care center for the elderly.

== See also ==
- Legnano

== Bibliography ==
- Agnoletto, Attilio (1992). San Giorgio su Legnano - storia, società, ambiente [San Giorgio su Legnano - history, society, environment] (in Italian).
- Various authors (2015). Il Palio di Legnano : Sagra del Carroccio e Palio delle Contrade nella storia e nella vita della città [The Palio of Legnano: Festival of the Carroccio and Palio of the Contrade in the history and life of the city] (in Italian). Banca di Legnano.
- D'Ilario, Giorgio (2003). Ospedale di Legnano, un secolo di storia [Legnano Hospital, a century of history] (in Italian). Il guado.
- D'Ilario, Giorgio; Gianazza, Egidio; Marinoni, Augusto; Turri, Marco (1984). Profilo storico della città di Legnano [Historical profile of the city of Legnano] (in Italian). Edizioni Landoni.
- Ferrarini, Gabriella; Stadiotti, Marco (2001). Legnano. Una città, la sua storia, la sua anima [Legnano. A city, its history, its soul.] (in Italian). Telesio editore.
- Vecchio, Giorgio; Borsa, Gianni (2001). Legnano 1945 -2000. Il tempo delle trasformazioni [Legnano 1945 -2000. The time of transformations] (in Italian). Nomos Edizioni.
