= Civil Hospital of Legnano =

Hospital in Legnano, Italy

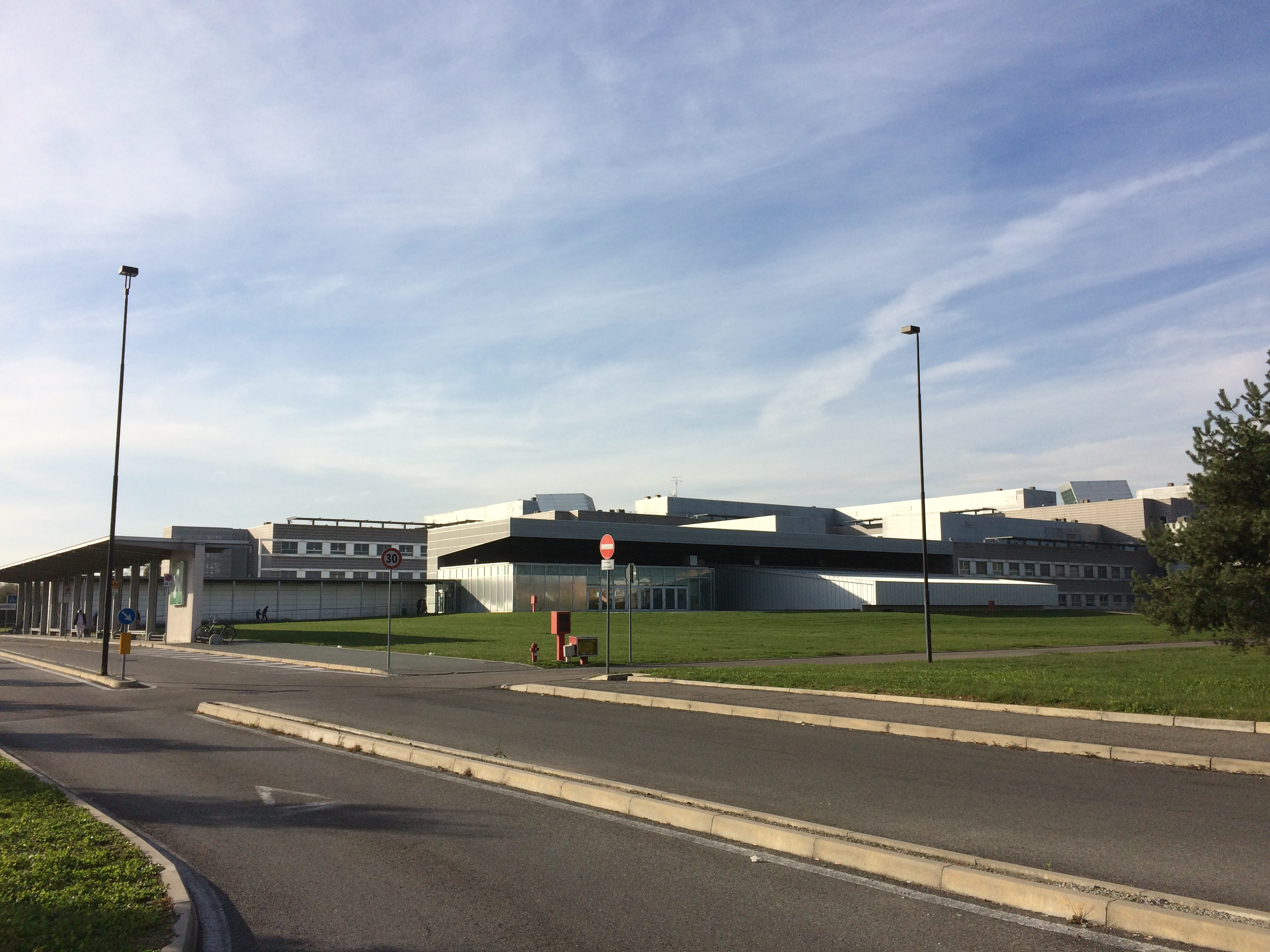
- The new hospital of Legnano on Pope John Paul II Street.

- Location within Lombardy

Geography
- Location: Legnano, Lombardy, Italy
- Coordinates: 45°34′49.83″N 8°53′16.89″E

Services
- Beds: 550 (feb. 2010)

History
- Opened: October 18, 1903

Links
- Website: http://www.asst-ovestmi.it/
- Building details
- Annual number of hospitalizations: 25.684 (2001) Average length of stay: 7.2 days (2001); Number of employees: 1,714 (Dec. 1999); Patron saint: Saint Erasmus; General director: Fulvio Odinolfi; Health director: Cesare Candela Administrative director: Marco Paternoster

The Civil Hospital of Legnano is the largest hospital of the ASST Ovest Milanese and is located in Legnano, a municipality in the metropolitan city of Milan, Lombardy. The first pavilion of the Legnano hospital was built in 1903 in Via Candiani with contributions from the citizens of Legnano, with local industrialists playing a leading role. During the 20th century, the Legnano hospital underwent several expansions. The old pavilions were replaced by the new hospital, which is located on Pope John Paul II Street in Legnano and was inaugurated on February 4, 2010.

== Background ==
=== Health care in Legnano over the centuries ===
For centuries Legnano did not have an organized center of health and welfare care. The first facility located in Legnano that began to partially provide hospital care was the Sant'Erasmo Hospice, which was built at the turn of the 13th and 14th centuries: otherwise the Legnano community depended on hospitals in Milan. The first two hospitals opened in west-central Lombardy were founded in the 14th century in Rho and Abbiategrasso.

The first significant change occurred in 1784, with the founding of the pellegrosario of Legnano, i.e., an organized health facility dedicated to the treatment of pellagra, i.e., a disease that appeared in the early 17th century that was due to the excessive consumption of corn at the expense of meat. The disease was particularly prevalent among the peasant population, given the high cost of meat. The Austrian authorities, who ruled the Duchy of Milan at that time, first planned the Cistercian monastery of Parabiago and then the convent of Santa Chiara in Legnano, a monastic building founded in 1492 and located in today's Corso Italia, between Via Giolitti and Largo Seprio, as the site of the pellegrosario for the Legnanese.

In 1784, through a government decree, the convent of Santa Chiara was deconsecrated and converted into a pellegrosario. The building was particularly suitable because it was provided with its own irrigation ditch, where the water needed to cure the disease could be easily drawn. The direction of the facility was entrusted to Gaetano Strambio, a medical officer who made decisive studies on the treatment of pellagra. In particular, Strambio understood during his stay in Legnano that it was not a seasonal disease, but rather a disease that affected the digestive and nervous system regardless of the season. The pellegrosario of Legnano came to accommodate up to 100 beds and became a real landmark, so much so that it was visited in 1785 by Emperor Joseph II of Habsburg. Some budgetary problems due to the management of the facility led to its closure in 1788: the people of Legnano suffering from pellagra were thus once again obliged to go to the Ospedale Maggiore in Milan despite the fact that their city had been the protagonist of important advances in the study of the disease.

Noteworthy among the Legnanese medical officers, that is, among the doctors employed by Italian municipalities who provided health care to the poor, was one of the protagonists of the Risorgimento struggles, Saule Banfi. The Legnanese patriot, who practiced medicine in the first part of the 19th century, actively participated in the Risorgimento heroic deeds and was arrested during the Five Days of Milan (March 1848). Saule Banfi won the first surgery competition organized in Legnano, the notice for which was issued by the municipality in March 1833. Banfi was not, however, appointed medical officer in surgery, a role that was instead assigned to Stefano Colonetti: this decision was made by Dr. Rinaldi, who chose Colonetti because he had a degree in surgical medicine. In fact, the notice specified that it would be preferable for the future medical officer specializing in surgery to have this degree.

The need to build a real hospital in Legnano was felt in the second part of the 19th century, when the centuries-old agricultural village turned into an industrial town. Until then, the care of the sick was the responsibility of the charitable institutions; after the Unification of Italy, a series of laws obliged the latter to partially change their purpose, giving up the care of the sick, which passed to the local state agencies. Added to this event was the aforementioned transformation of Legnano from an agricultural village to an important industrial center. This led to a conspicuous increase in the population and an increase in the number of cases registered for certain diseases; the latter was mainly caused by the working conditions, which were extremely harsh both in terms of the pace (Legnano workers of the time carried out their activities up to 11 hours a day) and the workplaces, which were damp, poorly lit and, more generally, unhealthy, not to mention the fact that child labor was widely employed in Legnano factories, with all the consequences of the issue. All of this caused a significant increase in work-related accidents: this social backlash began to spread among civil society in Legnano the idea that a hospital was needed in the city, given the scale of the problem.

=== The committee for the building of the hospital ===
In this social and industrial context, the most pressing need for the people of Legnano at the time became the construction of a modern hospital. Until then, the vast majority of the people of Legnano suffering from serious illnesses were obliged, as already mentioned, to go to the Ospedale Maggiore in Milan. In order to travel to the hospital in the Lombard metropolis, the sick Legnanese had to endure a long journey on often uncovered wagons traveling along rather bumpy roads. Instead, for less serious illnesses or diseases, three medical officers and two pharmacists operated in Legnano. This local health organization, with the constant increase in population and with the aggravation of labor-related diseases in Legnano's industries, became obsolete: therefore, the idea that Legnano needed a proper hospital, organized according to modern criteria, began to mature more and more.

The first concrete initiative aimed at building the hospital is indirectly related to the visit that Giuseppe Garibaldi made to Legnano on June 16, 1862. During the speech he delivered, the Hero of Two Worlds invited the people of Legnano to erect a monument dedicated to the Battle of Legnano (May 29, 1176). To build this monument, the municipality of Legnano allocated 10,000 liras. The first monument, which was unveiled on May 29, 1876 on the seventh centenary of the battle, remained intact for a short time: due to the curtailment of the allocated sum, the monument was made of papier-mâché and thus melted with the first rains. The second version of the monument, the present-day monument to the Warrior of Legnano, which was the work of Enrico Butti, was then unveiled in the year 1900. Earlier, just for the realization of Butti's work, a public subscription was opened to raise an adequate amount of funds. However, not everyone agreed with the lavish spending on the monument. Legnano city councilor Leopoldo Sconfietti pronounced, during the city council meeting of April 19, 1897, these words:

Glorious deeds, rather than with monuments of stone and bronze, would be better illustrated by the establishment of charitable works as would be for Legnano the foundation of a hospital dedicated to the victory of 1176.

— Leopoldo Sconfietti

Mayor Fedele Borghi responded by pointing out that the money raised for the erection of the monument could not change its intended use, notwithstanding the need to build the hospital. The discussion, which had now begun, continued in the newspapers of the time, which began to give strong emphasis to this need for Legnano. As a consequence, a few weeks after Leopoldo Sconfietti's aforementioned speech in the city council, a committee, albeit unofficial, was created for the future hospital. Among its initiatives was to raise awareness of this need by distributing leaflets and posting posters along city streets. An excerpt from a poster, which was signed by eight prominent Legnano personalities, read:

They are making an urgent appeal to all citizens to give money, a lot of money, so that even if the hospital is not built, there will always be the satisfaction of having at least laid the cornerstone. It would be a great event.

— Excerpt from the poster of the committee for the future hospital

The goal was finally achieved: both the municipal administration and the public opinion became aware of this need of the Legnano community.

=== The fund-raising committee ===
At the turn of the 19th and 20th centuries, it was rare for city authorities to turn to central state bodies for funds to carry out their public works. Instead, popular subscriptions, or the raising of funds through donations from private individuals, industries, associations, etc were very common.

Even for the construction of the civil hospital in Legnano, it was chosen to organize a popular subscription. The first concrete step in setting aside the necessary sum for the building of this work was a charity dance party organized in 1889 during the feast of St. Magnus inside the nursery school hall in Corso Magenta. About 1,000 liras were collected during this event, still a very small sum compared to what was needed, but enough to open a passbook at the savings bank.

The first official step of the Legnano municipality was taken on May 30, 1899, when the city council resolved to establish an official committee whose purpose would be to raise the necessary funds for the construction of the hospital. This committee consisted of the mayor of Legnano, the provost, the president of the Legnano Congregation of Charity and other distinguished people of the city. Notary Cesare Candiani, who was also president of the aforementioned Congregation of Charity and would later be the founder and first president of the Legnano hospital, was elected as chairman of the committee. The municipality of Legnano would later dedicate the street that runs alongside the so-called “old entrance” of the historic Legnano hospital to Cesare Candiani.

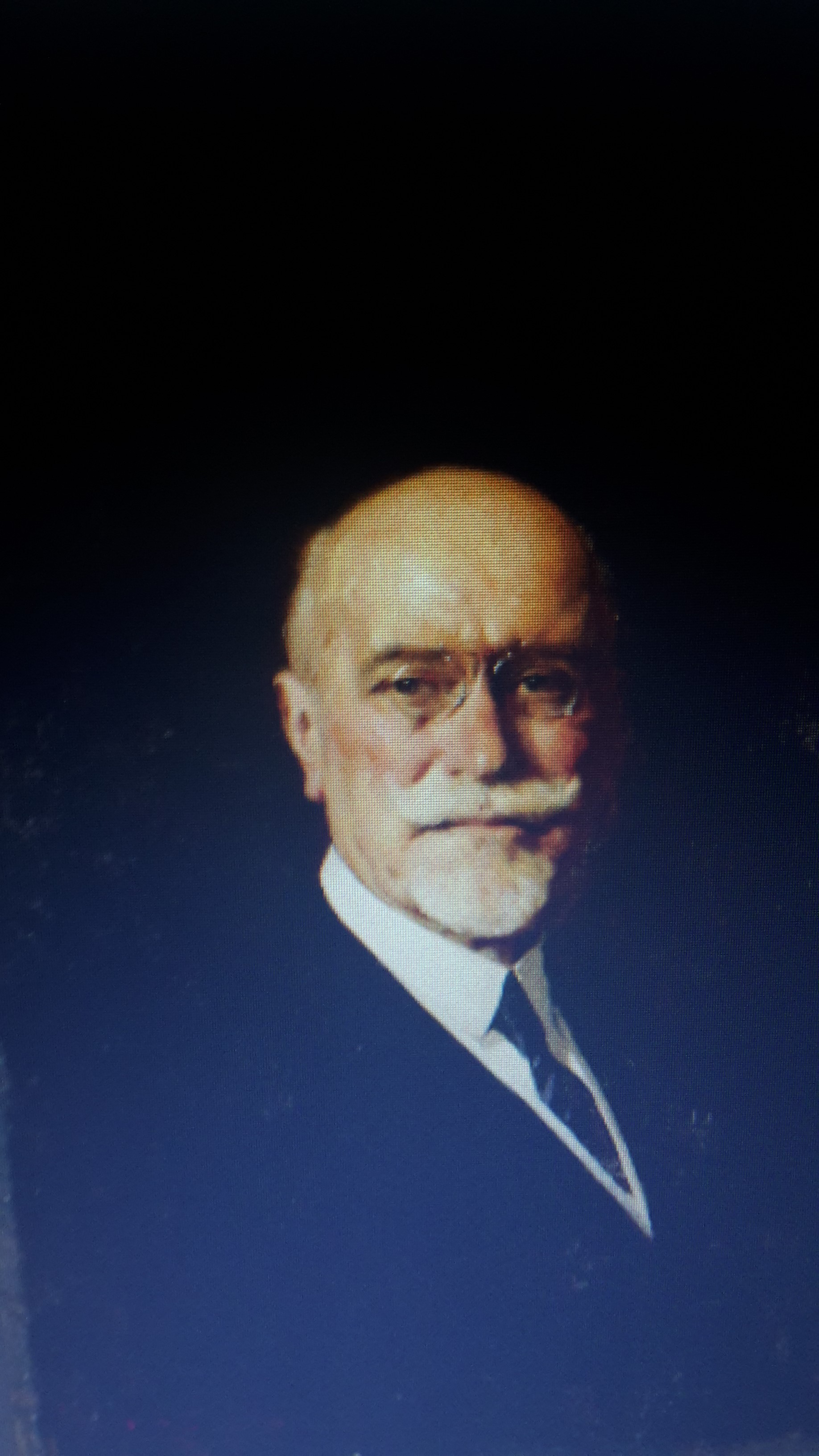
Luigi Broggi, the designer of the historic core of the old Legnano hospital.

During the first meeting of the committee, which took place on February 19, 1900, it was decided to focus on the subscription open to Legnano's citizens and industrialists. Entrepreneurs were then sent a letter asking for donations of funds for the construction of the hospital. The most generous industries were then Franco Tosi and Cotonificio Cantoni: the latter, in particular, pledged to donate an annual sum to the future hospital having in return three sleeping accommodations reserved for its workers. On the other hand, with regard to fundraising among the citizenry, the committee decided to invite citizens to deposit their donations by May 1900 at the counters of the Banca di Legnano.

The committee's initiatives made the amount raised reach 350,000 liras, which was sufficient to get the design phase of the future hospital started. The task of drawing up the design was given to architect Luigi Broggi of Milan. Broggi decided to provide his work free of charge as a tribute to Eugenio Cantoni, an entrepreneur and prominent personality of the Alto Milanese as well as the historical president of the cotton mill of the same name. At this point the municipality of Legnano intervened again, officially decreeing the formation of a new committee, this time intended to coordinate the foundation of the hospital. This second committee consisted of Mayor Fedele Borghi (who assumed the chairmanship), the provost of Legnano Domenico Gianni, Cesare Candiani, Antonio Bernocchi, Carlo Dell'Acqua, Francesco Dell'Acqua, Enea Banfi, Gabriele Cornaggia Medici, Carlo Cornaggia Medici, Giuseppe Calini, Cesare Saldini, Gianfranco Tosi and Leopoldo Sconfietti, i.e., the most prominent personalities of Legnano at the time.

The land on which the Legnano hospital would be built was identified in a vast area of 23,664 m² that is located near the Sant'Erasmo hills, near the hospice of the same name, and was owned by the charitable institution of Sant'Erasmo. The outline plan for the hospital called for the construction of five pavilions plus a building used for management. The architectural style chosen for the new buildings reflected the trends of the time, namely with the organization of services in separate pavilions (the so-called “Tolli system”), the first example of which was the Galliera Hospital in Genoa. Until the 18th century, hospitals were in fact constructed by making single buildings in the shape of a cross, perhaps to evoke the suffering experienced in these places: from the next century the architectural trend changed, with the construction of hospitals with separate pavilions.

The committee's goal was to build the first pavilion immediately, then to follow with the other four. Two surgical rooms were then dedicated to Franco Tosi, founder of the eponymous metalworking company and father of the aforementioned Gianfranco, and Eugenio Cantoni. Contributing to the acceleration of the preparatory stages of the construction of the future hospital were some testamentary bequests. Noteworthy were the donation of Giuseppe Calini, the first mayor of Legnano in the United Italy, who left at the disposal of the hospital 80 percent of his wealth, or 187,000 liras, and the bequests of Gian Battista Tajé and Natale Bianchi, who donated 4,000 and 1,000 liras, respectively.

== The old hospital of Legnano ==
=== The first pavilion ===
In the year 1900, the subscription reached one million liras, an amount that was enough to get construction work started on the first pavilion of the hospital. The foundation stone was laid on May 12, 1901 by Mayor Antonio Bernocchi, while the construction management was entrusted to the head of the municipal technical office Renato Cuttica. Construction work on the first pavilion ended in September 1903 at a total expense that had exceeded the budgeted one of 43,230 liras. This additional expense was shared equally by the members of the promoting committee, who decided to pay out of their own pockets so as not to deplete the funds raised by the popular subscription.

The first pavilion was solemnly opened on October 18, 1903. The ceremony provided for a first moment attended by the citizens and organized in the morning, while in the afternoon a second phase of the ceremony was arranged in which the authorities and prominent personalities of Legnano at the time participated. The poster inviting the citizenry to the inauguration read:

An event that will leave an everlasting memory in the beneficent Legnano now reaches the aspirations of all those who, trusting in the established institution, followed its progress with great interest and awaited its conception with spontaneous shared thinking. On the 18th of this month, at 11 a.m., the first pavilion of the hospital will be inaugurated, which will be entrusted to the expertise of the surgeon-director Professor Ercole Crespi and our municipal doctors, and which will bring so many benefits to the population. Citizens, the social duty of providing rapid and effective assistance, especially to workers who have suffered accidents at work, has been felt by all of us and nothing has been neglected for its prompt application. Come in large numbers to this modest ceremony and reaffirm in the most solemn way the feelings that affectionately bind us to a work so good, noble and necessary.

— Poster inviting citizens to the inauguration ceremony on October 18, 1903

As early as the day after the inauguration, the hospital was operational with surgical ambulance service and medical services provided by two medical officers. The nursing corps consisted of both lay and religious personnel, that is, also of nuns, who specifically belonged to the Istituto Santa Maria Bambina in Milan. The latter mostly had service duties, such as preparing meals in the kitchens and performing wardrobe service. The hospital services of surgery and occupational medicine were activated on November 5, while in the following months the activities were completed with the activation of services related to all other clinical pathologies.

With the aim of concentrating all charitable and assistance activities in the hospital, on December 8, 1904, the Legnano hospital was elevated to the status of a charitable institution by a royal decree signed by King Victor Emmanuel III of Savoy. At the time of its establishment, the Legnano hospital corporation had assets of 747,331 liras and an annual income of 20,000 liras. With its transformation into a non-profit organization, the hospital's administration passed to the Congregation of Charity: the two entities had, among other things, separate budgets and a single board of directors; the latter would later be split into two separate bodies, one for each entity, when the Legnano hospital became a "circle hospital".

Surgeon Prof. Ercole Crespi, a respected professional already serving at Gallarate's Sant'Antonio Abate Hospital, was put in charge of the hospital. Crespi held this position in the Legnano hospital after winning a public competition. In 1905, a small Art Nouveau building was built within the perimeter of the hospital and assigned to Ercole Crespi as his home. This building cost 37,408 liras: again the necessary funds were raised through a popular subscription, this time linked to a charity fishing, and through donations from Legnano industrialists. Also from the same year is the approval of the hospital's first internal regulations, which were ratified on July 5, 1905.

=== From the foundation of the hospital to World War I ===
The first result that was achieved by the presence of a hospital in Legnano was the drastic decrease in the mortality rate. While in the decade 1893-1902 mortality in Legnano reached 24.80 ‰, in the following decade (1903-1912), that is, with the hospital in operation, this figure dropped to 18.24 ‰.

However, this result did not satisfy Luigi Gandini, health officer of the Legnano hospital, who harshly criticized the general sanitary conditions in Legnano at the time; according to him, they were the main cause of the spread of diseases. The latter, in particular, could have been limited by strict enforcement of the sanitary law of the time. Gandini pointed out the very poor quality of water, which was the cause of typhoid epidemics, the poor disinfection of wells, the limited spread of vaccinations, the persistent presence of garbage along city streets, the poor quality and limited civic sewage systems, and the poor control over the sale of milk, which was often sold already spoiled. The latter aspect then led to the emergence of gastroenteritis in children. Because of this contentious attitude, relations between Gandini and the municipal administration became quite strained. Following a report compiled by the city secretary of the Carroccio city, which was requested by the Gallarate sub-prefecture, the Legnano municipality took steps to improve the city's public health. Local industrialists also put remedies into practice, in this case aimed at limiting occupational accidents, the number of which experienced a phase of decline.

On July 23, 1910, a cyclone hit Legnano causing four deaths and several injuries. This hurricane did material damage to a great many city buildings, including the Basilica of San Magno, several industries and the hospital. Specifically with regard to the latter, the hurricane seriously damaged the roof of the pavilion that had opened just seven years earlier. The damage to the hospital was later repaired partly due to a loan of 3,500 liras, obtained from the savings bank, which partially covered the total cost of the work, which totaled 6,095 liras. A second problem that arose almost immediately was that of the staff on duty at the hospital, which almost immediately became insufficient to meet all the growing needs of the hospital. For this reason it was decided to hire new staff and to increase the salary of director Ercole Crespi. These were additional expenses that the hospital was able to meet due to a total tally of financial movements in the first decade of operation that amounted to 58,744.03 liras for revenues and 42,278.47 liras for expenditures. These figures also made possible some extraordinary interventions toward the poor, such as the free distribution of medicines and the allocation of subsidies.

Within a few years of its foundation, the Legnano hospital became famous for the quality of its services, so much so that patients from other parts of Italy also flocked to it. Between 1908 and 1910, patients arrived in Legnano from Rovigo, Albissola Marina, Ronco Canavese, Intra, Vicenza, Soave, Conselice, Argenta, Castellucchio, Zimella, and Chieti. However, the beds available in the first pavilion were not so numerous, as they reached the number of 40. Bearing in mind then that eight beds were kept free for emergencies, the beds actually available for patients were only 32, a number judged insufficient for the needs of Legnano at the time, so much so that many Legnano residents were forced to seek treatment at hospitals in Milan. For this reason, consideration began to be given to the construction of a second pavilion. As for the transportation of the most seriously ill Legnanese to Milan, the Legnanese municipal administration had entered into an agreement with the Croce Verde, a Milan-based volunteer association founded in 1906 that carried out the service of transporting the sick. This association, which opened a branch in Legnano due to the willingness of a dozen volunteers, transported the most seriously ill to Milan by means of a small wagon drawn by a horse or, if the transport was destined for the hospital in Legnano, by two men: these were the precursors of the local Legnano section of the Italian Red Cross. This incomplete and discontinuous service continued until 1910, when the hospital founded the first aid service, which it called the "Blue Cross": through donations from local industrialists, a new litter was also purchased. Previously, the municipal administration had already purchased a litter, which was given to the hospital on loan: this litter, with the advent of the Blue Cross, was intended for the transport of patients with infectious diseases.

With Italy's entry into World War I, the Legnano hospital, like the whole country, experienced a period of great difficulty due to the hardships caused by the conflict, which for the Legnano hospital resulted in the problematic supply of materials and a decrease in the number of employees, some of whom were sent to war zones. Legnano Hospital, during the conflict, did not treat wounded soldiers at the Italian war front. For servicemen in need of treatment, two military hospitals run by the Italian Red Cross were established in Legnano; the Legnano hospital, however, was not totally unrelated to this emergency, as it actively cooperated with the two Legnano war hospitals. They were set up in two Legnanese school buildings, namely in the “Barbara Melzi” Institute (where it was active from 1915 to 1919) and in the “Giosuè Carducci” elementary schools (1915-1918). The military hospital located in the Carducci schools was equipped with radiological equipment donated by the Legnano industrialists: after the conflict ended, when the two schools returned to their original function, this equipment was transferred to the civil hospital of Legnano.

In this context, a mournful event struck the hospital and - more generally - the city of Legnano: in August 1916 Cesare Candiani, founder and the first president of the Legnano hospital, died. Among the commemorations decided upon after Candiani's death was the creation of a plaque, which was later unveiled on December 1, 1918. This plaque, which was placed on a wall of the first built pavilion, reads:

This institute / offered by the generous Legnano / Dr. ca. Cesare Candiani / in founding and directing its fortunes / as its first president / from 1903 to 1916 / directed it admirably. Legal courage, courteous kindness / supreme modesty / will forever be remembered here / by friends and admirers.

— Memorial plaque dedicated to Cesare Candiani

The first pavilion of the hospital was later officially named “Candiani Pavilion.” After Candiani's passing, the Legnano city council appointed local industrialist Antonio Bernocchi as the hospital's president.

=== From the first post-war period to the Second World War ===
Shortly before the end of World War I, the Spanish flu epidemic broke out in Italy. The leadership of the Legnano hospital decided to prepare an emergency plan to deal with this pandemic with the use of the adjacent church of Sant'Erasmo, the military hospital of the Carducci schools and some industrial warehouses made available by local entrepreneurs. In Legnano and neighboring municipalities, the incidence of the disease on the population was low, so this extraordinary emergency plan was never implemented. This escaped danger prompted the hospital's managers to accelerate the construction of the new pavilions: in fact, two buildings had become a matter of urgency, one that was to house infectious disease patients and the other that was to house the pediatrics ward. The total cost to construct these two buildings was quantified as 1,600,000 liras, part of which was covered by the substantial inheritance left to the Legnano Congregation of Charity by local businessman Febo Banfi.

The national elections of October 1919 changed the political landscape: the left, specifically the more radical left, won. During the city council meeting of November 29, 1919, councilor Giuseppe Ratti pointed out:

[...] We should consider whether it is not the case, after the outcome of the political elections, that the Congregation of Charity should resign en bloc, since the present council is an emanation of political parties diametrically opposed to the one on which the great majority of the electoral body had asserted itself. [...]

— Giuseppe Ratti

After various vicissitudes and much discussion, Congregation President Antonio Bernocchi communicated his thoughts in these words:

[...] Since the electoral body of Legnano, for reasons of political correctness and loyalty, has given the majority of the votes to citizens belonging to a political group different from that which appointed the present Congregation Council, it is the duty of the members of the Council itself to resign its mandate to the new municipal authority, in order to leave it free in the choice of the men destined to govern the Congregation. [...]

— Antonio Bernocchi

Bernocchi's proposal was accepted by all the councilors, who resigned. The first problem the new board faced was the deficit budget. This situation had been caused by the war, which had forced the hospital's management to undertake urgent and costly works. In 1922, for example, the deficit amounted to 284,155.45 liras. This deficit was mainly due to the failure of the Municipality of Legnano to pay hospitalization reimbursements for the previous year. After a long dispute, the municipality paid the amount it owed the hospital, which amounted to 206,848.88 liras. In November 1923 Professor Ercole Crespi, director of the hospital since its founding, resigned after twenty years of service following a press campaign centered on the alleged inefficiencies of the facility, accusations that would later prove to be unfounded.

In 1920, the first concrete step was taken toward the construction of the hospital's second pavilion, which was to be used for chronic diseases: Fabio Vignati, a local textile entrepreneur, officially offered to finance the work. Vignati also wanted to finance a second work, namely a small building to be used for infectious diseases. The latter was inaugurated on June 6, 1923, while the pavilion for the chronically ill was taken over by the hospital shortly after its inauguration on October 26, 1927. The Vignati Pavilion, i.e., the one for the chronically ill, was immediately named after Fabio Vignati and his wife Giuseppina and was then used primarily to hospitalize elderly, disabled and indigent people. However, the problem for this type of sick person was only partially solved. Due to Vignati's financial intervention, the hospital did not spend its own funds to carry out this first expansion and was then free to use its own resources to prepare a second expansion. An Art Nouveau building was constructed to house the administrative offices, services and concierge, at a cost of 477,000 liras.

In 1926, work began on the construction of the third pavilion, which would be identical to the first pavilion, the one inaugurated in 1903. The new building would house the surgery department, while the first pavilion to be built would house the general medicine department. This new construction, the cost of which amounted to 1,750,000 liras, was realized through financial contributions from local authorities, industrialists and private individuals through a popular subscription. The most important backer of this work was Antonio Bernocchi, who donated 500,000 liras. The third pavilion was inaugurated on October 26, 1927. In 1930 it was named after Antonio Bernocchi, who died that very year. In his will, Bernocchi left the hospital 1,000,000 lire for the construction of the fourth pavilion.

As time went on, the number of beds grew considerably: from 40 beds in 1903, it increased to 65 in 1914, 90 in 1919, 114 in 1921, and up to 210 in 1927 (the latter figure was reached due to the construction of the third pavilion). The 210 beds in 1927 were divided into 90 beds for surgery, 50 for family medicine, 25 for maternity, and the remaining beds for other medical disciplines (otology, dermatology, ophthalmology, neurology, orthopedics, etc.).

The year 1926 was marked by an important event for the Legnano hospital: it became a "circle hospital," that is, a hospital intended to serve neighboring municipalities as well and not only the city of Legnano. This transformation was made mandatory by a national law. From this time on, the Legnano hospital began to be a point of reference also for the municipalities of Busto Garolfo, Canegrate, Castellanza, Cerro Maggiore, Parabiago, Rescaldina, San Giorgio su Legnano and San Vittore Olona, with the total pool of potential patients amounting at that time to about 85,000 inhabitants. Until this time, the sick in these municipalities were obliged to depend on the Maggiore Hospital in Milan. From 1929, as a consequence of this transformation, the Legnano hospital had a new administrative structure: the board of directors now consisted of nine members, namely, the president of the Legnano Congregation of Charity, five members appointed by the mayor of Legnano, and three members appointed by the prefect of Milan in consultation with the counterpart official of Varese. The choice of these three members - those appointed by the prefectures - was to be made by taking into consideration a list compiled by the podestas of the municipalities that were part of the hospital circle. The president, on the other hand, was appointed by the prefect of Milan, who chose him from among the nine members of the hospital's board of directors.

As a practical consequence of the transformation to a circle hospital, the ministerial commission that followed hospital decentralization allocated 1,000,000 liras to the Legnano hospital for the construction of the fourth pavilion and for the purchase of its furnishings (800,000 liras for the actual construction and 200,000 liras for the furnishings). In 1928 the problem of the transportation service for the sick was finally resolved. Royal Decree No. 2034 of August 10, 1928 allowed the Italian Red Cross to absorb all other assistance associations that performed similar services. In Legnano, in particular, the newly formed local branch of the Red Cross absorbed the aforementioned Legnano branch of the Green Cross. Later, the Red Cross made available two Fiat 1100 ambulances for its Legnano local section, while the premises intended to house the association were given by the hospital.

The 1930s were characterized by the optimization and expansion of hospital activities and the resolution of the most burdensome problems; this was made possible by the hospital's financial resources, which were excellent because of their prudent management, as well as by donations from citizens and industrialists. In 1935 the maternity ward settled in the two floors of the building that also housed the administrative offices, while the pediatrics ward in 1938 was temporarily placed in the building that was once the home of Prof. Ercole Crespi. In the mid-1930s, the first laboratories for chemical-clinical, serological and microbiological analyses were built, ending the dependence on the other departments of the Legnano hospital, while the surgery department was moved to the third pavilion, the one inaugurated in 1927. Such was the reputation of the Legnano hospital, both for the quality of services provided and for the technological advancement of medical equipment, that the University of Pavia decided to have some of its medical and surgical graduates complete an internship precisely in the Legnano hospital. Among the most modern equipment in the Legnano hospital was a radiology cabinet complete with radio diagnostics, electrotherapy, diathermy, phototherapy and an X-ray machine. The surgical department used the electronic scalpel, a technological breakthrough of very recent invention whose use debuted in several hospitals, including in the hospital in Legnano.

Another excellence of the Legnano hospital was the treatment center for lethargic encephalitis and post-encephalitic parkinsonism, which was founded in 1937 under the patronage of Queen Elena and was among the first to be opened in Italy. These centers, which were mainly opened in large cities, were a flagship of the Legnano hospital; among other things, the most common drug used at the time to treat this disease was perfected in this center. This center, which was named in 1941 after Queen Elena, was located in the Vignati Pavilion and could accommodate up to 40 patients.

Given the population increase that had occurred in recent years in Legnano and neighboring towns, it was decided to expand the hospital and significantly improve some services. With the annual contribution of 75,000 liras provided since July 1936 by the municipality of Legnano, and considering Giuseppe Calini's inheritance in favor of the hospital that had not yet been utilized as well as the donation of 500,000 liras by Andrea Bernocchi, works totaling 1,850,000 liras were carried out. In particular, a nursing home was opened in 1938, which was later dedicated to Andrea Bernocchi and served as a fee-based "private clinic" for more affluent citizens (in total, the construction and furnishing of this nursing home cost 470,000 liras) and, also in 1938, orthopedics and traumatology departments were established. Other works were then carried out, including the expansion of the porter's lodge and the reorganization of the hospital's internal spaces. The donation to the hospital of a building adjacent to the area where the old clinic stands, later incorporated into the hospital complex, built in 1922 by the local De Angeli-Frua company to care for frail and rachitic children, originally intended for the children of its employees and from 1925 also for the children of workers from other local companies dates from this period. The building was donated by De Angeli-Frua to commemorate one of its founders, Giuseppe Frua.

In 1940 Italy entered World War II. The only lasting problems that the Legnano hospital faced during the conflict were those related to economic constraints, which prevented the planned expansions of the buildings and the already decided creation of new wards. The only emergency was the one caused by the only bombing to which Legnano was subjected: on the night of August 13-14, 1943, some British planes, heading for Milan, accidentally dropped two bombs on Legnano. One fell in the countryside, while the other hit the Legnanello neighborhood, destroying a house and a workshop. This bomb caused 30 deaths and about 40 wounded, who were hospitalized in Legnano Hospital. Because of the constant air raid alarms, it was decided to connect the various pavilions with underground corridors and to build two air raid shelters.

=== From the aftermath of World War II to the 1950s ===
After World War II ended, the members of the hospital's board of directors returned to the idea of urgent modernization work that had been needed for some time, the implementation process of which had been interrupted by the conflict. The board of directors asked the municipalities that were part of the circle for funds to carry them out: in March 1947, at the end of the collection, the sum of 2,952,497 liras was reached, thanks to which it was possible to modernize the Vignati pavilion to make it functional for the transfer of the isolation ward, enlarge the warehouses, widen the entrance on Corso Sempione making it more accessible to vehicles, and the renovation of the porter's lodge. Also from these years is the establishment of the anesthesia service and the intensive care unit, a measure that anticipated by about 15 years the obligation, decreed by the Ministry of Health on July 1, 1963, to have these services.

Inside the Vignati Pavilion was the Trauma and Injury Department, a department which, however, was not located in a space suitable to meet all the medical needs necessary to have a service up to par. It was therefore decided to build a new pavilion to be devoted entirely to this department: the new building would be constructed between the pavilions of medicine and surgery, so as to form a single horseshoe-shaped building complex. Between the Legnano hospital and local companies there had been - since the foundation of the hospital - an agreement obliging Legnano industries to pay an annual contribution to the hospital to cover the costs of hospitalizations caused by work-related injuries.

In 1949, fundraising began for the construction of the Trauma and Injury Pavilion. The first contributors were workers from the municipalities in the circle, who gave their donations by donating a day's wages. Through other funds raised by the committee of the future pavilion, the sum of 25 million liras was reached. Instead, the Legnanese businessmen decided to pay for all the furnishings and equipment of the future ward, to which were added grants from municipalities, local banks, private individuals, and merchants. Finally, due to the contribution of 60 million liras paid by the Ministry of Public Works and the 90 million loan taken out by the hospital administration from INAIL, in May 1948 they were able to start construction work on the new pavilion. The work was completed in 1951, and from the following year the new pavilion went into operation. The construction of the new pavilion, which possessed 100 beds, made it possible to free 50 beds from the surgery pavilion, previously assigned to the trauma department, which made the first mentioned department reach 150 beds. In 1959 the emergency room, the hospital pharmacy and the gynecology and obstetrics ward were moved to this building. In 1951, however, a new floor was built in the surgery pavilion, which allowed the construction of a new area for operating rooms equipped with the latest technology and which was dedicated to Felice Gajo.

At a ceremony to mark the 50th anniversary of the hospital's founding, on December 20, 1953, the foundation stone was laid for the new pavilion that was to house the new psychophysical rehabilitation center for injured civilians. Three other important initiatives that were taken as part of the 50th anniversary celebrations were the dedication of Via Ospedale - that is, the street where the so-called “old entrance” of the historic hospital is located - to Cesare Candiani, the adoption of a patron saint, namely St. Erasmus, the former titular saint of the nearby church of the same name and the adjacent hospice of the same name, and the adoption by the hospital of a labarum, which was later designed by the painter Mosé Turri. This labarum had two sides: on one was an image of St. Erasmus with a sick person lying on a bed, while the other depicted in a central position the emblem of the hospital (which was created for the occasion) surrounded by the coats of arms of the municipalities that formed the hospital circle. The emblem was later officially granted to the hospital corporation by the Presidential Decree of June 26, 1955.

Another building constructed in the 1950s was the reeducation center for work amputees, which was the first one built in Italy. Inaugurated in September 1955 in the presence of the President of the Republic Giovanni Gronchi, and located on the area once occupied by the heliotherapy colony, it was the first one built in Italy and remained active until November 1982 when it was transferred, due to the lower influx of patients, inside the Legnano hospital. A church was built adjacent to the reeducation center for work amputees, which was consecrated by Archbishop Giovanni Battista Montini of Milan on July 4, 1961, and is still located within the area that houses the psychosocial center, i.e., the department related to the psychiatry department of Legnano Hospital that was relocated to the area of the former heliotherapy colony in 1990.

By the 1950s, Legnano Hospital had reached an extremely high level of service quality and modernity of health care facilities and equipment. Considering also the high accommodation capacity of its pavilions, which reached 600 total beds housed in seven pavilions, the Legnano hospital achieved a recognized national relevance.

=== From the 1960s to the 2000s ===
Due to the relevance and importance it achieved, Legnano Hospital was granted, through a Ministry of Health decree dated July 6, 1960, the first national category of general hospitals. The 1960s were mainly characterized by the quantitative and qualitative growth of the services offered. Due to the enlargement of the number of patients, in whose category almost the entire Italian population ended up, it was also necessary to review the organization of the hospital corporation, especially in light of the sharp increase in admissions. First, the number of beds was increased, reaching 950 in 1964. Next, medical equipment was greatly improved, both quantitatively and qualitatively. Funds to carry out these initiatives were provided by the state, the province of Milan, and the municipalities in the hospital circle: due to the increased movement of money, the budget, which was always balanced, reached the figure of 3 billion liras. In 1964 the hospital administration decided to start the process for a further expansion of the building complex, which would be completed later. The area on which to construct the new buildings was identified on some land free of buildings that was the adjacent land to the area owned by the hospital; altogether, these lands, had an area of more than 12,500 square meters.

The 1960s were also marked by various renovations of existing buildings, including the pavilion that housed the pediatrics department and was earmarked to house the new otolaryngology department, and the Vignati pavilion, which was instead earmarked to house the new ophthalmology department, while the isolation ward, which was located in a building located on St. Erasmus Hill Street on land that is northeast of the hospital complex, was expanded. At the same time, the new urology department was created and housed in Bernocchi Pavilion. Also from the same period was the merger of the Legnano hospital with the Opera Pia Fondazione Banfi, an institution that was founded on August 20, 1921, while in 1964 the division of plastic and hand surgery was created, which over time has achieved national importance. Instead, in 1967 came the opening of the intensive care unit. At the beginning of the 1960s, due to the expansions and renovations, which led to the growth of the number of available beds to 700, the number of hospitalizations grew considerably, even in the face of the population growth of the Legnano area, which reached 125,000 inhabitants in the mentioned period. Due to the large increase in population, however, the Legnano hospital was barely able to meet the needs of the area, so an expansion plan was prepared that would increase the number of beds from 700 to 1,200, a plan that would cost 1 billion 300 million liras: 1 billion was then obtained from Cariplo, while 300 million from INA.

As a first step, the areas needed to expand the hospital were acquired. It was decided to acquire the vacant land that was adjacent to the area owned by the Legnano hospital. First, the area where the Milan-Gallarate tramway depot stood, which would soon be suppressed, was purchased: this land was officially acquired on October 19, 1967. The series of acquisitions was then completed by the aforementioned area belonging to De Angeli-Frua, which had previously donated to the hospital the building that stood there but not the land, in exchange for the transfer of an area located in the San Bernardino area and belonging to the hospital to the De Angeli-Frua company. Added to these new lands was the area occupied by Via Forlanini, or a municipal road that represented the extension of Via Gorizia beyond Corso Sempione, which was suppressed and incorporated into the hospital complex. Specifically, the plan called for a seven-story single-block building that would have a Lorraine cross shape to be built to the right of the pavilion that housed the trauma department. The emergency room and admissions, among other services, would have been moved to the new single-unit building, while two other new buildings would have housed the infectious disease isolation ward, laundry, and kitchen.

The laying of the foundation stone of the single-unit building took place on November 20, 1967, while the first lot of the new building, which was able to accommodate 240 beds, was inaugurated on March 12, 1970 in the presence of Archbishop of Milan Giovanni Colombo. Given the substantial growth of the hospital building complex, the single-unit building also included a new thermal power plant serving the entire hospital that was capable of delivering up to 7 million cal/h. The renovated Legnano hospital was the subject of two visits by the Minister of Health; on April 17, 1972, Senator Athos Valsecchi visited it, and on January 9, 1973, Remo Gaspari. These two events were the litmus test of the importance that the Legnano hospital had achieved. In 1972, on the occasion of the first ministerial visit, the Legnano hospital reached 850 employees, who were distributed in 15 departments. Due to the aforementioned expansion, the Legnano hospital was granted the status of "provincial general hospital" by Regional Law No. 55 of September 3, 1974. Then, due to the transfer of the management of health care from the state to the newly established regions, the funds allocated to individual hospitals grew considerably in the face of the loss of some of the autonomy that the hospitals had enjoyed until then. Instead, the second part of the single-unit building was built starting in April 1973 with an interruption that occurred from December 1975 to February 1976 caused by a problem related to regional funding. From 1974, due to the expansion of the hospital, it was decided to increase the number of employees from 1,084 to 1,360; in that year the maximum number of beds ever recorded by the Legnano hospital was also reached: 1,180. On December 12, 1978, following the enactment of the legislative measure establishing the National Health Service, Legnano Hospital was included in USSL No. 70.

The 1970s were also important for the activation of some health services. In 1972, the departments of neurosurgery and oncology were created, while from the following year the hemodialysis service, which was equipped with six artificial kidneys, came into operation. The establishment of neurosurgery, with its substantial investment in the purchase of equipment, was a major event, so much so that it was inaugurated by Health Minister Athos Valsecchi during his aforementioned visit to the hospital in Legnano. Also in 1973, the nuclear medicine department, which was originally part of the radiology department and later became independent as the "nuclear medicine institute" was activated. The latter, due to the high technological level of equipment, achieved a relevance that went beyond local borders. Also noteworthy was the assignment of a CT scanner, at the time a very recent technological breakthrough that was owned in the Lombardy region by only eleven other hospitals.

The second single-unit building was finished only in March 1988 also due to some judicial vicissitudes. It was followed by a third one, which was completed in 1995. In the 1990s, the area where Legnano Hospital stood reached an area of about 72,000 square meters, on which there were 30 buildings. In 1992, the Legnano hospital, in the wake of the reform of the National Health Service (Legislative Decree No. 502 of December 30, 1992) ordered by Francesco De Lorenzo, was spun off from the ASL and became a hospital corporation, being endowed with wide managerial and organizational autonomy. In 1998, the Legnano hospital corporation was divided into four hospital establishments (Legnano, Cuggiono, Magenta and Abbiategrasso), which had two hospital branches (Legnano and Magenta) as their reference point. From 1998 to 2002, new departments were established, including cardiac surgery, and two new pavilions were built, which were allocated to infectious diseases and the maternity ward.

== The new civil hospital in Legnano ==
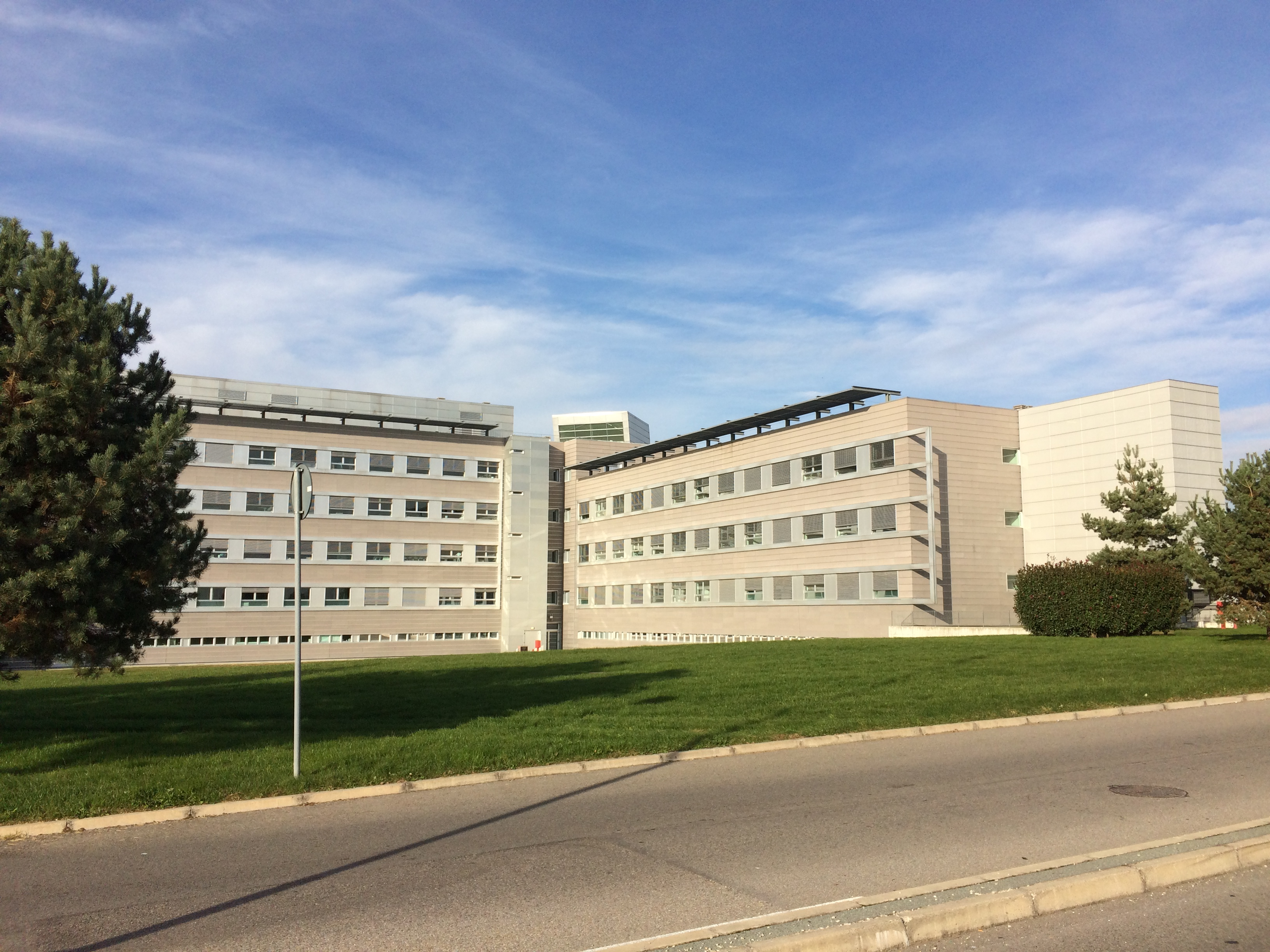
The new Legnano hospital on Pope John Paul II Street.

Given that at the turn of the second and third millennium the Legnano hospital had reached a national level of relevance, it was decided to build a totally new building complex, especially in light of the characteristics of the buildings of the historic Legnano hospital in Via Candiani, which had been built over the previous decades according to outdated criteria (mainly with regard to the separate pavilion structure) and which were difficult to improve especially from a functional point of view unless a large amount of money was invested. Another aspect that prompted the decision to build a new hospital was the location of the old hospital, which is located in a semi-central area of Legnano, with all the problems related to road conditions and lack of parking. A third problem was related to services: with the arrival of the third millennium, the idea of hospital service changed. In fact, it came to a concept that tends, compared to the past, to the limitation of the number of beds and days of hospitalization, in the face of a focus on seriously ill patients, less invasive surgery, and greater attention to diagnosis and home care.

In February 2001, the process to build the new facility officially began with the submission of the feasibility study of the new hospital to the Lombardy region. On March 26, 2002, a variant of the master plan of the municipality of Legnano was approved by the city council, which provided for the construction of the new hospital in the Legnano neighborhood of San Paolo, related parking lots and a large green area, as well as road infrastructure to connect with the surrounding areas; instead, on April 5, 2002, the detailed project was submitted to the Lombardy region. The project involved the construction of a hospital complex built as a single, undivided pavilion building with 70,000 square meters of floor space on five floors.

The new Legnano hospital, which was opened on February 4, 2010, is located on Pope John Paul II Street. The new hospital covers 116,120 m², is surrounded by a 27,000 m² green area and has 550 beds.

== Statistics ==
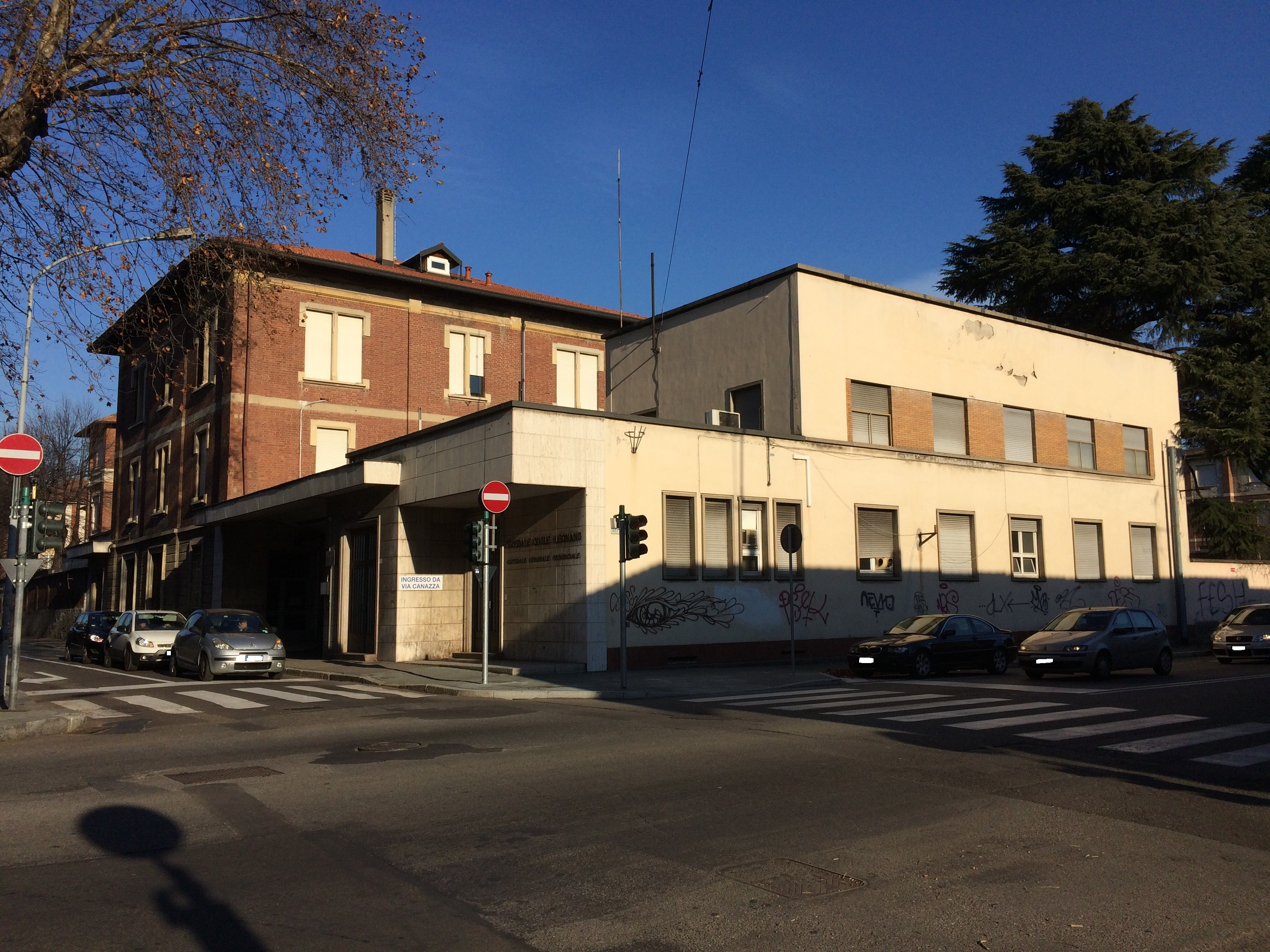
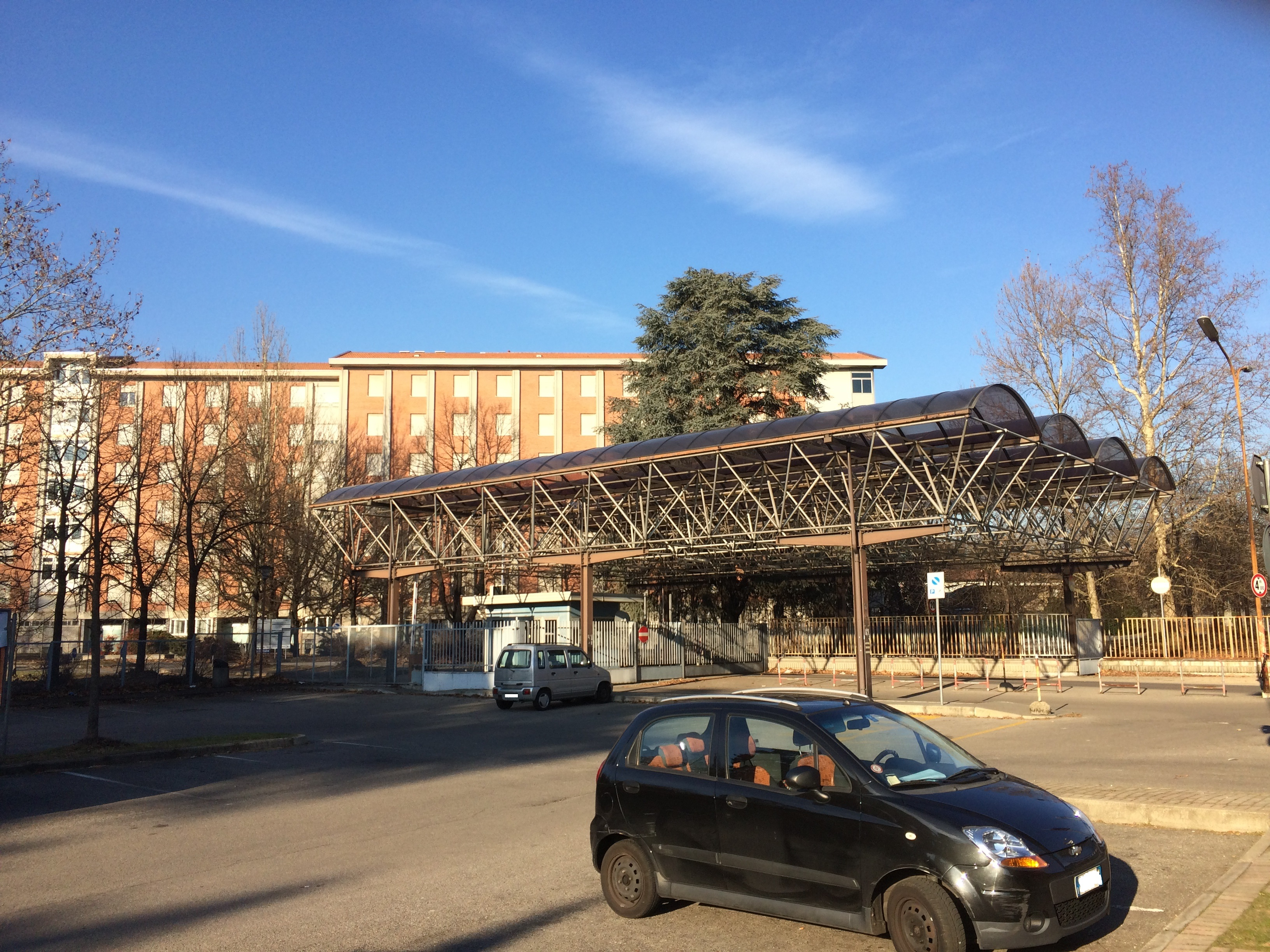
Above, the Via Candiani entrance of the historic Legnano Civil Hospital, and in the image below, the Via Canazza entrance

Relevant historical statistics related to Legnano Hospital are:

Year	Number of beds	Total annual number of hospitalized patients
1903	40	69
1910	60	543
1920	90	574
1930	220	1.827
1940	340	5.460
1950	600	10.013
1960	848	13.844
1970	1.000	21.559
1980	955	24.831
1990	788	22.455
2000	750	26.207

== See also ==
- Legnano

== Bibliography ==
- Vecchio, Giorgio (2001). Legnano 1945 -2000. Il tempo delle trasformazioni [Legnano 1945 -2000. The time of transformations] (in Italian). Nomos Edizioni.
- D'Ilario, Giorgio (2003). Ospedale di Legnano, un secolo di storia [Legnano Hospital, a century of history] (in Italian). Il guado.
- D'Ilario, Giorgio (1984). Profilo storico della città di Legnano [Historical profile of the city of Legnano] (in Italian). Edizioni Landoni.
- Ferrarini, Gabriella (2001). Legnano. Una città, la sua storia, la sua anima [Legnano. A city, its history, its soul.] (in Italian). Telesio editore.
