= Local Health Authority (Italy) =

A Local Health Authority (Italian: azienda sanitaria locale), commonly abbreviated as ASL in Italian, or a Local Health Unit Authority, known as AUSL, is a public organization that falls under the purview of the Italian public administration. Its primary mandate is to deliver healthcare services to a specific territorial area, which is typically at the provincial level. In different regions of Italy, these entities are referred to by various designations, including ASP, ASM, ATS, and AST.

The primary responsibility of a Local Health Authority in Italy is to perform the tasks of the National Health Service, as well as other duties established by law within the specified territorial area.

== History ==
Health services in Italy were initially managed by casse mutualistiche (mutual funds) dating back to the establishment of INAM in 1943, which was officially recognized by the Italian Republic in 1947. These mutual funds provided unequal treatment to workers and the unemployed or underemployed.

However, with the passage of the National Health Service law on 23 December 1978, known as Law No. 833, the provision of health services became the complete responsibility of the state. The services were provided across the country in accordance with the provisions of Article 32 of the Italian Constitution. The law also established the Unità Sanitarie Locali (USL) (Local Health Units) as the primary providers of healthcare services.

Later on, Legislative Decree No. 502 of 30 December 1992 transformed the Local Health Units into Local Health Authorities that were granted autonomy and were no longer centrally organized at the national level. Instead, they were under the authority of the Italian regions.

== Description ==
Local Health Authorities are fundamental pillars of the national health service in Italy, operating as distinct public entities with their own legal personality. They are not merely administrative arms of the state; rather, they function with a significant degree of autonomy across multiple domains, including organisational, managerial, technical, administrative, financial, and accounting matters. This comprehensive independence allows them to operate as genuine centres of entrepreneurial activity, a status that has been formally recognised and affirmed by Italian law.

The legal basis for this is found in Article 3 of Legislative Decree No. 502, issued on 30 December 1992. This piece of legislation explicitly states that "for the pursuit of their institutional objectives, Local Health Authorities are established as companies with public legal personality and entrepreneurial autonomy". This provision represents a major shift, moving the Local Health Authorities from a purely bureaucratic framework to one that embraces principles of efficiency, accountability, and business-like management. The use of the term "companies" (aziende in Italian) in the legal text is particularly telling, highlighting the intent to imbue these public bodies with the operational agility and strategic focus typically associated with the private sector, even while they fulfil a public service mission.

Based on the literal interpretation of this decree, one could classify them as economic public bodies. This classification acknowledges their unique hybrid nature: they are public entities, but they are also driven by economic principles in the allocation of resources and the delivery of services.

However, the legal interpretation and practical application of this status have evolved over time. Since early 1993, a dominant line of jurisprudence has clarified that Local Health Authorities are considered to be entities under the jurisdiction of the Italian regions. While they have their own legal personality and a substantial degree of autonomy, their operations and strategic direction are ultimately guided and overseen by the regional governments. The initial grant of legal personality and autonomy was later amplified to include an entrepreneurial character. This dual nature — being both autonomous "companies" and regionally-supervised entities — defines their complex and critical role in the Italian healthcare system.

== Organization ==
The governing bodies of the Local Health Authority are:

- the General Director;
- the Management Board;
- the Board of Auditors.

Each Local Health Authority is structured into the following complex technical-functional units:

- departments;
- health districts (referred to as basic health district in Campania and district zone in Tuscany);
- hospital district;
- hospital facility.

== Denominations ==
Each Italian region chooses its own denomination for the Local Health Authority.

In Liguria, Abruzzo, Campania, Lazio, Piemonte, and Puglia, they are called Azienda Sanitaria Locale – ASL (Local Health Authority).

However, they have different designations in the following regions and autonomous provinces:

- Alto Adige: South Tyrolean Health Authority (Azienda Sanitaria dell'Alto Adige – ASDAA) or Südtiroler Sanitätsbetrieb (SABES) (in German).
- Basilicata: Local Health Authority of Matera (Azienda Sanitaria Locale di Matera – ASM) and Local Health Authority of Potenza (Azienda Sanitaria Locale di Potenza – ASP).
- Calabria: Provincial Health Authority (Azienda Sanitaria Provinciale – ASP).
- Emilia-Romagna: Local Health Unit Authority (Azienda Unità Sanitaria Locale – AUSL).
- Friuli-Venezia Giulia: University Health Authority (Azienda Sanitaria Universitaria – ASU) and Health Authority (Azienda Sanitaria – AS).
- Lombardia: Health Protection Agency (Agenzia di Tutela della Salute – ATS).
- Marche: Territorial Health Authority (Azienda Sanitaria Territoriale – AST).
- Molise: Regional Health Authority of Molise (Azienda Sanitaria Regionale del Molise – ASReM).
- Sardegna: Regional Health Authority (Azienda regionale della salute – ARES).
- Sicilia: Provincial Health Authority (Azienda Sanitaria Provinciale – ASP).
- Toscana: Local Health Unit Authority (Azienda Unità Sanitaria Locale – AUSL); AUSL Toscana Sud Est (Tse); AUSL Toscana Centro (Tc); AUSL Toscana Nord Ovest (Tno).
- Trentino: Provincial Authority for Health Services (Azienda Provinciale per i Servizi Sanitari – APSS).
- Umbria: Local Health Unit Authority (Azienda Unità Sanitaria Locale – USL).
- Valle d'Aosta: Local Health Unit Authority (Azienda Unità Sanitaria Locale – AUSL) or Unité sanitaire locale – USL (in French).
- Veneto: Company – Socio-Health Local Authority (Azienda – Unità Locale Socio Sanitaria – AULSS).
