= Guido Sutermeister =

Italian engineer and archaeologist

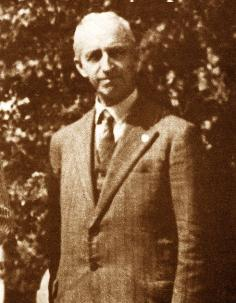

Guido Sutermeister (Intra, November 21, 1883 - Legnano, March 30, 1964) was an Italian engineer and archaeologist.

== Biography ==
Originally from Intra, Sutermeister began to work in his early twenties in Legnano in the mechanical industry Franco Tosi.

Passionate about archeology, he promoted archaeological research at Altomilanese. Together with Alda Levi Spinazzola (Superintendence for Archaeological Heritage of Lombardia), he recovered the Parabiago plate. His investigations have also revealed numerous tombs of the Golasecca culture. The recovery by Sutermeister of some urns in Canegrate in 1926, led to the discovery of a vast necropolis, whose study has identified a prehistoric civilization which was given the name of Cultura di Canegrate. The systematic excavations of this facies were then carried out from 1953 to 1956 by Ferrante Rittatore Vonwiller.

Sutermeister promoted the foundation of the Society of Art and History of Legnano and the local museum that bears his name.

== Literature ==
- Attilio Agnoletto: San Giorgio su Legnano - storia, società, ambiente. 1992.

== See also ==
- Guido Sutermeister Museum
