= Emilio Bozzi =

Italian businessman (1873 - 1936)

- Born: 29 April 1873; Milan
- Died: 21 September 1936; Milan
- Occupation: Businessman
- Known for: Emilio Bozzi & Co.

Emilio Bozzi (29 April 1873 - 21 September 1936) was an Italian businessman, known for his bicycle manufacturing company. He established the Emilio Bozzi & Co. bicycle manufacturer in Milan (1908), the first model being the "Aurora". Also, he had the rights to the Turinese Frejus bicycle brand. With the son of Franco Tosi, who had some patents from the English Wolsit brand, his company made the Ciclomotore Wolsit (1910–14), the rights to which was sold to NSU Motorenwerke AG (1932).

They renamed the company Legnano (the name of Bozzi's hometown) using a sword-lifting legendary warrior (Alberto da Giussano) symbol painted by the cyclist Alfredo Binda, based on the Battle of Legnano. Along with Frejus they had immediate racing success with cyclists such as Eberardo Pavesi (being the manager), Alfredo Binda (1922), Gino Bartali (1936), Fausto Coppi (1939), Ferdinand Kübler (1950) and Ercole Baldini (1956) in the Giro d'Italia, Tour de France and other races until 1965. The company also made mopeds (1954–68), while the bicycle business was acquired by the main rival Bianchi.

== Biography ==
He founded "Emilio Bozzi & Co." in Milan in 1902, which built bicycles. The brand name Bozzi used for his bicycles was "Aurora".

In 1907 Emilio Bozzi began a joint venture with Franco Tosi Meccanica to market Wolseley Italiana bicycles, for which he had exclusive rights. In 1927 Franco Tosi exited the joint venture, leaving Bozzi the sole owner of the Legnano company, which changed its name to "Legnano". The company's emblem was an icon, sketched by Alfredo Binda, depicting the Monument to the Warrior of Legnano. The company produced the "Wolsit moped," manufactured between 1910 and 1914. The patent was sold in 1932 to NSU Motorenwerke AG.

The Legnano (cycling team) team became one of the most successful teams in the history of cycling, winning major successes with Eberardo Pavesi (who later became manager), Alfredo Binda (1925), Gino Bartali (1936), Fausto Coppi (1939) and Ercole Baldini (1956). In 1947, Legnano also acquired the rights to the Turin bicycle industry "Frejus."

A few years later, the company also produced mopeds (1953-1979). The Legnano brand was taken over by Bianchi in 1977. In 1997, the Legnano and Bianchi brands were acquired by the Swedish Cycleurope AB Group, which decided to allocate the former to high-end bicycles and the latter to less expensive bicycles. The Legnano brand was then lost by Bianchi passing, in 2012, to "Cicli Esperia" of Cavarzere.
