= Spinazzola (surname) =

Spinazzola is an Italian surname from Barletta–Andria–Trani, derived from the local town of Spinazzola.

- Alda Levi Spinazzola (née Levi; 1890–1950), Italian archaeologist and art historian
- Leonardo Spinazzola (born 1993), Italian footballer

== See also ==
- Pope Innocent XII (1615–1700), born Antonio Pignatelli, son of the Marquess of Spinazzola
