= Guido Sutermeister Museum =

Archaeological museum in Legnano, Italy, named after Guido Sutermeister

Coordinates: 45.6011°N 8.9130°E

- Museo civico Guido Sutermeister
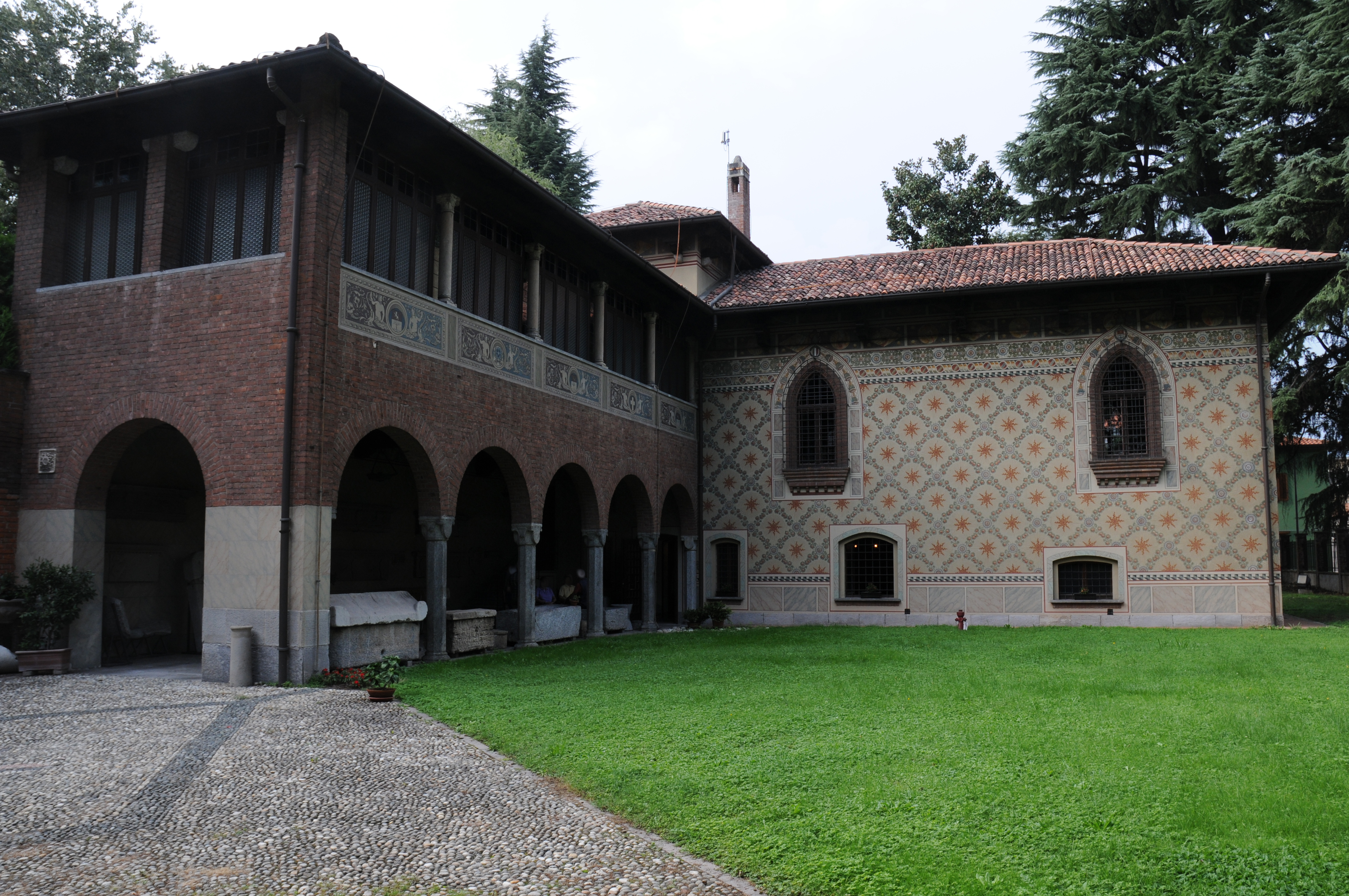
- Established: 1928
- Location: Legnano
- Type: Archaeological museum
- Collections: archaeological artifacts found in the Legnano area and collections resulting from donations from private individuals
- Visitors: 4,104 (2022)
- Founder: Guido Sutermeister
- Director: Teresa D'Antona
- Website: cultura.legnano.org/musei/

The Guido Sutermeister Civic Museum is an archaeological museum in Legnano, in the Metropolitan City of Milan, in Lombardy, named after the archaeologist Guido Sutermeister, who desired its foundation.

== Description ==
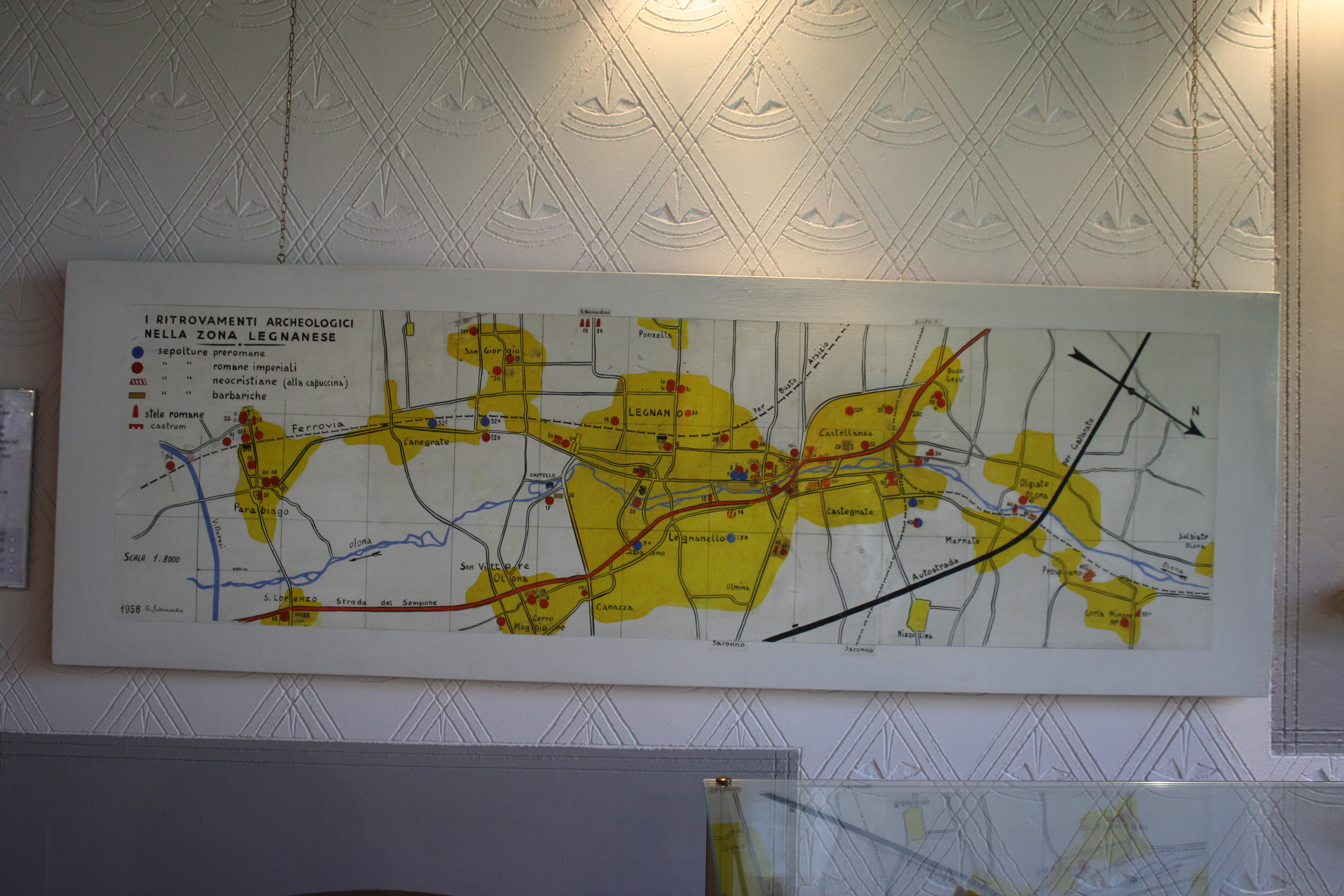
Map by Guido Sutermeister indicating archaeological finds discovered in the Legnanese

It was established in 1929 thanks to the efforts of Guido Sutermeister, who conducted thorough archaeological research in the area between 1925 and 1964. The collections were later enriched with materials from excavations by the Archaeological Superintendency of Lombardy and from private donations.

The Guido Sutermeister Civic Museum preserves, in particular, materials from the city and its surrounding territory. Most of the archaeological finds exhibited in the museum date to a period between prehistory and the medieval Lombard period, with particular reference to the Roman imperial era. The preserved finds testify to the area's occupation since the Copper Age and the existence of a settled civilization since the Bronze Age.

Inside the museum, until 2012, there were also the three large canvases by Gaetano Previati, a Ferrarese painter who lived between the second half of the 19th century and the early 20th century, representing the three key moments of the Battle of Legnano: the Prayer, the Battle, and the Victory. The works were transferred to the "Spazio Castello" section at the Visconti Castle.

In 2004 the Sutermeister Civic Museum became a "certified museum site"; with this recognition, conferred by the Lombardy Region, the Legnano exhibition center officially acquired the status of "museum". It has an exhibition area of about 250 m².

== Architectural complex ==
=== History ===
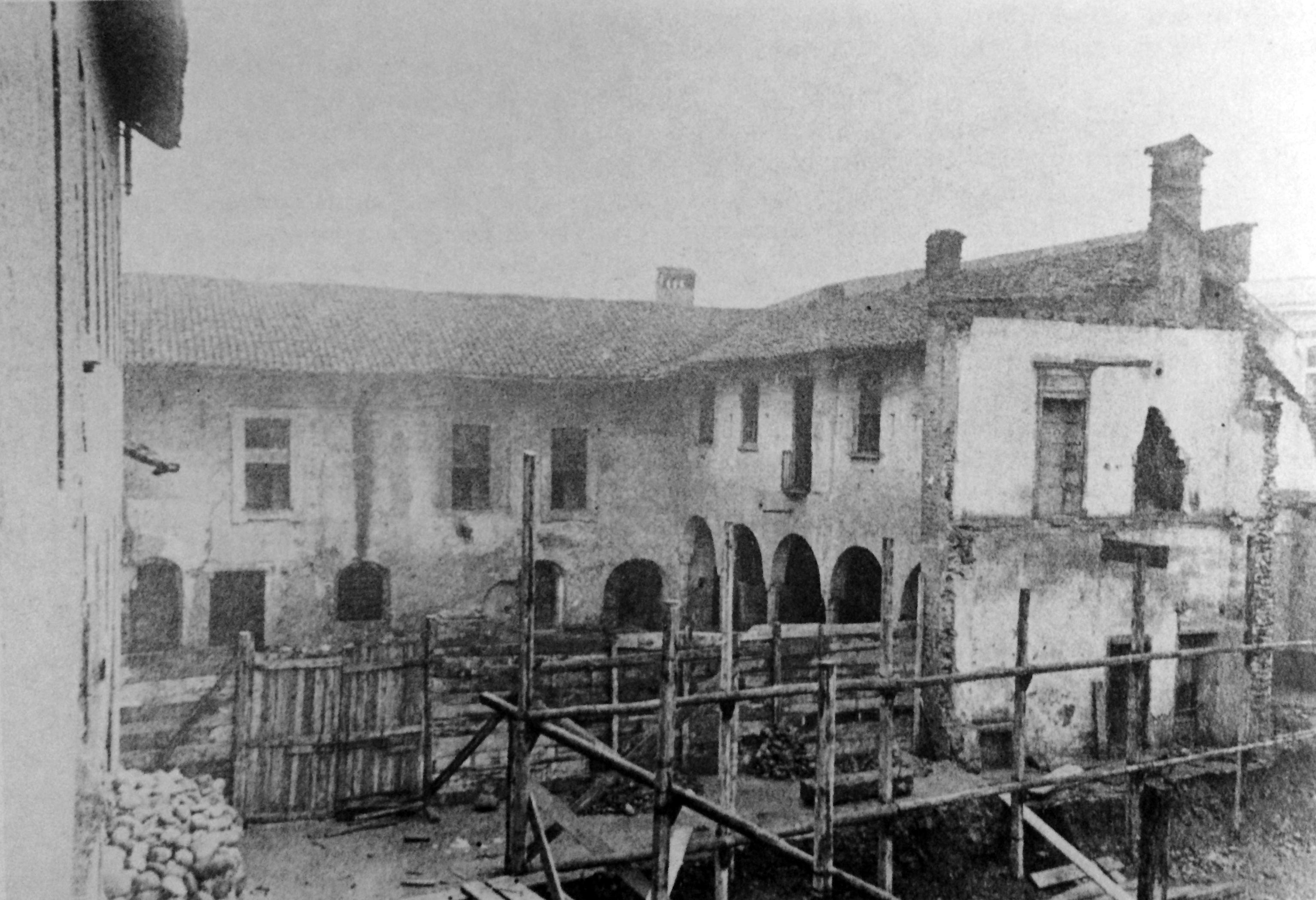
The Maniero Lampugnani during its demolition (1927)

The building hosting the museum reflects the architectural style of the Maniero Lampugnani, a 15th century residence of one of the noble families of the area, the Lampugnani. This noble palace, located between the modern Sempione state road and the Olona river, roughly near Largo Franco Tosi, was demolished in 1927.

The museum, which stands further north than the ancient Maniero Lampugnani, was built near the Convent of Sant'Angelo, now no longer existing.

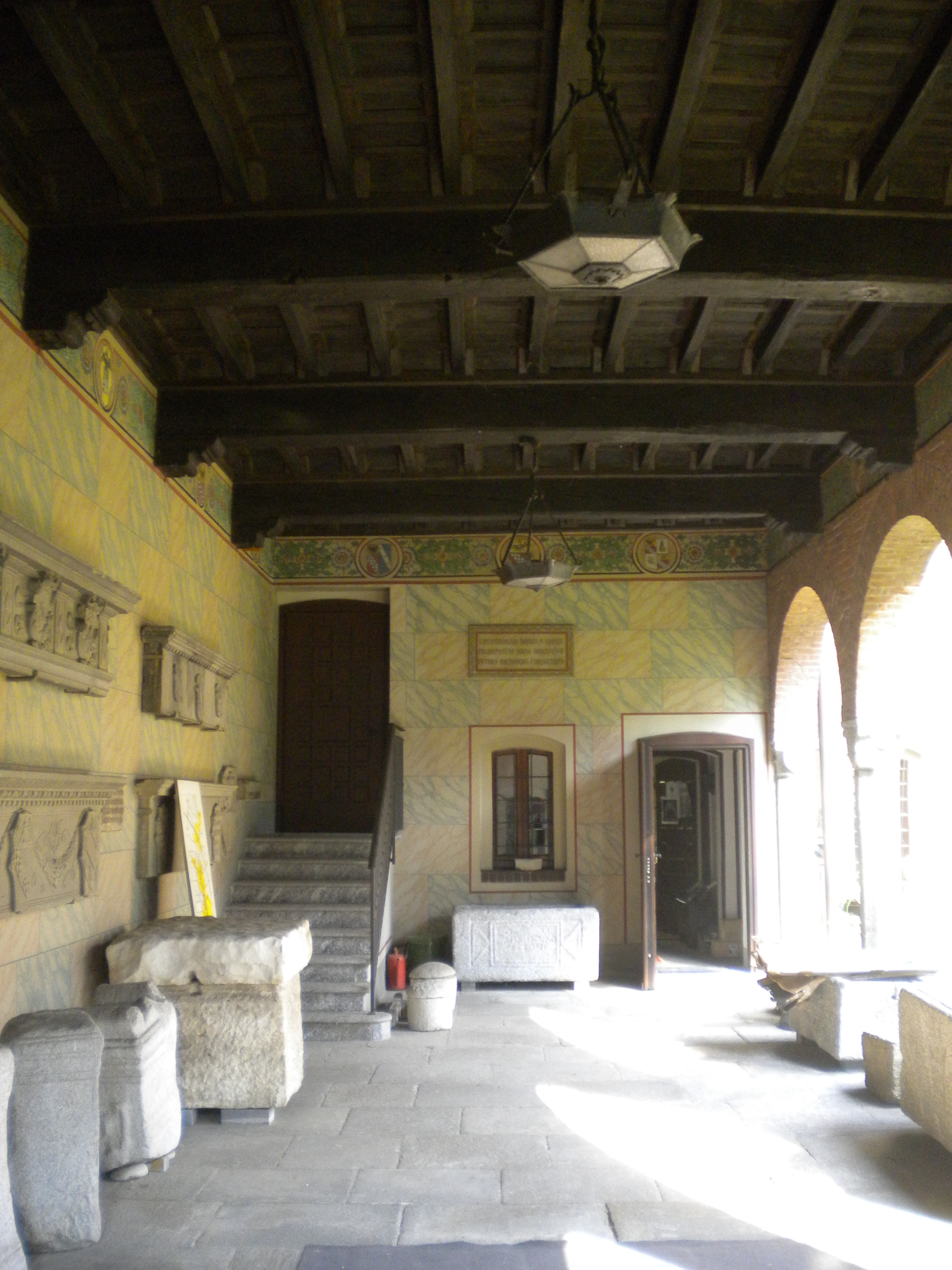
The portico of the building hosting the museum. The wooden coffered ceiling and columns, originating from the Maniero Lampugnani, are visible

For the construction of the museum complex, some original remnants of the Maniero Lampugnani recovered during its demolition were used: wooden coffered ceilings, columns, and fireplaces. A corbel in terracotta depicting a putto was also saved from the demolition. This corbel, part of a window of the Maniero Lampugnani and bearing the carved year 1420, is housed inside the museum.

=== Building ===
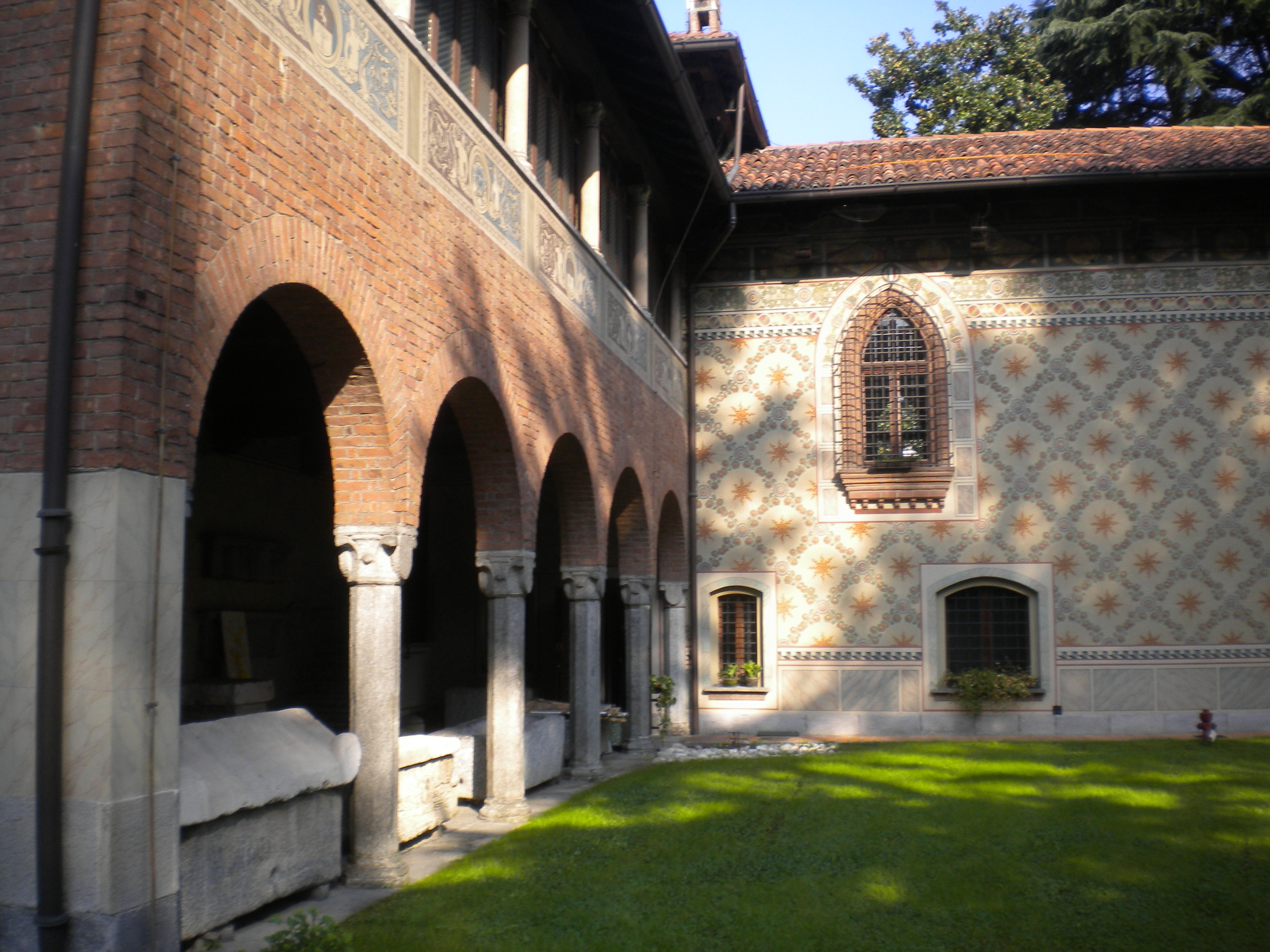
View of the building hosting the museum

The architectural complex, which has an "L" shape and was built in 1928, is divided into two levels and is enriched by a square turret rising above the second floor. The first floor includes a portico with five arcades formed by some columns recovered from the Maniero Lampugnani; this open space occupies the wing of the building extending towards the entrance of Corso Garibaldi. The turret is located at the intersection of the two wings, where the stairs connecting the various floors were also created.

The building's body is made of bricks, while the ceilings are wooden coffered. Some wooden floors, as previously mentioned, belonged to the ancient Lampugnani noble residence. The internal floors, made of stone, are covered with parquet and carpet. The geometric patterns incised as graffiti on the museum's external walls are inspired by the frescoes once present on the walls of the Maniero Lampugnani; these paintings, saved from the destruction of the palace that housed them, are now preserved at the Torre Colombera, an ancient Renaissance building in Legnano that serves as a detached section of the museum. The Guido Sutermeister Civic Museum is set within a small garden; detached from the exhibition building is the caretaker's residence, built in the same architectural style as the main building.

The museum complex has five internal exhibition rooms: the turret room, the study, the hall of honor, the loggia room, and the exhibition room. The portico is also used as an exhibition space.

== Artifacts ==
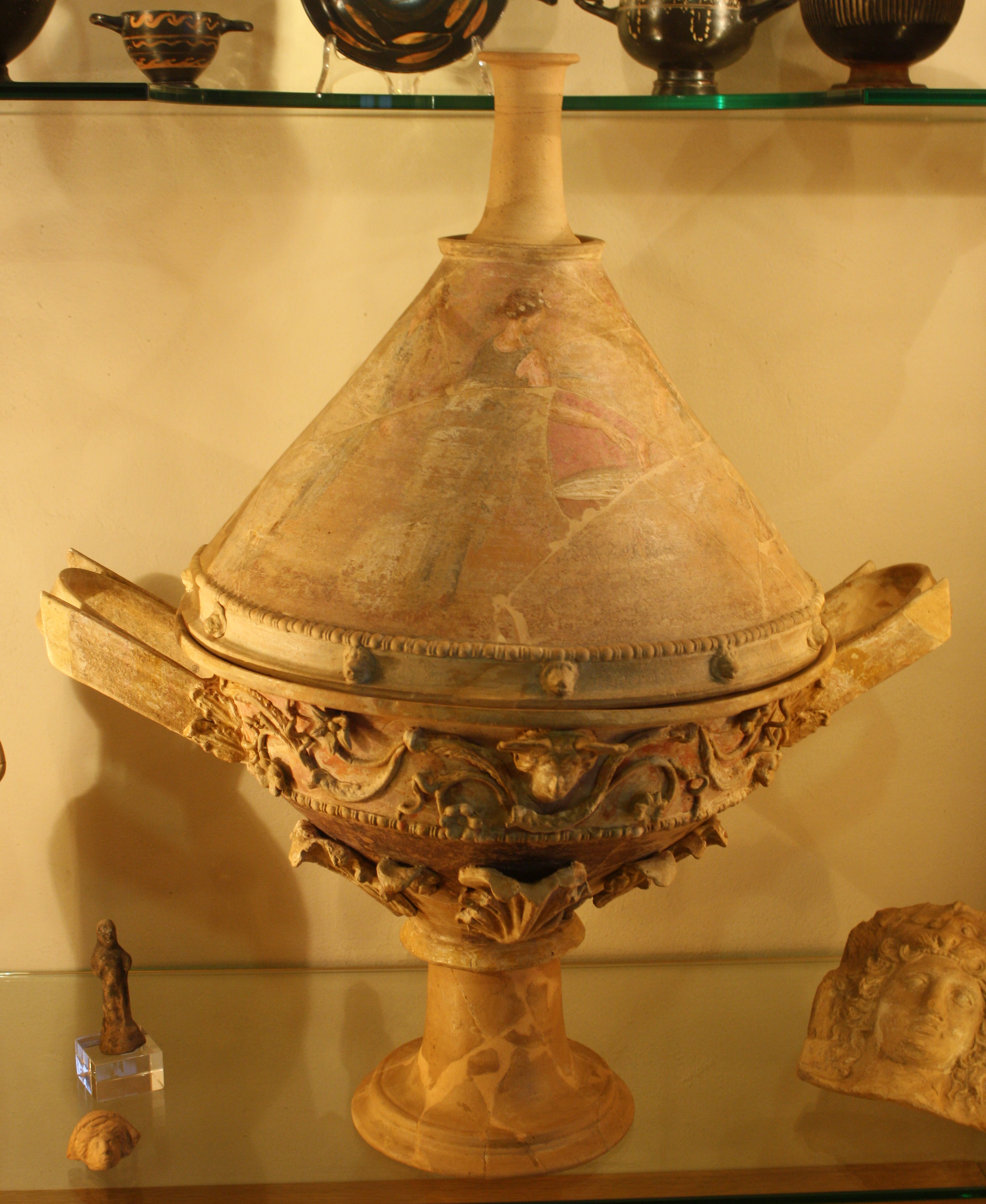
The lekanis preserved inside the "study"

=== Portico ===
The portico houses stone artifacts found in the area. The collection includes, among other things, altars and steles funerary, millstones, a burial in a stone coffin, ossuaries, and a lead anchor, all dating to the Roman era; from the Roman late imperial period are some sarcophagi.

To the artifacts of classical antiquity are added, among others, the remains of some fireplaces that once adorned Legnano's Renaissance residences; these were demolished in the early decades of the 20th century, around the same time the museum was founded.

Regarding the stone material from classical antiquity, some inscriptions are particularly significant: the altars bear their dedications, while the burials are carved with the names of the Roman gens to which the tombs belonged.

=== Study ===
In the study, the collection, once privately owned by Emilio Sala – a well-known local collector of archaeological artifacts – is preserved. After the owner's death, it was purchased by the local association Famiglia Legnanese, which donated it to the museum. The collection consists of archaeological material dating to the centuries before the Roman conquest of Italy.

More precisely, the 57 artifacts preserved in the study date to the Greek civilization of southern Italy, the Etruscan civilization, and the pre-Roman civilizations of northern Italy; they are thus attributable to a historical period between the 9th century BC and the 3rd century BC.

Noteworthy are a fibula in bronze from the 9th century BC found in Lazio, an ornamental breastplate in bronze discovered in northern Italy and dating between the 7th century BC and the 6th century BC, an alabastron produced in Attica in the 7th century BC (but belonging to Etruscan lords), a patera made in Magna Graecia and dating between the 4th century BC and the 3rd century BC, and a lekanis, produced in Centuripe, in Sicily, characterized by plastic and painted decorations and datable to the 3rd century BC. The collection is completed by fine ceramics dating between the 7th and 3rd centuries BC.

=== Turret room ===
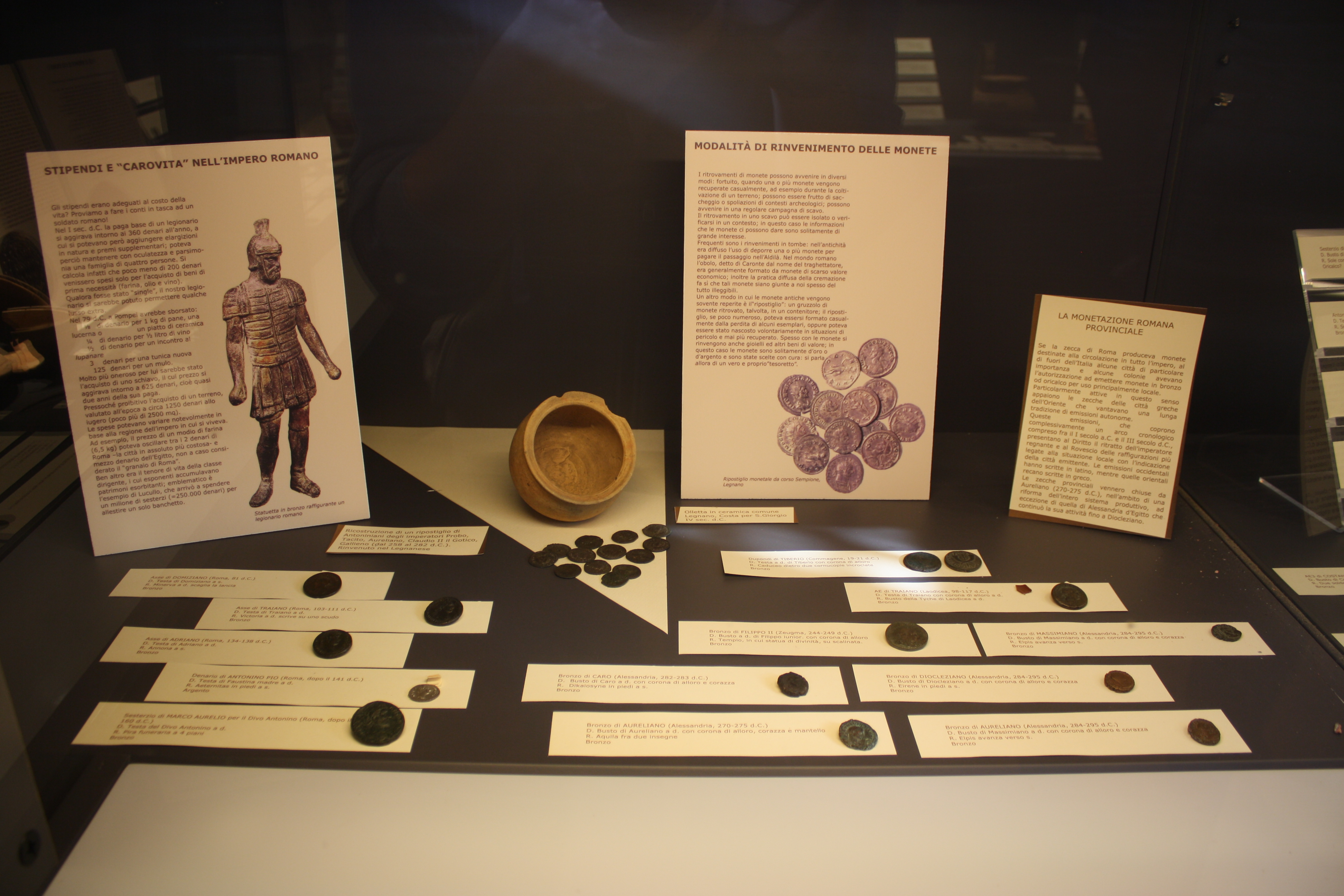
Part of the numismatic collection preserved in the turret room

In the turret room, the museum's numismatic collection is preserved. This collection includes ancient coins (from ancient Greece to the medieval Lombard period) and modern coins (from the Middle Ages to the Austrian Empire). The collection consists of gold coins, silver, bronze, and copper coins found in the area.

Some coins come from private donations, while others were found during archaeological excavations in the territory. Very often, the ancient coins found in the area during excavations have allowed the dating of the entire archaeological site.

This has happened particularly with Roman coins, which were mainly found within necropolises: according to the beliefs of the time, being buried with the deceased, they enabled passage to the afterlife by paying the "obol of Charon", the toll for the ferryman of Hades to transport the soul to the beyond.

For many other coins, primarily those from donations, the provenance is unknown.

=== Exhibition room, hall of honor, and loggia ===
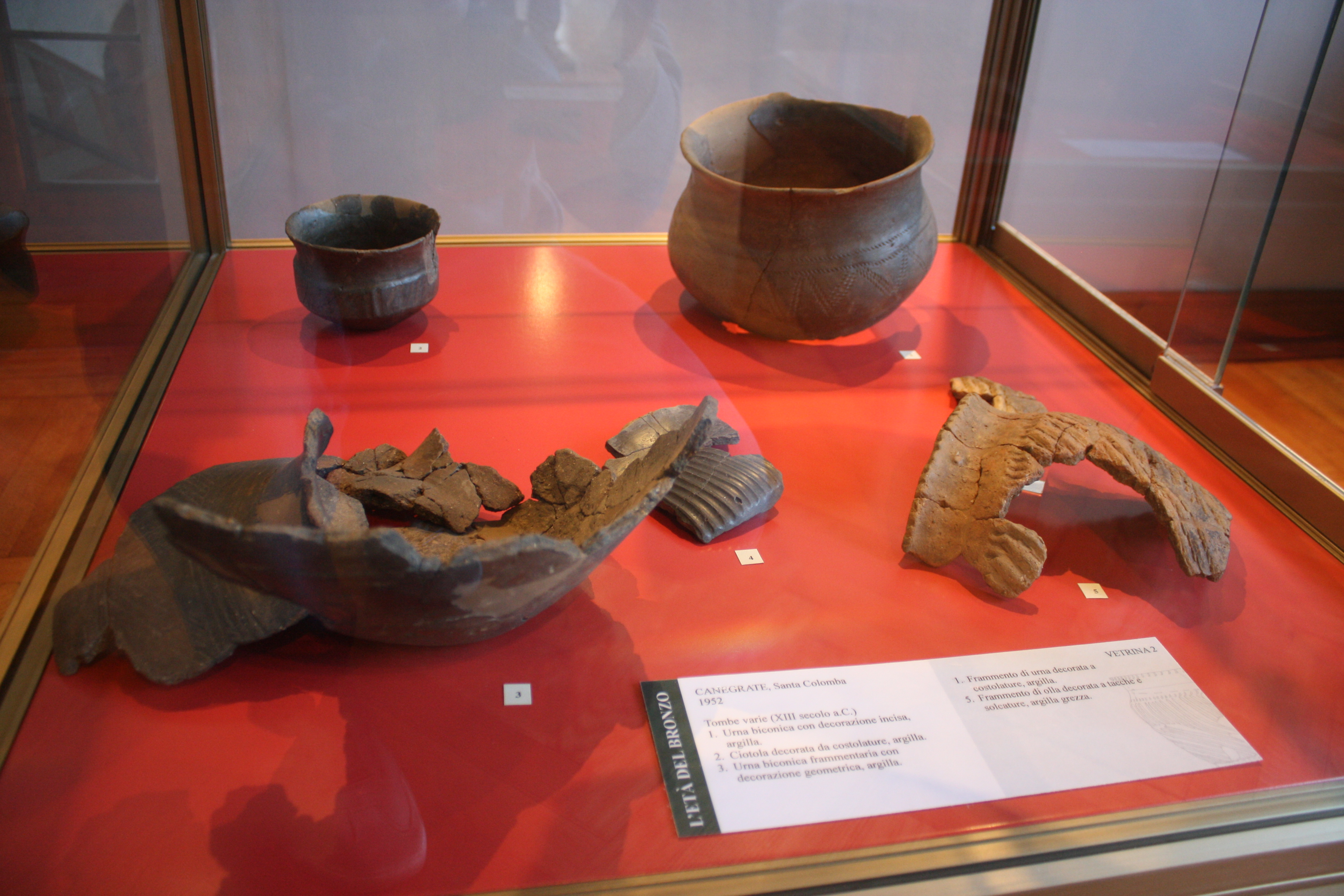
Artifacts related to the Canegrate culture

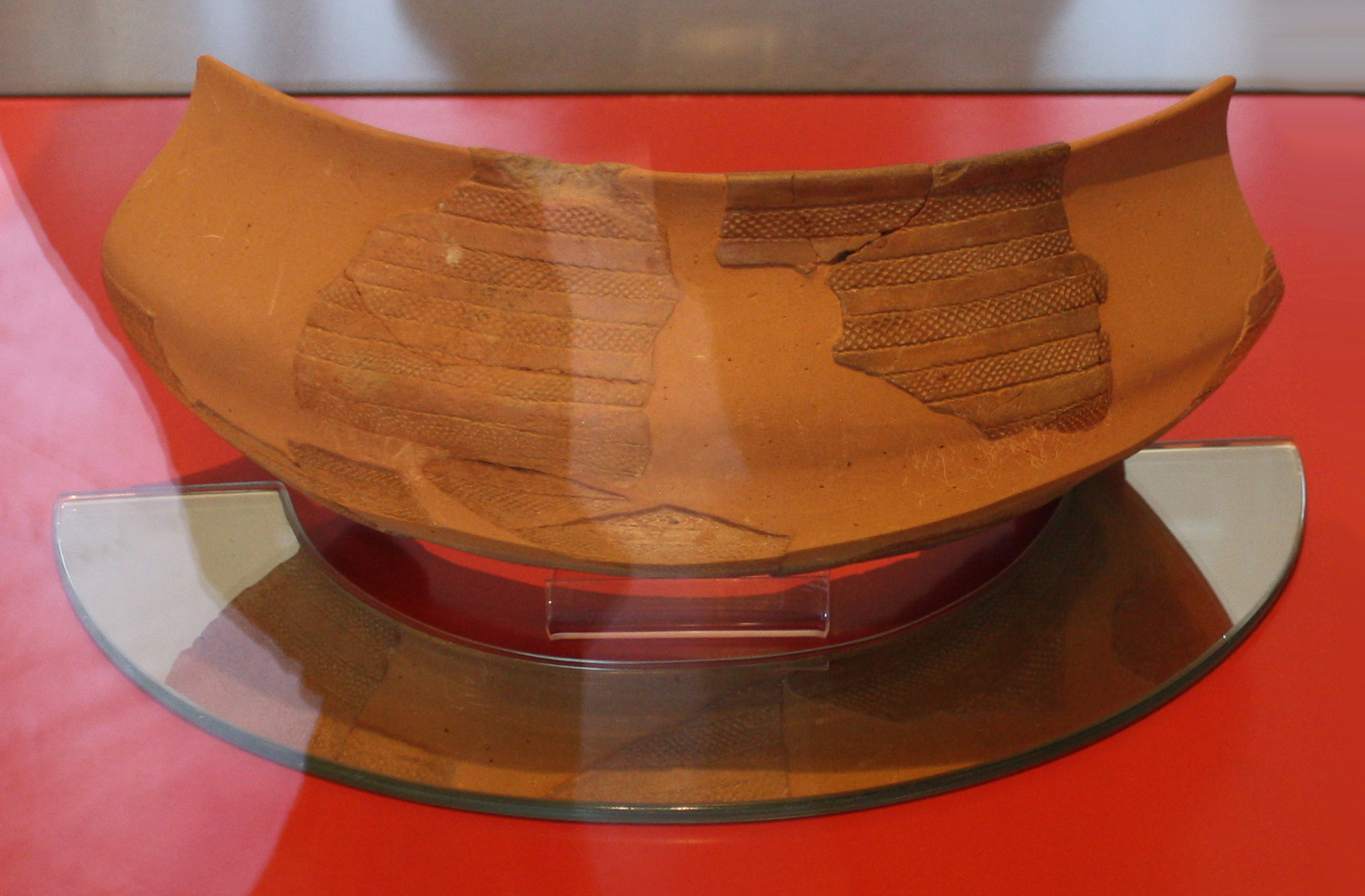
Fragment of a bell-shaped vase linked to the Remedello culture and dating to the 3rd millennium BC: it is the oldest archaeological find in the Legnanese

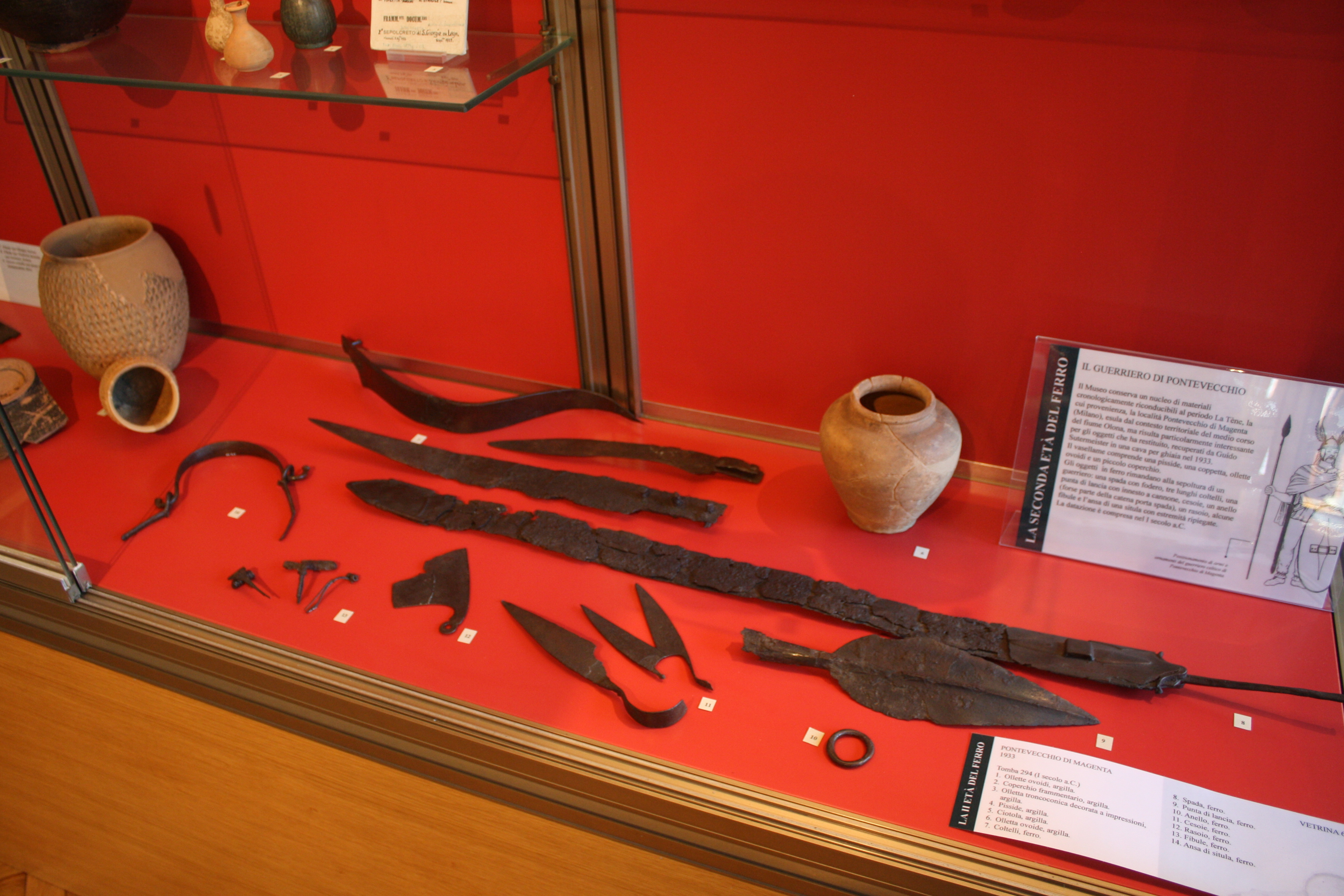
The artifacts of the so-called "Warrior of Pontevecchio"

Inside the exhibition room, the hall of honor, and the so-called "loggia," archaeological finds discovered in Legnano and the surrounding areas are preserved. The collection of artifacts includes pieces datable from the Copper Age to the medieval Lombard period.

The Copper Age is represented by a single piece: a fragment of a bell-shaped vase linked to the Remedello culture dating to the 3rd millennium BC and the oldest archaeological find discovered in the Legnanese region.

The Bronze Age is represented by finds related to the Canegrate culture, dating to the 13th century BC. In the Legnanese, from the same historical period, other artifacts have been found, including remains of dwellings.

The first Iron Age is represented by finds linked to the recent Golasecca culture (6th-5th century BC), while the second Iron Age (4th-1st century BC) is linked to finds attributable to the La Tène culture. From this period, noteworthy is the assemblage called the "Warrior of Ponte Vecchio"; it consists of the armaments of a soldier from the 1st century BC found in the hamlet of the same name in Magenta.

The collection of Roman-era artifacts is very rich: the dating spans from the early imperial period (1st century BC) to the late imperial period (5th century AD). This abundance of finds demonstrates consistent occupation of the area during this historical period, with a significant settled population living along the banks of the Olona river.

From a chronological perspective, the collection in these rooms is closed by finds datable to the medieval Lombard period (568–774 AD). Among the Lombard artifacts preserved, noteworthy is a stamped decorated flask vase discovered in Inveruno, dating to the early decades of the 7th century AD, i.e., the beginning of Lombard domination.

== Bibliography ==
- Ferrarini, Gabriella; Marco Stadiotti (2001). Legnano. Una città, la sua storia, la sua anima [Legnano. A city, its history, its soul] (in Italian). Telesio editore.
- Anna Maria Volonté; Patrizia Cattaneo (eds.). Museo civico Guido Sutermeister Legnano – Guida alle collezioni [Guido Sutermeister Civic Museum Legnano – Guide to the collections] (in Italian). Tipografia Menini.
