= Wolseley Italiana =

Motorcycle manufacturer

- Industry: Metalworking
- Founded: 1907
- Defunct: 1927
- Headquarters: Legnano, Italy
- Products: Aircraft, cars, motorcycles, bicycles
- Number of employees: 250

Wolseley Italiana (official name: Società Anonima Wolseley Italiana – Officine Legnanesi Automobili Wolsit, also known by its trade name Wolsit (an acronym for Wolseley Italiana), was an Italian company active in automobiles, aerospace, motorcycles, and bicycles, operating in Legnano between 1907 and 1927.

== History ==
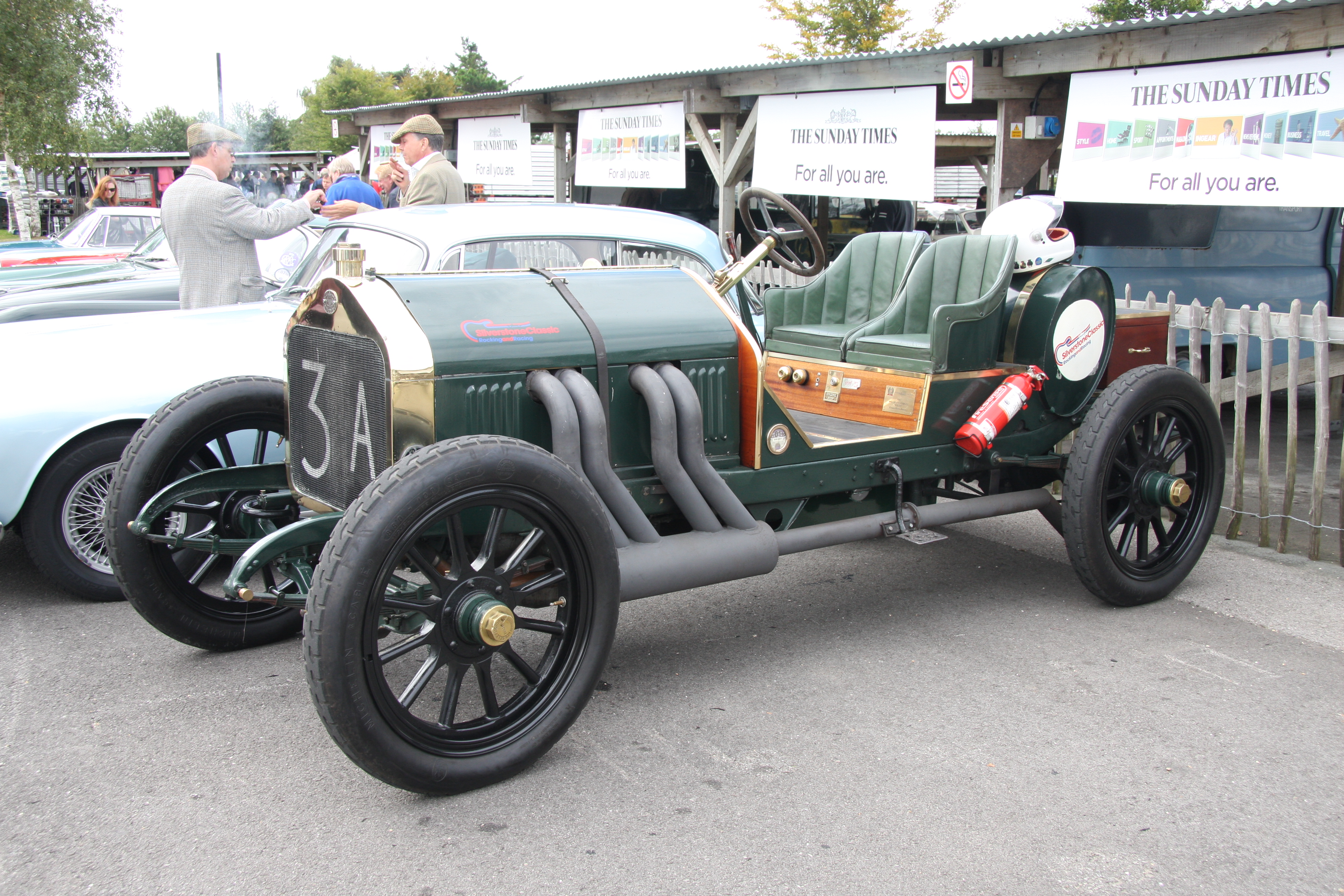
A racing Wolsit from 1907

The company was founded in 1907 in Legnano with the acquisition, by Franco Tosi, of the license to produce and market automobiles and bicycles from the British company Wolseley Motors, hence the name "Wolsit".

The founding of Wolsit involved, among others, the Banca di Legnano, which invested 2 million lire in the venture, and Aermacchi of Varese.

The production facilities were located on via XX Settembre in Legnano, along the Domodossola-Milan railway, in a shed owned by Franco Tosi.

In 1907, some Wolsit cars participated in motorsport competitions. Due to the crisis that hit the automobile sector at the time, car production ceased in 1909, just two years after the company's founding.

Even after the end of car assembly, bicycle assembly continued, still under Wolseley license. Wolsit bicycles were famous for their design and construction techniques.

A few years after the end of car assembly, airplane production began, but it was unsuccessful and short-lived.

The company changed its name to Legnano in 1927, after which the name "Wolsit" survived as a brand for a few decades. From 1910 to 1932, the company also produced motorcycles under the Wolsit brand.

== Models of cars ==
The smallest car model for sale was the 10/12 HP, which was equipped with a two-cylinder engine of 1,775 cm^{3} displacement. Also available were the 16/24 HP, which was equipped with a four-cylinder engine of 3,550 cm^{3}, and the 30/40 HP, which had a four-cylinder engine of 5,555 cm^{3}. The largest model was the 45/60 HP, which had a six-cylinder engine of 8,190 cm^{3}. The last model listed was the 14/20 HP, which was equipped with a four-cylinder engine of 2,587 cm^{3}.

== See also ==
- Wolseley Motors

== Bibliography ==
- Linz, Harald; Schrader (2008). Die Internationale Automobil-Enzyklopädie (in German). Munich: United Soft Media. pp. Halwart. ISBN 978-3-8032-9876-8.
- Enzyklopädie des Automobils. Marken · Modelle · Technik (in German). Augusta: Weltbild. 1997. ISBN 978-3-89350-534-0.
- D'Ilario, Giorgio; Cavalleri, Pierino; Josti, Gianfranco; Negri, Rino; Serantoni, Ildo; Tajè, Marco (1993). Ciclismo a Legnano. Legnano: Famiglia Legnanese.
