= Franco Tosi Meccanica =

Italian engineering business

- Company type: S.p.A. (Public limited company as defined under Italian law)
- Industry: Heavy machinery and energy technology (previously also submarines and boats)
- Founded: 1874 (Cantoni Krumm & C.) from 1894 "Franco Tosi"
- Headquarters: Legnano near Milan, Italy
- Area served: Worldwide
- Key people: Franco Tosi, Eugenio Cantoni
- Products: Turbines, Boilers, Heat exchangers and pumps
- Revenue: 85 Mio. € (2006)
- Number of employees: c. 600 (2008), formerly c. 6000 (1970s)
- Website: www.francotosimeccanica.it

Franco Tosi (formerly known as Franco Tosi & C., now called Franco Tosi Meccanica) is an Italian engineering business currently concentrated on the production of turbines, boilers, heat exchangers and pumps. It is located in Legnano near Milan. The firm was created during the fourth quarter of the nineteenth century by the Italian engineer Franco Tosi (1858 – 1898).

== History and products ==
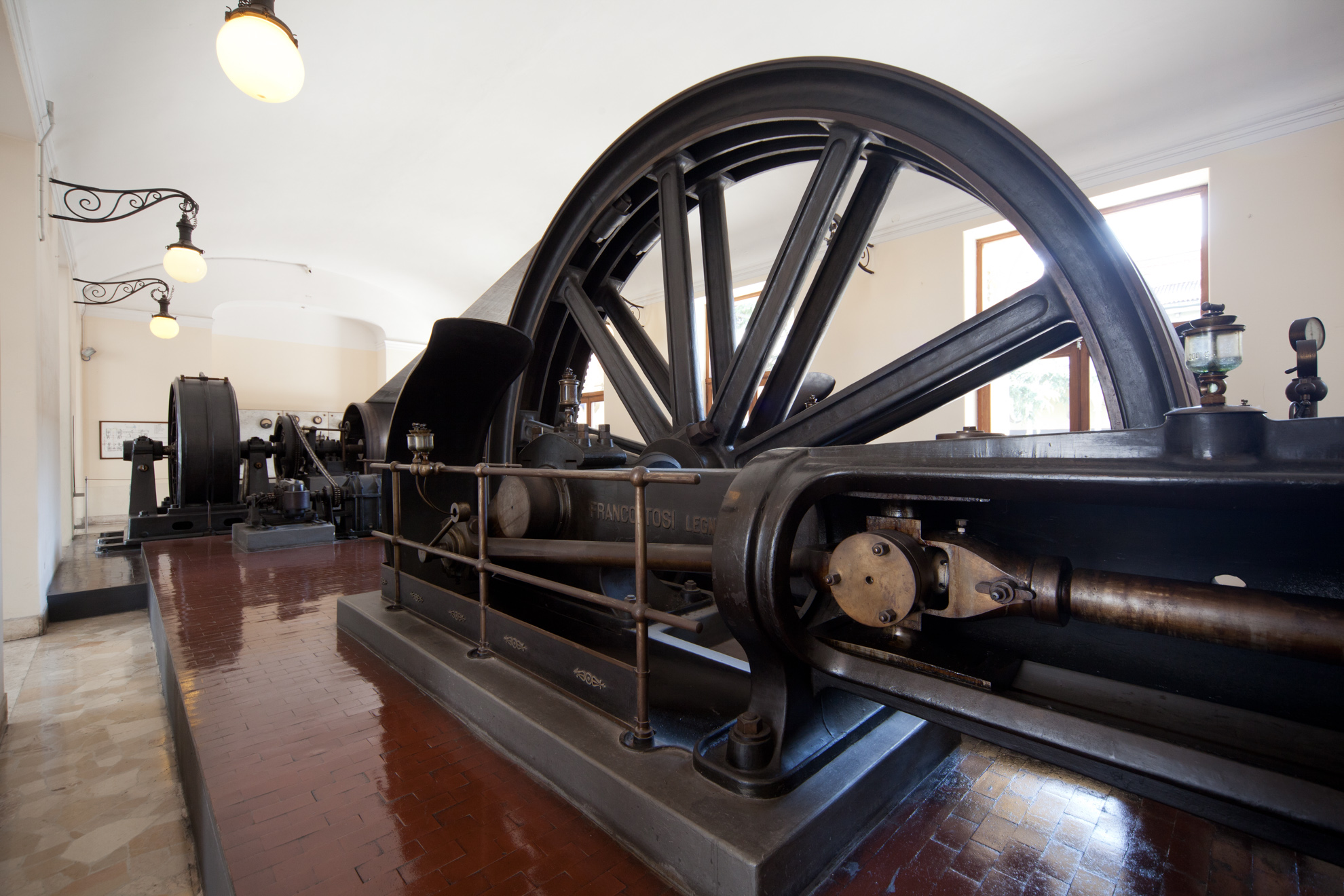
Thermoelectric generator "Regina Margherita", exhibited at the Museo nazionale della scienza e della tecnologia Leonardo da Vinci of Milan.

Franco Tosi grew out of an engineering business called, originally, Cantoni Krumm & C., which Tosi himself joined as Technical Director in 1876. The firm had originated a couple of years earlier (1874) as a producer, primarily, of textile machinery, but under Tosi's leadership it rapidly reinvented itself as a producer of steam engines, which Tosi had developed for use as the power source for industrial looms. These formed the basis for the company's rapid growth in the closing decades of the nineteenth century. Tosi soon became a shareholder, and in 1881 the company also took his name. In 1894 he became the sole shareholder.

Some time later in 1907, the business diversified into the production of diesel engines, which was then a rapidly growing market sector. For a time Ettore Maserati, one of the five brothers who later founded Maserati, worked as a designer of diesel engines for "Franco Tosi", which was also cooperating with the motorbike producer, Emilio Bozzi.

In 1914, shortly before the start of the First World War, Tosi established as a subsidiary business a shipyard at Taranto in the south of the country for the production of submarines and ships, destined primarily for the Regia Marina and the Italian Navy. During the 1920s a submarine from this shipyard, the Cantieri navali Tosi di Taranto, achieved a world-wide depth record descending to 75 meters below sea level.

In 1919 the United Engineering Company of San Francisco obtained the rights to manufacture 4-, 6- and 8-cylinder variants of Franco Tosi four-cycle marine diesel engines.

In the 1930s the football team from the Tosi shipyard in Taranto participated in the first division of the Italian football league.

After the Second World War, "Franco Tosi" collaborated with two large US corporation called General Electric and Combustion Engineering producing under licence large steam turbines and boilers of American design. Turbine components were also produced. The 1970s saw the number of employees peaking at more than 6,000.

Franco Tosi in 1958 by Paolo Monti

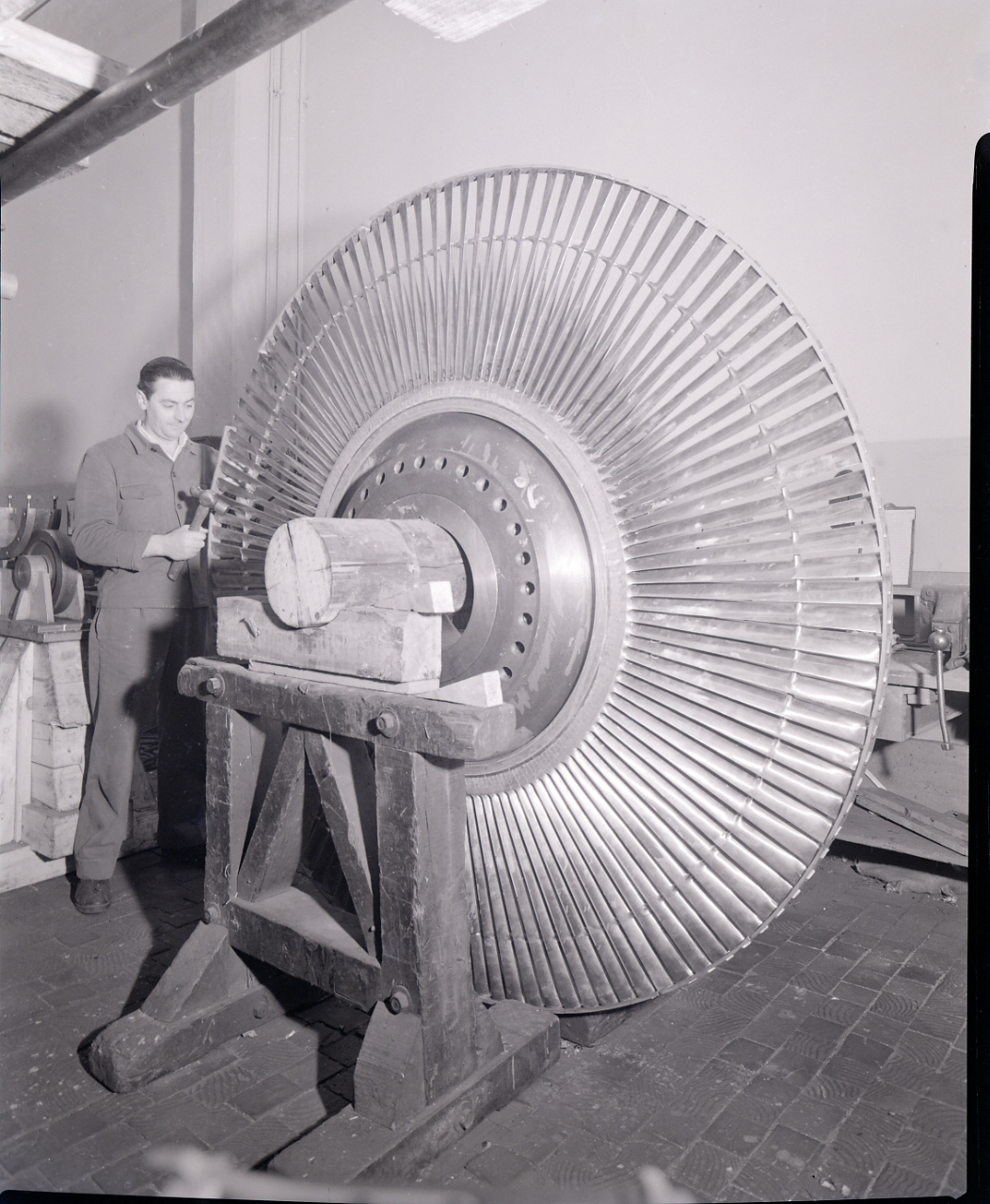

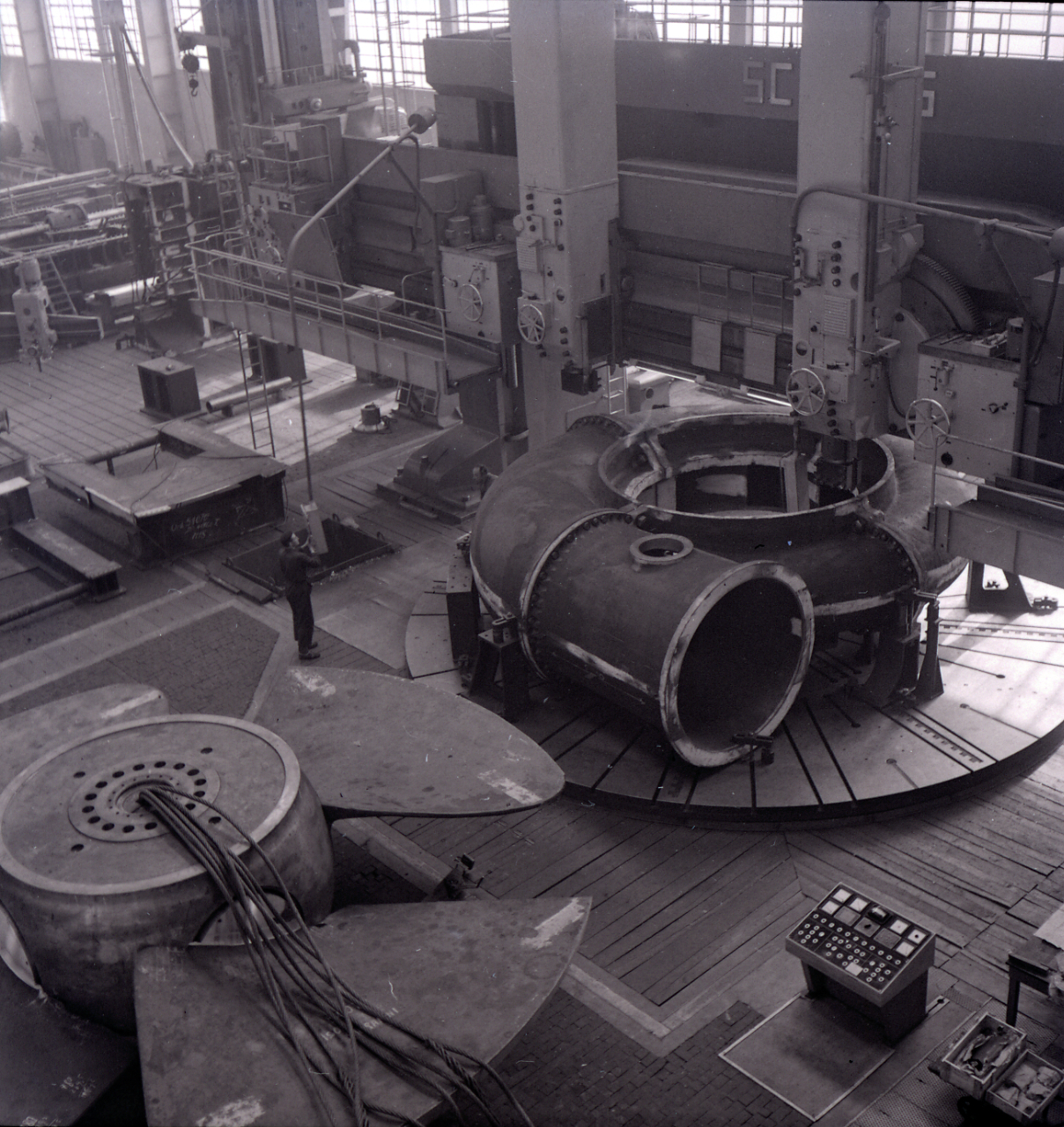

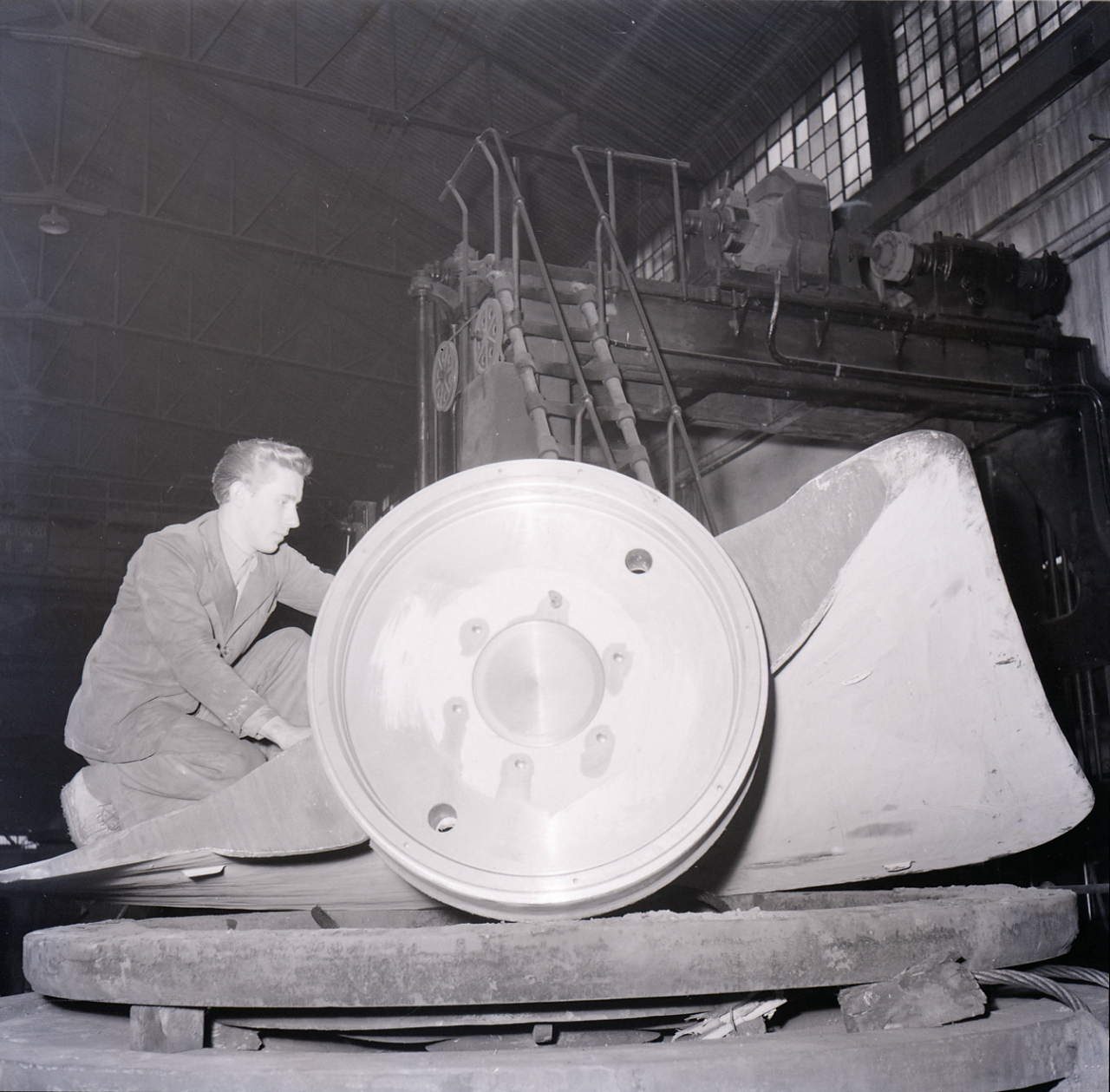

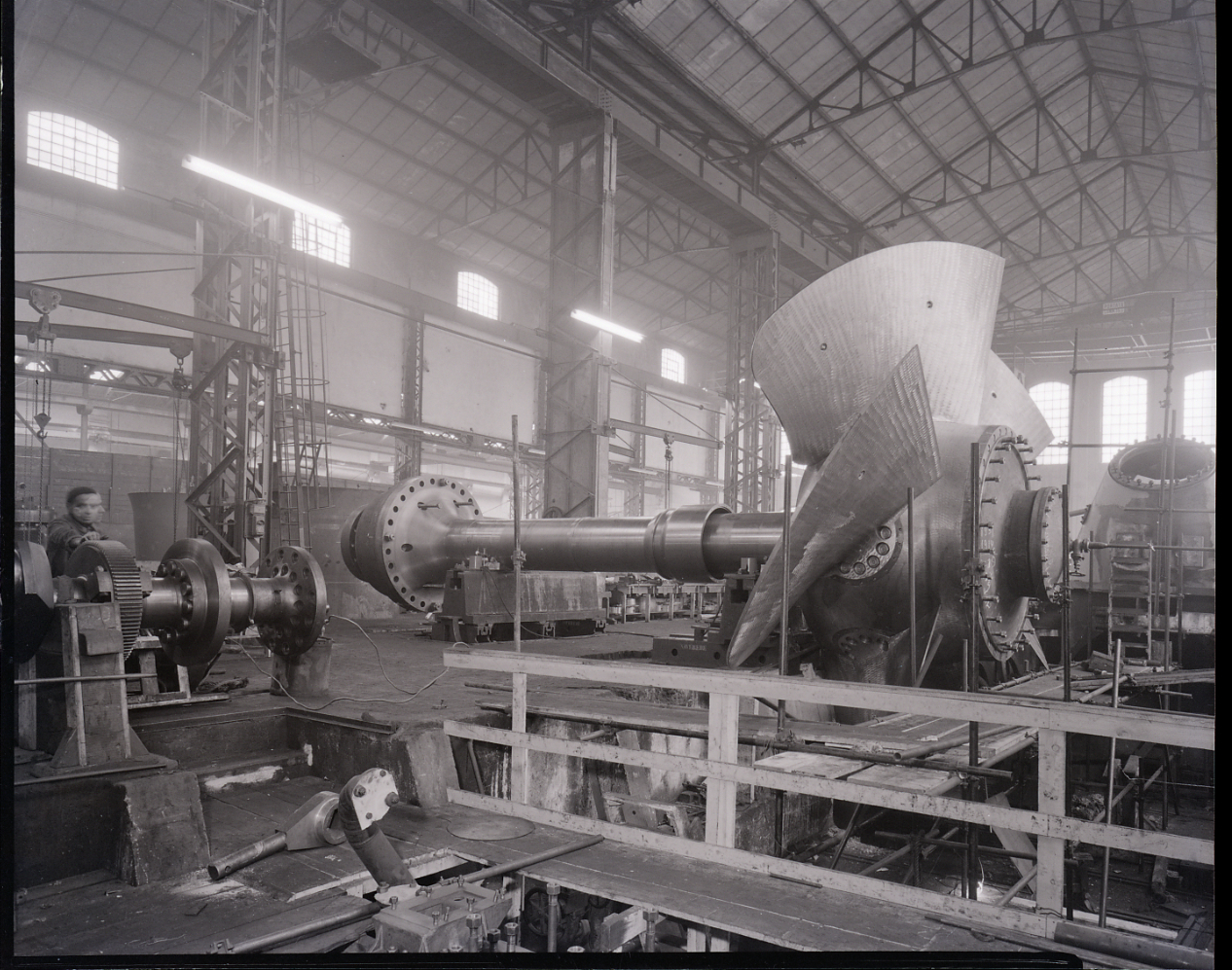

== As Franco Tosi Meccanica ==
The early 1990s was a time of world-wide crisis for producers of power generation equipment, and "Franco Tosi" found itself taken over by Ansaldo, the resulting combine being taken over in 1993 by Finmeccanica and integrated into that company's energy division under the name AnsaldoEnergia. However, this resulted in a concentration of control in the Italian energy sector which attracted the attention of the Competition Authority. In response to pressure from the regulator the integration of Finmeccanica was reversed, and ownership of "Franco Tosi" transferred, in 2000, to the Cast Group. At was at this point that the business acquired its current name, "Franco Tosi Meccanica S.p.A.".

On 25 July 2013 the bankruptcy court in Milan declared the company insolvent.

On 9 June 2015 Presezzi Group acquired the business of Franco Tosi Meccanica which includes among other:

- plant, machinery and equipment:
- the brand "Franco Tosi", all patents and other rights of industrial and intellectual property;
- the know-how and all technical documentation, including manufacturing and construction drawings
- all work in progress and order backlog.

== See also ==
- List of Italian companies
