= Alda Levi =

Italian archaeologist (1890–1950)

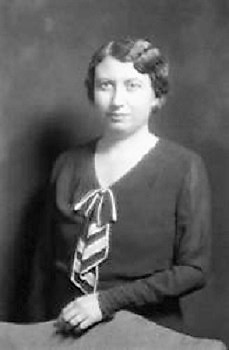
- 1930 photograph
- Born: 16 June 1890; Bologna, Kingdom of Italy
- Died: 23 June 1950 (aged 60); Rome, Italy
- Other name: Alda Levi Spinazzola
- Occupations: Archaeologist and art historian
- Spouse: Vittorio Spinazzola (m. 1932; died 1943)

Alda Levi Spinazzola (née Levi; 16 June 1890 – 23 June 1950) was an Italian archaeologist and art historian.

== Biography ==
Levi was born within a Jewish middle-class family and attended the liceo classico Tito Livio in Padua. In 1913 she graduated in Classical Philology and Learning sciences at Padua University. In 1915 she started her career as an inspector at the Soprintendenza Archeologica di Napoli, and soon after met her future husband and opponent of Fascism, Vittorio Spinazzola. The two were married only in 1932.

Levi moved to Bologna (1924) and then Milan (1925) and she was appointed as director of the Ufficio distaccato della Soprintendenza alle antichità of Turin first, and Padua thereafter. She was the only inspector of archaeology for the whole Lombardy region during the years of the building boom.

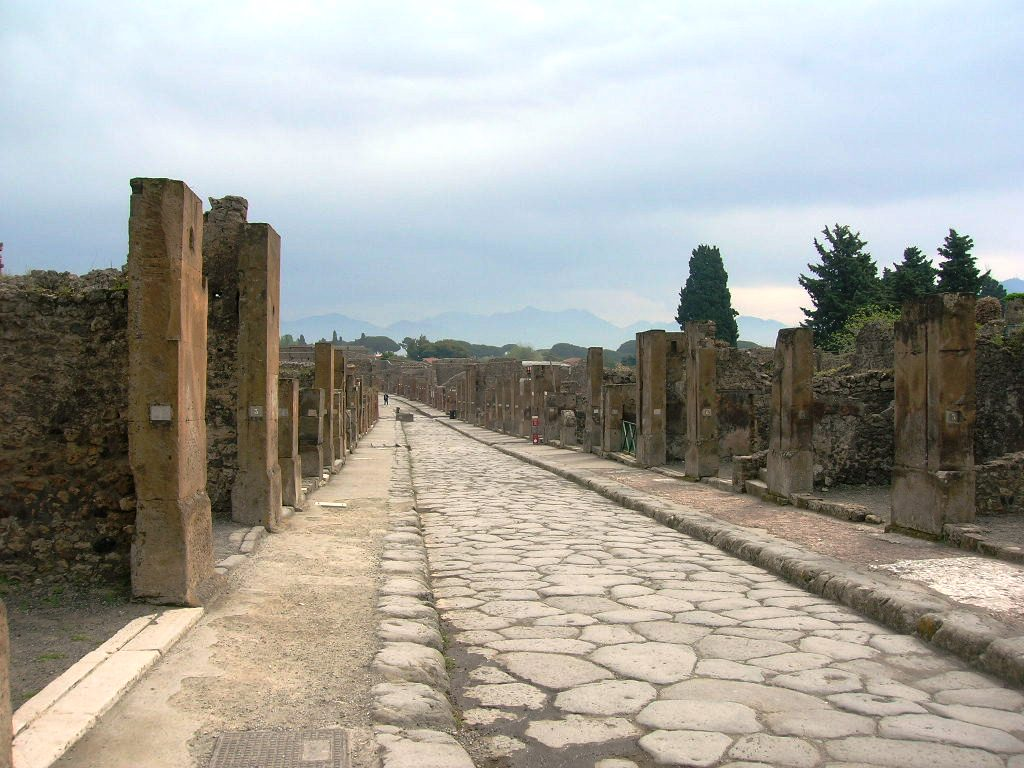
Via dell'Abbondanza, the main street in Pompeii

She published many of her excavations' results in a number of journals: Historia, Rivista Archeologica dell'Antica Provincia e diocesi di Como, Notizie degli Scavi di Antichità e Bullettino di Paleontologia Italiana. Furthermore, she published the Patera di Parabiago and a catalogue of the Greek and Roman sculptures of the Ducal palace, Mantua.

Following the publication of the Italian Racial Laws, Levi lost her job and moved to Rome, constantly in fear of deportation. After the end of the War (1945) she got her job back and she published, together with her husband, the results of the excavations in Via dell'Abbondanza in Pompeii. She converted to the Catholic religion and died in Rome in 1950.
