= Franco Tosi =

Italian engineer (1850–1898)

Franco Tosi (21 April 1850 – 25 November 1898) was an Italian engineer, known for his contributions to steam engine technology.

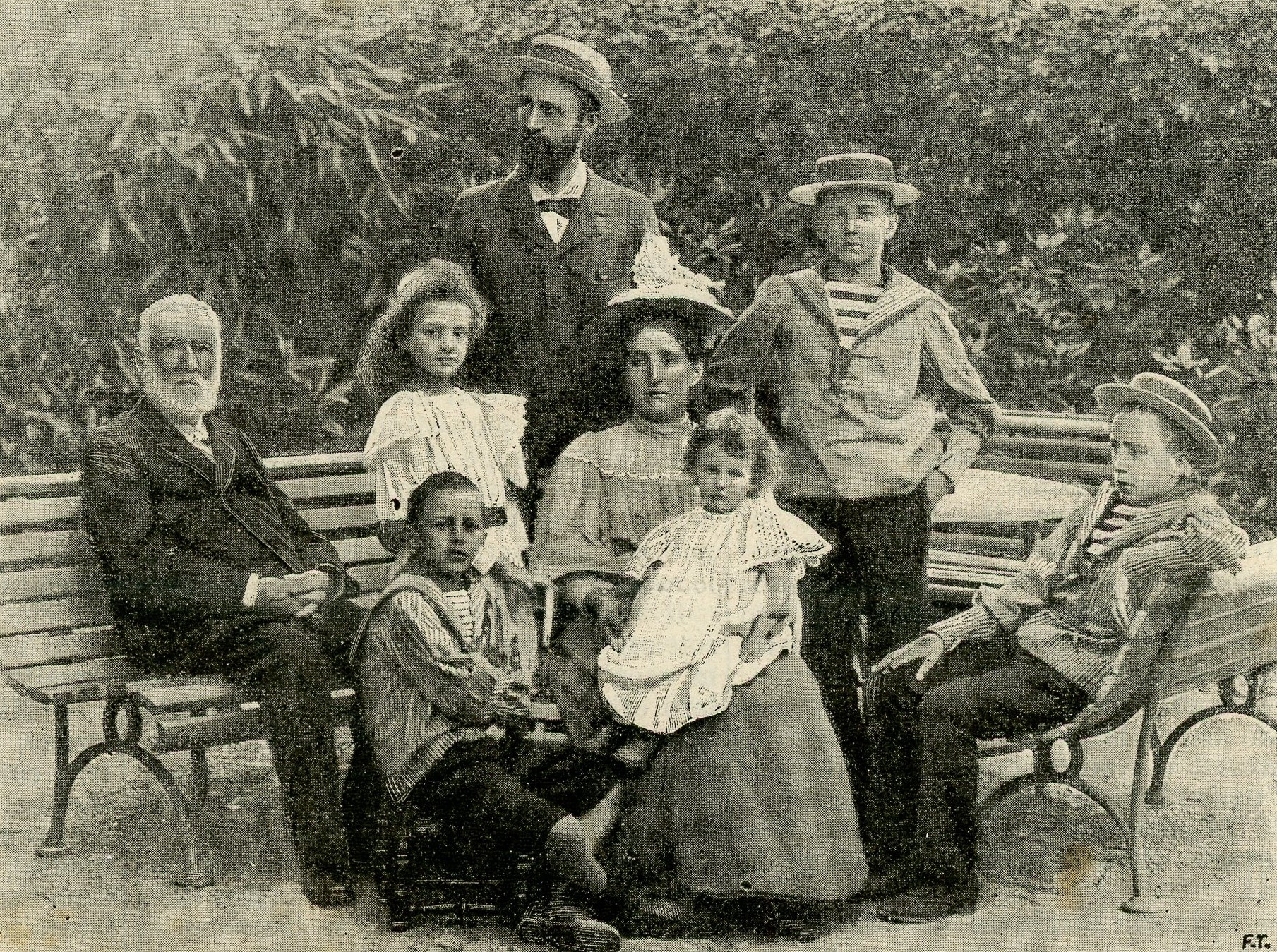
Franco Tosi (Tallest standing) and his family

A native of Villa Cortese, near Milan, he was the son of Eugenio Tosi (1815-1896), and moved to Legnano in 1876, to become the manager of Cantoni-Krumm & C., where he led the development of the famous 3 hp (1877) and 40–50 hp Ryder steam engines (1881), the year which the company changed name to its current, Franco Tosi Meccanica. It employed six hundred people in the mid-1890s.

Franco Tosi was killed by one of his employees in 1898. The company persisted. Other milestones were the first 6,000 kW engine (1904) and becoming the first Italian diesel engine maker (1907). Tosi also cooperated with Emilio Bozzi on his motorcycle development, and supervised building of the first submarine diving at 75 meters (1920). After his withdrawal, the company has entered other engine technologies, and has about 6000 employees.

Tosi died at Legnano in 1898.
