= Palio di Legnano =

Horse race that is held each year in Legnano, Italy

Coordinates: 45.59465°N 8.91816°E

- Also called: Il Palio
- Observed by: Legnano, Italy
- Type: Historical
- Significance: To commemorate the battle of Legnano (29 May 1176)
- Celebrations: Medieval pageant for the streets of Legnano; horse race between the eight contrade legnanesi at the Stadio Giovanni Mari
- Observances: Vigil of Aribert's cross; solemn Mass officiated on the Carroccio; religious investiture of the captains of the Contrade legnanesi; blessing of horses and jockeys taking part in the horse race
- Date: Last Sunday in May
- 2025 date: May 25
- 2026 date: May 31
- 2027 date: May 30
- 2028 date: May 28
- Frequency: Annual
- First time: 1935
- Related to: Regional feast of Lombardy; feast of saints Sisinnio, Martirio and Alessandro

The Palio di Legnano (Italian: [ˈpaːljo di leɲˈɲaːno]; known locally simply as Il Palio) is a traditional event generally held on the last Sunday of May in the city of Legnano, Italy, to recall the Battle of Legnano held on 29 May 1176 by the Lombard League and the Holy Roman Empire of Frederick Barbarossa. This Palio is composed by a medieval pageant and a horse race. Until 2005 the whole event was named Sagra del Carroccio.

Legnano is subdivided into eight contrade, each of which takes part both in the medieval pageant and in the horse race held at the stadio Giovanni Mari. This is considered one of the most important non-competitive events of this type in Italy. In 2003 the historic pageant was shown at the Columbus Day in New York City.

A lot of Palio-centric events take place in Legnano during May and July, such as the choral exhibition La Fabbrica del Canto '(The factory of singing)' born in 1992 from an idea of the musical association Jubilate. In 2015, institutions made 29 May a holiday for the whole of Lombardy.

== The premises ==
=== Oldest celebrations ===
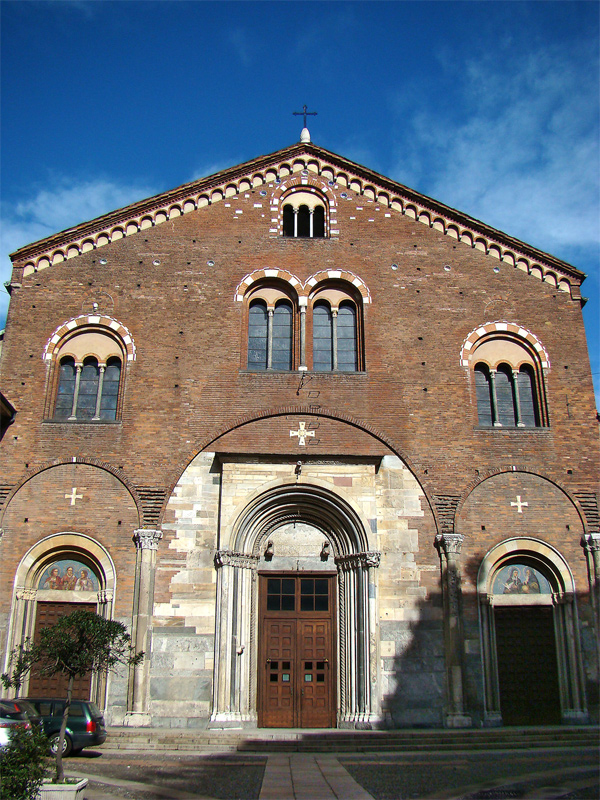
Basilica of San Simpliciano, Milan

The earliest documented commemorations of the battle of Legnano (29 May 1176) between Frederick Barbarossa and the Lombard League took place on 28 May 1393 in Milan in the basilica of San Simpliciano. In the document, which consists of a four-page decree issued by the podestà, the vicar and the Dodici di provvisione of the municipality of Milan, magistrates of the city were required to prepare a solemn procession to complete the civil ceremony which should have been concluded at basilica of San Simpliciano; at the time every civil celebration was in fact accompanied by a religious function. On this occasion it was decreed that on 29 May, the date of the battle of Legnano, it would be a day of civil and religious festivities throughout the Milanese countryside.

In 1499, with the occupation of the Duchy of Milan by the French Army, the festivity was first suppressed, then restored by St. Charles Borromeo in 1596, and finally suspended again from 1784. On 29 May he returned to being commemorated during the Italian unification as a symbol of the Italians' struggle against the foreign invader. The most important commemorations were those of 29 May 1848 in Milan during the revolutions of 1848, which took place solemnly in the basilica of Sant'Ambrogio in Milan, and those of 1876 in Milan and Legnano on the occasion of the 7th centenary of the battle. For the 7th centenary of the battle, more than 40,000 people from all over Italy and 197 banners representing all the provinces and municipalities of the Italian Peninsula came to Legnano.

Festivity in San Magno Square in Legnano in 1876, seven centuries after the battle (29 May 1876)

In Legnano, from the following years, on the wave of the celebrations of the 7th centenary, commemorations of the battle were occasionally organized by the population. The turning point came on 29 June 1900 with the inauguration of the Monument to the Warrior of Legnano by Enrico Butti, who replaced a previous statue made for the 7th centenary of the battle by Egidio Pozzi: from this date the official celebrations of the battle were transferred from Milan to Legnano, with the people of Legnano who began to remember the military battle on an annual basis. The monument was built at the behest of Giuseppe Garibaldi: on 16 June 1862, during a visit to Legnano at the invitation of the mayor of Legnano Andrea Bossi, Garibaldi gave a speech urging the people of Legnano to erect a monument in memory of the famous battle of 29 May 1176:

[...] We care little about the memories of patriotic events; Legnano lacks a monument to ascertain the value of our ancestors and the memory of our connected fathers, who managed to beat foreigners as soon as they understood each other. [...] (Note: [...] Noi abbiamo poca cura delle memorie degli avvenimenti patrii; Legnano manca di un monumento per constatare il valore dei nostri antenati e la memoria dei nostri padri collegati, i quali riuscirono a bastonare gli stranieri appena s'intesero. [...])

— Giuseppe Garibaldi

As for the religious celebration at the basilica of San Simpliciano in Milan, still in the 21st century, on the last Sunday of May, the battle of 29 May 1176 is remembered with a procession and a religious function which includes the vigil of a copy of the cross of Aribert: a delegation from the city of Legnano and its contrade also participates in this celebration.

=== The attempt of 1926 ===
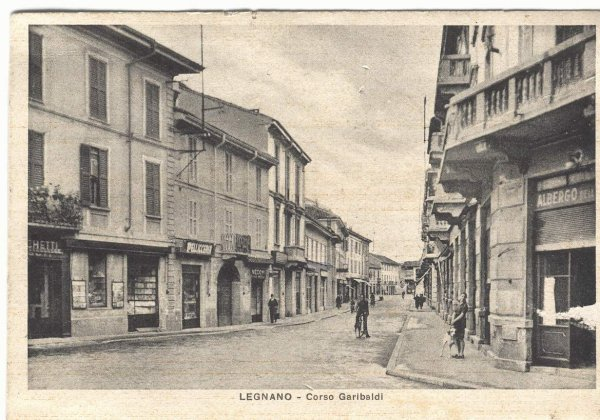
Legnano at the beginning of the 20th century

The first proposal to organize an event with the contribution of the municipal administration of Legnano was hypothesized in 1926 by Carlo De Giorgi, journalist and local exponent of the National Fascist Party. De Giorgi, founder of the local periodical Lo Specchio, tried to put this idea into practice to commemorate the 750th anniversary of the battle, which fell in 1926.

This idea was not followed because of the too high cost of organizing the event, which was estimated at 50,000 lire, an amount judged excessive even by Fabio Vignati, then podestà of Legnano and then head of the municipal administration, (Note: During the Fascist era the democratic organs of the municipalities were suppressed and all the functions previously carried out by mayor, by Municipal council were transferred to "podestà", a position of government nomination.) as well as a person attentive to the history of Legnano and often generous, even economically, towards cultural initiatives.

The estimated 50,000 pounds included 35,000 pounds to be used to pay the loan for 400 medieval clothes, and 15,000 pounds for horses destined for horse racing and for the oxen that should have pulled the copy of the Carroccio. This would have been a very conspicuous economic commitment: by comparison, to completely restore the bell tower of the basilica of San Magno, Legnano, again in 1926, 48,000 lire was spent.

=== The feast of the Carroccio of 1932 ===
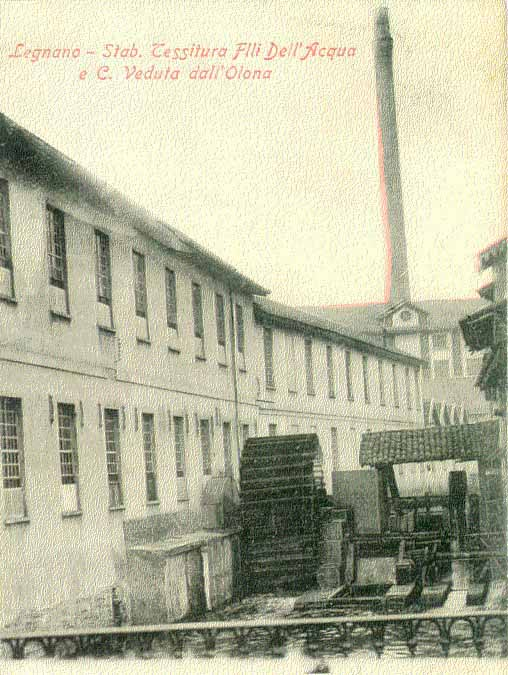
The Dell'Acqua plant in Legnano

The first event officially organized by the town authorities of Legnano, which took place in 1932, was still on the initiative of Carlo De Giorgi. This time the purpose of organizing a demonstration to commemorate the battle of Legnano followed because the political climate had changed in the meantime: fascism, for some time, had been busy stimulating the birth of events that celebrated national pride even with the giving of important funding. One of these events was the battle of Legnano, where the Italian troops of the Lombard League defeated the German armies of the Holy Roman Empire, ending the hegemonic dream of the German emperor Frederick Barbarossa on Northern Italy.

This event, which was called "Festa del Carroccio" and which this time had the full support of the municipal administration, included a gastronomic fair set up in the modern Via Diaz and Matteotti, a medieval pageant through the streets of Legnano and a horse race that came organized at the local sports field Brusadelli (built as a sports center for the dopolavoro of the Cotonificio Dell'Acqua, now it is named after Pino Cozzi, historical president of the Unione Sportiva Legnanese) and which did not end due to the death of a jockey, a teenager of only 15 years untrained to the races, who fell from his horse and was killed instantly. With the Festa del Carroccio, it then passed from austere and solemn civil celebrations to a folkloristic and sporting show, although not lucky, at least in its first edition, due to the misfortune mentioned.

As a result of the tragedy that struck the young jockey, in the years immediately following, the horse race was not repeated, without prejudice to the organization of the other events, which continued to take place even later. The ten contrade that were to participate in the first edition of the Palio di Legnano (1935) were established in 1932 on the occasion of the Festa del Carroccio: Ponzella, Olmina, San Bernardino, Legnarello, San Martino, Sant'Erasmo, Sant'Ambrogio, San Domenico, La Flora and San Magno, with the last eight still taking part in the modern event.

== History ==
=== The 1930s ===
==== The first edition ====
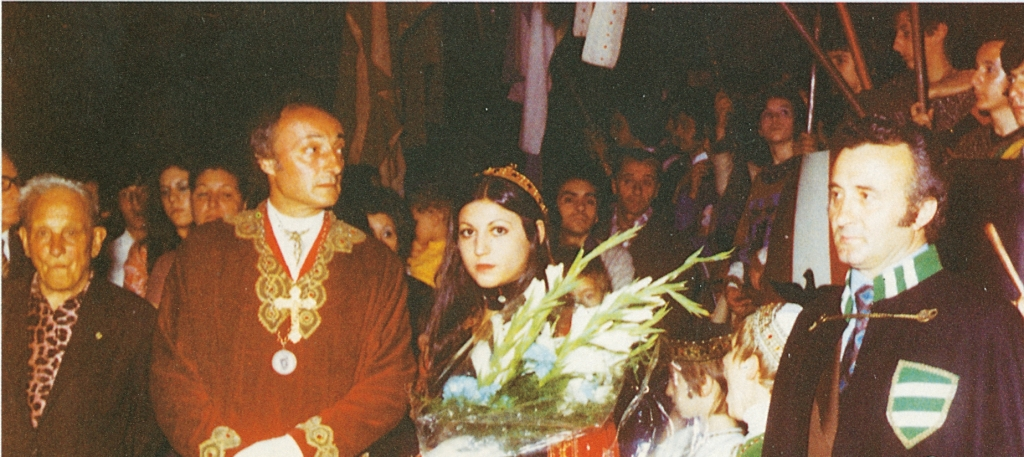
The regency of the Contrada San Domenico in the 1970s. The first on the left is Vittorio Ciapparelli, first winner of the Palio di Legnano (1935).

The Palio di Legnano, in its modern version, was organized for the first time on 26 May 1935 among the ten contrade mentioned above, later reduced to eight. The palio was born then during the fascist era, in a historical context in which the state authorities were committed to coercively promote all aspects related to Italian nationalism, recalling, where necessary, the events that marked the history of Italy in a victorious way. Referring to the first edition of the palio, the fascist hierarch Rino Parenti wrote:

[...] to the men of New Italy the value and the heroism of the ancient warriors. [...] (Note: [...] agli uomini della Nuova Italia il valore e l'eroismo degli antichi guerrieri. [...])

— Rino Parenti referring to the Palio di Legnano

In the first pre-war editions, the victory at the palio was not determined only by the horse race, but also by three other competitions: a foot race, a bicycle race and an automobile competition. The contrade were then assigned a score for each placement in the four specialties, whose sum proclaimed the winner of the palio. The first edition of the horse race, which was held in 1935, was won by the Contrada San Domenico, followed by Legnarello and La Flora. The debut of the Legnano palio was a success, both in the public and in the organization, so much so that tourists from other Italian cities also attended.

The name of the jockey who won the first edition of the horse race, Vittorio Ciapparelli, is however disputed by Franco Marini, formerly Grand Priory of the Contrada San Domenico and eyewitness of the 1935 horse race: Marini claims that the competition was actually won by a horse without jockey previously led by Pierino Ramolini, an event that was resumed and transmitted, according to the former Grand Prior of the Contrada San Domenico, by the newsreel Luce. However, Marini's thesis is contradicted by official sources that report, as the name of the victorious jockey, that of Ciapparelli. This contradictory information is due to the fact that in the first editions the horse race was not considered of primary importance compared to the other events of the event, so much so that its first roll of honor was only compiled in 1938: just on this first edition of the list of winners of the horse race the name of Vittorio Ciapparelli is reported.

==== The other editions of the decade ====
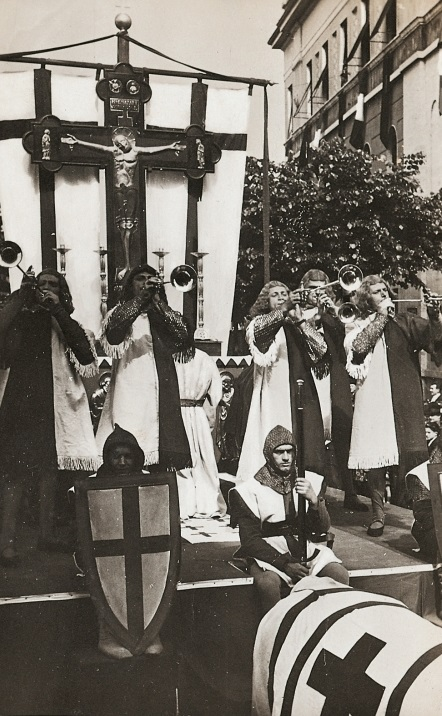
The Carroccio in the medieval pageant for the Palio di Legnano 1939

The first edition of the horse race was held at the sports field Brusadelli, while later the race was moved to the city stadium in Via Pisacane, where it is still organized. The transfer to the city stadium was not the only novelty of that year: from the canapo (the front rope) (Note: The palio regulation uses the term "canapo" instead of the more common "canape".) it was passed to the starting belts, and the bareback riding was replaced by the mount with the saddle. The canapo was then reintroduced in 1952 to then be replaced by ribbons in the following year, while from 1961 to 1963 the departure of the horses was decreed by the opening of cages. In 1963 the starting ribbons were reintroduced, which were replaced in 1974, this time definitively, by the canapo.

Already from the second edition (1936) the name of the event changed into "Sagra del Carroccio": this was due to a direct order by Benito Mussolini, which forced the organizers of the event to change the name of the event in such a way that the term "palio" was associated, exclusively, with the homonymous manifestation of Siena. On 5 June 1935, shortly after the end of the first edition of the event, Galeazzo Ciano, undersecretary of the Council of Ministers of the Kingdom of Italy with responsibility for the Press and Propaganda, sent a telegram to the prefect of Milan, immediately forwarded to the prefectural commissioner of Legnano, which reported the following order:

[...] For obvious reasons the Duce has established that the palio denomination is reserved for the traditional Sienese event and that the Legnano one is instead called "Sagra del Carroccio". [...] (Note: [...] Per ragioni evidenti il Duce ha stabilito che la denominazione palio sia riservata alla tradizionale manifestazione senese e che quella di Legnano sia invece chiamata "Sagra del Carroccio". [...])

— Galeazzo Ciano, 5 June 1935

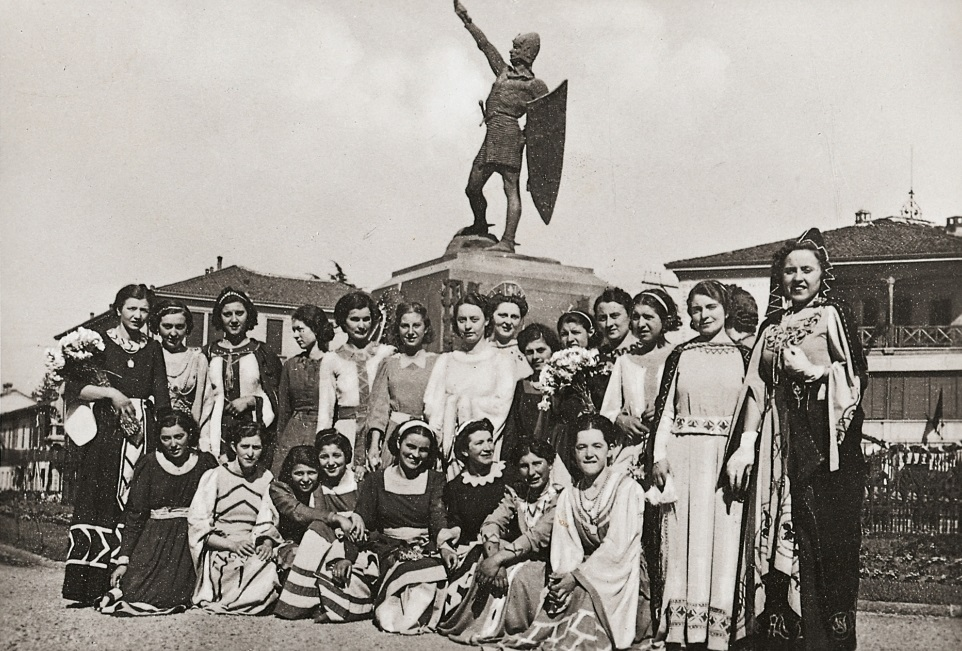
Chatelaines and dames posing in front of the monument to the Warrior of Legnano (1939)

For the 1936 edition the organizing committee made an effort to make the palio more evocative: the contrade were the main protagonists in the organization and the soldiers of the 3rd Regiment "Savoia Cavalleria" of Milan were involved in the medieval pageant, where they played the Company of Death. The second edition of the event was attended by other soldiers of the Italian Armed Forces stationed in Legnano as part of the historic procession. In 1936 the historic contrade were reduced to nine, with the suppression of the Contrada Ponzella, a number that fell to eight in 1937, with the suppression also of the Contrada Olmina. The popular and qualitative growth of the event continued to progress also in the following years, above all as regards the parade, which gradually became more and more suggestive.

In 1937 it was officially decided to cadence the Sagra del Carroccio every year: on this occasion the contrade endowed themselves with peculiar colors and a banner, while important personalities of the city life were put at the head of the historical contrade; it is from this edition that the competition between the contrade began to spread. Three official committees were then set up for the organization of the event: the actual organizing committee, pertaining to the after-work of municipal employees, which was dedicated to the general aspects, and two specific committees dealing respectively with the artistic-cultural aspects and those purely administrative.

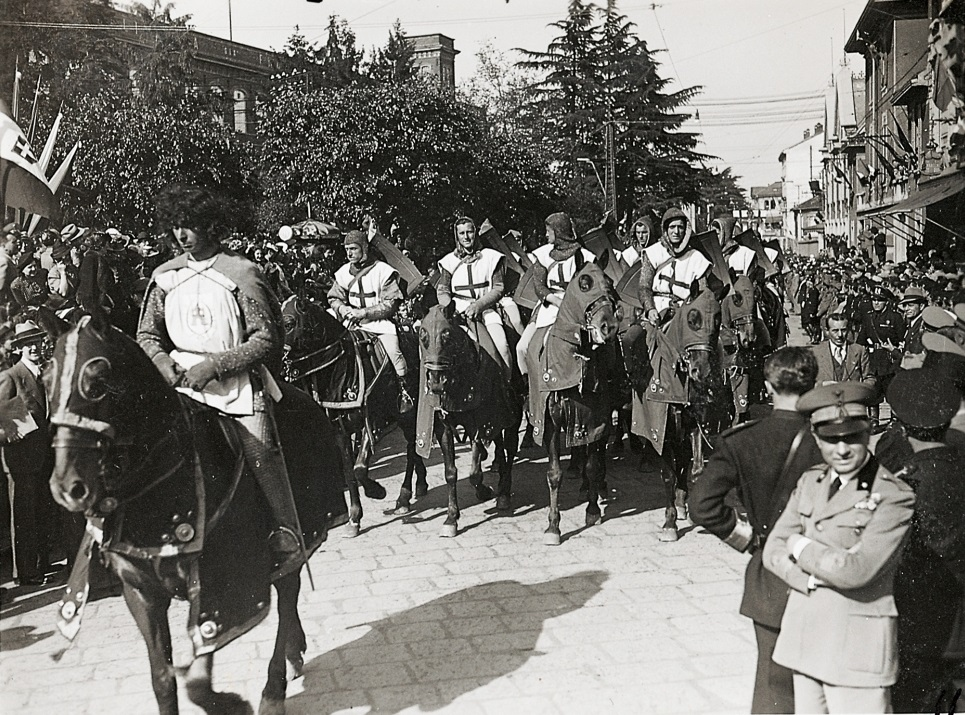
The Savoia Cavalleria regiment in the role of the Company of Death for the Palio di Legnano 1939

The Sagra del Carroccio was interrupted after the 1939 edition: the organizers did not want to irritate the German ally with a demonstration that called for an Italian military victory over German armies. This sentiment was also shared by the upper echelons, and therefore all the celebrations of the date of May 29 that were held on the national territory were suspended. The 1939 edition was attended by the princes of House of Savoy, some military and civilian personalities of Milan and the representatives of the municipalities that had once coalesced in the Lombard League. This edition was a great success, both among the citizens of Legnanese and among tourists, so much so that it is remembered as one of the most successful palios. Due to the suspension of the event, the copy of the cross by Aribert, coveted palio of the horse race, was kept in the church of Sant'Erasmo, a religious building of reference for the homonymous contrada that won in 1939, for more than ten years.

=== The 1950s ===
The Sagra del Carroccio was not resumed until May 1952 on the initiative of the Famiglia Legnanese (non-profit cultural association based in Legnano), the provost of the city and the municipality of Legnano, this time totally detached from the political significance imposed by the fascist regime before the war; the funds needed to hold the palio were made available by the municipal administration and a loan from the Banca di Legnano. Anacleto Tenconi, then mayor of Legnano, recalled those moments:

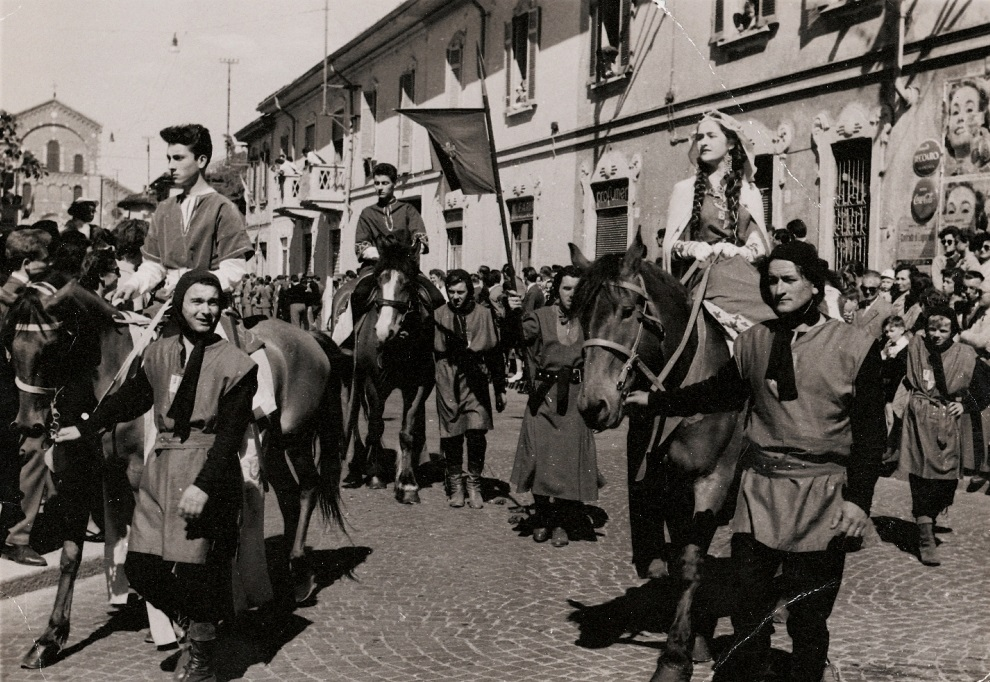
Medieval pageant for the Palio di Legnano 1955. In the fifties the medieval pageant started from the church of reference of the contrada that won the palio of the previous year. In this case the parade started from the church of the Santissimo Redentore, which can be seen in the background, of the Contrada Legnarello

In the context of new feelings and aspirations we returned to the search for ancient traditions, which re-created a historical identity, reigniting a dignity and a pride, which had fallen asleep during the disastrous war events. In truth, the memory of the Sagra del Carroccio, although set aside, had never been extinguished. [...] The initiative was somewhat reckless and difficult [...] several Legnanesi were reluctant to accept the resumption of the event, given its pre-war origin of the fascist period, having the fear that the restoration of the Sagra del Carroccio could cause political conflicts. But in the end the supporters of the recovery prevailed. (Note: [...] Nel contesto di sentimenti e aspirazioni nuovi si ritornò alla ricerca delle tradizioni antiche, che ricreasse un'identità storica, riaccendendo una dignità e un orgoglio, che si erano assopiti durante i disastrosi eventi bellici. Per la verità il ricordo della Sagra del Carroccio, seppure accantonato, non era mai stato spento. [...] L'iniziativa si presentava alquanto spericolata e difficile. Da notare il fatto che parecchi legnanesi erano riluttanti ad accettare la ripresa della manifestazione, data la sua origine prebellica del periodo fascista, avendo il timore che il ripristino della Sagra del Carroccio potesse provocare contrasti politici. Ma alla fine prevalsero i fautori della ripresa.)

— Anacleto Tenconi

As already mentioned, with the fall of the Fascist regime in Italy and the end of the second world war, the political connotations that had so characterized the prewar editions were eliminated from the event. The Sagra del Carroccio, in addition to the historical sense that recalls the famous battle, also acquired a meaning linked to that important and heartfelt moment of celebration of the city - with the contrade ideally gathered around the Carroccio - which is still valid today.

With the resumption of the organization of the event, the duration of the celebrations passed from one to two weeks and then evolved, over time, to a whole month, the so-called "Maggio Legnanese".

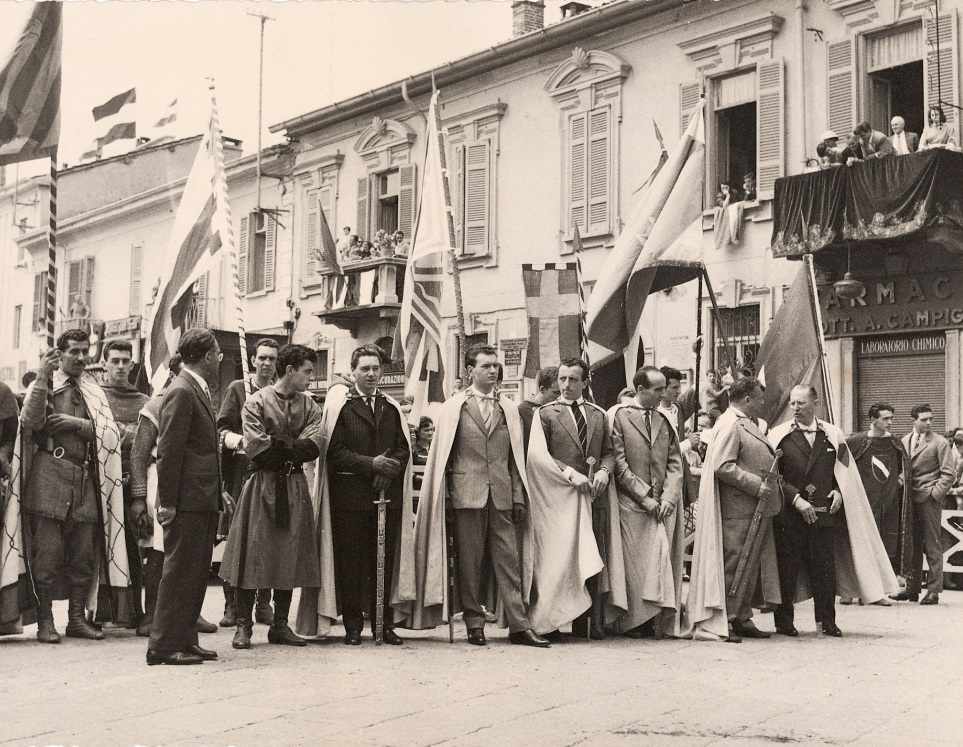
Religious investiture of the captains of the contrada in San Magno Square for the Palio di Legnano 1956

Since 1954 the Legnano palio has officially been counted among the Italian historical events; in the same year a representation of the protagonists of the Sagra del Carroccio, together with eleven other delegations of historic Italian events, was invited to the Colombian celebrations which were organized in Genoa from 3 to 15 October.

In the following year the "College of captains and contrade" was established, whose function is still to coordinate the activities, actions and intentions of the samei. Thanks to the work of the college, the contrade played an increasingly important role in the palio. Since 1955 the organizing committee of the Palio di Legnano has been formed by this college, the municipality of Legnano and the Famiglia Legnanese.

The 1955 horse race was suspended and not attributed to a disputed start due to an error by one of the judges of the competition, while that of the following year was poisoned by controversy due to another error by the judges who - without the photo finish - they qualified for the final San Martino instead of Sant'Erasmo.

In 1959 a monumental fountain was carved in front of the church of Santissimo Redentore in the Contrada Legnarello, on which the coats of arms of the contrade and the most important symbols of the palio were carved. The same year, on 19 May 1959, Pope John XXIII granted a private audience in the throne room to the mayor of Legnano as the supreme magistrate of the palio, to the captains of the contrade and to a representative of the Famiglia Legnanese.

The editions of the 1950s of the Sagra del Carroccio were also successful in the media: in 1952 the Legnese demonstration had the honor of appearing on the covers of La Domenica del Corriere and Grazia magazine while, in the same year, the satirical magazine Candido placed part of a comic story by Giovannino Guareschi at the Sagra del Carroccio which had among its protagonists Stalin, Palmiro Togliatti, Pietro Nenni and Nilde Iotti. In this decade a greater involvement of the civil society in the Legnano area and of the municipalities that had once coalesced in the Lombard League was also decided.

The financing of these editions, as well as from the municipality of Legnano, which used the proceeds obtained from tickets sold to attend the horse race, came from the province of Milan and from private subjects such as Cariplo, Banco Lariano and Banca di Legnano: the latter, in the 1990s, it became one of the sponsors of the palio.

=== The 1960s ===
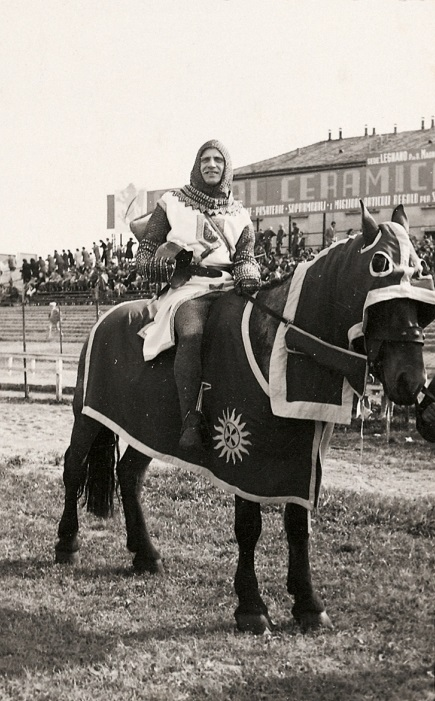
Medieval pageant for a 1960s edition of the Palio di Legnano

In 1960 a curious thing happened: a "strike" by some jockeys, who did not reach the economic agreement with their contrade to participate in the palio, despite the pressing negotiations that lasted almost until the horse race, caused the defection, to the last moment, of four of them. Each jockey was therefore obliged to run for two contrade.

In 1961 the captains of the contrade of Legnano had an official meeting with the archbishop of Milan Giovanni Battista Montini, future Pope Paul VI. The horse race of 1961 was the only one in which a female jockey participated, Cucca Felli, a young horsewoman from Casorate Sempione, who ran for the Contrada San Magno fighting for the victory until the middle of the race. Also in 1961, a copy of the Carroccio used in the Legnese demonstration took part in the historical procession organized in Turin on the occasion of the 100th anniversary of the unification of Italy.

In 1962 a fundamental event took place for the palio: in that year the medieval pageant was completely reorganized, with the quality of the costumes which grew considerably. Moreover, the costumes, and their realization, became specific of the Sagra del Carroccio; until 1962 many of them were borrowed from subjects external to the Legnese demonstration: most of the clothes came from the La Scala theater in Milan, where they were mostly used in the opera La battaglia di Legnano by Giuseppe Verdi.

In 1969 the armory room was added to the headquarters of the Contrada San Bernardino. On this occasion the furniture was also changed, which from a Spartan became valuable, with furniture that recalled the medieval style. This seat of the Contrada San Bernardino was the first "manor", (Note: The "manors" are the headquarters of the contrade of Legnano) in the modern sense of the term, of a contrada of Legnano. Such were the importance and the peculiarity, that his photos were printed for years on the brochures and leaflets.

=== The 1970s ===
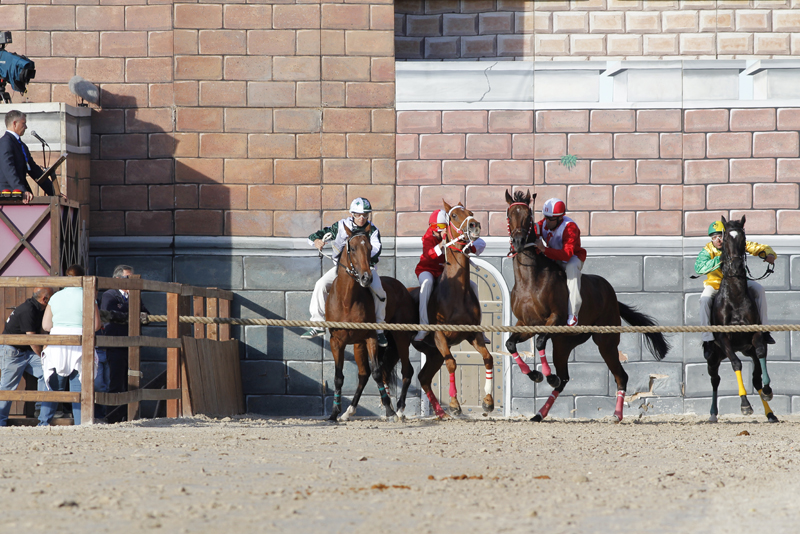
The horses stopped at the canapo (the front rope) before the mossa, or the start, at the Palio di Legnano 2013

In 1970 a striking fact occurred which caused quite a stir. Giuseppe Gentili, known as Ciancone, jockey of the Contrada La Flora, was convinced by two contrada members of San Bernardino to go to Parma to a restaurant to have a lunch before the race. After the meal, the three returned to Legnano late for the horse race. The jockey of La Flora could not therefore participate in the race, and invented a mysterious abduction carried out by the contradaioli of San Bernardino. The police then discovered the deception and arrested the jockey for a false complaint.

From 1971, in the horse race, the saddle was abolished with the return to the obligation, on the part of the jockeys, of the bareback riding, a type of mount that had characterized the first editions of the palio. This return to the past led to the participation of the famous jockeys who already ran the Palio di Siena and the Palio di Asti at the horse race at the Sagra del Carroccio. Among them we must certainly mention Andrea Degortes (called Aceto), Leonardo Viti (called Canapino), Salvatore Ladu (called Cianchino), Mario Cottone (known as Truciolo) and Antonello Casula (called Moretto). In 1974 the canapo (the front rope) was reintroduced for the start of the horse race.

In 1972 an unknown hand set fire to the manor of the Contrada San Domenico, which destroyed the headquarters of the contrada and all that was inside it, such as the weapons and clothes of the medieval pageant. Of all the preserved material only a velvet masculine garment escaped from the fire, which is still exhibited at the museum of the contrada.

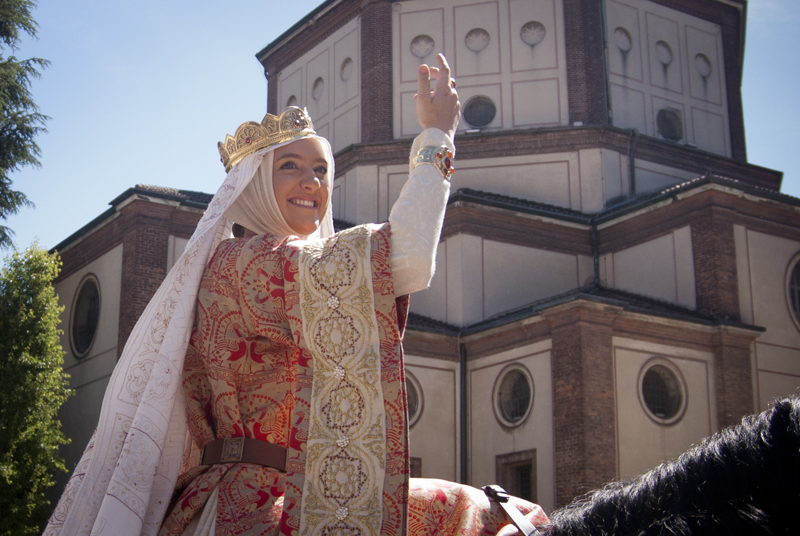
A moment of the medieval pageant of the Palio di Legnano 2013. In the background, the Basilica of San Magno

The 1976 edition of the palio was special: the 8th centenary of the battle of Legnano was celebrated. On this occasion, specific cultural, sporting, artistic and historical events were organized as a corollary to the main event. The captains of the contrade of Legnano were the protagonists, on 2 and 3 April, of a ride reminiscent in period costume whose path wound between Legnano and Pontida, site of the legendary Oath of Pontida that saw, according to tradition, the birth of the Lombard League: the itinerary, 70 km long, was divided into two stages, with an intermediate overnight stay on the night of 2 April inside the Royal Villa of Monza. In the same year a second cavalcade of the captain was prepared, this time destined for the Morimondo Abbey. The Carroccio used in the Palio di Legnano and the copy of the cross by Aribert were brought, on May 14, with a solemn ceremony, to the Basilica of San Simpliciano in Milan. In the following years the captains repeatedly recalled the stages of the battle of Legnano going back along the descent of Frederick Barbarossa in the Olona valley, a descent that was the premise for the famous armed clash of 29 May 1176.

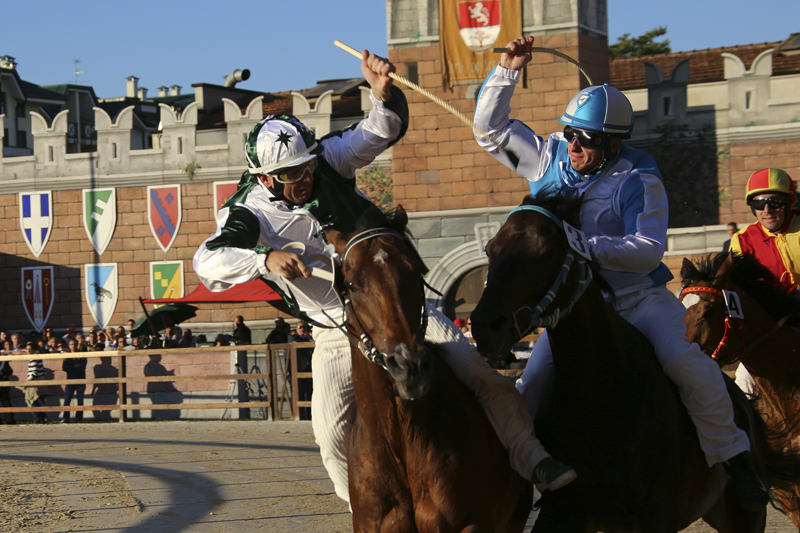
Horse race of the Palio di Legnano 2013

In 1976 it was also organized, at the Arena Civica in Milan, an extraordinary palio, which was won by San Magno; this event was heralded by a historic parade through the streets of the Lombard capital, from the Sforza Castle to the Arena Civica, which consisted of 600 participants. Saturday, May 29, the 8th centenary was solemnly celebrated in Legnano with a procession that left from Palazzo Malinverni, the city hall, and arrived at the monument to the Warrior of Legnano. The celebration ended then at the Galleria di Legnano. The 1976 Sagra del Carroccio was particularly solemn and was accompanied by an important public setting: along the streets of Legnano in fact 50,000 people congregated. The President of the Italian Republic Giovanni Leone was unable to be in Legnano to attend the event due to some commitments. However, the head of state sent a message:

[...] The memory of this great historic event is an opportunity to renew not only the memory of the struggles for the independence of the free medieval municipalities, but also to reaffirm the civil and democratic commitment of our republican institutions. [...] (Note: [...] Il ricordo di questo grande evento storico sia occasione per rinnovare non soltanto la memoria delle lotte per l'indipendenza dei liberi Comuni medioevali, ma anche per riaffermare l'impegno civile e democratico delle nostre istituzioni repubblicane. [...])

— Giovanni Leone, President of the Italian Republic

The horse race of 1977, won by the Contrada Sant'Erasmo, was not assigned due to some heated arguments that occurred at the end of the race between the jockeys of the contrade of San Bernardino, La Flora and San Magno. The Contrada Sant'Erasmo, which could have struck four consecutive victories, in protest, did not participate in the next edition of the palio.

=== The 1980s ===
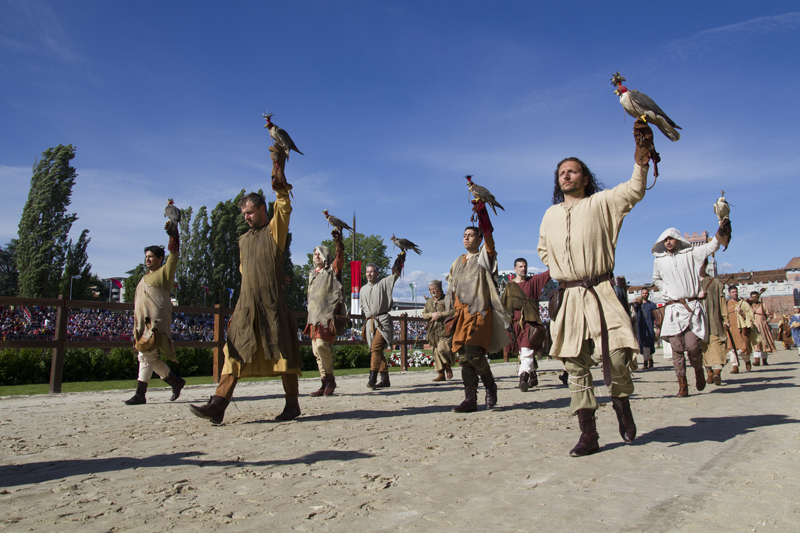
Medieval pageant for the Palio di Legnano 2013

In 1980 a second extraordinary palio was organized, this time to celebrate the 25th anniversary of the foundation of the "college of the captains and the contrade", which was then won by San Martino. Also on this occasion, to commemorate this anniversary, many special events were organized that were preparatory to the actual palio. Moreover, the contrade became comparable to real associations, being endowed with a statute that still describes their prerogatives in detail; this change was necessary because with the passing of the decades the activities of the historical contrade had widened more and more: the life of the contrade therefore had to be regulated with greater precision. The strengthening of the pride of belonging to one's own historical contrada and the intensification of rivalry between the contrade is also of these years. The latter, starting from this decade, began to purchase the manors that housed them at their own expense and began to set up the museums of the contrada. In addition, the process of improving the quality of the costumes of the medieval pageant continued, which became increasingly sought after and of a higher quality.

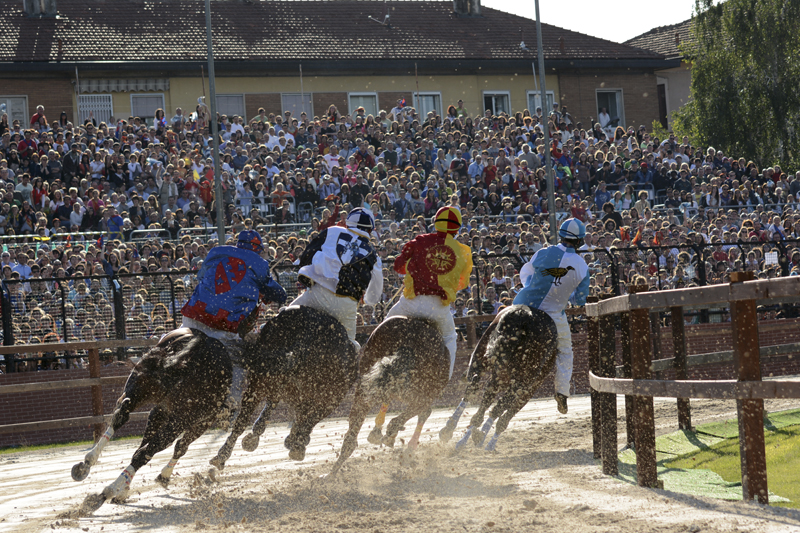
The horse race of Palio di Legnano 2013

The 1981 final was run twice due to the arrival in perfect equality of San Domenico and San Bernardino, so much so that it was not possible to establish the winner even at the photo finish. A further final was then reduced to these two contrade and disputed over a course of three laps of the field, where San Domenico won

In 1983 a representative delegation of the palio was invited to Konstanz, Germany, for the commemoration of the 8th centenary of the homonymous peace treaty, epilogue of the struggle between Frederick Barbarossa and the Lombard League, while the 1984 edition of the horse race was the only one to be postponed due to adverse weather conditions; the horse race was then run the following Sunday. The medieval pageant, on the other hand, did not take place. Also in 1984 a representative of the Legnanese event was invited by the Sicilian Region to the "Festival of the almond tree in bloom" of Agrigento.

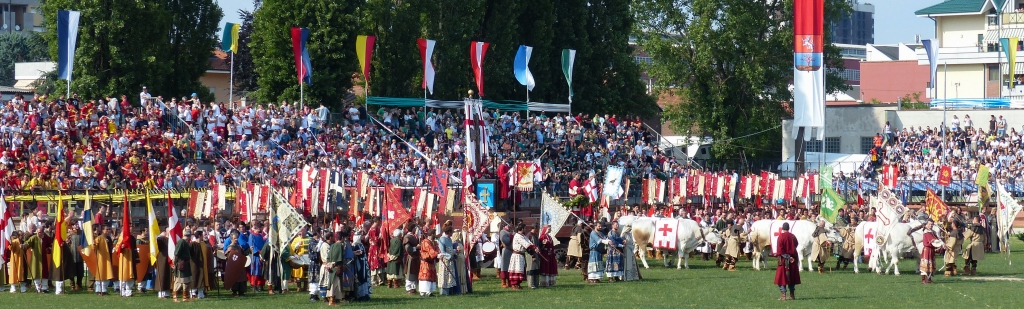
Arrival at the stadio Giovanni Mari of the historic parade of Palio di Legnano 2014

In 1985 the Carroccio used in the palio was completely rebuilt according to criteria more similar to those of the original medieval cart which was used in the battle of Legnano thanks to the consultation of sources of the time, who managed to provide detailed information on its characteristics; both the materials and the construction techniques used to make the new copy of the Carroccio traced those dating back to the Middle Ages. Craftsmen and specialized companies were involved in the construction of the new symbolic cart. The new Carroccio were then applied eight panels bearing the coats of arms of the contrade of Legnano. This new wagon, which has dimensions 2.60 x 5.40 x 6 m, is fully functional and plays a unique, symbolic and historical role.

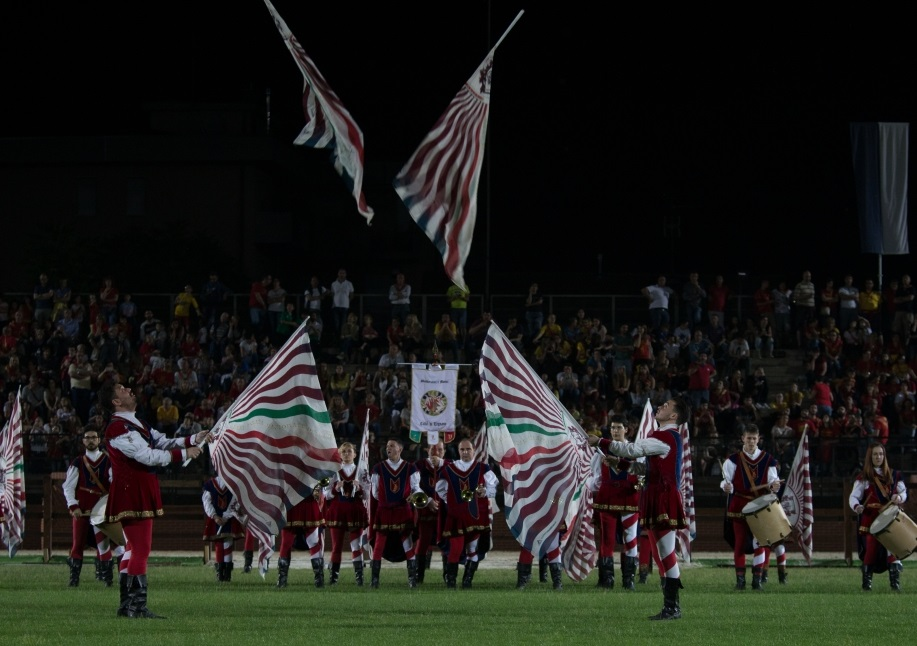
Flag-wavers of the Palio di Legnano during the exhibition held for the 2016 edition

Since 1986 the role of the municipal administration in the organization of the Palio di Legnano in importance: in fact, that year the institution of the Cavaliere del Carroccio ("Carroccio knight"), which is appointed by the supreme magistrate, or by the mayor of Legnano on the proposal of the college of captains and of the Famiglia Legnanese, and which still characterizes the Palio di Legnano. In other words, the command of organizing the palio passed to the municipality of Legnano, which began to exercise it through a steering committee. In addition, the budget and the final balance of the event, as well as the detailed program of the event, starting from that date, began to be previously approved by the Municipal council: the economic accounts, in particular, were included in the budget of the municipality of Legnano.

This change was necessary to link to the Sagra del Carroccio a juridical person to whom to associate the administrative, financial and penal responsibilities of the event. Being the protagonist of the municipality, the civil society of the city of Legnano was increasingly involved in organizing the event: from associations to Italian Armed Forces stationed in Legnano, from parishes to companies, from traders to craftsmen.

Until 1987 the performance of the flag wavers was also part of the Legnanese event: they were eliminated from the program because they were not historically contextualised. The flag-wavers, in fact, appeared a few centuries after the battle of Legnano. However, having entered the collective mind of the people of Legnano in 2016, their reintroduction into the official program of the Legnano race was decided.

A unique event in the history of the Palio di Legnano that concerns a jockey and that happened in 1987 caused a sensation: the disqualification for life of the jockey Mario Cottone, known as Truciolo, due to his participation, together with some contradaioli of San Martino, in an expedition punitive in the manor of Legnarello occurred on the evening of the eve of the palio.

=== From the 1990s to the 21st century ===
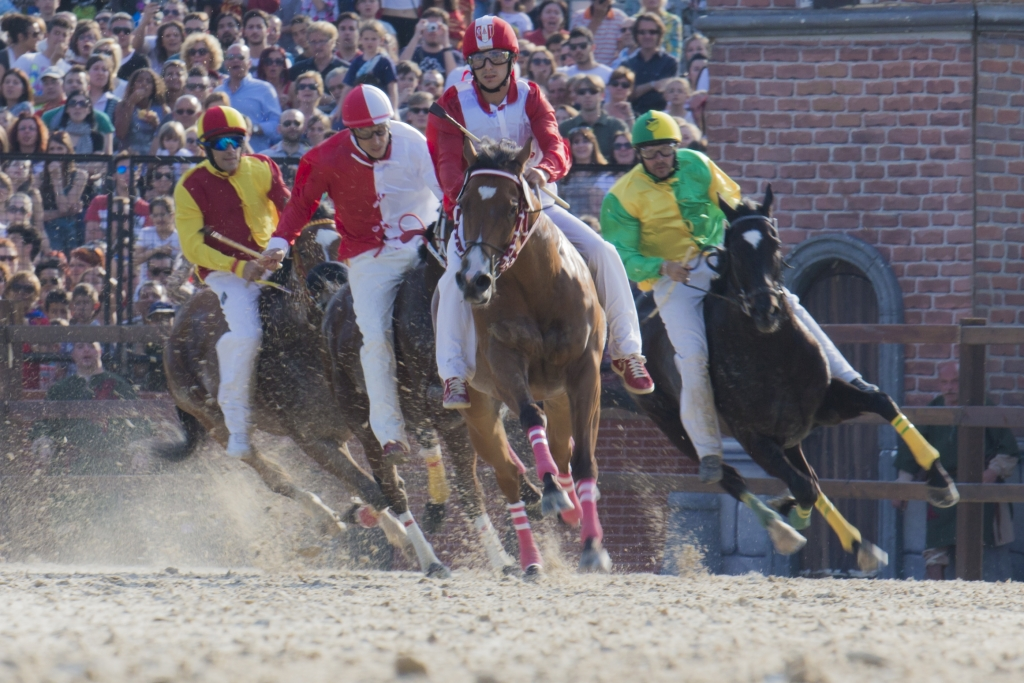
The horse race of the Palio di Legnano 2014

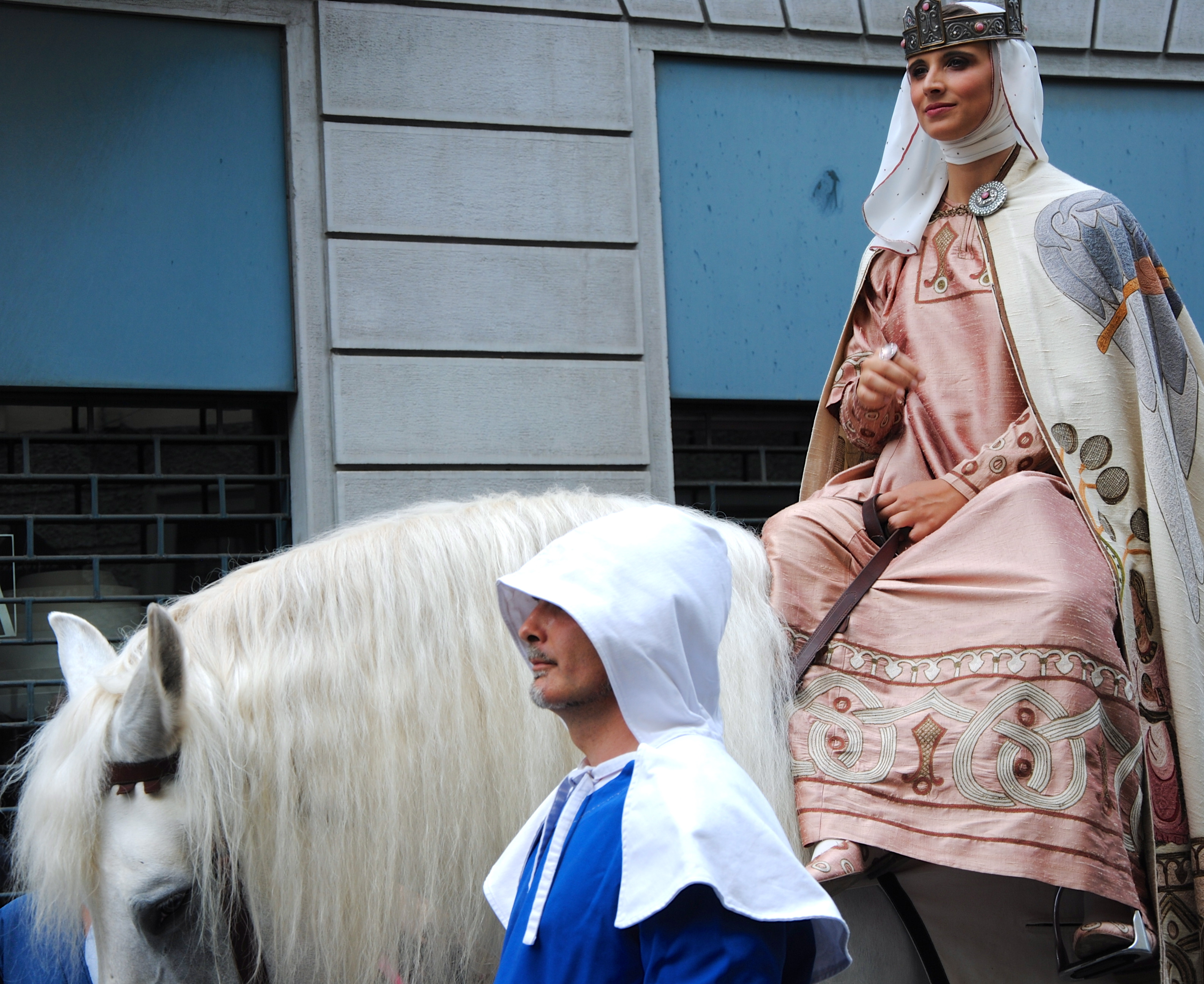
Medieval pageant of the Palio di Legnano 2015

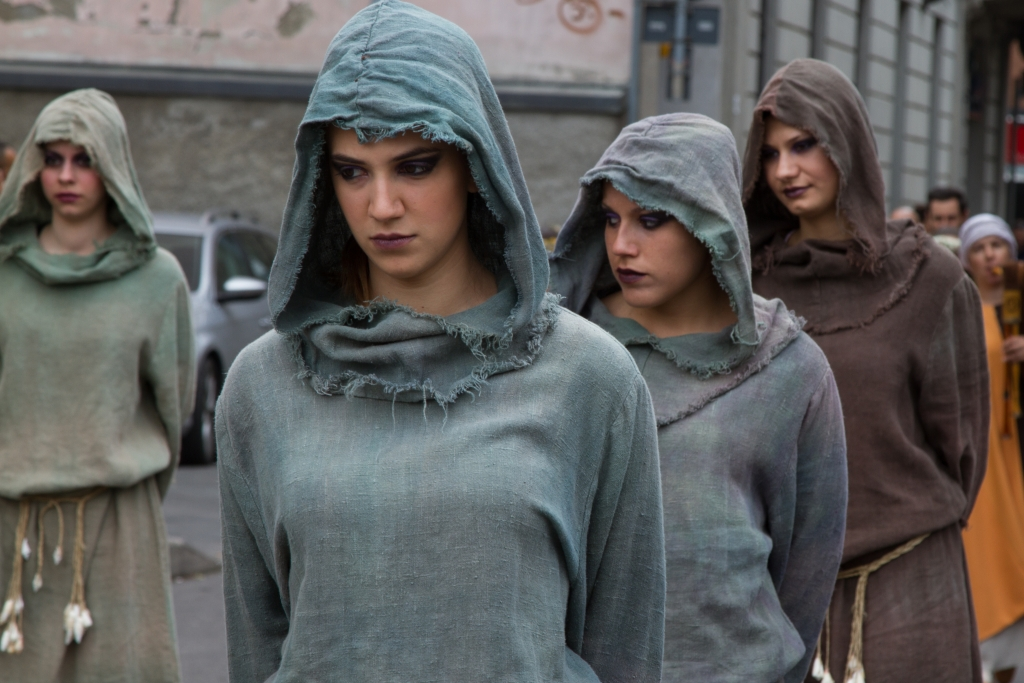
Medieval pageant of the Palio di Legnano 2015

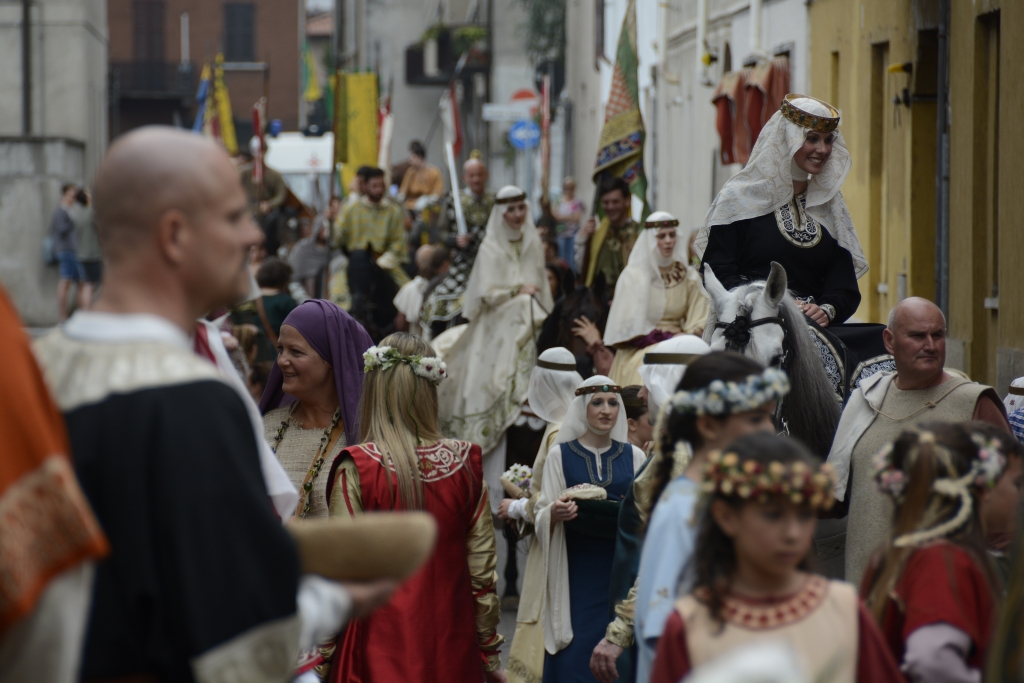
Medieval pageant of the Palio di Legnano 2015

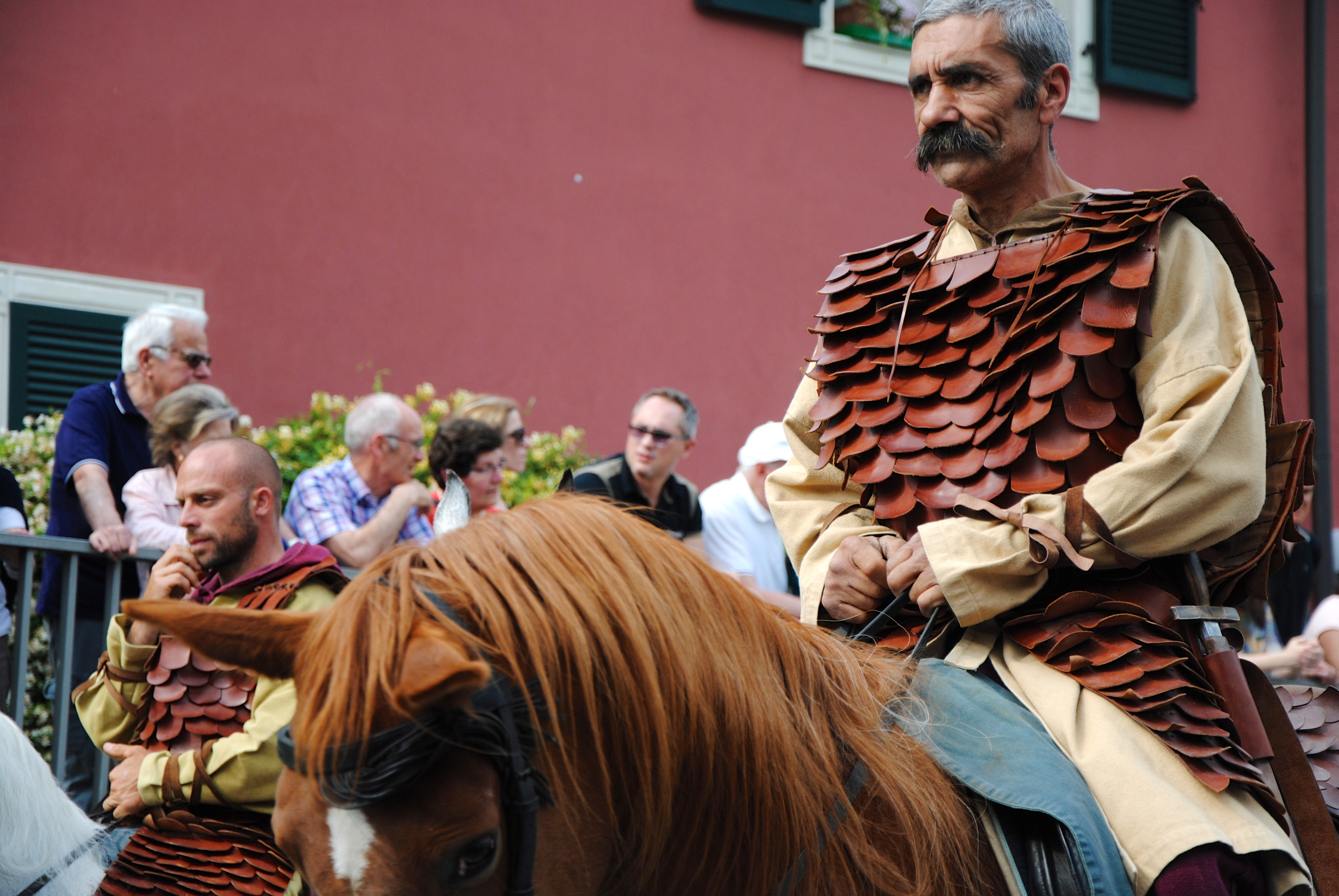
Medieval pageant of the Palio di Legnano 2015

It was the 1990s who discovered the greatest development of the Sagra del Carroccio. In this decade the so-called "Maggio Legnanese" was overcome, that is the series of events linked to the palio that were organized only during this month of the year: starting from this decade, the events began to be prepared also in other periods of the year, enriching the program of the event with many other types of events, so as to give the Sagra del Carroccio a much wider breath.

In 1990 the "Permanent commission of costumes" was founded, which deals with the conformity of the material used in the medieval pageant with respect to the invoice of the weapons, the clothes and the hairstyles used in the 12th century; this committee was officially included in the palio regulation in 1995. In its first years of activity the permanent commission of the costumes did a job of improvement of the clothes wearing by the figurants of the contrade, to then pass to a role of supervision and consultancy.

In 1991 a delegation from the Sagra del Carroccio formed by about a hundred representatives was invited to the Fête de la Renaissance in Lyon, France, during which they paraded in costume through the city streets of the transalpine city, reproducing the historical procession of the Palio di Legnano. The following year a delegation from the city of Lyon and its contrade, called les Pennones de Lion, attended the Sagra del Carroccio.

Since 1992, at the behest of the college of captains and the contrade, a veterinary commission has been active which closely follows the development of the horse race and deals with the medical fitness of horses; in the event of an accident of the latter, a local veterinary clinic intervenes and immediately takes care of injured animals. Furthermore, this commission has been provided with ample decision-making powers, so much so that it can decree the immediate exclusion from the tender of a horse considered unsuitable. From 1992 it also finds space, among the events linked to the Palio, La Fabbrica del Canto, an international choral music event born in 1992 from an idea of the musical association Jubilate. From 1993, within the Sagra del Carroccio, exhibitions and conferences on the Middle Ages began to be prepared.

Given the recognized quality of the material used during the historic parade, in 1995 an exhibition was organized within the Museo Nazionale Scienza e Tecnologia Leonardo da Vinci, concerning the display of the clothes, ornaments and weapons of the medieval pageant of the Palio di Legnano. In 1996 the theme parade was introduced: each contrada participates in the historical procession showing a particular aspect of the Middle Ages (war, work, music, etc.). In 1997, a theater workshop was added to the events linked to the palio. In May 1998 a cavalcade in medieval costume was organized of the captains of the contrade, whose route ran from Legnano to the monastery of Cairate, a place where Barbarossa stayed the night before the battle.

In 2002, the historic Palio parade in Legnano was also revived at Columbus Day in New York City. In the same year, the House of Savoy, or the ruling dynasty in Italy from 1861 to 1946, officially granted the title of "sovereign" to the Contrada La Flora. For the 50th anniversary of the establishment of the college of captains and contrade, in 2005, another extraordinary palio was played, the so-called "palio d'Onore".

In 2006 the event returned to its official name "Palio di Legnano". The 2006 edition was instead suspended and not attributed due to an invasion of the Contrada San Domenico; the "college of magistrates of the palio", in addition to not assigning the 2006 edition, made a fine of 10,000 euros in the Contrada San Domenico, disqualifying it for the 2007 edition.

The 2009 edition of the horse race was instead the first to be disputed on the sand. In 2015 the palio was decided by the photo finish between heated controversy: Sant'Ambrogio and Legnarello arrived almost in a draw, and therefore technology was used, which decreed the victory of the latter. Because of the controversies that have arisen, since 2016 the regulation of the palio for photo finishing has changed: the latter can be used only if requested by the finishing judge, by the Cavaliere del Carroccio and by at least one of the three magistrates.

== The contrade ==
=== The eight historic contrade ===
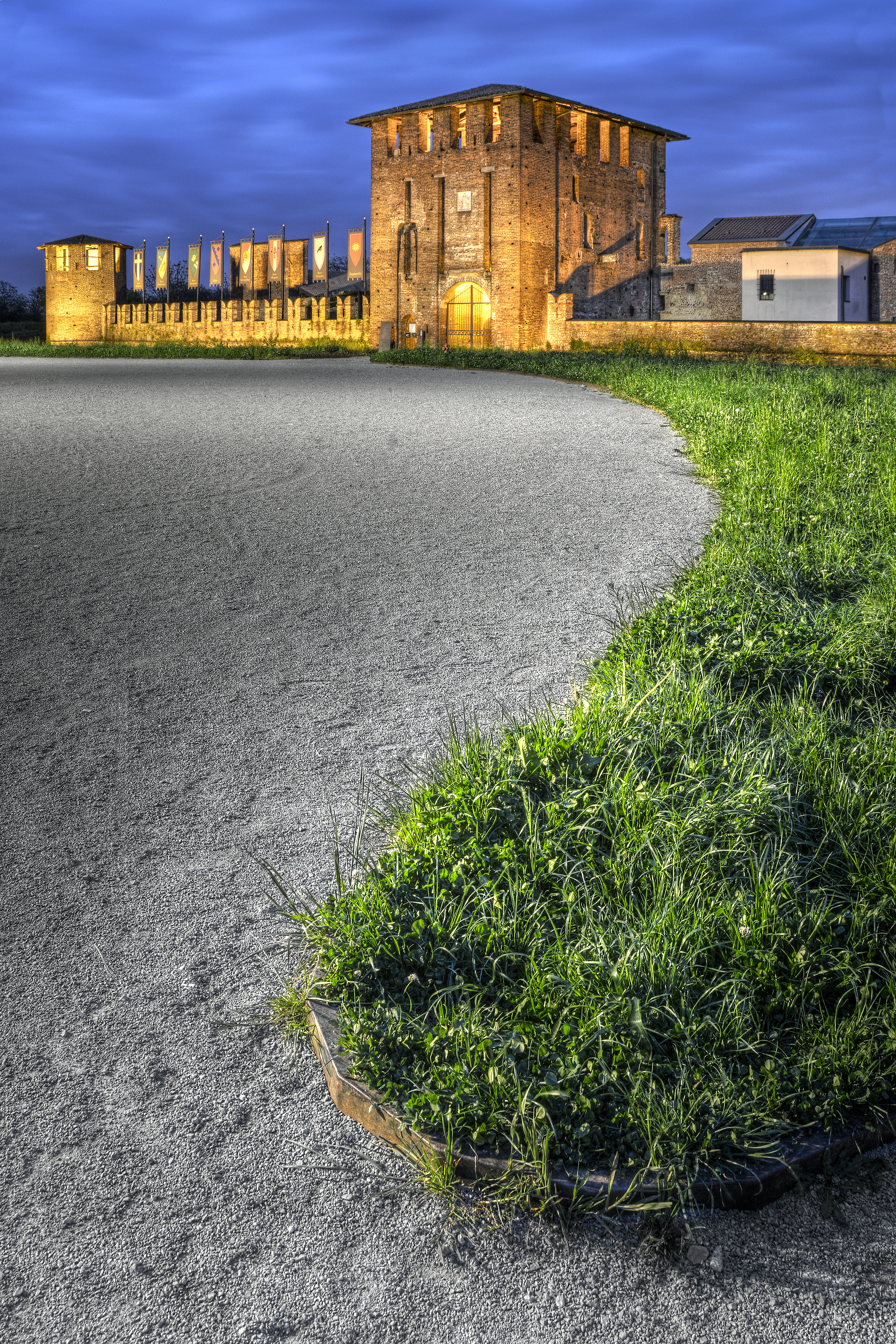
Visconteo Castle of Legnano, headquarters of Collegio dei Capitani e delle Contrade

The eight contrade of Legnano are:

- Contrada La Flora
- Contrada Legnarello
- Contrada San Bernardino
- Contrada San Domenico
- Contrada San Magno
- Contrada San Martino
- Contrada Sant'Ambrogio
- Contrada Sant'Erasmo

Each of the eight contrade has a regency formed by a "captain", a "great prior" and a "chatelaine". The captains of the eight historical contrade are gathered in the college of captains and contrade, which was founded in 1955 and which has the function of coordinating the activities, actions and intentions of the same. This college, which is presided over by the "grand master of the college of captains and contrade", is located within the Visconteo Castle of Legnano.

The antagonism and the competition between the contrade are very much felt, with a strong goliardic component and particularly in the period of the year in which the palio is organized, without prejudice to the strong mutual respect that leads to reciprocal aid in the organization of the event as in the case, for example, of the frequent exchanges of the material used in the parade. To avoid the pranks, which are frequent near the date of the palio, the horses that will participate in the horse race, on the eve of the latter, are hidden in a secret place and cared for by the Contrada members.

There are two contrade that have an additional title in the name; San Magno has in its name the term "Noble", which derives from the territory of the contrada, which includes the historic center of Legnano, and from the fact that since ancient times, within the confines of the contrada, there are several noble families lineage, while La Flora boasts the title of "sovereign", an attribution granted by the House of Savoy in 2002.

=== The activities of the contrade ===
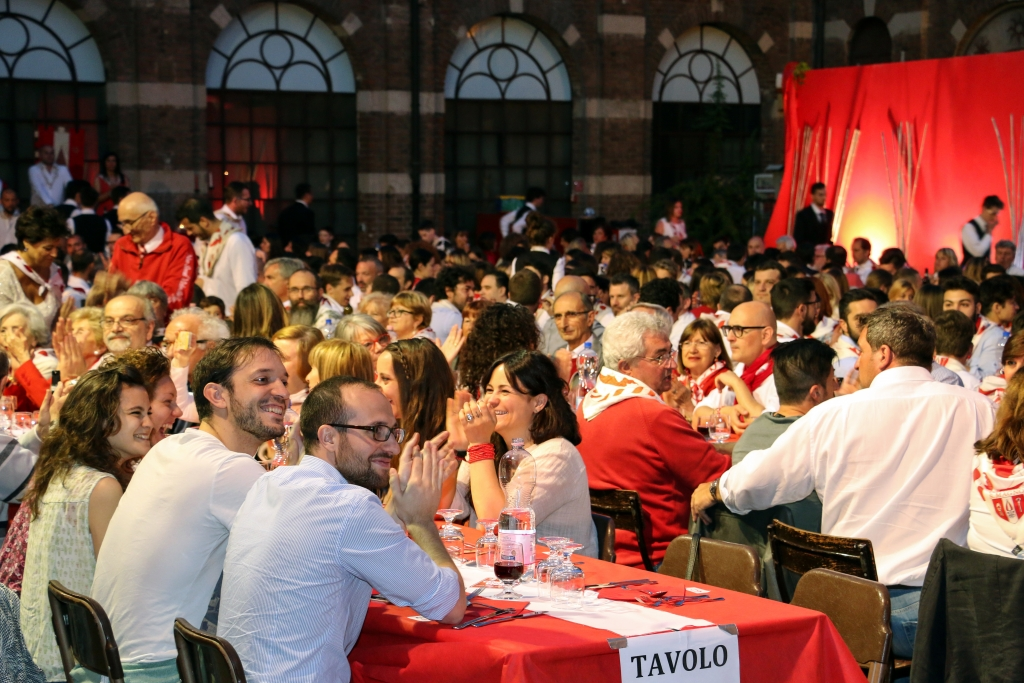
Propitiatory dinner in the Contrada San Magno for the Palio di Legnano 2015. In the background, Palazzo Leone da Perego

During the year the contrade organize parties, cultural and historical events, as well as folkloristic and charitable events. In the first decades of existence of the event, their headquarters were frequented only during the previous month at the palio, but with the passing of the years the activities of the contrade experienced a constant phase of growth that led the historical contrade to diversify the initiatives, with the organization of the latter taking place throughout the year. The contrade were often protagonists, even financially, in the restoration of historic buildings in the contrada, such as the churches to which the contrade refer.

Of great attraction is the propitiatory dinner on the eve, which is organized the evening before the palio and which is greeted by the contrada decked out for a party, attended by hundreds of contrada members and the jockey who will race the horse race.

=== The manors ===
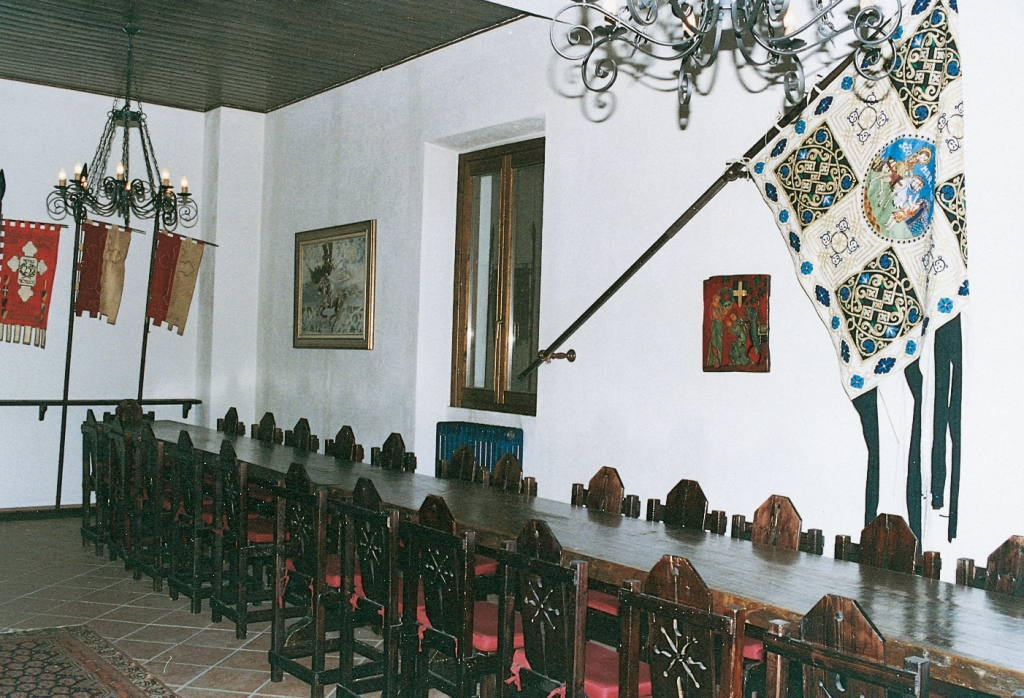
Maniero of Contrada San Martino

The contrade are located in the so-called manieri ("manors"); sometimes the manors, which are the property of the contrade, are housed in ancient Lombard courts, that is to say in buildings particularly linked to the territory, especially to that of the historical contrada of which they are the seat.

The manors house all the activities of the contrada as well as the costumes, weapons and ornaments of the medieval pageant, the memorabilia and the banners - both of the present and of the past - as well as the documentary archive of the contrada.

=== The contrade suppressed ===
- Contrada Olmina
- Contrada Ponzella

In the first years in which the Palio di Legnano was disputed there were also the contrade of "Ponzella" and of "Olmina", which were incorporated, respectively, by San Bernardino and La Flora (in 1936) and by Legnarello (in 1937); they were merged in the 1930s because at the time the neighborhoods to which they referred were not very inhabited, and therefore had great difficulty in financially supporting the participation in the palio.

The banners of the two suppressed contrade still participate in the medieval pageant of the Palio di Legnano: in particular, they follow the banner of the contrade to which they have been annexed, supplies of their armed escort.

== The organization of the palio ==
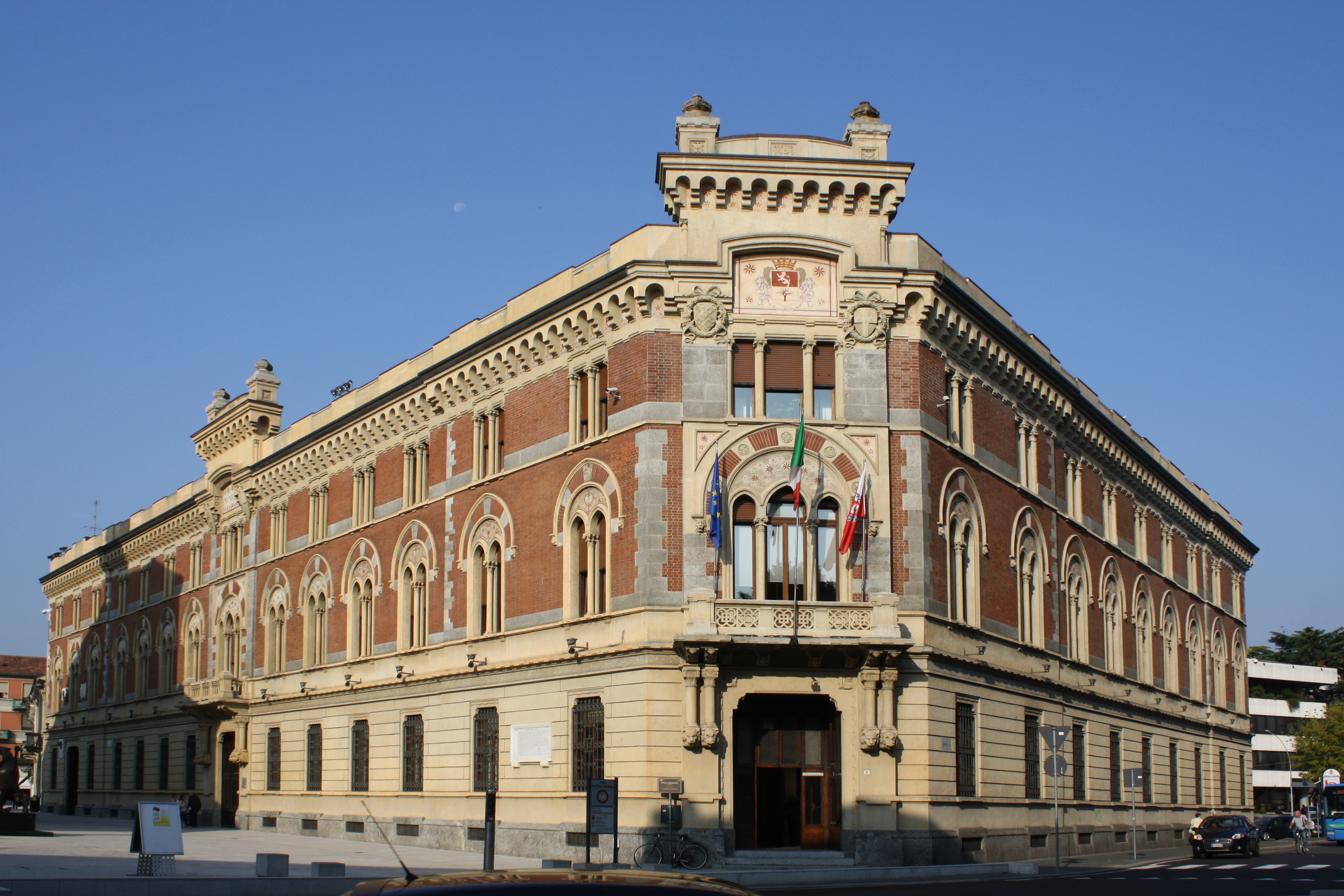
Palazzo Malinverni, seat of the municipality of Legnano

The reasons that induce Legnanesi to organize the palio annually with great profusion of efforts and means - including financial ones - are expressed in Article 1 of the regulation of the event, which reads:

[...] The Palio di Legnano is the historical re-enactment of the battle of Legnano which is celebrated every year in order to enhance the ideals of freedom and autonomy of the municipalities. The Palio di Legnano is the culminating moment of the cultural activity and social aggregation of the city contrade. [...] (Note: [...] Il Palio di Legnano è la rievocazione storica della Battaglia di Legnano che si celebra ogni anno al fine di valorizzare gli ideali di libertà e di autonomia dei Comuni. Il Palio di Legnano è il momento culminante dell’attività culturale e di aggregazione sociale delle Contrade cittadine. [...])

— Article 1 of the regulation of the Palio di Legnano

The organization of the palio, structured in this way since 1986, or since his leadership passed to the municipal administration, is led by the palio committee, which is composed of the "supreme magistrate", the "Cavaliere del Carroccio", from the "grand master of the college of captains and the contrade", from the president of the Famiglia Legnanese, from the "great priors" and other members who are representing the Municipal council, the Famiglia Legnanese and the college of captains and contrade. The supreme magistrate, who is the mayor of Legnano, decrees, through a public tender, the official start of the palio.

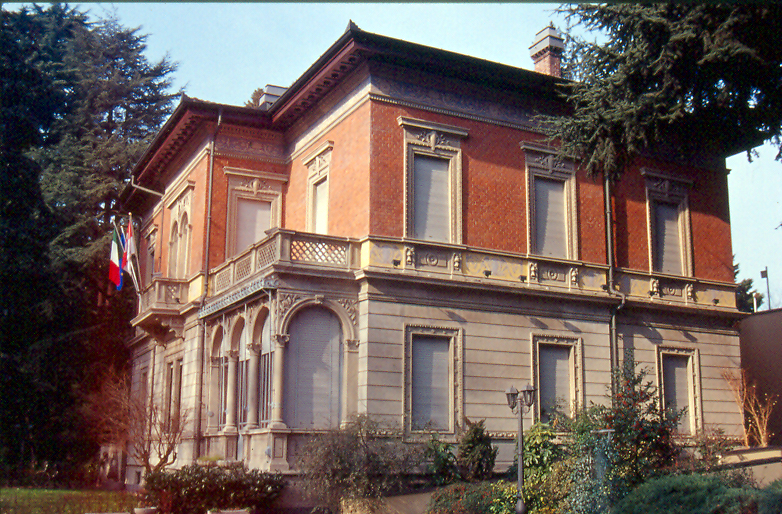
Villa Jucker, home of the Famiglia Legnanese

Then there is the "board of magistrates of the palio", which is formed by the grand master of the college of captains and the contrade, by the president of the Famiglia Legnanese and by the supreme magistrate, who chairs the sessions. This body has the function of resolving disputes between the contrade. Finally, to make sure that the ceremonial of the event is scrupulously observed, the college of magistrates of the palio and the Cavaliere del Carroccio, having consulted the palio committee, appoint two masters of ceremonies who come from the contrade and join the official master of ceremonies of the municipality of Legnano.

The Cavaliere del Carroccio, who holds the role of executive director of the organization of the palio, is appointed by the supreme magistrate after hearing the president of the Famiglia Legnanese and the grand master of the college of the captains and the contrade. A very important task of the Cavaliere del Carroccio is to name the mossiere (or the starter horse race). Until 1985 the functions of the Cavaliere del Carroccio were attributed to the president of the Sagra del Carroccio.

In the pre-World War II editions the organizational aspects were very different, given that they were strongly conditioned by political power. There was a council of the palio, which was formed by the political and military authorities of the fascist regime, by an assembly made up of the captains of the contrade, or by those who still hold the historic contrade, and by a so-called "Magistrate", which was a collegial body consisting of two members appointed by the beam secretary and the podestà of Legnano. From 1952, when the organization of the palio was resumed after the pause due to the war events of the World War II, the preparation of the event was entirely left to the Famiglia Legnanese. This situation lasted until 1986 when, as already mentioned, the organization passed to the municipal administration.

== The event ==
=== The preparatory events ===
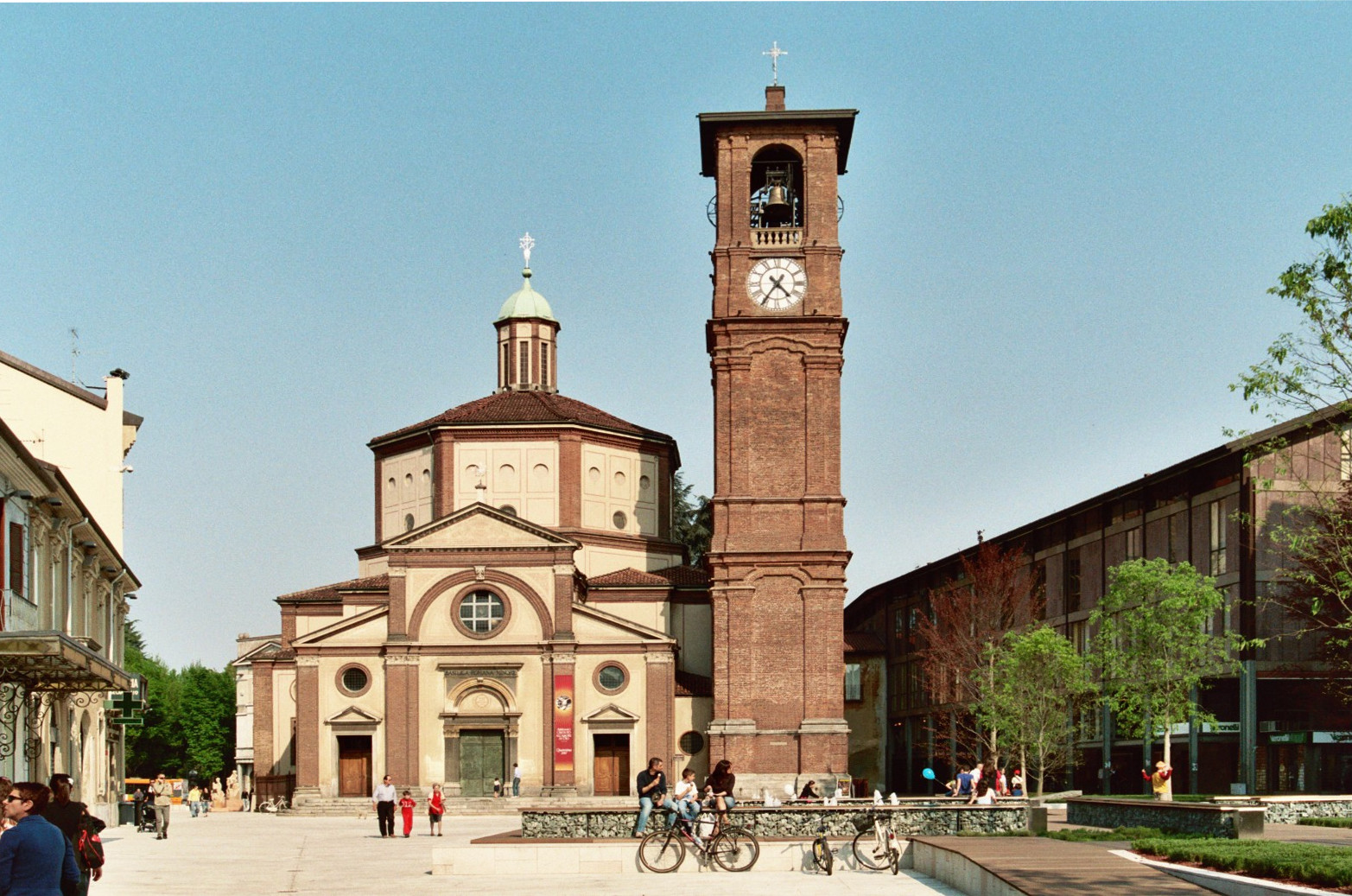
Square and basilica of San Magno in Legnano

The Palio di Legnano has a ceremonial including some important events that are preparatory to the medieval pageant and the horse race. The first of these is the "translation" of the cross of Aribert from the religious building of reference of the contrada that has conquered the previous edition of the palio, to the main church of Legnano, the basilica of San Magno. Shortly after, the supreme magistrate, or the mayor of Legnano, officially listed the palio with a public tender:

[...] You gentlemen have been summoned by me to listen to the reading of the announcement, by which We, the supreme magistrate of the palio, declare open the historic competition between the contrade of Legnano. The gentlemen will now receive a copy of the announcement, they will post it in their manors, they will spread it between the priory and the people of their contrade. [...] (Note: [...] Lor Signori sono stati da me convocati per ascoltare la lettura del bando, mediante il quale Noi, supremo magistrato del palio, dichiariamo aperta la storica competizione tra le contrade legnanesi. Lor signori ora riceveranno copia del bando, lo affiggeranno nei loro manieri, lo diffonderanno tra il priorato e tra il popolo delle loro contrade. [...])

— Announcement of the Palio di Legnano

Then there is the civil investiture of the captains of the contrade, which once took place on the day of the patron saint of the city, St. Magnus (5 November), but which since 2008 has been moved near the palio to provide this event better visibility. The text of the oath of the captains before the magistrates of the palio states.

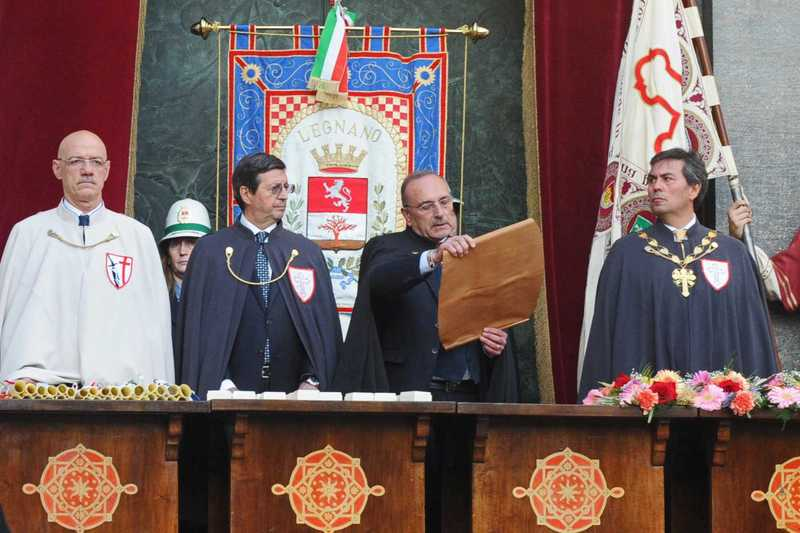
Registration of the contrade at the Palio di Legnano 2016

By the will of my contrada I assume the office of captain for the year of the Lord [current year] and in the name of our patron saints I promise loyalty to the colors of the contrada and loyalty to the magistrates of the palio. (Note: Per volontà della mia contrada assumo la carica di capitano per l'anno del signore [anno corrente] e nel nome dei nostri santi protettori prometto fedeltà ai colori della contrada e lealtà ai magistrati del palio)

— Oath of the captains during the ceremony of their civil investiture

Subsequently, the contrade officially join the palio, an event that is preceded by the solemn presentation of the regencies of the same. These events are heralded by the following speech by the Supreme Magistrate:

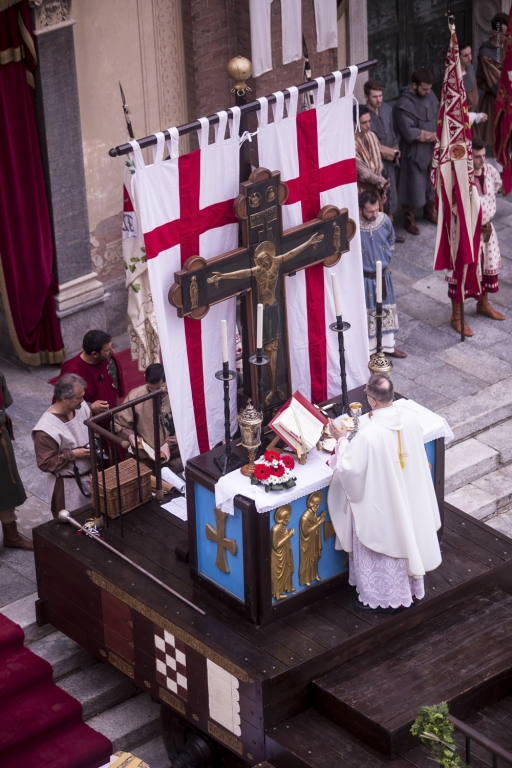
Holy Mass on the Carroccio for the Palio di Legnano 2015

[...] You gentlemen were summoned by me last April to hear and receive the announcement, through which we, the supreme magistrate of the palio, declared the competitions open between the contrade of the city for the conquest of the cross of Aribert. We are here with our approval to wait for their Lords to register their contrade, to present the captains, the chatelaines and the esquires. We will accept the registrations and give the "money" in order that everything is done as per consecrated tradition . [...] (Note: [...] Lor Signori sono stati da me convocati lo scorso aprile per ascoltare e ricevere il Bando, mediante il quale Noi, supremo magistrato del palio, abbiamo dichiarato aperte le competizioni tra le contrade della città per la conquista della croce di Ariberto di Intimiano. Noi siamo qui con il nostro beneplacito ad attendere che lor Signori iscrivano le loro contrade, presentino i capitani, le castellane e gli scudieri. Accoglieremo le iscrizioni e daremo il "soldo" al fine che tutto sia fatto come da consacrata tradizione. [...])

— Speech by the Supreme Magistrate announcing the inscription of the contrade and the presentation of their regencies

Then, on the third Friday of May, the vigil of the cross of Aribert takes place in the basilica of San Magno, in which the representatives of the contrade participate; this religious ceremony is characterized by a very precise liturgy, with specific sacred readings and songs.

The preparatory events continue at Palazzo Malinverni, the city hall, on the morning of the day of the race, on the last Sunday of May, with the surrender of honors by the grand priors, the captains and the chatelaines to the supreme magistrate and the representatives of the municipalities once coalesced in the Lombard League which annually appear in Legnano on the day of the palio. The ceremonial then continues with the oath of the representatives of the contrade before the copy of the cross of Aribert, with which the protagonists of the palio promise, similarly to what was done by the soldiers of the Lombard League before the battle of Legnano, unity and fidelity in name of freedom.

The ceremonial continues with a solemn Mass officiated on the Carroccio, on the occasion placed in San Magno Square, in front of the main entrance of the basilica and next to Palazzo Malinverni. After this sacred rite, doves are freed in memory of the famous legend told by Galvano Fiamma: the latter claimed that, during the battle of Legnano, three doves had settled on the antenna of the Carroccio causing the defeat of Frederick Barbarossa after leaving the burials of saints Sisinnio, Martirio and Alessandro (the so-called "holy martyrs", which are celebrated on May 29) at the basilica of San Simpliciano in Milan. The ceremony concludes with the religious investiture of the captains and the blessing of the horses and jockeys that will take part in the horse race.

=== The medieval pageant ===
Map of the route of the historic parade of Palio di Legnano

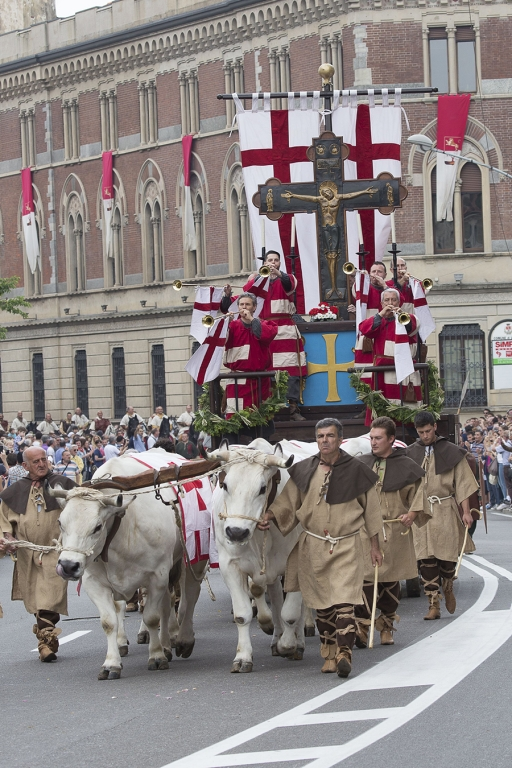
Il Carroccio during the medieval pageant of the Palio di Legnano 2015. In the background, Palazzo Malinverni

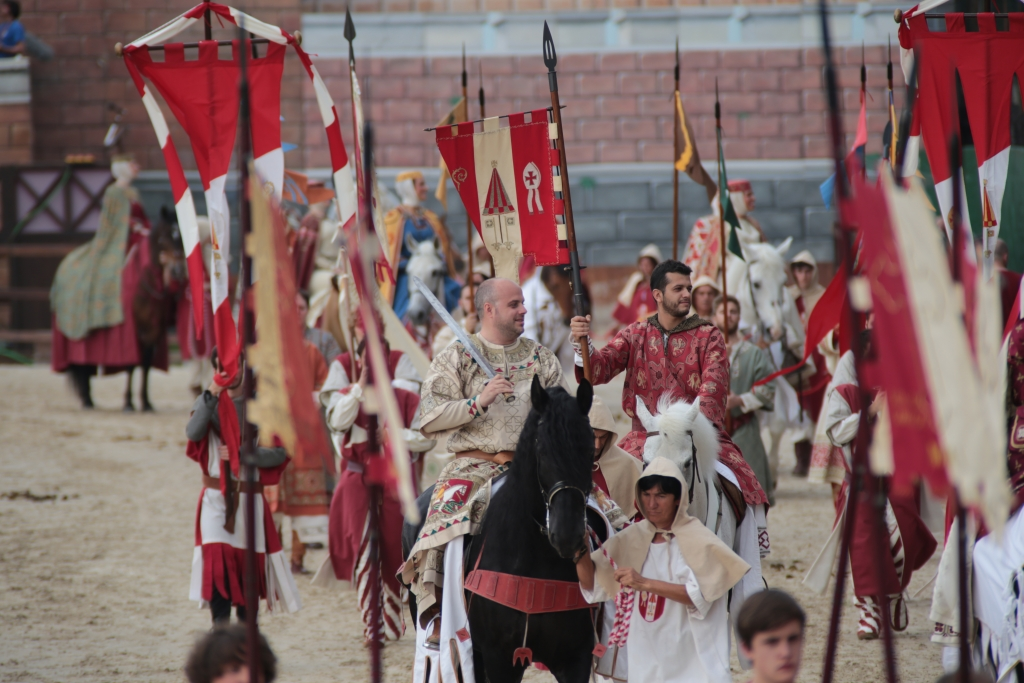
The medieval pageant of the Palio di Legnano 2015

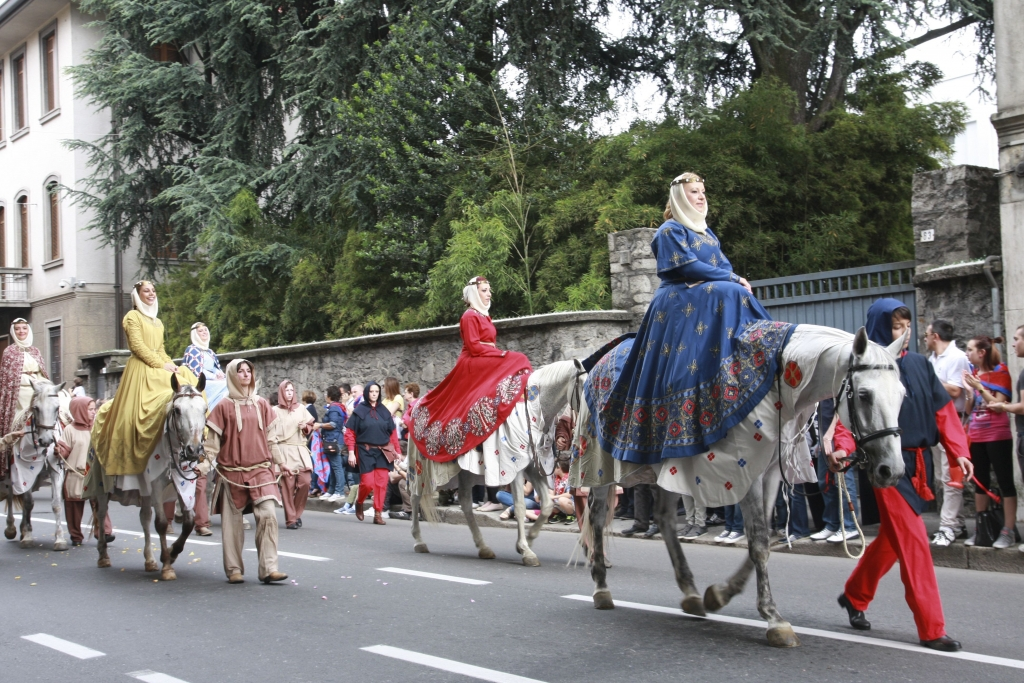
The medieval pageant of the Palio di Legnano 2015

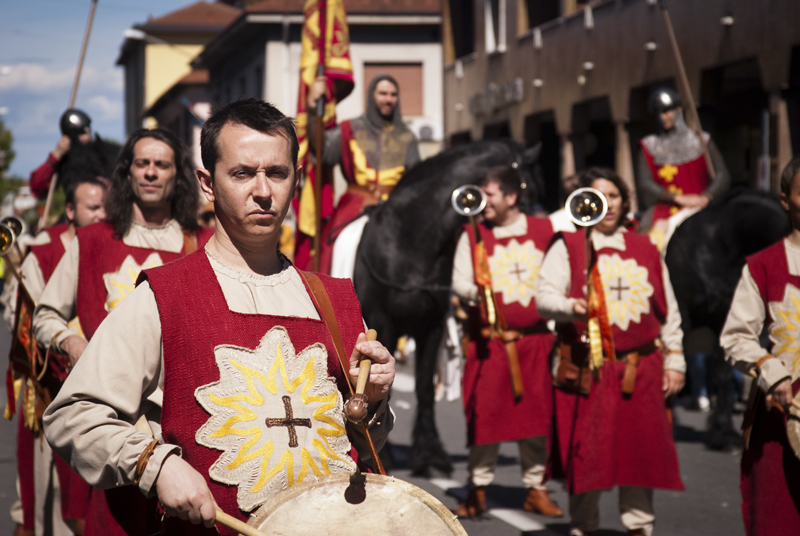
The medieval pageant of the Palio di Legnano 2013

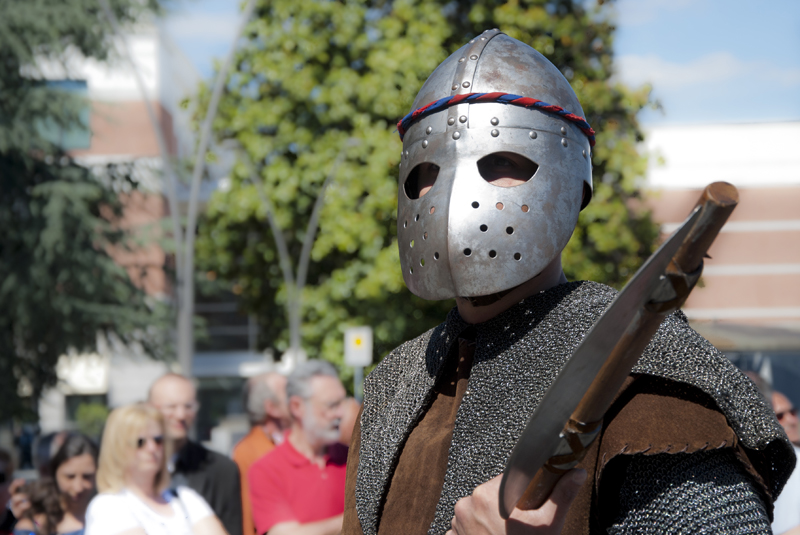
The medieval pageant of the Palio di Legnano 2013

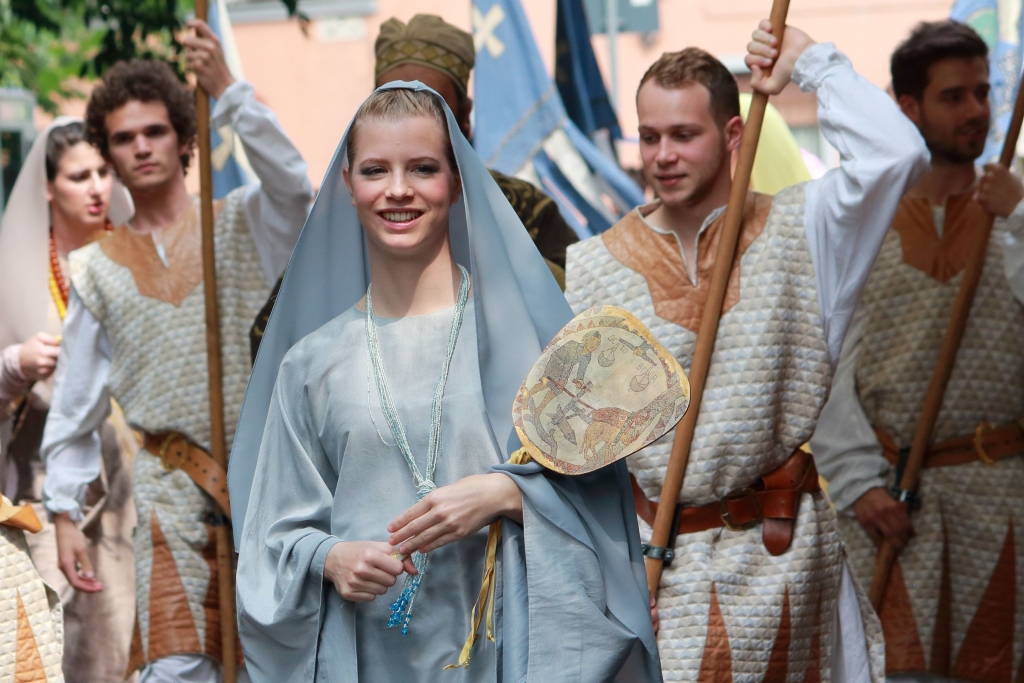
The medieval pageant of the Palio di Legnano 2015

In the afternoon of the day of the palio, shortly before the horse race, a medieval pageant is held on the streets of the city which consists of more than 200 horses and 1,000 figures in medieval costumes whose clothes, shields, weapons, etc., scrupulously reflect those of the 12th century. The contrade, whose registration to the horse race is optional, are instead obliged to participate in the horse show with a maximum number of one hundred and ten participants and sixteen horses. All the horses used in the parade are led by hand by expert grooms.

As already mentioned, the clothes used in the first decades of the events came from the La Scala in Milan, where they were mostly employed in the opera La battaglia di Legnano by Giuseppe Verdi. However, these dresses were designed for this lyric opera, and therefore their style was greatly influenced by Verdi's romanticism, so as to have a Renaissance rather than Romanesque style, that is the shape corresponding to the historical era in which the battle of Legnano was fought. The clothes used from 1962 onwards are instead commissioned by the regency of each contrada to specialized artisan tailors.

With the choice of creating an autonomous clothing collection, it was decided to focus on the 50 years before and half a century after the famous armed clash of 29 May 1176. Extensive studies were then carried out in order to be able to make clothes that conformed as closely as possible to the styles used in this historical period: in particular, the collection of sculptures created by Benedetto Antelami, a contemporary artist at the battle of Legnano who made a large number of statues, works that are very rich in details, especially clothes. The finds preserved inside the Vatican Museums, the Great Museum of the Duomo of Milan and in other exhibition spaces scattered throughout the Italian peninsula, Germany and France were also precious.

As already mentioned, the conformity that the material of the parade must have with the historical knowledge concerning the military and civil life of the 12th century is controlled by the permanent commission of customs. This commission, which consists of three experts of national caliber appointed by the organizing committee and two representatives per contrada, was established in 1990 by the college of captains and the contrade.

The parade begins with the processions of the individual contrade, which from their manor head into the city center for the actual parade. The latter opens with a procession formed by the bands of municipalities that were once coalesced by the Lombard League. Their members wear the uniform of the belonging musical body and carry the banner of their own municipality (the one in Legnano closes this part of the procession). The type of music played is military in nature.

The central part of the parade consists of figurants from the contrade who are dressed in medieval clothes. Each historical contrada passes by following a specific theme; the contrada that closes this part of the procession is the one that won the palio of the previous year, while the others parade, starting from the head of the procession, in increasing order of victories). At the same number of victories, the farthest from the show's head is the one with the most recent latest victory. The subjects represented by the eight contrade, which were introduced in 1996 to better represent the medieval atmosphere, are, are:

- Contrada La Flora: war;
- Contrada Legnarello: strength and work;
- Contrada San Bernardino: the triumph for the capture of weapons;
- Contrada San Domenico: the commoners and the games;
- Contrada San Magno: the nobility and the clergy;
- Contrada San Martino: music and dance;
- Contrada Sant'Ambrogio: the courtiers;
- Contrada Sant'Erasmo: astrology and hunting.

The medieval pageant through the city streets ends with the passage of the Carroccio pulled by six white oxen and by the transit of its armed entourage which is formed, among other things, by the figurants who interpret the chivalry of the Company of Death. The procession winds through the streets of Legnano to finish at the stadio Giovanni Mari, occasionally decorated with a medieval-style setting.

On the Carroccio there is a copy of the cross of Aribert (coveted palio of the horse race), an altar and the "martinella", or from the bell which in medieval times had the function of recalling the soldiers around the wagon. The martinella is made to sound inside the stadium at the end of the parade, after the pigeons have freed themselves in flight, recalling for the second time the aforementioned legend told by Galvano Fiamma. On the Carroccio there are nine figures, three with religious clothes and six with civilian clothes impersonating musicians, being provided with clarets.

In 2000 the original martinella of the Battle of Legnano was identified: it was kept on the bell tower of the hermitage of Sant'Alberto di Butrio di Ponte Nizza, in the province of Pavi, in Lombardy. In the same year in which it was made, it was paraded in the medieval pageant of the Sagra del Carroccio.

=== Events preceding the horse race ===
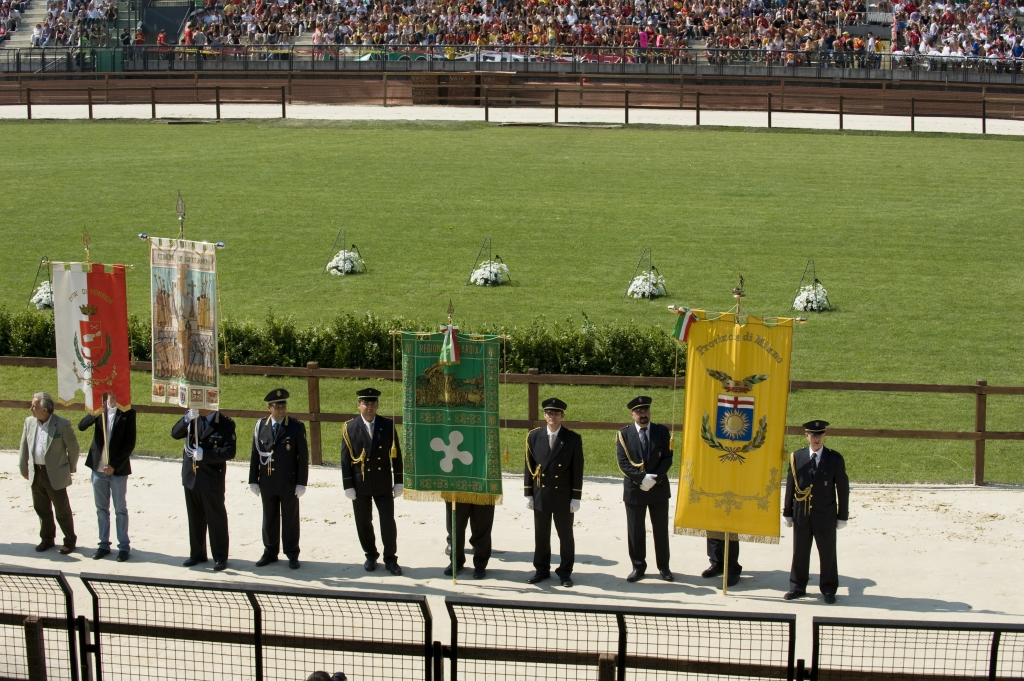
Gonfaloni at the stadio Giovanni Mari before the horse race of Palio di Legnano 2014

Other highly symbolic moments are planned inside the stadium. Initially the representatives of the armed forces present in Legnano (Carabinieri, Polizia di Stato, Guardia di Finanza and local police) parade, followed by the civic gonfalons of the municipalities that had once coalesced in the Lombard League, the flags of the Metropolitan City of Milan and the Lombardy Region, then the banners of the Milanese associations pass in procession and finally the gonfalon of Legnano parades; the latter then honors the authorities and other municipal banners.

The Legnano banner was paraded and the honors given to the other municipal banners and to the authorities, after the flag-raising of the Italian flag and the performance of Il Canto degli Italiani by Goffredo Mameli and Michele Novaro, the Italian national anthem since 1946, entered the stadium the representatives of the contrade, strictly in alphabetical order, with the contrada that won the last palio that closes this part of the procession; then enters the Carroccio pulled by six white oxen and the group of figurants, once formed by young conscripts stationed in the disused Legnanese barracks of the Italian Army, who impersonate the armed squad that defended this military chariot during the battle of Legnano; this phase of the palio is closed with the entry of the figurants who interpret the Company of Death.

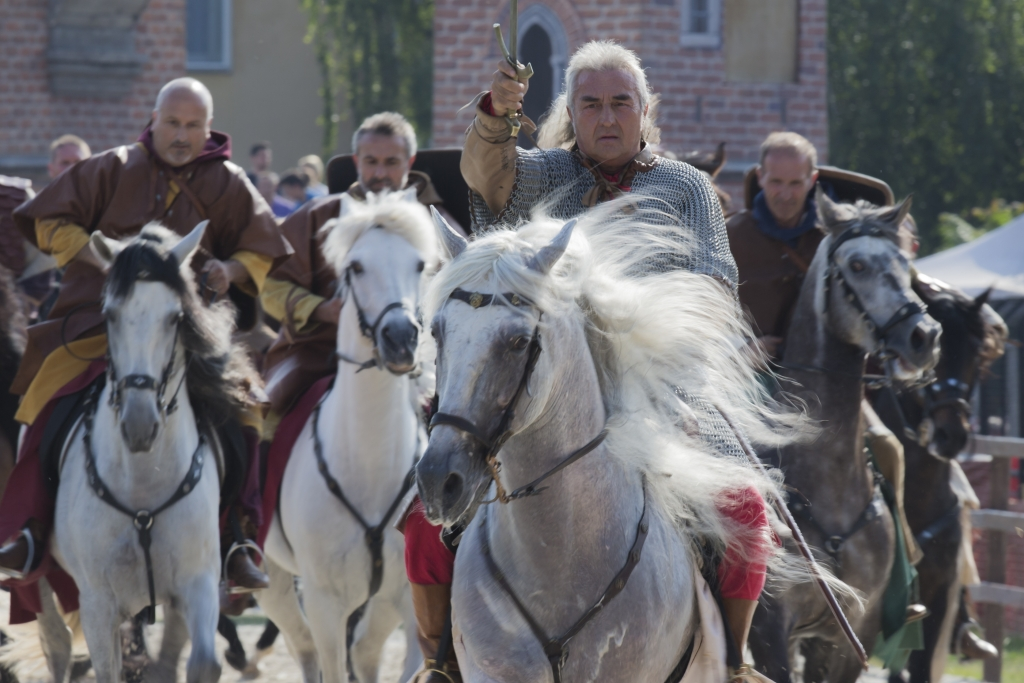
The Company of Death led by Alberto da Giussano who is preparing to carry out the charge during the battle of Legnano at the Palio di Legnano 2014

At this point of the event the representatives of the contrade move to the center of the stadium and solemnly pay honor to the Carroccio. During the ceremony the chancellor pronounces these words:

29 May 1176 - 29 May [current year]. Roll the drums! Arm yourself in defense! Ground the colours! Dames on your knees! Captains, to arms! HONORS TO THE CARROCCIO! (Note: 29 maggio 1176 - 29 maggio [anno corrente]. Rullino i tamburi! Armati a difesa! Gonfaloni a terra! Dame in ginocchio! Capitani all'armi! ONORI AL CARROCCIO!)

Immediately after the honors surrendered to the Carroccio the flight of the doves takes place, which is accompanied by the ringing of the martinella and by the sound of the clarions of the musicians of the Carroccio. Shortly after the supreme magistrate decrees, after drawing lots, the eliminatory batteries of the horse race. All the protagonists of this phase therefore leave the field in order to allow the figurants of the Company of Death, just before the horse race, to re-propose the charge that was made, according to legend, by the military team led by Alberto da Giussano in the final stages of the battle of Legnano.

=== The horse race ===
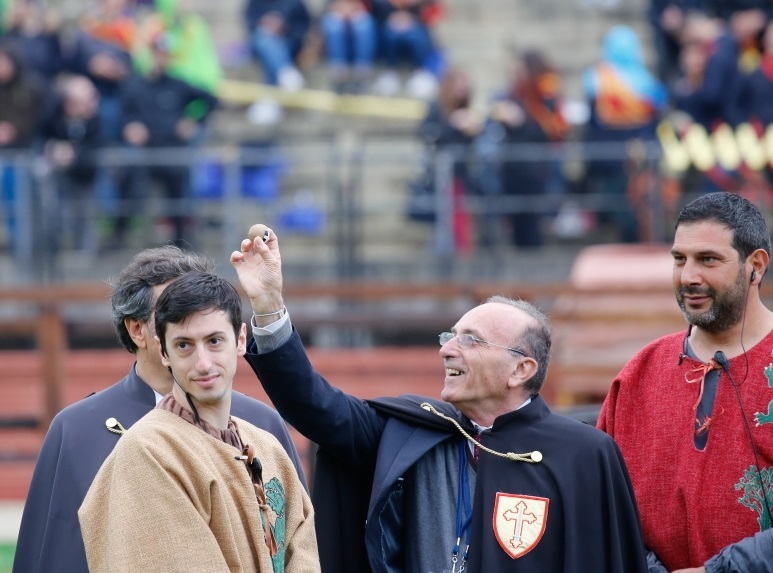
Draw for the horse race of Palio di Legnano 2016 carried out by the mayor of Legnano, here in the role of supreme magistrate of the palio

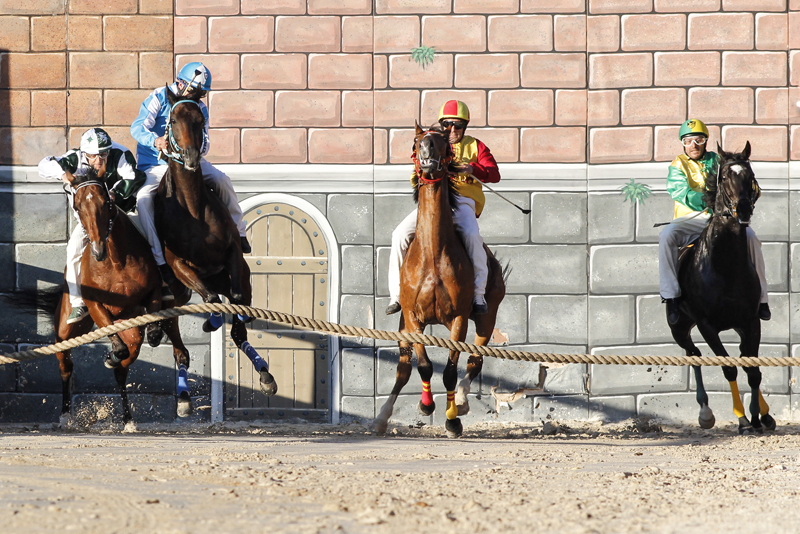
The start of the horse race, which is decreed by the lowering canapo (the front rope), of the Palio di Legnano 2013

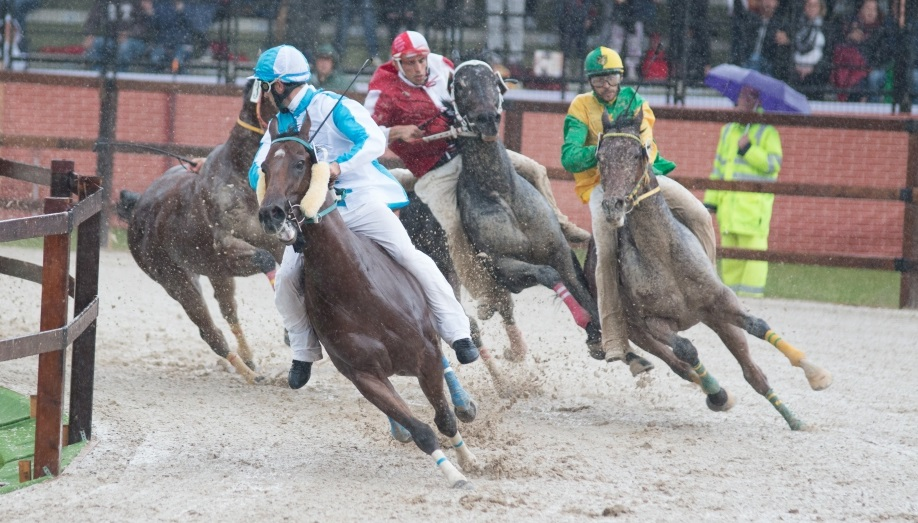
Horse race of the Palio di Legnano 2016. On the left you see a horse without a jockey, who can still compete for the victory of the race

The culminating moment of the palio is the horse racing with bareback riding which, as already mentioned, takes place in the city stadium. The race, in which the eight historic contrade participate, is disputed in the late afternoon of the last Sunday of May.

The horse race, which takes place on sandy terrain, begins with two eliminatory heats, each of which takes in four contrade. In these eliminatory batteries the jockeys of the contrade must perform 4 turns of the ring, each of which measures about 240 meters. The final that assigns the palio, which is entered by the first two classifieds of each drum, includes 5 laps of the ring. The horse race can also be won by a horse that remains without the jockey's mount during a race, as long as it does not violate the regulation. As for the jockeys, the regulation does not specify any limitation on their choice by the contrade.

The composition of the batteries and the order of arrangement of the horses at the rope (from the closest to the fence to the most external), as already mentioned, are defined by a draw that takes place before the race. The one who starts the horses in the eliminatory heats and in the final is the mossiere (or the starter of horse race), who is invested with his role by the Cavaliere del Carroccio and who decrees the departure with the lowering of the rope.

On the evening of Friday before the horse race the so-called "provaccia" takes place, that is a race that is disputed with the same regulation of the palio in which the emerging or local jockeys participate. The provaccia, which is dedicated to Luigi Favari, former president of the organizing committee of the palio, is preceded by another horse race which, this time, includes ponies ridden by very young jockeys. The provaccia was introduced in 1985 on the basis of the enthusiasm arising from the organization of the extraordinary edition of the 1980 Palio; in the first editions, at the Luigi Favari memorial, other sporting events were associated such as football matches and tug of war competitions. It was the provaccia itself that recorded the only victory of a horse that remained without the jockey's mount: in 2017 Legnarello won thanks to a horse without the jockey that was thrown off during the race. If a contrada wins, in the same year, both the palio and the provaccia, it is said that it has fatto cappotto ("made a coat").

=== The symbols of victory ===
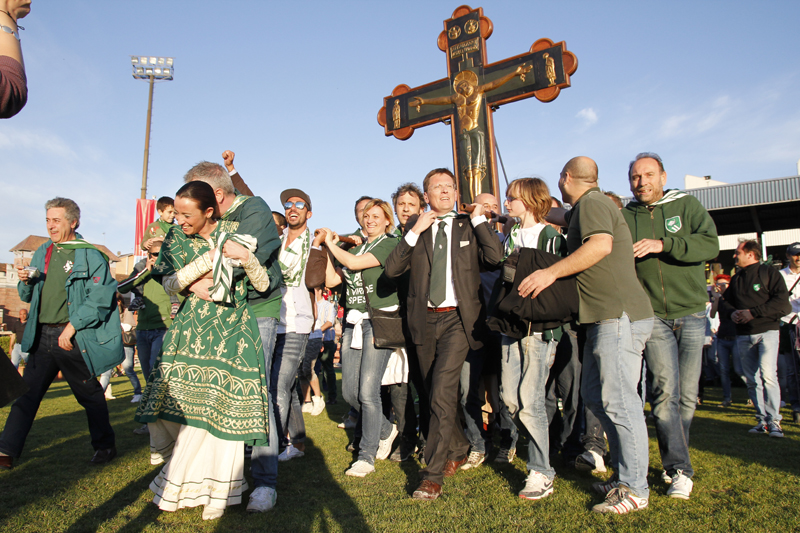
The reproduction of Aribert's Cross, coveted palio of the horse race, carried in triumph by the Contrada members of San Domenico immediately after the victory in the Palio di Legnano 2013

The contrada winner of the horse race has the right to preserve, inside the church to which it refers, the cross of Aribert, that is a copper-embossed sculpture of 1936 work of the Legnanese craftsman Luciano Sai that reproduces, on a reduced scale, the original medieval cross; the latter, which was donated to the monastery of San Dionigi by Aribert, archbishop of Milan from 1018 to 1045, is kept in the museum of the Duomo in Milan. It was realized thanks to the contribution of the local industrialist Pino Mocchetti, captain of the Contrada Legnarello from 1935 to 1936.

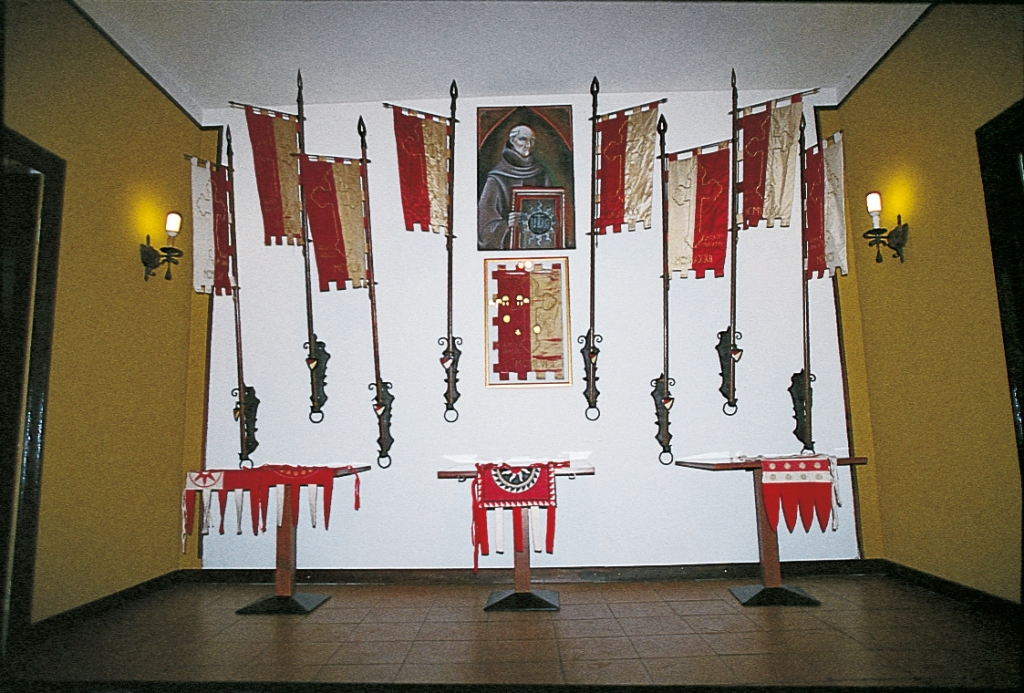
Interior of the manor of the Contrada San Bernardino. Around the effigy of Saint Bernardino, the victory bands are placed

The copy of the medieval cross is kept by the winning contrada until the next edition of the palio. Also the official ceremony that gives the cross to the winning contrada is called "translation of the cross": (Note: As already mentioned, this is also the name given to the preparatory ceremony for the palio which includes the return of the cross to the basilica of San Magno, delivered by the last contrada that won the horse race and given back to the community for the new reassignment.) this event takes place solemnly on the evening of the Saturday following the palio.

Other symbols of victory are the pectoral cross, or a golden crucifix copy of the precious object placed on the Carroccio during the battle of Legnano, which is assigned to the captain of the winning contrada and which is returned shortly before the next palio; the victory band, or a white and red banner (the colors of the Legnano municipal coat of arms) which shows the date of victory in Roman numerals and which is delivered to the definitive winning contrada; the weight of silver, which is a precious sculpture of 1176 grams whose weight recalls the year of the battle (1176) and which is delivered to the outright winning contrada, being created every year by a different artist. The silver weight, whose shape changes every year, was introduced in 1992 and recalls a similar prize awarded to the winning contrada in the first editions of the palio.

By tradition, at the end of the horse race, the monument to the Warrior of Legnano is caparisoned in the colors of the winning contrada. The contrada that has not won the palio for the longest time is instead called "Nonna" ("grandmother").

== Number of victories ==
- 13 - Contrada Sant'Erasmo (1937, 1939, 1958, 1964, 1969, 1970, 1974, 1975, 1976, 1994, 1998, 2002 and 2014)
- 13 - Contrada Legnarello (1936, 1952, 1953, 1954, 1965, 1966, 1983, 1989, 1991, 2015, 2017, 2023 and 2024)
- 12 - Contrada San Magno (1963, 1971, 1973, 1979, 1987, 1990, 1993, 1999, 2000, 2001, 2011 and 2022)
- 9 - Contrada San Bernardino (1956, 1959, 1961, 1978, 1980, 1982, 1985, 1995 and 2007)
- 9 - Contrada La Flora (1938, 1960, 1997, 2005, 2008, 2009, 2010, 2018 and 2021)
- 7 - Contrada San Domenico (1935, 1972, 1981, 1984, 1996, 2013 and 2019)
- 6 - Contrada Sant'Ambrogio (1962, 1968, 1986, 1988, 2004 and 2012)
- 5 - Contrada San Martino (1957, 1967, 1992, 2003 and 2016)

=== Last winner ===
- Contrada Legnarello (2024)

== Gallery ==
Palio di Legnano Gallery
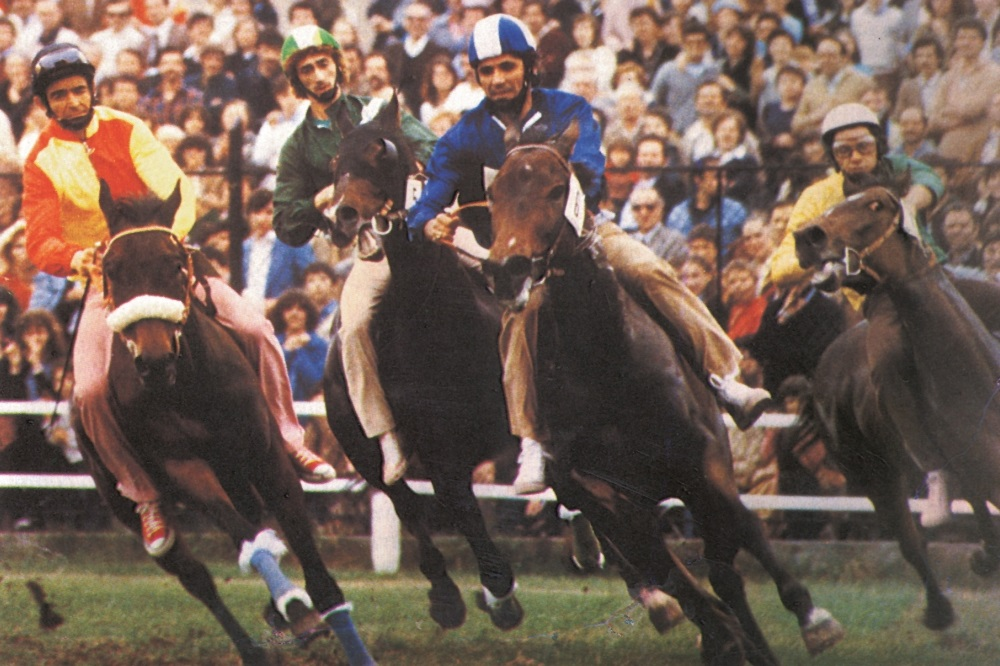
Horse race at the Palio di Legnano 1979. From left to right we can recognize the jockeys Canapino (Leonardo Viti), Truciolo (Mario Cottone), Aceto (Andrea Degortes) and Noce (Luigi Croci)

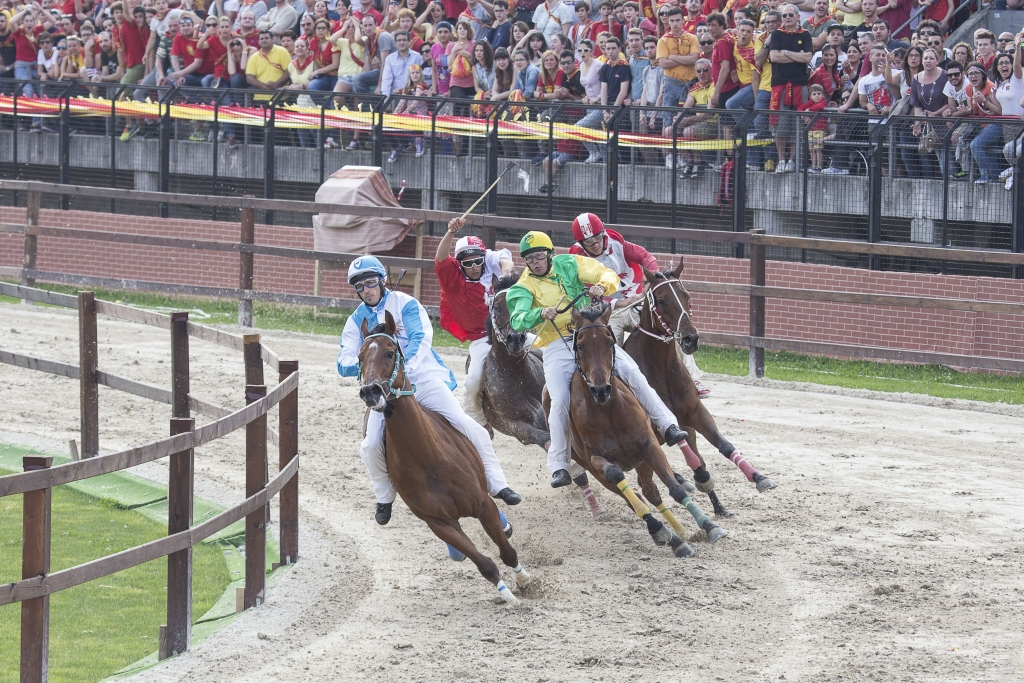
The horse race of Palio di Legnano 2015

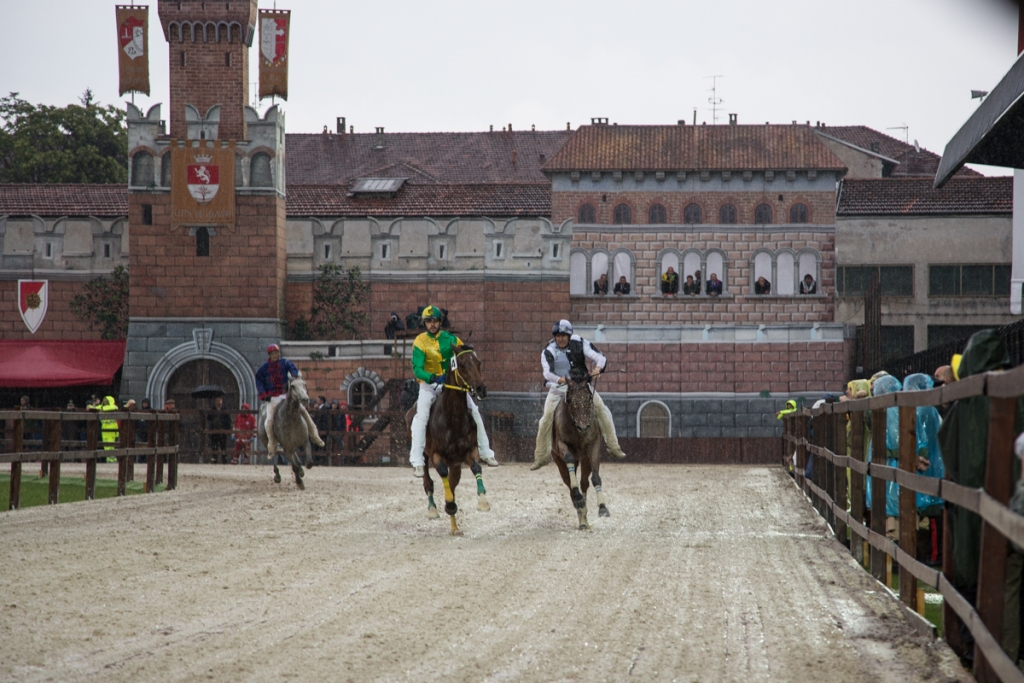
The horse race of Palio di Legnano 2016

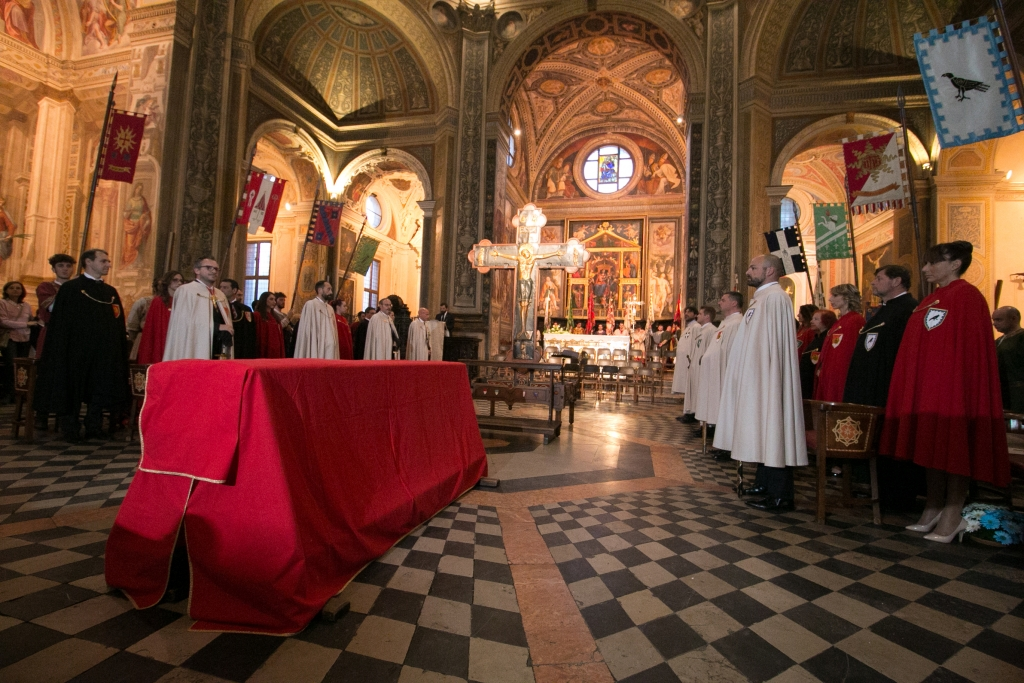
Vigil of the cross of the copy of the cross of Aribert for the Palio di Legnano 2016

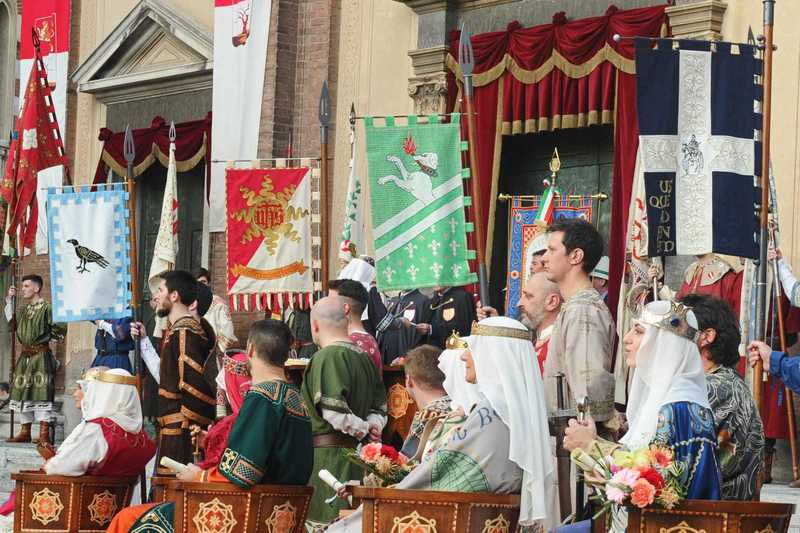
Registration of the contrade at the Palio di Legnano 2016

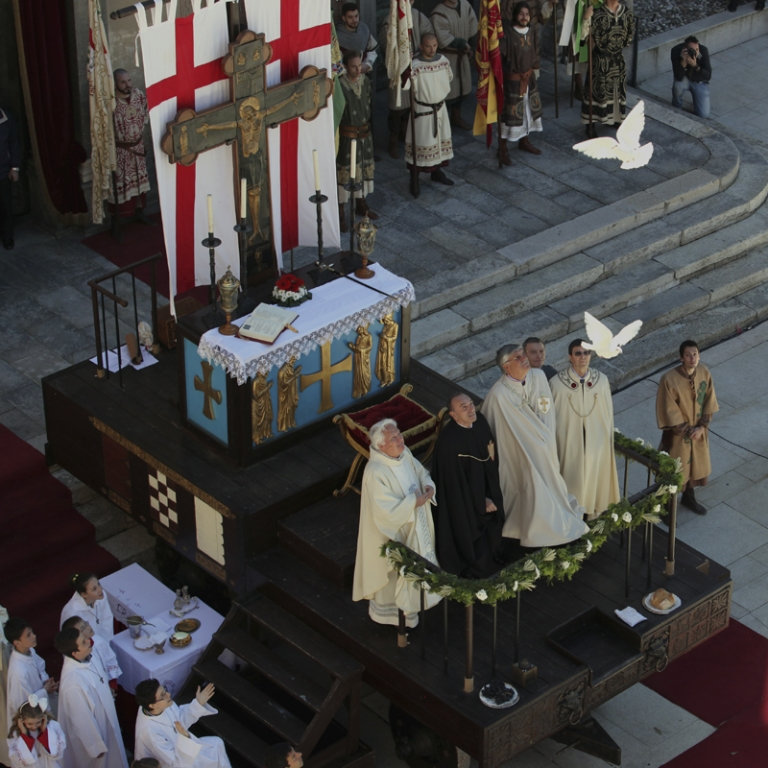
Flight of the three doves at the Palio di Legnano 2013

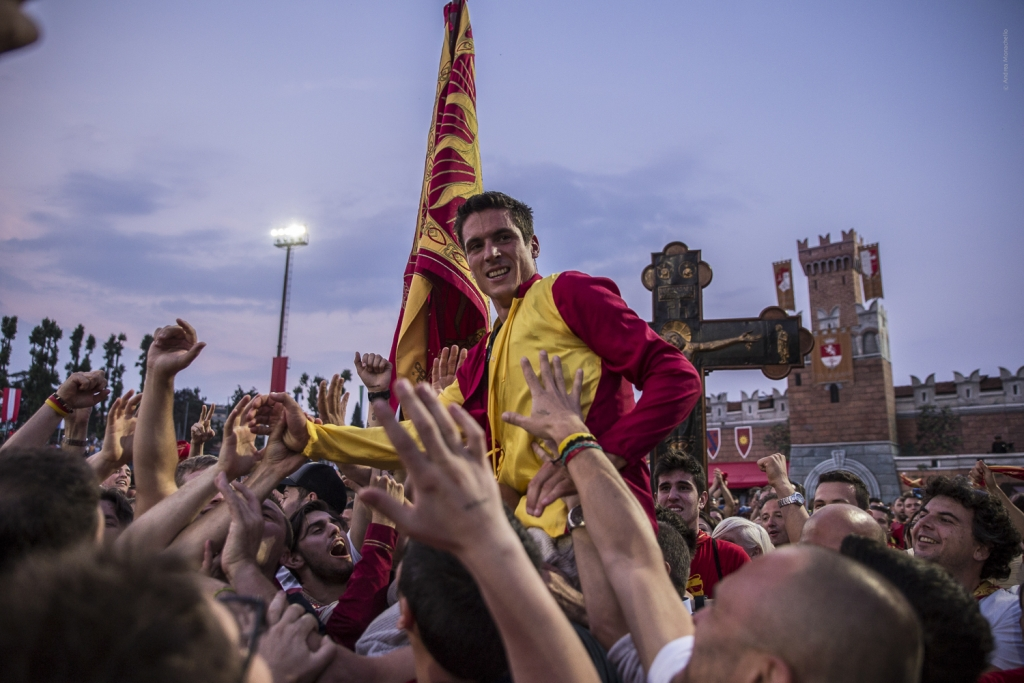
The jockey od Contrada Legnarello brought in triumph immediately after the victory at the palio di Legnano 2015

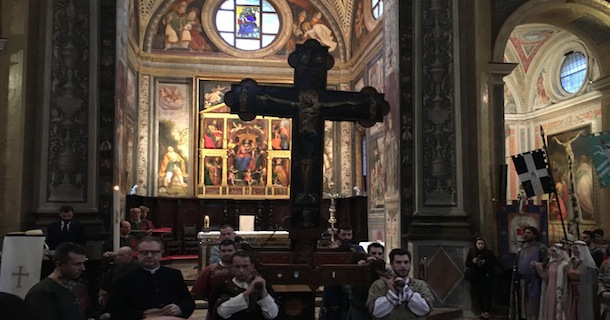
Translation of the copy of the cross of Aribert from the basilica of San Magno to the church of San Martino, a reference religious building of the contrada that won the Legnano palio 2016

== See also ==
- Battle of Legnano
- Contrade of Legnano
- Legnano
- Palio

== Bibliography ==
- (in Italian) Autori vari, Il Palio di Legnano : Sagra del Carroccio e Palio delle Contrade nella storia e nella vita della città, Banca di Legnano, 2015.
- (in Italian) Giorgio D'Ilario, Egidio Gianazza, Augusto Marinoni, Legnano e la battaglia, Edizioni Landoni, 1976.
- (in Italian) Giorgio D'Ilario, Egidio Gianazza, Augusto Marinoni, Marco Turri, Profilo storico della città di Legnano, Edizioni Landoni, 1984
- (in Italian) Giorgio D'Ilario, Sagra del Carroccio - Palio delle Contrade, Tipotecnica, 2000.
- (in Italian) Gabriella Ferrarini, Marco Stadiotti, Legnano una città, la sua storia, la sua anima, Telesio editore, 2001.
- (in Italian) Elena Percivaldi, I Lombardi che fecero l'impresa. La Lega Lombarda e il Barbarossa tra storia e leggenda, Ancora Editrice, 2009, ISBN 978-88-514-0647-9.
