= Pontida =

- Comune
- Città di Pontida
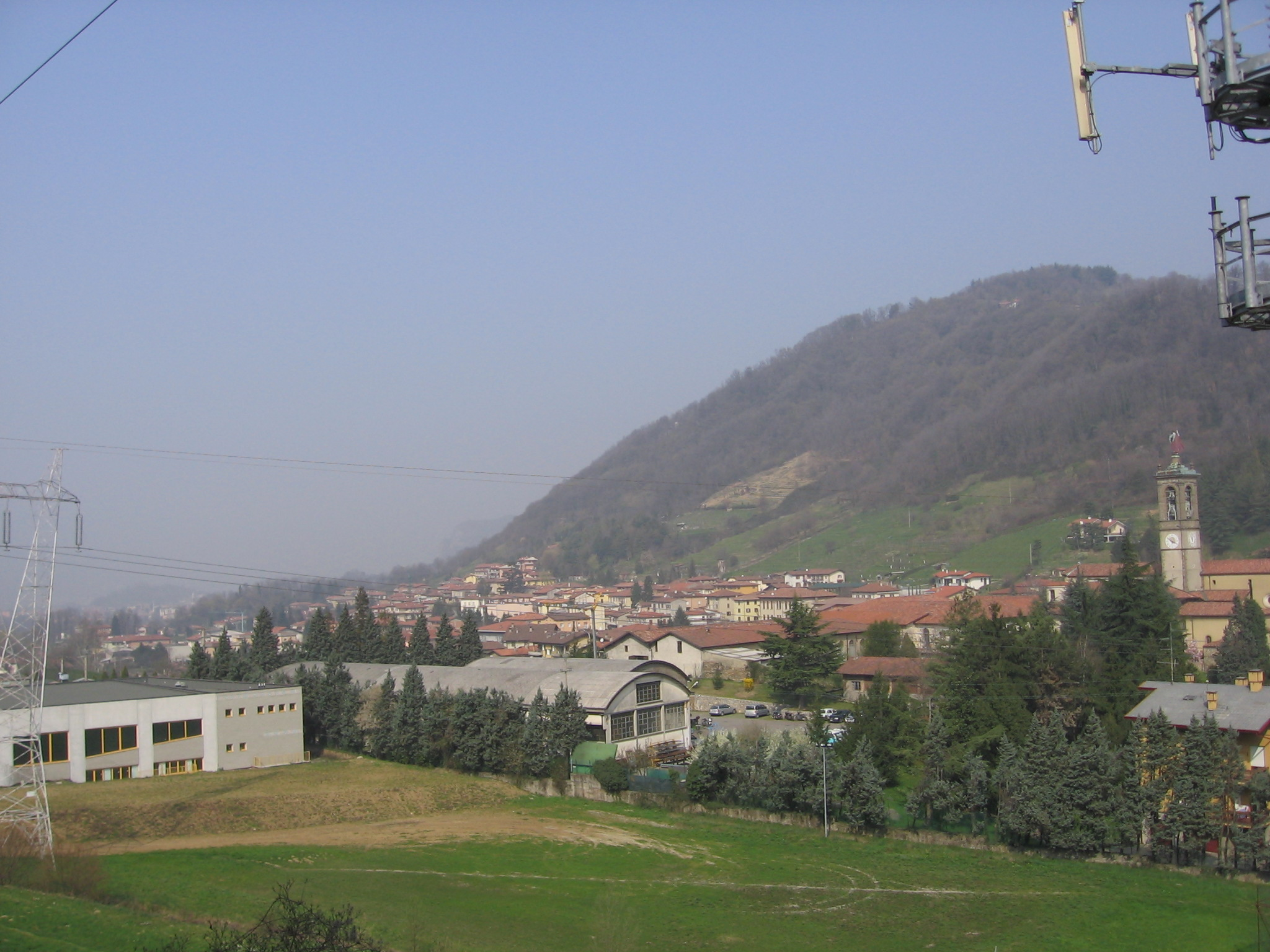
- Pontida

- Coat of arms

- Location within Italy Location within Lombardy
- Coordinates: 45°44′N 9°30′E
- Country: Italy
- Region: Lombardy
- Province: Province of Bergamo (BG)
- Frazioni: Boffuro, Buttarello, Cà Barile, Cà Frosco, Cà Pietaglio, Canto, Cerchiera, Costa, Gaggio Sopra, Gaggio Sotto, Ghiringhello, Grombosco, Gromfaleggio, Massera, Metà Ripa di Sotto, Odiago, Roncallo, Sotto i Ronchi, Torchio, Valmora

Government
  - Mayor: Luigi Carozzi

Area
  - Total: 10.38 km^{2} (4.01 sq mi)
- Elevation: 313 m (1,027 ft)

Population (1-1-2017)
  - Total: 3,303
  - Density: 318.2/km^{2} (824.2/sq mi)
- Demonym: Pontidese(i)
- Time zone: UTC+1 (CET)
  - Summer (DST): UTC+2 (CEST)
- Postal code: 24030
- Dialing code: 035

Pontida (Bergamasque: Püntìda) is a comune (municipality) in the Province of Bergamo in the Italian region of Lombardy, located about 40 kilometres (25 mi) northeast of Milan and about 13 kilometres (8 mi) northwest of Bergamo. As of 31 December 2004, it had a population of 3,112 and an area of 10.1 square kilometres (3.9 mi^{2}).

It was the location of the Pontida's Oath on 7 April 1167. Pontida received the honorary title of city with a presidential decree on 11 July 2006.

== Geography ==
The municipality of Pontida contains the frazioni (subdivisions, mainly villages and hamlets) Boffuro, Buttarello, Cà Barile, Cà Frosco, Cà Pietaglio, Canto, Cerchiera, Costa, Gaggio Sopra, Gaggio Sotto, Ghiringhello, Grombosco, Gromfaleggio, Massera, Metà Ripa di Sotto, Odiago, Roncallo, Sotto i Ronchi, Torchio, Valmora

Pontida borders the following municipalities: Ambivere, Brivio, Calco, Caprino Bergamasco, Carvico, Cisano Bergamasco, Palazzago, Sotto il Monte Giovanni XXIII, Villa d'Adda.

There is access from Pontida to Monte Canto, popular for mountain biking and mountain hiking.

== Demographic evolution ==
Historical population

Year	Pop.	±%
1861	2,323	—
1871	2,332	+0.4%
1881	2,373	+1.8%
1901	2,462	+3.8%
1911	2,624	+6.6%

Year	Pop.	±%
1921	2,747	+4.7%
1931	2,751	+0.1%
1936	2,633	−4.3%
1951	2,724	+3.5%
1961	2,661	−2.3%

Year	Pop.	±%
1971	2,666	+0.2%
1981	2,680	+0.5%
1991	2,672	−0.3%
2001	2,934	+9.8%
2011	3,210	+9.4%

Source: Data from ISTAT

== History ==
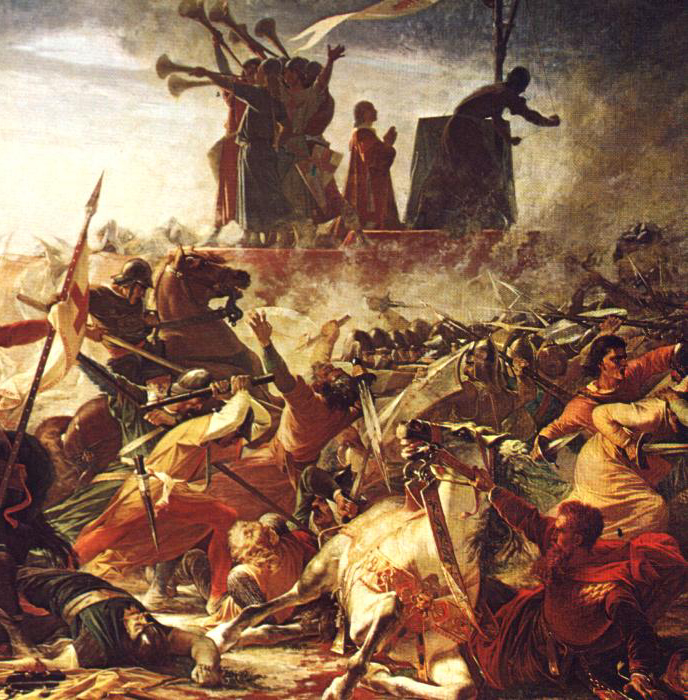
The defence of the Carroccio during the battle of Legnano (1176) by Amos Cassioli (1832–1891)

Pontida's main claim to historical renown is due to the Oath of Pontida, signed there in 1167 and marking the foundation of the Lombard League, which nine years later would go on to defeat Emperor Frederick I Barbarossa at the Battle of Legnano.

The "Oath of Pontida" often inspired Italian nationalists during the 19th century Risorgimento, struggling against the Austrian occupation, and seeing this historical event as a precedent and inspiration for their own struggle.
