= Battle of Cortenuova =

Battle in 1237 in Italy

- Part of Guelphs and Ghibellines
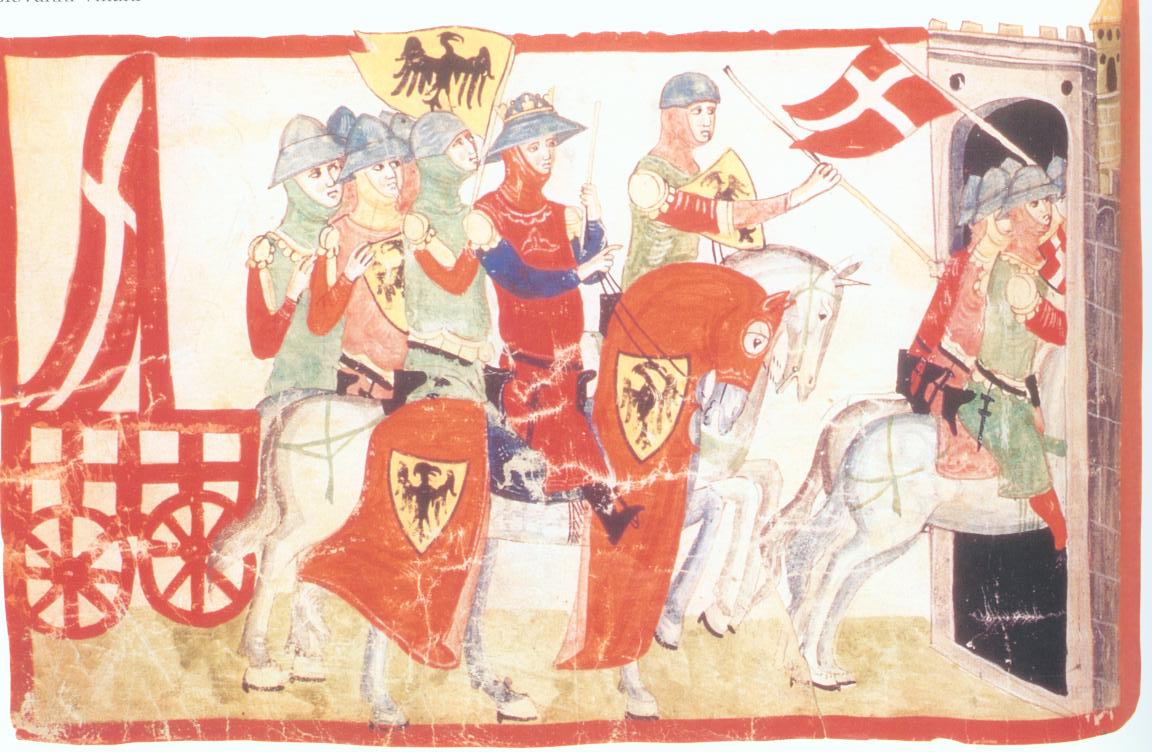
- Miniature depicting the capture of the Carroccio; Nuova Cronica Vatican Library Chig.L.VIII.296
Date	27–28 November 1237
Location	Cortenuova, Lombardy, Italy 45°32′N 9°47′E
Result	Imperial victory: League field army virtually destroyed

Belligerents
Holy Roman Empire; Kingdom of Sicily; Ghibelline cities Cremona, Pavia, Modena, Parma and Reggio	Lombard League; Milan, Lodi, Crema, Como, Bergamo, Brescia, Novara, Piacenza, Verona, Vicenza, Padua, Treviso, Mantua, Alessandria and Vercelli

Commanders and leaders
Frederick II; Ezzelino da Romano; Gebhard von Arnstein	Pietro Tiepolo (POW); Guglielmo I da Rizolio

Strength
~14,000–20,000 men: ~5,000–6,000 cavalry; 3,000 German heavy cavalry; 500 cavalry under Ezzelino da Romano; ~2,000 Lombard and Emilian allied cavalry; 5,000–7,000 Luceran Saracen archers; ~2,000 Cremonese and other allied infantry	~15,000 men: ~5,000 cavalry; 3,000–3,500 Milanese cavalry (Note: Estimated from Grillo's total of approximately 15,000 men, perhaps one-third cavalry, after accounting for 1,000 Piacentine cavalry and several hundred cavalry supplied by the other allied communes.); 1,000 cavalry from Piacenza; 500–1,000 cavalry from Alessandria, Vercelli, Novara, Como, Crema and Lodi; 10,000 infantry; 8,000–9,000 Milanese and allied infantry; infantry contingent from Alessandria; Milanese Carroccio with picked guard

Casualties and losses
Several hundred killed and wounded	3,000–4,000 killed 4,000–5,000 captured, along with the Milanese Carroccio

The Battle of Cortenuova (sometimes spelled Cortenova) was fought on 27 November 1237 between the army of Emperor Frederick II Hohenstaufen and the forces of the Second Lombard League, during the prolonged conflict conventionally associated with the Guelphs and Ghibellines Wars. It ended in a crushing imperial victory and the destruction of the League's field army. One of the largest and bloodiest pitched battles of thirteenth-century Italy, Cortenuova represented the greatest battlefield success of Frederick's reign and transformed the political balance of northern Italy.

The battle came at the culmination of a decade of major Hohenstaufen successes. Frederick had achieved the diplomatic recovery of the city of Jerusalem during the Sixth Crusade, reversed papal incursions against his rule in southern Italy in the War of the Keys, consolidated his highly centralized rule in the Kingdom of Sicily, defeated the rebellion of his son Henry (VII), restored royal authority in Germany and reconciled the Welfs to Hohenstaufen power, acquired direct authority in Austria and secured the election of his son Conrad as king of the Romans. Already the preeminent secular ruler of western Europe, after Cortenuova his position appeared still more commanding. The principal military coalition opposing him in northern Italy collapsed, cities submitted or opened negotiations, and the imperial chancery broadcast his triumph throughout Christendom.

The victory was also a major episode in the developing confrontation between emperor and papacy. The Lombard communes represented the principal political and military barrier to the extension of effective imperial authority across northern Italy, while Pope Gregory IX increasingly regarded their survival as essential to the balance of power on the peninsula. The captured Milanese Carroccio, ultimately displayed on the Capitoline Hill in Rome as a trophy of imperial victory, gave Cortenuova a symbolic resonance far beyond Lombardy and associated Frederick's triumph with the political imagery of ancient Rome.

Cortenuova was especially striking because the League had committed a large part of its available military strength to the campaign. Its defeat therefore reached beyond the losses of a single day: commanders and nobles were killed or captured, the principal communal field army disintegrated and Milan lost the ceremonial object around which the political identity of its army had been visibly organized. Yet the result also illustrates the distinction between battlefield destruction and political submission characteristic of warfare in communal Italy. Even a defeat on this scale did not extinguish Milan's institutional, demographic and financial capacity to continue resistance. The battle created an extraordinary opportunity for Frederick, but converting that opportunity into a lasting constitutional settlement required something different from tactical victory alone.

== Background ==
=== Imperial recovery and renewed conflict ===
In 1235 Frederick returned to Germany to suppress the rebellion of his son Henry (VII), restore political stability and strengthen the position of the Hohenstaufen monarchy north of the Alps. In the autumn of that year he also determined to resume the struggle against the Lombard communes which, supported diplomatically by Gregory IX, continued to contest the effective exercise of imperial authority in northern Italy. The fundamental dispute concerned both the political autonomy acquired by the communes and the extent to which the rights recognized in the Peace of Constance could coexist with Frederick's conception of imperial jurisdiction. Papal mediation continued throughout 1236 and 1237, but repeated negotiations failed to reconcile the two sides.

The strategic circumstances differed substantially from those faced by Frederick's grandfather during the First Lombard League. Frederick II could draw upon the fiscal and military resources of the Kingdom of Sicily while simultaneously mobilising German princes and extensive networks of Ghibelline support throughout northern and central Italy. The communes had also grown richer and more populous during the intervening decades, but Milan's regional power remained sufficiently threatening to ensure that numerous Italian cities considered imperial intervention useful for their own purposes. The conflict consequently remained as much a struggle among Italian political communities as one between emperor and communes.

Frederick entered northern Italy in 1236 and, with the assistance of Ezzelino III da Romano and other Ghibelline leaders, rapidly attacked the League's eastern network. Vicenza was stormed and sacked. Satisfied with the immediate results, Frederick temporarily returned north of the Alps, leaving Hermann von Salza, Grand Master of the Teutonic Order, deeply involved in negotiations between emperor, pope and communes. By the following year the emperor had secured Conrad's election in Germany and assembled fresh military forces. He left Germany in September 1237 for what proved to be the final time. The League remained active during Frederick's absence. Several communes adopted policies that sharpened the confrontation, while Piacenza moved into the anti-imperial camp. Brescia occupied an especially important strategic position between the imperial and League zones, and the routes between the Serio and Oglio became central to the coming campaign. Cortenuova itself lay along the communications linking Milan and Brescia, giving apparently local strongholds and river crossings significance within the wider operational contest.

=== Campaign of 1237 ===
Around 2,000 German knights accompanied Frederick across the Alps. Near Verona and Mantua they were joined by troops collected from Tuscany and the Kingdom of Sicily under Gebhard of Arnstein, including a conspicuous contingent of Muslim archers from Lucera. Sources give very high estimates for these Saracen troops, sometimes 7,000 or more. Ezzelino contributed approximately 500 cavalry from the Veneto, while Cremona, Parma, Pavia, Modena, Reggio and other imperial allies supplied cavalry and infantry. At the height of the campaign Frederick's total manoeuvre force may have reached or exceeded 20,000 men. The imperial advance immediately altered the political balance. Mantua chose submission rather than face destruction and received comparatively generous terms. Frederick then turned against Brescia. The important fortified settlement of Montichiari resisted for almost three weeks before capitulating on 21 October. Its roughly 1,500 defenders were captured and the town was burned, opening the approaches to Brescia.

The sequence revealed the breadth of Frederick's operational system. German cavalry supplied shock power, troops from the Regno supplied both cavalry and missile forces, and loyal communes furnished infantry, local knowledge, food and secure bases. This diversity allowed the imperial army to perform tasks ranging from rapid movement and raiding to the reduction of fortified positions. It also meant that Frederick was conducting war through an imperial coalition rather than a homogeneous "German" host. The threat produced an unusually large League mobilization. Milan supplied the core of the army and brought its carroccio, the ceremonial war wagon that functioned as command post, rallying point and embodiment of the commune itself. Piacenza contributed roughly 1,000 cavalry, while additional troops arrived from Alessandria, Vercelli, Novara, Como, Crema and Lodi. The League army probably numbered around 15,000 men, perhaps one third mounted. Its commander was Pietro Tiepolo, podestà of Milan and son of the Venetian doge.

=== Stalemate on the Oglio ===
The League occupied a carefully selected position near Manerbio. Rivers, marshes and the autumn rains created natural obstacles that made attack difficult and reduced the effectiveness of Frederick's cavalry. For several weeks the armies faced each other without decisive action as supplies dwindled and the terrain deteriorated. On 23 November Frederick began withdrawing across the Oglio, sending much of his infantry and baggage toward Cremona while retaining around Soncino a mobile force of German and southern cavalry, Pavians, Saracen archers and selected Cremonese infantry. The League concluded that the campaign was over and began its own march toward winter quarters.

The apparent stalemate was conditioned heavily by geography. The Oglio and the waterlogged ground acted almost as field fortifications, making aggressive movement difficult for both armies. The League had therefore succeeded in temporarily neutralising much of the offensive advantage created by Frederick's larger and more varied host. The result was strategically satisfactory so long as the League remained concentrated behind these obstacles. The danger came when that concentration dissolved. Once the imperial army appeared to be retiring toward winter quarters, parts of the League's communal levy were released and the remaining column began moving north and west. Frederick retained enough mobile forces at Soncino to exploit any opening. The decision placed the contest increasingly in the hands of intelligence, reconnaissance and speed rather than simple numerical superiority.

== Battle ==
=== Movement toward Cortenuova ===
The Lombard column moved west in difficult conditions. Heavy rain had turned the roads into mud, while thousands of soldiers, wagons, pack animals and the oxen drawing the carroccio had to pass through a limited number of crossings over the Oglio. The movement became progressively stretched and disorganized. The main body advanced toward Cortenuova while the baggage train, accompanied by Milanese and Piacentine escorts, remained several kilometres behind.

Frederick had maintained an extensive intelligence network throughout the campaign. Imperial supporters in Brescia reported League movements and Bergamese patrols shadowed the retreat. Once the Lombard column was identified between Cortenuova and the river, smoke signals were transmitted from Cividate al Piano through a chain of towers toward Soncino. Couriers then informed the emperor that the enemy was divided and vulnerable. Imperial propaganda subsequently portrayed the whole operation as a calculated trap, although the precise degree of premeditation is uncertain. Frederick's own early description called the opportunity both accidental and fortunate. What is clear is that he recognized the advantage immediately, concentrated the troops available to him and moved rapidly against the exposed League army.

The coordination with Bergamese forces was particularly effective. They were instructed to observe the League crossing rather than reveal themselves prematurely, and the signal was sent only after a large part of the communal army had committed itself to the route toward Cortenuova. The League, meanwhile, remained unaware that a substantial imperial force had halted at Soncino and was shadowing its movement from the opposite side of the Oglio. Its commanders had correctly used terrain to frustrate Frederick during the previous fortnight but now lost the informational advantage that had made the defensive posture effective.

=== Opening engagement ===
The battlefield stretched for more than four kilometres from the Oglio to the castle of Cortenuova. The first imperial attack fell upon the League's rearguard and baggage escort. Although surprised and outnumbered, the Milanese and Piacentines resisted fiercely for approximately an hour. Both sides suffered heavy losses before the defenders were forced backward, some fleeing while others joined the main League force concentrated around the carroccio.

The initial collision may not have been planned as the beginning of the general battle. The imperial advance force had been sent rapidly forward to close on the enemy, but encountered Lombard troops before the principal formations were fully deployed. The speed with which the local success was exploited was therefore crucial. Frederick pressed the main army forward rather than allowing the League time to reorganise its dispersed column, converting an encounter into a major engagement. By the time Frederick reached the principal battlefield, Tiepolo had established a broad defensive line near Cortenuova. The carroccio stood at its centre, while the communal infantry formed several close ranks protected by shields and presenting a dense wall of spears. Cavalry guarded the exposed flank and could launch counterattacks against weakened imperial formations. The position was strengthened by a shallow ditch.

=== Battle around the Carroccio ===
Frederick probably had more than 10,000 men available for the decisive engagement, making his army one of the largest and most formidable imperial forces fielded in a pitched battle in medieval Italy. Its nucleus consisted of approximately 3,000 German knights, reinforced by perhaps 2,000 or more Italian and southern cavalry. The army also contained large numbers of Saracen archers, selected Cremonese infantry armed with long-handled axes and troops from Pavia, the Veneto and the Kingdom of Sicily. The variety of these forces became one of the decisive features of the battle. The compact League infantry formation had repeatedly demonstrated that cavalry alone could fail against disciplined communal foot soldiers, most famously at the Battle of Legnano in 1176. Frederick therefore subjected the Lombard line to coordinated pressure. Muslim archers weakened the lightly armoured infantry with sustained missile fire; Cremonese assault troops attacked the defensive formation; and German, Pavese and southern cavalry launched repeated charges against increasingly strained sectors. The emperor's handling of the battle displayed considerable tactical flexibility: rather than merely relying upon the shock power of his mounted elite, he combined the distinct capabilities of cavalry, infantry and missile troops against the specific strengths of the communal formation.

The resistance remained fierce. A major Lombard cavalry counterattack broke into the imperial position, reportedly overrunning part of the Saracen contingent and causing temporary disorder before being stopped. The communal infantry nevertheless came under mounting pressure and gradually withdrew toward the carroccio. Imperial soldiers repeatedly reached the wagon itself, only to be driven back. Darkness finally ended the fighting after several hours. The League line remained physically intact, but its commanders judged their position untenable. The performance of the League during this phase was considerably stronger than the eventual rout might suggest. Surprised during movement and forced into battle before its full column had properly concentrated, it nevertheless created a coherent defensive position and resisted a larger combined-arms army until darkness. Its cavalry remained capable of aggressive counterattack, while the infantry maintained the traditional communal defensive system around the carroccio under sustained missile fire and repeated assault. The catastrophe came from the broader operational position and subsequent retreat, not from an immediate collapse at first contact.

=== Night withdrawal and pursuit ===
Tiepolo ordered a withdrawal during the night. The decision itself was militarily comprehensible: Treviglio, within Milanese territory, was less than twenty kilometres away and much of the army could potentially reach safety before dawn. The cumbersome carroccio had to be abandoned, although its great golden cross was initially detached in an attempt to save it. The retreat rapidly disintegrated. Groups became separated in the darkness, some wandering into Bergamese positions and being captured, while others drowned crossing the swollen Serio. Around 200 Milanese cavalry and 1,000 infantry escaped eastward toward Brescia; others eventually reached Milan by circuitous routes. At dawn the imperial army occupied the abandoned camp, capturing thousands of animals, wagons and enormous quantities of equipment. Pietro Tiepolo was among the prisoners, and even the golden cross removed from the carroccio was recovered from the mud.

The retreat illustrates the vulnerability of medieval armies once formation and command broke down. Darkness offered concealment, but the same darkness fragmented units, while rain and mud impeded men, horses and baggage. The swollen waterways that had previously protected the League became lethal obstacles during flight. Imperial and Bergamese forces could therefore convert the tactical victory of the first day into a much more destructive operational success on the morning of 28 November. The abandonment of the carroccio had consequences beyond the loss of equipment. The wagon was a visible embodiment of Milanese civic identity and battlefield cohesion. Its capture allowed Frederick to transform a military victory into a political spectacle that could be understood far beyond the immediate battlefield. The loss of Tiepolo, the senior Milanese commander and son of the Venetian doge, added another exceptionally valuable prisoner to that symbolism.

Contemporary casualty estimates differ greatly. A Milanese tradition records at least 500 cavalry and 2,000 infantry killed or captured among Milan's forces alone, while imperial reports claimed approximately 10,000 League soldiers killed or taken prisoner. The latter was probably a rounded figure rather than the product of an exact count, but the scale of the disaster is confirmed by the surviving evidence. A contemporary Piacentine account records about 800 Milanese cavalry and 3,000 Milanese infantry captured, together with some 300 allied cavalry and further prisoners taken by Bergamese forces during the flight. Taking account of these prisoners, the heavy losses sustained during the fighting itself, the collapse of the nocturnal retreat and the additional deaths during the flight, League losses, perhaps, amounted to approximately 3,000–4,000 killed and 4,000–5,000 captured. Imperial casualties were considerably smaller but substantial. The victorious chancery minimized them, yet independent evidence records hard fighting and deaths on both sides; several hundred imperial dead and wounded are plausible.

Of the battlefield, Peter de Vinea, Frederick's chief minister, recorded:

who can describe the heaps of corpses and the number of captives?... the Germans dyed their swords in blood;... the loyal Cremonese with the other states satiated their axes with blood; the Saracens emptied their quivers. Never in any war were so many corpses piled up; had not night come on suddenly, none of the enemy would have fled from Caesars hands

– Peter de Vinea, Ep. II. 3.

== Aftermath ==
The military result was devastating for the League. Its field army had effectively ceased to exist, a large portion of its political and military elite had been captured, and the loss of Milan's carroccio turned defeat into an extraordinary symbolic humiliation. Frederick entered Cremona in triumph. His elephant, originally received from the Egyptian sultan Al-Kamil, was fitted with a wooden turret containing musicians and armed men and used to draw the captured carroccio through the streets. Pietro Tiepolo was displayed in chains upon the wagon. Tiepolo was subsequently taken to the Kingdom of Sicily and ultimately executed at Trani.

The victory was immediately converted into a Europe-wide exercise in imperial propaganda. Letters announcing the triumph were sent to rulers and princes throughout Christendom. The Milanese carroccio was eventually transported ceremonially to Rome and displayed on the Capitoline Hill, accompanied by an inscription celebrating Caesar's triumph and the dignity of the Roman people. The procession deliberately drew upon the language and imagery of ancient Roman victory. Its political target was equally contemporary: the spectacle strengthened Frederick's supporters in Rome while humiliating Gregory IX and advertising imperial power within the pope's own city.

The consequences in northern Italy appeared equally dramatic. Lodi passed into imperial hands in December. Vercelli and Novara submitted early in 1238, while Savona and Albenga recognized imperial authority. The League effectively dissolved as a functioning military organization, and Milan opened negotiations. Its representatives offered substantial concessions, including recognition of imperial sovereignty, abandonment of the League and military service for Frederick. The emperor demanded unconditional submission, and Milan refused. The immediate diplomatic position was therefore paradoxical. Frederick possessed overwhelming bargaining strength but still confronted a political community whose civic institutions had survived the destruction of its army. Milan could lose thousands of fighting men, its podestà and its carroccio without losing its walls, government, fiscal machinery or capacity to mobilise again. The emperor's demand for complete submission collided with the commune's ability to continue existing after military defeat. This gap between tactical destruction and political extinction became one of the central limitations on what Cortenuova could ultimately accomplish.

Nevertheless, Cortenuova marked the most spectacular manifestation of a broader imperial zenith rather than an isolated peak followed by immediate decline. Frederick had already accumulated an extraordinary concentration of dynastic, diplomatic and political successes during the preceding decade, and his ascendancy continued for several years after the battle. In the immediate aftermath, however, the combination was especially striking: Germany was secure under the Hohenstaufen succession, Sicily remained firmly controlled, the strongest anti-imperial coalition in Lombardy had been shattered, and the emperor's triumph was being proclaimed throughout Europe. His already preeminent position among the rulers of western Christendom consequently was elevated still further, to a degree few of his immediate imperial predecessors had approached. The campaign also enhanced Frederick's reputation as a skillful military commander. The victory depended partly upon circumstance, but his exploitation of that circumstance was rapid and effective: intelligence and reconnaissance exposed the League's vulnerable movement, selected troops were concentrated quickly, and the battle itself saw a sophisticated combination of missile troops, infantry and heavy cavalry rather than dependence upon a single arm. Cortenuova demonstrated both his operational opportunism and his ability to adapt tactically to the peculiar strengths of the Italian communal armies.

Its political limits soon became apparent. Milan, Brescia, Piacenza and Bologna remained capable of resistance, and the economic and institutional resources of the communes allowed them to recover from even catastrophic battlefield losses. Frederick's siege of Brescia in 1238 ultimately failed, and by the following years the military struggle had resumed across Lombardy. Cortenuova consequently did not permanently resolve the constitutional dispute between imperial authority and communal autonomy. Its wider importance was nevertheless immense. To Gregory IX, the destruction of the League raised the possibility that Frederick might finally bring northern Italy under effective imperial control, leaving the Papal States geographically and strategically between Hohenstaufen Lombardy and the emperor's hereditary Kingdom of Sicily. The consequences therefore reached directly into the developing struggle between the universal claims of papacy and empire. Frederick's renewed excommunication in 1239 and the increasingly violent conflict that followed were directly linked to the altered balance created by his Lombard victories.

Cortenuova also occupies an important place in the history of medieval warfare. Sixty-one years after Frederick Barbarossa's defeat by the Lombard League at Legnano, his grandson achieved the opposite result against another great communal army. Improved intelligence, rapid operational movement and the integrated use of German, Italian, Sicilian and Muslim troops enabled Frederick II to overcome a defensive system that had once frustrated imperial cavalry. Yet the subsequent survival of Milan illustrates an equally important feature of medieval Italian warfare: even the destruction of a major field army could fail to produce lasting political submission. Still, Cortenuova was the greatest imperial battlefield victory of the thirteenth century, the most dramatic symbol of Frederick II's ascendancy and zenith, and a decisive episode in the escalating struggle between emperor, communes and papacy for the political order of Italy.

== Analysis ==
Cortenuova combined successful strategic preparation with unusually effective exploitation of a fleeting operational opportunity. The decisive element was not a single preconceived battlefield stratagem. Frederick had created conditions in which he possessed a large, mobile and diversified army, friendly bases on several sides of the League position and an intelligence network capable of following enemy movements. Once the League abandoned the security of its position behind the Oglio and began a difficult march through wet country, those advantages could be converted rapidly into battlefield superiority. The contrast with Legnano is instructive. Frederick Barbarossa had fought principally with a powerful cavalry force against a larger communal army whose infantry was able to maintain a cohesive defensive formation. At Cortenuova the imperial army possessed cavalry, infantry and large numbers of missile troops. The Saracen archers could wear down formations that heavy cavalry alone might struggle to break, while Cremonese and other infantry could exploit disruption before mounted troops delivered renewed attacks. The victory was therefore a product of combined arms as much as of heavy cavalry.

The League's defeat likewise cannot be reduced simply to inferior fighting quality. Its defensive position before the battle had successfully constrained Frederick for approximately two weeks, and its troops resisted fiercely once surprised at Cortenuova. The crucial failures occurred at the operational level: the imperial withdrawal was interpreted too confidently, reconnaissance failed to detect the force retained at Soncino, and the army became elongated during its movement across difficult terrain. Once combat began, however, the League still managed to form around the carroccio and resist until nightfall. Frederick's command performance was consequently strongest in the transition between intelligence and action. He did not wait for perfect information or for every element of his army to arrive. He recognised the temporary vulnerability of the League, pushed forward selected units and transformed an unexpected contact into a general engagement before the enemy could recover. The result displayed strategic preparation, operational speed and tactical flexibility working together.

The limits of battle as an instrument of policy are equally important. Cortenuova dramatically altered the immediate balance of power, but it could not by itself settle the institutional contest between the Empire and the communes. The battlefield created new possibilities for imperial policy; it did not determine how those possibilities would be used. Milan's refusal of unconditional submission, the survival of other major communes and the eventual recovery of the anti-imperial coalition demonstrate how difficult it was to turn even an extraordinary medieval battlefield victory into durable political control.

== Sources ==
- Abulafia, David (1988). Frederick II: A Medieval Emperor. London: Allen Lane. ISBN 978-0-7139-9004-1.
- Caproni, Riccardo (1987). La battaglia di Cortenova. Bergamo.
- Fornari, Carlo (2000). Federico II condottiero e diplomatico. Bari: Adda Editore. ISBN 88-8082-373-6.
- Franke, Daniel P. (2021). "From Defeat to Victory in Northern Italy: Comparing Staufen Strategy and Operations at Legnano and Cortenuova, 1176–1237". Nuova Antologia Militare. 2 (5): 27–52.
- Grillo, Paolo (2023). Federico II: La guerra, le città e l'Impero. Milan: Mondadori. ISBN 978-88-04-76912-5.
- Roversi Monaco, Francesca (2005). "Cortenuova, Battaglia di". Federiciana. Istituto dell'Enciclopedia Italiana.
- Stürner, Wolfgang (2000). Friedrich II. Teil 2: Der Kaiser 1220–1250. Darmstadt: Primus Verlag. ISBN 3-89678-025-5.
- Van Cleve, Thomas Curtis (1972). The Emperor Frederick II of Hohenstaufen: Immutator Mundi. Oxford: Clarendon Press.
