= Giuseppe Mazza =

Giuseppe Mazza may refer to:

- Giuseppe Mazza (composer) (1806–1885), Italian composer, conductor, and organist
- Giuseppe Mazza (painter) (1817–1884), Italian painter in the Romantic style
- Giuseppe Maria Mazza (1653–1741), sculptor of Bologna, Italy
