= Cuasso Castle =

- Italy
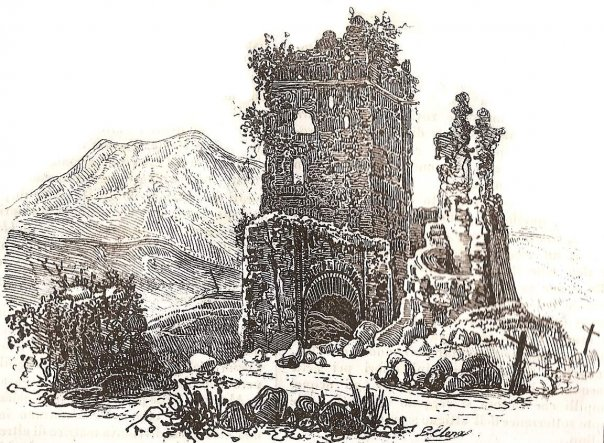

Site information
- Owner: Private property
- Condition: Ruins

Known as Castelasc in Lombard local language, the Castle of Cuasso (Italian: Castello di Cuasso) is one of the most important defensive buildings in the province of Varese and Insubria. Founded in medieval times, it stands upon a hill which gives name to the whole city of Cuasso al Monte. Nowadays only ruins remain of the ancient structure.

== Structure and present conditions of the building ==
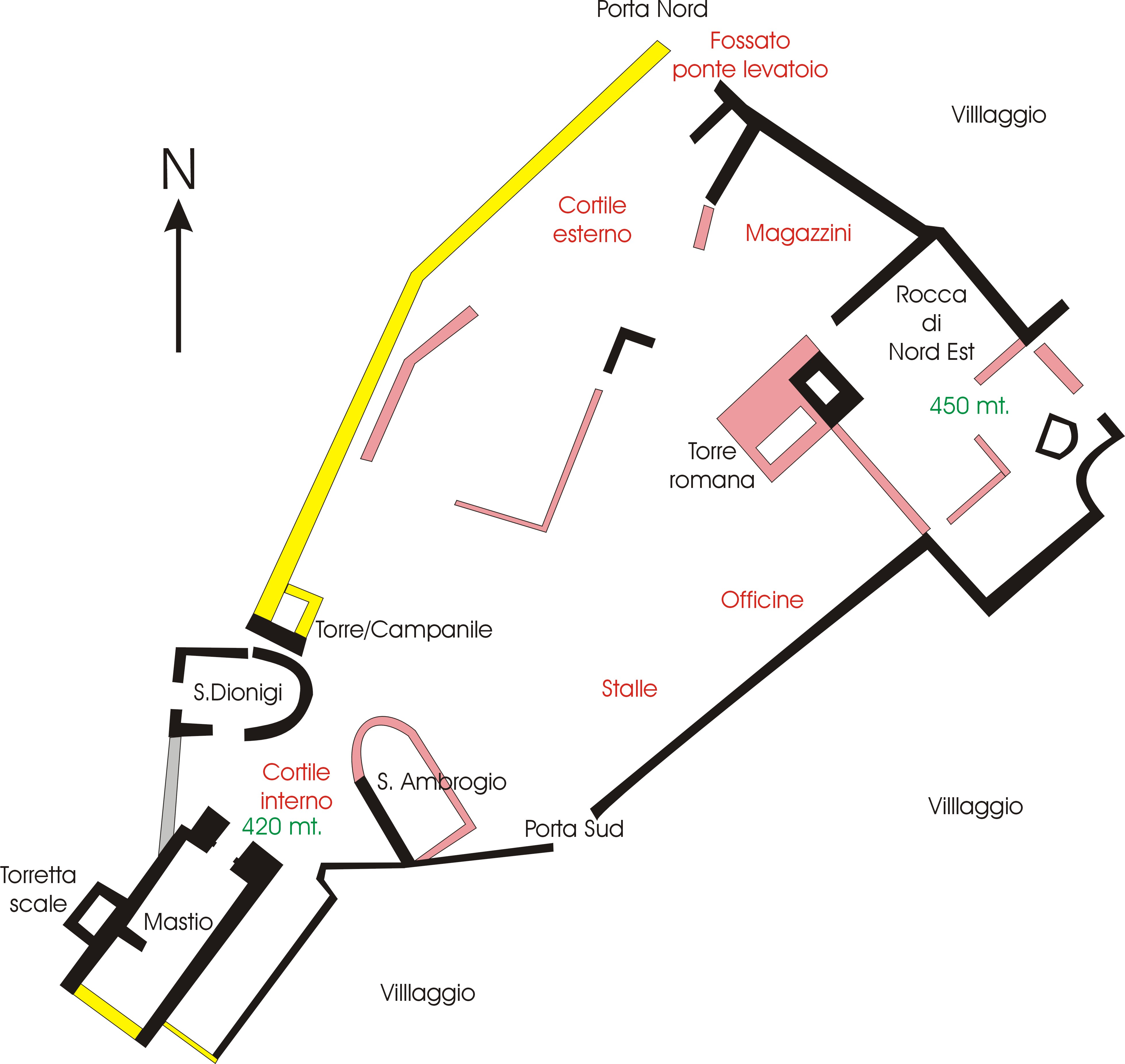
Plan of the castle

Going from north to south, the building stands on an area of 3,500 square metres, with a 400-metre perimeter. Altitudes range from 430 metres above sea level in the dungeon to 455 metres at the north-east fortress. Coming from the south, the dungeon can be seen within a 10 km' distance, although it is located in a scarcely visible position, which is a proof of its strategical importance.

The castle was originally built on four floors, and had an embattled roof; on the western wall leaned a small tower, hosting the stairs that took to each floor. The dungeon looked like a ship's bow; most likely, the now disappeared southern wall had no entrance, but windows only. From that area, the castle could easily control the road beneath, taking strategical advantage of its higher position.

Behind the dungeon, the castle's plan opened in a fan-like manner, showing an angle of 15°; the whole area was a plain court, hosting two buildings: in the western part of the yard there was the church of Saint Denis, the French patron of Paris; on the opposite side another church, dedicated to Saint Ambrose could be probably found, whose ruins cannot be clearly identified.

Saint Denis church had two entrances: the main one was situated on the west side, while the southern access lead to the court. The fact leads us to suppose that the church was the parish of a wooden village, now disappeared, that stood around the bottom of the hill. The west side was also the easiest to defend.

On the south-east wall, slightly northern than Saint Ambrose's church, was situated the main cartway door, whose entrance was probably made easier by a wooden claw, either fixed or moving, depending on the high relief that detached it from the ancient road.

Going north, visitors can find more ruins, whose identification is scarcely possible: most likely, these are the leftovers of shops or storehouses.

The eastern side rises up to 455 metres. The hill-top is entirely covered by the grand north-east fortress. This is the most ancient part of the castle: dating back to Roman times, it was one of the signalling towers that were built all around the Empire and, in medieval times, Lombards made it bigger. From the hill-top one can view all of the southern area of Lake Lugano, which could not be done from the dungeon. The access to the northeast fortress is still difficult, due both to the relief and the thick vegetation that makes the entry almost inaccessible. The dungeon played a very important role during the First World War, when it was included in the well-known Cadorna Line thanks to its outstanding position. The western side stands on the same level as the dungeon, showing another court: protected by a wall, it gives way to the North Door, that surely had a drawbridge.

Between the north-west court and the north-east dungeon, many embankments were built: on their pavements probably rose wooden and stone buildings. Some of these embankments are still visible.

== History ==
Due to the lack of written sources, the history of the castle is still, in some respects, mysterious. The few studies and on-site digs have found out that it was built close to an ancient road that connected Milan to the alpine passages of San Bernardino Pass and Gotthard Pass. Its building on top of a gorge made the fortress impossible to seize. Its closeness to the river Cavallizza, which flows through an area rich in silver, lead and gold, could also suggest that it played a preeminent role in controlling the managing of the mineral wealth of the region.

== Foundation ==
The castle was built in many different stages. The most ancient tower, which dates back to Roman times, was enlarged during the Lombard age. The plan is quite unusual; it can be compared only to Warkworth Castle, in the northern English county of Northumberland, and to another local castle, the Castello di Trecate (NO). We know for sure that the present English castle was built on a pre-existing Saxon settlement, following the previous shape. That is why some believe that the castle of Cuasso was built by a Saxon workforce. Paul the Deacon, in his book Historia Langobardorum, records about 20,000 Saxons, who followed king Alboin in spring 568. The Saxons descended from the same ancestors, as both people had lived in Roman Germany during the first century A.D, in the area around the river Elbe. In 734 a part of 20,000 Arimannia left Italy, as they strongly disagreed with the Lombards' power. So, the Castle was surely a military defence of the road that connected Como and the Gotthard: in fact, before the bridge of Melide was built, the main road ran through it.

Later it was part of the Seprio's County, and it was permanently abandoned in the 13th century. Until the mid 16th century the castle of Cuasso housed the local parish; then, during the following centuries, it was used as a cemetery. Finally, the castle was brought back to its function of observation tower when the Cadorna Line was built.

== Etymology ==
The name Cuasso probably blends two words: covum (cove) and Sachsum-i (Sword-Saxon), following a late form, which replaced the original Latin form Saxo, saxonis; this word is however recorded in ancient German. According to many a research, the Lombardic language belonged to the western Saxon branch, just like the Saxon language.

The Lombards typically used to disperse people around the conquered territory. This dispersion took place according to the family groups, named farae. Then, new villages were built; these villages still survive in Italian toponymy, such as Fara Filiorum Petri, Vidigulfo (Vicus Lodulfi), Mendrisio (Locus Mandrici). This practice, though, promoted the dissolution of the Lombard component within the pre-existing Gaulish-Roman substratum.
