= Company of Death =

Medieval group of warriors within the Milanese and Lombard League's militias

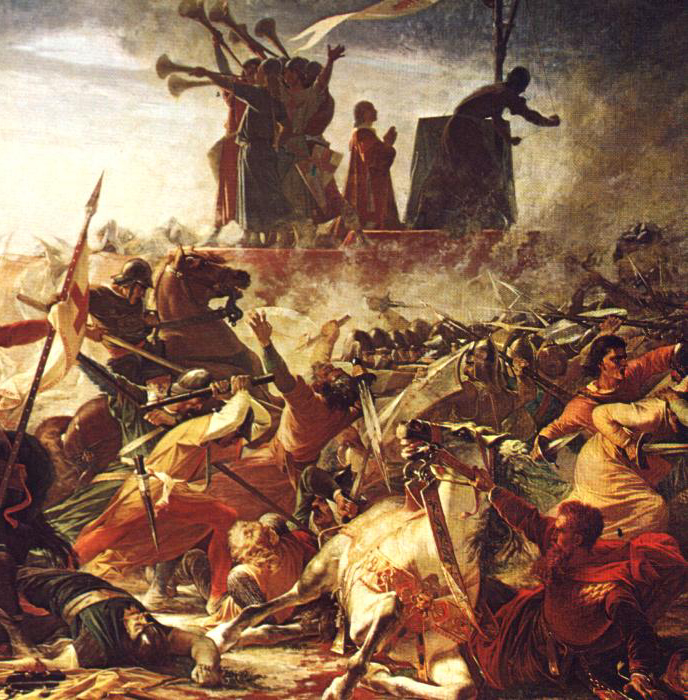
The defence of the Carroccio during the battle of Legnano (1176) by Amos Cassioli (1832–1891)

The Company of Death (Italian: Compagnia della Morte) is the name historically used for two related bands of warriors entrusted to guarantee the cohesiveness and efficiency in battle of both the Milanese and Lombard League's militias through their bond by oath (Note: "Determined to fight to the last gasp, sworn to die then lose it (the Carroccio) and accept defeat".) to the defence of the Milanese Carroccio, (Note: A "Sacred car(t)", symbol and sign of municipal freedom and of right who was used as rallying point and centre of command in battle.) the wagon on which the standard (Note: The altar, the standard and the Holy Bell (known as Martinella).) of the Lombard allies stood.

They fought in the Battle of Legnano (29 May 1176) against the imperial army of Frederick I Barbarossa, Emperor of the Holy Roman Empire, in his 5th Italian Campaign, and were determinant in his decisive defeat.

The two corps who formed the Company of Death were the Company of the Carroccio, an infantry unit of 300 men, and the Knights of Death, a cavalry unit of 900 men, commanded according to tradition by Alberto da Giussano. One historical study argues that Alberto da Giussano and the Knights of Death never existed.

== The Chronicles ==
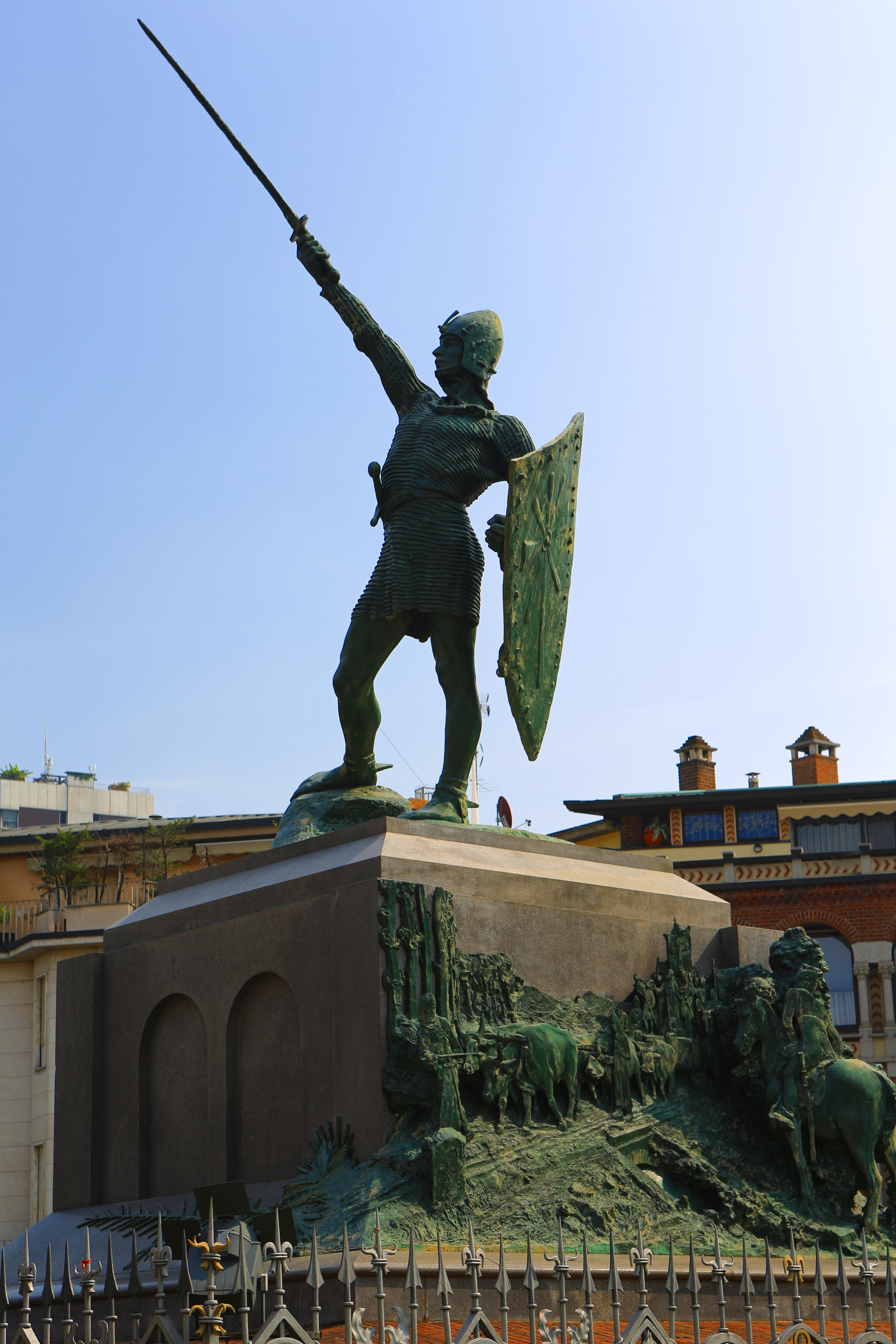
Il Monument to the Warrior of Legnano, often mistakenly associated with Alberto da Giussano

According to a legend reported for the first time by the 14th century chronicler Galvano Fiamma, who wrote 150 years after the battle of Legnano, the Knights of the Death were formed by 900 knights. It owed its name to the oath that its members made, which included fighting until their last breath without ever lowering their arms. According to Galvano Fiamma, the Knights of the Death defended the Carroccio to the extreme and then carried out, in the final stages of the battle of Legnano, a charge against Frederick Barbarossa's imperial army.

From an excerpt from the Chronica Galvanica by Galvano Fiamma we can read:

[...] Upon hearing of the emperor's arrival, the Milanese ordered them to prepare their weapons in order to resist. And a society of nine hundred elected men was fought who fought on great horses who swear that no one would escape from the battlefield for fear of death and would not allow anyone to betray the Milan municipality; and also swore that they would take to the field to fight against the emperor every day. At that point the community chose the weapons and the banner and each was given a ring in his hand; and were recruited as knights in the pay of the municipality so that, if someone had fled, he would have been killed. Head of this company was Alberto da Giussano who had the banner of the municipality. Then another company of infantrymen was chosen for the custody of the carroccio, who all swore to prefer to die than to escape from the battlefield. And three hundred triangular-shaped ships are made and under each one there were six horses covered, so as not to be seen, that dragged the ships. In each ship there were ten men who moved sickles to cut the grass of the meadows as the sailors move the oars: it was a terrible construction against the enemies [...]

— Galvano Fiamma, Chronica Galvanica

While, on another excerpt of the same work, this time on the battle of Legnano, we can read that:

[...] In the year 1176, regardless of the betrayals and contravening the oath, the emperor wanted the destruction of the city of Milan. After leaving the city of Pavia, enter our territory and reach the village of Carate. Only the Pavesi and the Comaschi were with him among all the Italics. The Chronicle of Leo tells that it arrives between Legnano and Dairago. It was the third day before the calends of June, the day of the feast of the holy martyrs Sisinno, Alessandro and Martirio. Alberto da Giussano had the banner of the community and with him there were two brothers, very strong giants, namely Ottone and Rainero, who carried the banner for their brother: they were always companions on the right and on the left. When the battle began, three doves were seen rising from the altar of the aforementioned three martyrs and resting on the carroccio tree. Realizing this, the emperor fled in terror. Since then, that day became a solemn celebration. The emperor put to flight, the citizens of Milan were greatly enriched with the spoils of war of the Germans. Upon learning of the defeat of the emperor, Pope Alexander greatly rejoiced and wrote many exhortation letters in Milan, because he was more inclined to die than to leave the city of Milan [...]

— Galvano Fiamma, Chronica Galvanica

The mention of the "battle wagons" is very probably an anachronism, they were employed, without any success, years before the Battle of Legnano of 1176 took place, by a Mastro Guitelmo a milanese Guild-master and magistrate in a previous battle fought in the lands between Rho and Legnano in 1160 AD. It is possible that the chronicler was mixing facts as their effective use at Legnano isn't mentioned elsewhere, it may also be a rhetorical device intended by him to recreate the appearance of the traditional trinitarian model of a "Holy Venture".

The reports of Fiamma should be taken, however, with the benefit of the doubt since in his writings there are inaccuracies, errors and legendary facts.

== The Company of Death ==
=== The Company of the Carroccio ===
The Company of the Carroccio was an infantry unit of 300 men, all of them young volunteers (forming a societas) and Milanese, sworn by oath to die in defence of the Milanese Carroccio. They fought as phalanx in a Sheltron formation around their "Sacred wagon", armed with a large shield and a lanzalonga.

=== The Knights of Death ===
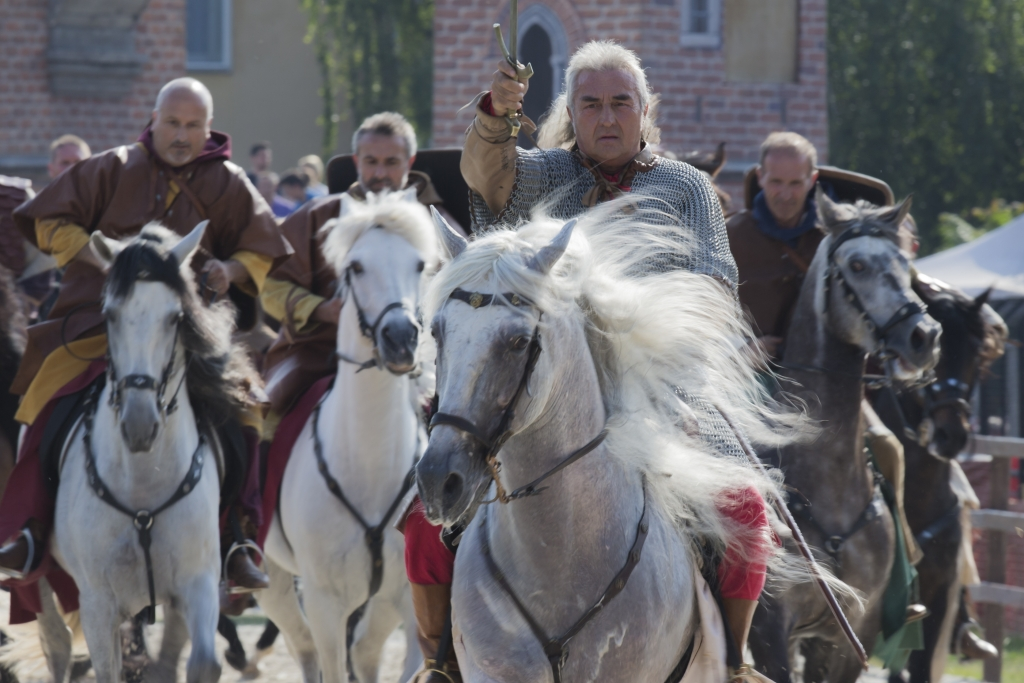
Folkloristic reconstruction of the Knights of Death led by Alberto da Giussano who is preparing to carry out the charge during the battle of Legnano at the Palio di Legnano 2014

The Knights of Death is the name of a temporary military association of medieval knights (a temporary societas), not historically documented, which according to tradition was organized and equipped by a leader known as Alberto da Giussano. It had a great importance during the Battle of Legnano (29 May 1176) where it defended the Carroccio of the Lombard League against the imperial army of Frederick I Barbarossa.

The company was assembled in haste, depriving the Lombard infantry of the valuable support of enough heavy cavalry, "horse" were recruited by Alberto da Giussano around Brescia, and in other eastern areas of Lombardy that had contributed less in infantry and trails to the League. The knights would not be understood in the medieval and romantic sense, but as mere "mounted on horseback" or also "light cavalry". They were very probably particularly cruel and fierce "professional, or semi-professional, fighters", apt at wreaking havoc in the enemy ranks.

According to Milanese chronicler Galvano Fiamma it was composed of 900 men at arms but other sources and modern scholars reduce that number to 300 or, more probably, 500. According to tradition they wore a sort of dark suit (black and gray, cut vertically) connected at the sides, to cover the armour, with probably the symbol of the skull on the traditional small pointed wooden shields.

Historical studies done over time have shown that Alberto da Giussano and the Knights of Death never existed.

== Commemorations ==
Figures playing Alberto da Giussano and members of the Knights of Death participate in the historic parade of the Palio di Legnano. Later, these figures, at the city stadium, before the horse race, repropose the position that, according to legend, was made by Alberto da Giussano and the Knights of Death in the final stages of the battle of Legnano.

== See also ==
- Alberto da Giussano
- Battle of Legnano
- Lombard League
- Church of the Compagnia della morte

== Bibliography ==
- Agnoletto, Attilo (1992). San Giorgio su Legnano – storia, società, ambiente (in Italian). SBN IT\ICCU\CFI\0249761.
- Chronicon Vincentii Canonici Pragensis in Monumenta historica Boemiae by Fr. Gelasius Dobner (1764)
- D'Ilario, Giorgio; Gianazza, Egidio; Marinoni, Augusto; Turri, Marco (1984). Profilo storico della città di Legnano (in Italian). Edizioni Landoni. SBN IT\ICCU\RAV\0221175.
- D'Ilario, Giorgio; Gianazza, Egidio; Marinoni, Augusto (1976). Legnano e la battaglia (in Italian). Edizioni Landoni. SBN IT\ICCU\LO1\1256757.
- I. R. Dieterich, "Die Taktik in den Lombardenkriegen der Staufer", Marburg, 1892
- Gianazza, Egidio (1975). La battaglia di Legnano (in Italian). Atesa. SBN IT\ICCU\PUV\1179200.
- Grillo, Paolo (2010). Legnano 1176. Una battaglia per la libertà (in Italian). Laterza. ISBN 978-88-420-9243-8.
- Alberto Peruffo, Alberto da Giussano tra realtà e mito
- Federico A. Rossi Di Marignano: "Federico Barbarossa e Beatrice di Borgogna. Re e regina d'Italia", Mondadori, 2009, ISBN 978-88-04-58676-0
