= Church of the Compagnia della morte =

Chiesa della Compagnia della Morte
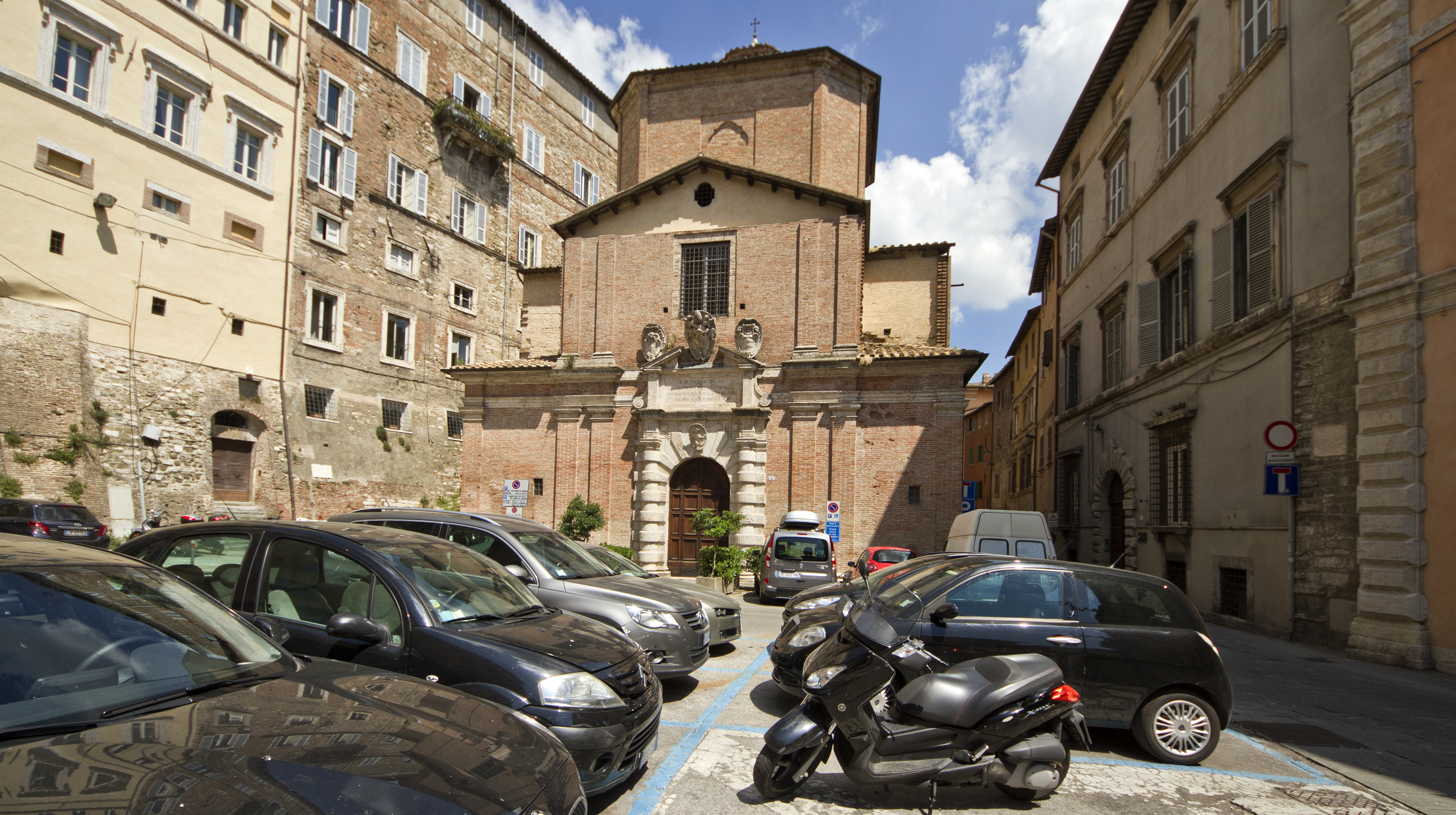
- Chiesa della Compagnia della Morte
- 43°06′46″N 12°23′27″E
- Location: Perugia
- Country: Italy
- Religious institute: Catholicism

Architecture
- Architect(s): Bino Sozi, Vincenzo Danti
- Years built: Started on 18 June 1575

Administration
- Archdiocese: Perugia

The Church of the Compagnia della Morte or Church of the Compagnia dell'Orazione e della Buona Morte is a church in the center of the Italian city of Perugia. It is located in Piazza Piccinino (number 3), a few steps from the Cathedral, in the district of Porta Sole.

== History ==
The Compagnia della Buona Morte was founded in 1570 to give worthy burial to destitute people and bodies found in public streets and promoted the construction of the church since 1575. The works, made by Bino Sozi and planned by Vincenzo Danti, ended beyond 1600.

The church was restored in 2005.

== Description ==
The church has a Greek-cross plan, with a dome overlapped to a high lantern. The portal, of mannerist style, dates back to 1606. The papal legate, cardinal Bonifacio Bevilacqua (who joined the brotherhood in 1601), ordered the imposing portal (1604) and he is reminded in the inscription above. The weapons here are those of Pope Clement VIII, the cardinal Bevilacqua and the vice-legate Alessandro Maggi, with the griffin of Perugia under the inscription, it's surmounted with a trabeation that recalls the doric decoration of the Arco Etrusco: a frieze composed by metope with round shields the clipei and triglyphs.

The inside of the church has a square plan with a rectangular tribune and two rectangular lateral chapels. Above the entrance there is a balaustrade choir. The organ (1897) was built by Nicolò and Francesco Morettini. Renovated in the XVIII century keeps paintings and stuccoes of Francesco Busti, Cristoforo Gasperi and Anton Maria Garbi (XVIII century). On the main altar stands a painting of Vincenzo Pellegrini representing "Ognisanti" – All Saints (1612) inserted in a golden and carved architectural frame.

== See also ==
- Company of Death
