= Carroccio =

Large chariot used in medieval battles

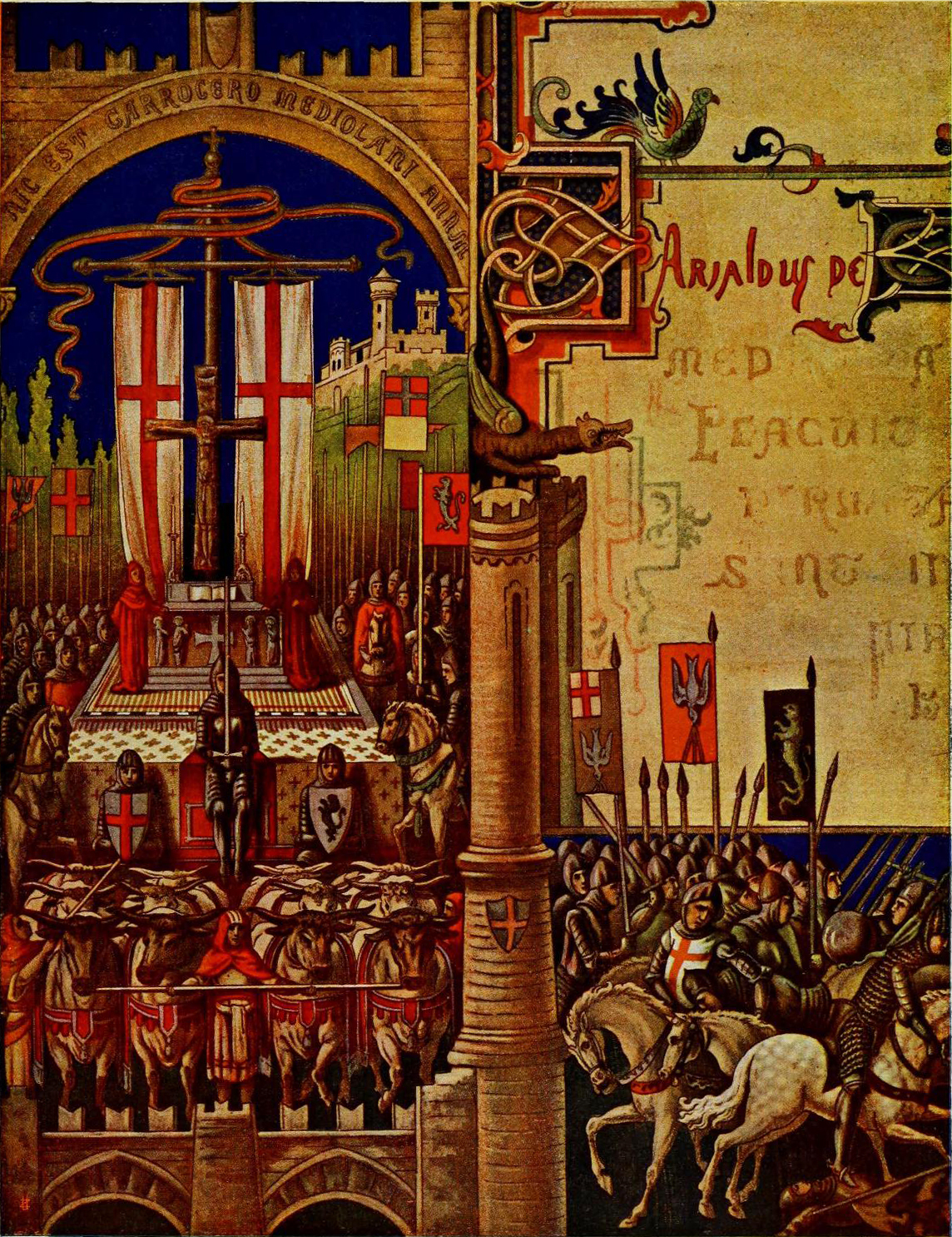
The carroccio of Milan on an ancient miniature

A carroccio (Italian: [karˈrɔttʃo]; Lombard: carrocc [kaˈrɔtʃ]) was a large four-wheeled wagon bearing the city signs around which the militia of the medieval communes gathered and fought. It was particularly common among the Lombard, Tuscan and, more generally, northern Italian municipalities. Later its use spread even outside Italy. It was the symbol of municipal autonomy. Priests celebrated Mass at the altar before the battle, and the trumpeters beside them encouraged the fighters to the fray.

Defended by selected troops, paved with the colors of the municipality, it was generally pulled by oxen and carried an altar, a bell (called martinella), the heraldic signs of the city and a mast surmounted by a Christian cross. In peace time it was kept in the main church of the city to which it belonged.

In battle the carroccio was surrounded by the bravest warriors in the army as the carroccio guard, and it served both as a rallying point and as the palladium of the city's honour; its capture by the enemy was regarded as an irretrievable defeat and humiliation.

== History ==
=== Origins ===
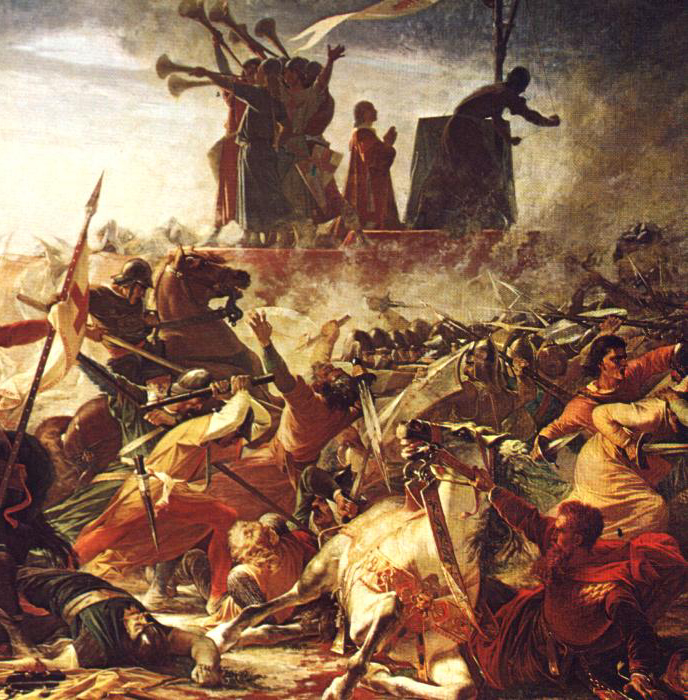
The carroccio of Legnano, a history painting by Amos Cassioli (1832–1891)

The carroccio, which has Lombard origins, was initially used by Arimannia as a war chariot. Its function became purely symbolic, with the addition of the cross, of the city signs, of the altar and with its preservation in the main church of the city between 1037 and 1039 due to the Archbishop of Milan Aribert's use in one of the sieges that Conrad II, Holy Roman Emperor did on several occasions in Milan. The carroccio therefore, from a military means, became a purely political instrument. From Milan its use spread in many municipalities of northern Italy, in Tuscany and outside Italy, until the decline in the 14th century. Medieval documents show the carroccio called carochium, carozulum, carrocerum or carrocelum, while in the Milanese dialect of the time it was probably called caròcc or caròz. The carroccio was introduced by Heribert (Ariberto) for use as the military insignia of Milan. His many supporters adopted and spread the use of the insignia. It was soon adopted in Lombardy, Tuscany and Rome where it signified a militia aligned toward a defence of the Church.

Its diffusion extended to other Lombard cities, but this cannot be explained as a pure reproduction of the Milanese carroccio. Moreover, the descendants of the Arimannia, still at the turn of the 11th and 12th centuries had maintained, in the medieval society of northern Italy, a certain autonomy and were recognizable for various specific prerogatives, although the Lombard domination had ended after a few centuries.

=== 12th century ===
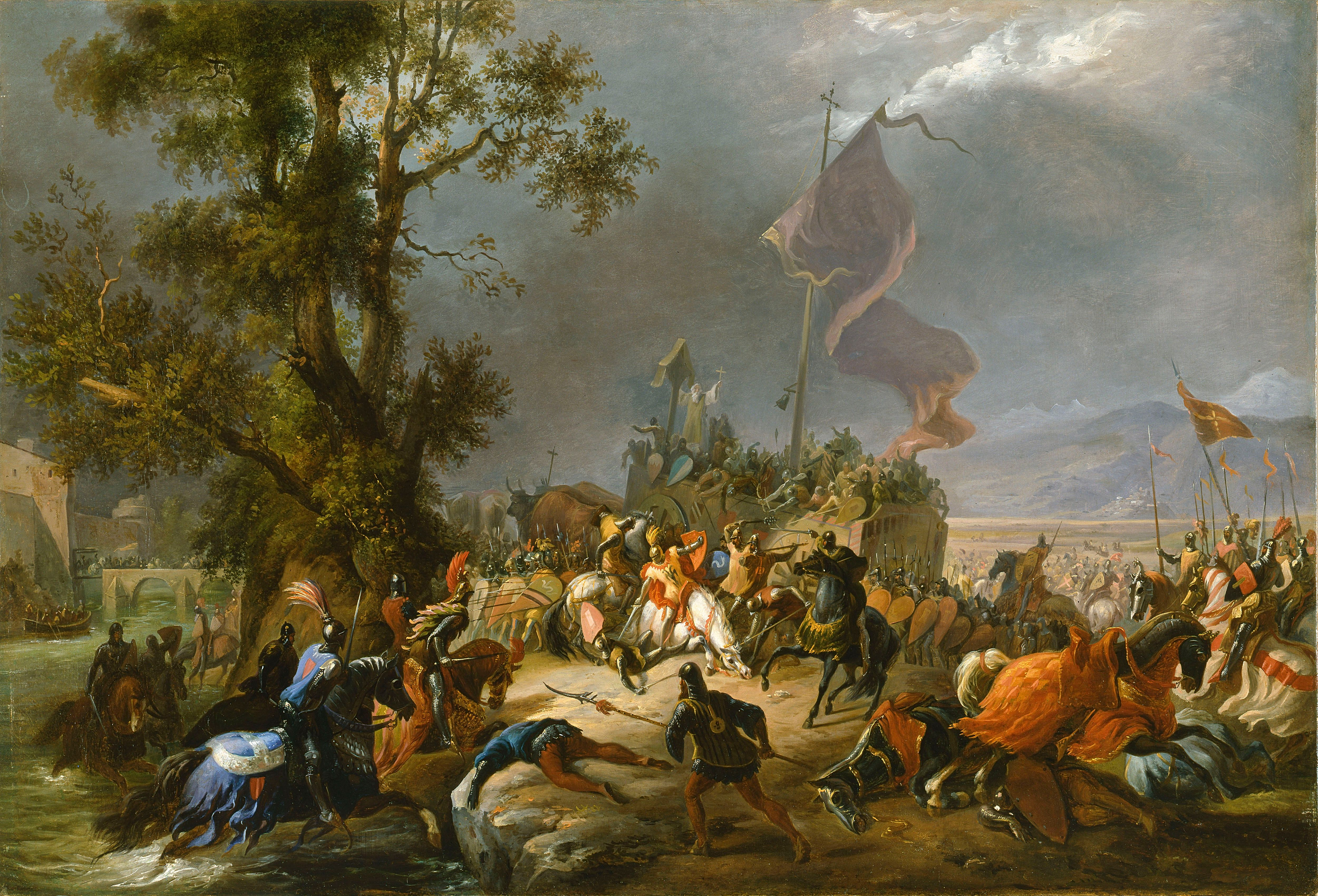
The Battle of Legnano by Massimo d'Azeglio, 1831. In the background, the cross and the city signs are positioned on the carroccio.

Documents of 1158 and 1201 confirm the presence of the Milanese carroccio, in peacetime, in the church of San Giorgio al Palazzo, while others are still inside the Palazzo della Ragione. The first document cited contains information on the need to make an iron shield to be placed in the choir of the church, which was located near the carroccio, with the lighting of a votive fire fed by a pound of oil. The 1201 document contains similar information in that the archbishop of the San Giorgio al Palazzo church in Milan should have lighted votive lamps around the carroccio.

In 1159 the municipal troops of Brescia conquered the carroccio of the Cremona area during a battle. The cart was then carried in triumph between the streets of Brescia and was placed in the community church, with the "martinella" which was positioned on the civic tower of the city.

The carroccio was the protagonist in the battle of Legnano on 29 May 1176, during which it was defended, according to legend, by the Company of Death led by Alberto da Giussano, a fictional character who actually appeared only in literary works of the following century. According to the legend, during the fight, three doves, out of the burials of the saints Sisinnio, Martirio and Alessandro at the basilica of San Simpliciano in Milan, rested on the carroccio causing the flight of Frederick Barbarossa.

Instead, according to the real historical facts, the municipal infantry arranged a decisive resistance around the carroccio which allowed the remaining part of the Lombard League army led by Guido da Landriano, to arrive from Milan and defeat Frederick Barbarossa in the famous clash of Legnano. Today it is difficult to establish precisely the exact location of this carroccio to the current topography of Legnano. One of the chronicles of the clash, the Cologne Annals, contain important information:

The Lombards, ready to win or die on the field, placed their army inside a large pit, so that when the battle was in full swing, no one could escape. (Note: I lombardi, pronti a vincere o a morire sul campo, collocarono il proprio esercito all'interno di una grande fossa, in modo tale che quando la battaglia fosse stata nel vivo, nessuno sarebbe potuto fuggire.)

— Annals of Cologne

This would suggest that the carroccio was located on the edge of a steep slope flanking the river Olona, so that the imperial cavalry, whose arrival was planned by Castellanza along the river, would have been forced to attack the centre of the army of the Lombard League going up the escarpment. This decision later proved to be strategically incorrect, given that Frederick Barbarossa came instead from Borsano, or from the opposite side, which forced the municipal troops to resist around the carroccio with the escape road blocked by the Olona.

Considering the evolution of the clash, this could mean that the crucial phases in defence of the carroccio had been fought on the territory of the San Martino contrada (more precisely, near the 15th-century church of the same name, which in fact dominates a slope that descends towards the Olona) or of the Legnanese quarter of "Costa di San Giorgio", since in another part of the neighbouring areas it is not possible to identify another depression with the characteristics suitable for its defence. Considering the last hypothesis, the final clash could also have taken place on part of the territory now belonging to the contrade of Sant'Ambrogio and San Magno (between the quartier of "Costa di San Giorgio" and the Olona, a steep slope was later included in the Castello park) and to the municipality of San Giorgio su Legnano.

=== 13th century ===
The carroccio was afterwards adopted by other cities and first appears, after Legnano, on a Florentine battlefield in 1228. The Florentine carroccio was usually followed by a smaller cart bearing the "martinella", a bell to ring out military signals. When war was regarded as likely, the "martinell" was attached to the door of the Church of Santa Maria in the Mercato Nuovo in Florence and rung to warn both citizens and enemies. In times of peace, the carroccio was in the keeping of a great family which had distinguished itself by signal services to the republic. The Florentine carroccio was captured by the Ghibelline forces of Castruccio Castracani in the 1325 Battle of Altopascio, after which it was displayed by the victors in a triumph held in the streets of Lucca.

The carro della guerra of Milan was described in detail in 1288 by Bonvesin de la Riva in his book on the "Marvels of Milan". Wrapped in scarlet cloth and drawn by three yoke of oxen that were caparisoned in the white with the red crosses of Saint George, the city's patron, it carried a crucifix so massive it took four men to put it in place, like a ship's mast.

The carroccio of the Lombard League was captured by the imperials in 1237 during the battle of Cortenuova, donated to Pope Gregory IX by the emperor Frederick II, Holy Roman Emperor, and transported to the Palazzo Senatorio in Rome in what is still called the Sala del carroccio ("Room of carroccio"), where the commemorative inscription of the gift is kept made by the emperor to the Roman people. The inscription reads:

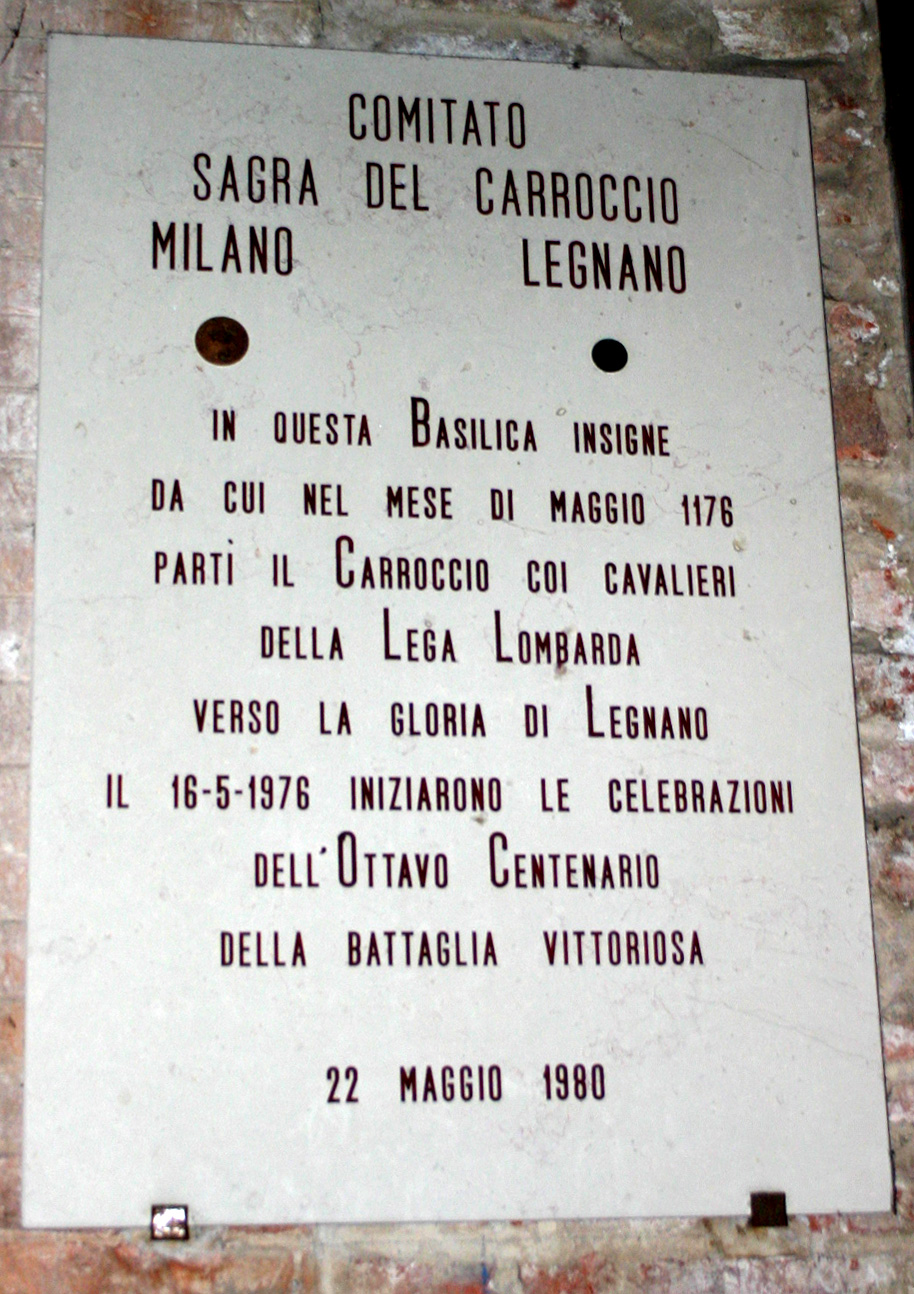
Plaque commemorates the departure of the carroccio in San Simpliciano church towards Legnano just before the homonymous battle.

Receive, oh Rome, the chariot, a gift of Emperor Frederick II, perennial honor of the city. Captured in the defeat of Milan, it comes as a glorious prey to announce the triumphs of Caesar. It will be held as shame to the enemy, sent here for the glory of the City, the love of Rome sent it (Note: Ricevi, o Roma, il carro, dono dell'imperatore Federico II, onore perenne della città. Catturato nella sconfitta di Milano, viene come preda gloriosa ad annunciare i trionfi di Cesare. Sarà tenuto come vergogna del nemico, è qui inviato per la gloria dell'Urbe, lo fece inviare l'amore di Roma. [...])

Rome, in addition to being the seat of the papacy, was also the capital of a vast empire, and therefore the sending of the carroccio to the city by the emperor had a strong symbolic meaning. In 1237 however, the Lega Lombarda lost the carroccio in battle because of the muddy roads.

In 1275, it was the carroccio of the Bolognese (who were Guelphs) to be captured in the battle of San Procolo by the Forlivese, who were instead Ghibellines, and to be brought in triumph to Forlì. In the mid-13th century the carroccio di Cremona was instead captured in battle by the municipal militias of Parma.

Accounts of the carroccio will be found in most histories of the Italian republics.

=== 14th century: decline and disappearance ===
The decline of the carroccio occurred due to the evolution of war tactics. When larger and more manoeuvrable armies began to appear, the municipal infantry were replaced by soldiers of "ventura", who, being mercenaries, lacked emotional ties and belonging to the city.

The symbolic value of the carroccio, in this historical context, was therefore less. Moreover, from a logistical point of view, the carroccio, being a very slow vehicle drawn by oxen, was not very mobile, and often created obstacles to the actions of war, which were becoming faster and faster. For these reasons, the carroccio, in the 14th century, went inexorably towards a phase of decline which then led to its disappearance from battlefields.

=== The use of the carroccio outside Italy ===
Similar cart-mounted standards were also found elsewhere in Europe, at the Battle of the Standard in 1138, employed by the English, and at the Battle of Sirmium in 1167, employed by the Hungarians.

== Function ==
In addition to the symbolic value, the carroccio had an important military tactical function. It began to gain military value, especially after the battle of Legnano, where, between the first times in history, the infantry, which was gathered around the carroccio, held the chivalry head. Until then, the latter was in fact considered clearly superior to soldiers on foot.

Since the infantry gathered around the carroccio, the latter, besides having a strong symbolic value, therefore had an important tactical function. If the carroccio was ever captured, for the municipal militias, defeat was almost certain. Also, for this reason, the carroccio, in addition to being considered the most coveted in war, was kept in cathedrals, which were the most important churches of the municipalities, and was the protagonist, always in times of peace, of the most important ceremonies and events that took place in the cities.

In addition to the war purpose, the carroccio had other functions, which could also be carried out in times of peace. The leaders of the municipalities, on the carroccio, could make important decisions concerning the city, while the judges could use it as a mobile tribunal to issue their sentences.

The Lombard Lega infantry, during the battle of Legnano, managed to resist the various attacks perpetrated by the imperial cavalry due to the tactics of the latter, which foresaw assaults on small disorganized groups. Only after the clash of Legnano did the cavalry begin to change strategy, attacking the infantry in defence of the carroccio in conspicuous organized forces, thus succeeding in breaking its resistance. This change in war strategy also contributed to the decline and disappearance of the carroccio from battlefields.

=== In the chronicles ===
Since there are very few surviving remains from medieval times, information on the shape of the carroccio is fragmentary. Alessandro Visconti, in a book from 1945, referring to the chronicler Arnulf of Milan, reports this description:

The sign that was to precede the fighters was like this: a tall antenna, like a ship's mast, planted in a sturdy wagon rose up high, bringing to the top a golden knob with two flaps of white hanging linen. In the midst of that antenna the venerable Cross was fixed with the image of the Redeemer painted with open arms facing the surrounding ranks, because whatever the event of the war, looking at that sign, the soldiers comforted it… (Note: L'insegna che doveva precedere i combattenti era fatta così: un'alta antenna, a guisa d'un albero di nave, piantata in un robusto carro s'ergeva in alto portando alla cima un aureo pomo con due lembi di candido lino pendenti. In mezzo a quell'antenna stava infissa la veneranda Croce con dipinta l'immagine del Redentore a braccia aperte rivolte alle schiere circostanti, perché qualunque fosse l'evento della guerra, guardando quell'insegna, i soldati ne avessero conforto.)

— Alessandro Visconti, History of Milan, 1945, p. 169

Two depictions of the carroccio in the Middle Ages reached the 21st-century ichnographically. The first is present in the Montauri Chronicles of Siena, and the second in the Chronicle of Giovanni Villani.

The flagpole, according to the description of Bonvesin da la Riva, weighed as much as four men and was usually supported by ropes (certainly that of Milan). In the Chigi codex, the Florentine carroccio presents two flagpoles and the flag, which very often was not fixed to a sidebar, was in precious fabric usually divided into two halved colours, or it was decorated with a cross motif. Unlike in Northern Europe, the representation of the patron saint did not appear on Italian wagons, where it was often depicted as decoration of the front body.

=== The "martinella" ===
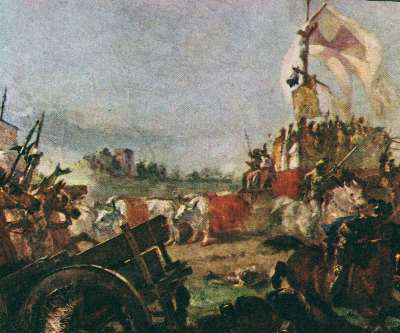
On the right, the carroccio during the battle of Legnano on a painting by Amos Cassioli

The use of the bell (the "martinella") is still controversial. It is not clear whether he was directly on the carroccio or else he followed on another vehicle. The function of recall of the soldiers around the carroccio was carried out by the "martinella", while the trumpeters imparted the orders and, very often, incited the troop to the combat.

In 2000, the original "martinella" of the Battle of Legnano was identified. It was kept on the bell tower of the hermitage of Sant'Alberto di Butrio of Ponte Nizza, in the province of Pavia. In the same year of the discovery, it was paraded during the historical procession of the Palio di Legnano.

=== The specialis magister ===
The specialis magister, who took care of the maintenance of the carroccio, was paid by the municipality, for his service, 8 soldi a day. In addition to checking the functionality of the wagon, the specialis magister participated in the war actions in which the carroccio was involved by dressing armor and carrying a sword.

On the carroccio, a chaplain was also present, whose function was to celebrate Mass on the altar placed on the carroccio. Also this religious figure, together with that of the cleric, was paid by the municipality.

== In literature ==
The first literary trace of the carroccio appears in the poem by Raimbaut de Vaqueiras, a French troubadour of the 12th century, entitled "Il Carros", where the man of letters, turning his flattery to Beatrice, daughter of Boniface I, Marquess of Montferrat, states that the Lombard women rivals in the beauty of the girl they use a carroccio and other chariots to "fight" the growing fame of the girl.
