= Tiepolo (disambiguation) =

Tiepolo is a surname. Notable people with the surname include:

Members of the Venetian patrician Tiepolo family

- Jacopo Tiepolo, Doge between 1229–1249
- Lorenzo Tiepolo, Doge between 1268–1275
- Bajamonte Tiepolo (died after 1329), Venetian nobleman and conspirator
- Giovanni Tiepolo, Patriarch of Venice 1619–1631
- Maria Elena Tiepolo Oggioni, Countess tried for murder

Artists

- Giovanni Battista Tiepolo (1696–1770), Venetian painter, often referred to solely as Tiepolo
- Giovanni Domenico Tiepolo (1727–1804), son of Giovanni Battista
- Lorenzo Baldissera Tiepolo (1736–1776), son of Giovanni Battista and younger brother of Giovanni Domenico
