= Monte Canto =

Mountain in Italy

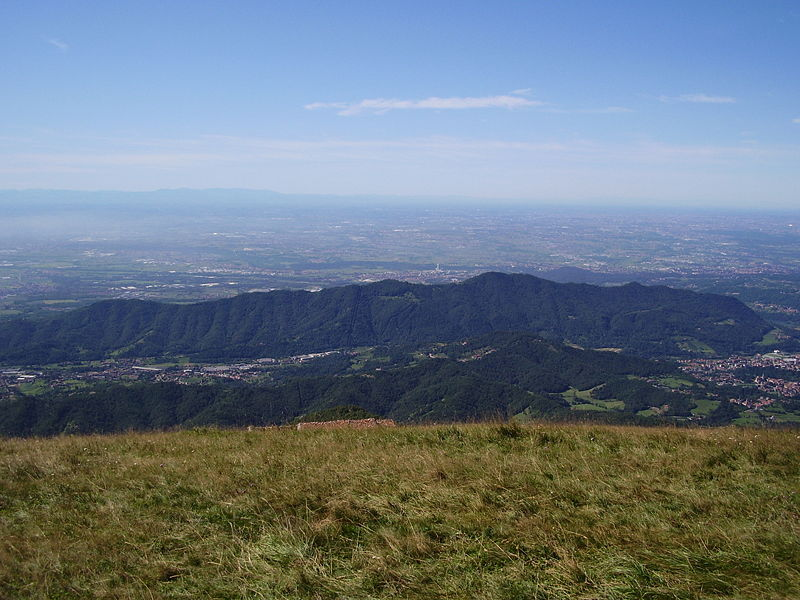

Highest point
- Elevation: 710 m (2,330 ft)
- Coordinates: 45°43′20″N 9°29′14″E

Geography
- Location within Italy
- Location: Lombardy, Italy
- Parent range: Bergamasque Prealps

Monte Canto is a mountain of Lombardy, Italy. It has an elevation of 710 metres. Mountain hiking and mountain biking are popular uses; the easiest climb is on the north side, from Pontida.

== See also ==
- Conservation in Italy
