= Oath of Pontida =

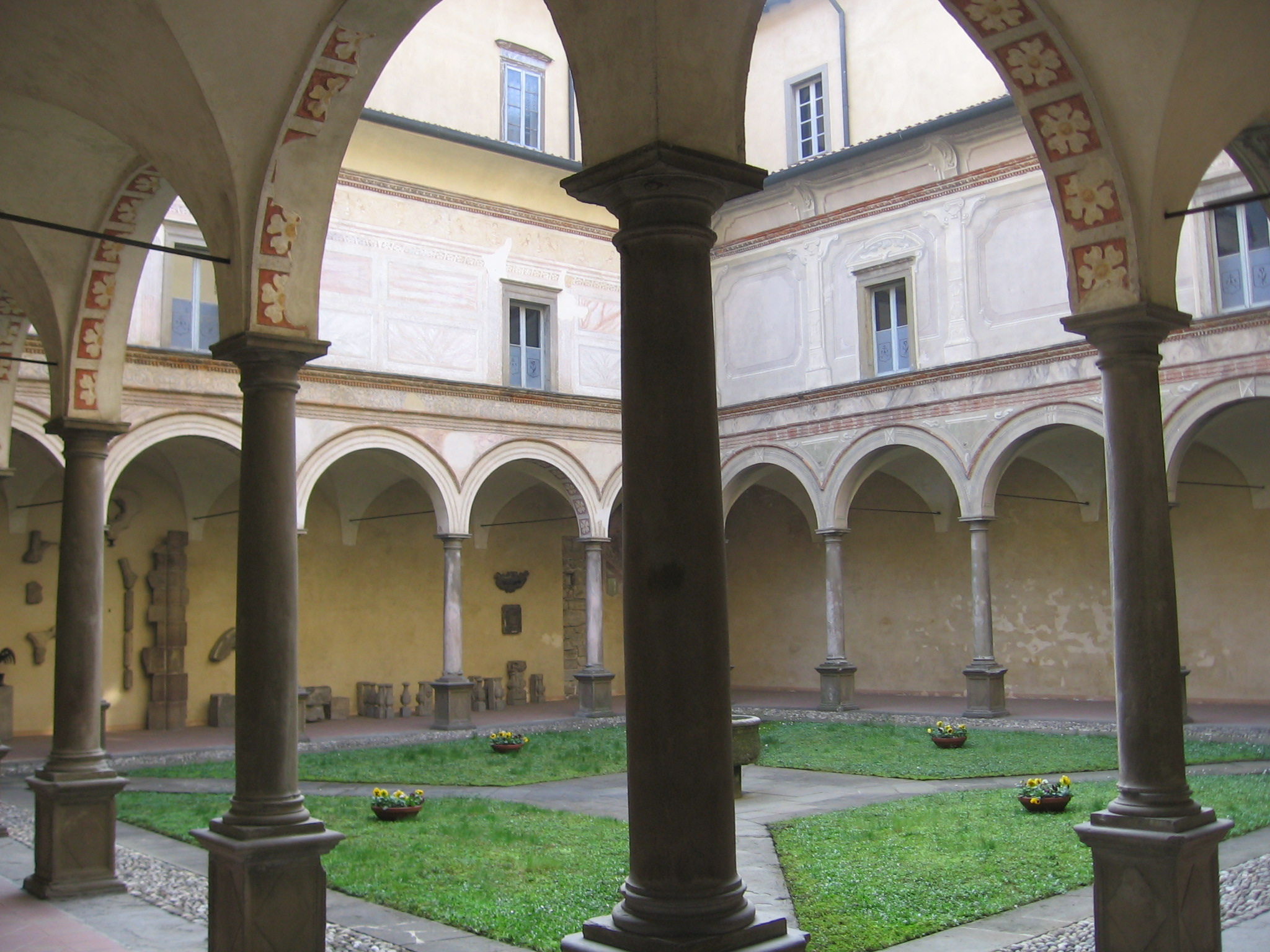
The cloister of the abbey of Pontida. The monastic complex, which is dedicated to James the Great, is the place where, according to tradition, the oath of Pontida would have been celebrated

The oath of Pontida (Giurament de Pontida in Lombard, Giuramento di Pontida in Italian), according to tradition, would have been a ceremony that would have sanctioned on 7 April 1167, in the abbey of Pontida, near Bergamo, in Italy, the birth of the Lombard League, or of a military alliance between the municipalities of Milan, Lodi, Ferrara, Piacenza and Parma aimed at the armed struggle against the Holy Roman Empire by Frederick Barbarossa.

The oath of Pontida does not appear on contemporary documents, being mentioned for the first time in 1505, then three and a half centuries after the traditional date of 7 April 1167.

== History ==
=== Contemporary sources ===
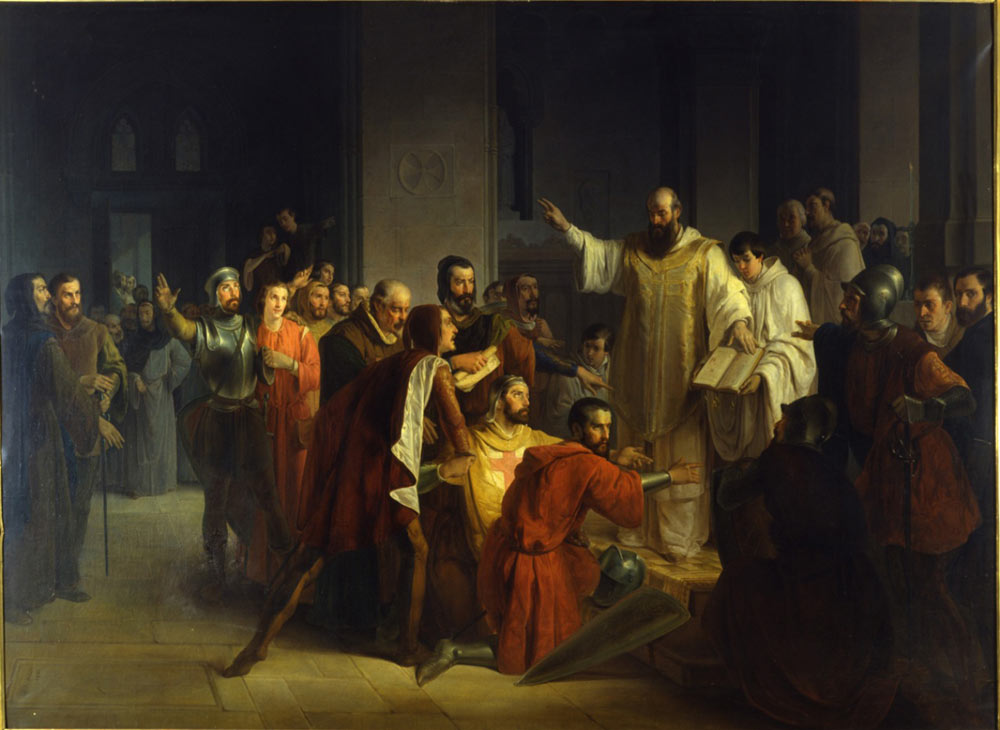
The oath of Pontida in a 1851 painting by Giuseppe Mazza

The event is questioned by historians, given that in the contemporary chronicles written between 1152 and 1189, no Pontida oath is cited. Its first mention is in fact late, since it appears on a document dated 1505.

However, contemporary sources cite the fact that the municipalities of the Lombard League had signed pacts to counter Barbarossa's hegemony by helping each other. Most of these writings, however, argue the event in a rather vague way, without describing the details: neither the locations nor the precise dates of the signing of the pacts are mentioned. On the Piacentina chronicle, regarding the agreement reached for the rebuilding of Milan, we can read:

[...] Anno Domini 1167. All the cities of Lombardy and the March, except Pavia, agreed to rebuild Milan, which was destroyed by the emperor Frederick. [...]

— Piacentina chronicle

The most precise contemporary historical sources tell of at least three oaths among the municipalities of the Lombard League: the first, signed between the end of February and the beginning of March 1167 between Bergamo, Brescia, Cremona and Mantua and known as the "Bergamo oath "; the second, also signed by Milan in March 1167, which joined the four cities in the just mentioned oath; the third, also signed by Lodi in May of the same year, which became part of the previously mentioned coalition, formed by Bergamo, Brescia, Cremona, Mantua and Milan.

Considering the date of 7 April 1167, we can therefore state that the oath of Pontida, even if it was actually signed, was not the constitution of the Lombard League, since at least two previous oaths are cited on historical documents.

=== The following documents ===
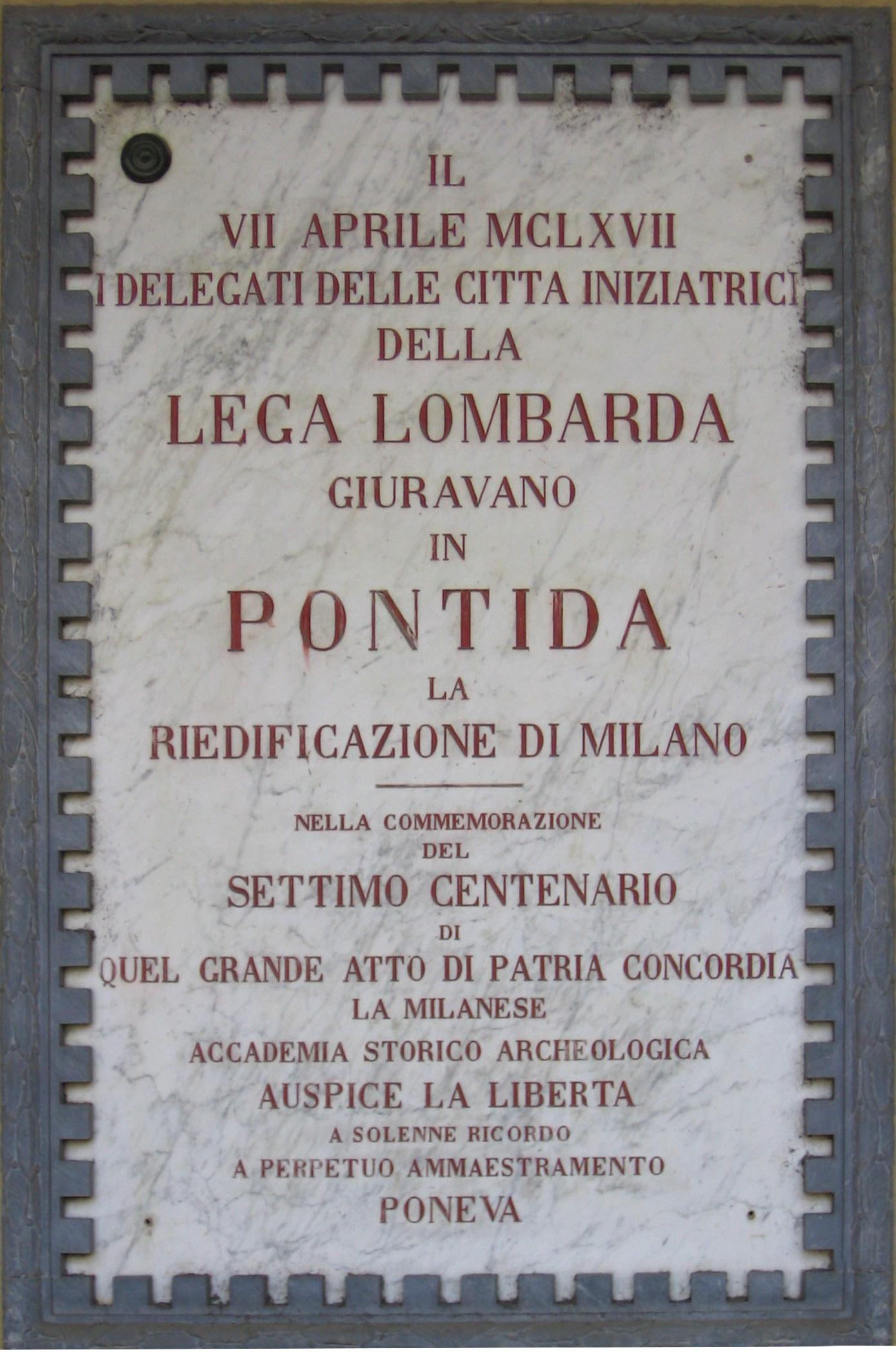
Commemorative plaque to the oath, located in Pontida

In addition to the chronological aspect, which would seem to demonstrate the non-existence of the oath of Pontida as a constitutive pact of the Lombard League due to the two agreements signed before 7 April 1167, the first mention of the incident must certainly also be considered which is quite posterior.

In particular, the oath of Pontida appears for the first time on a document dated 1505 by Bernardino Corio - therefore about 350 years after the canonical date of 7 April 1167 - which is called Historia Patria and which has as its subject the history of Milan.

Then all the subsequent documents referring to the oath of Pontida were inspired by the Historia Patria by Bernardino Corio. In an excerpt from the code of 1584 Successores S. Barnabae Apostoli in Ecclesia Mediolanensi, which refers to a note on the archbishop of Milan Umberto Pirovano, it is reported that:

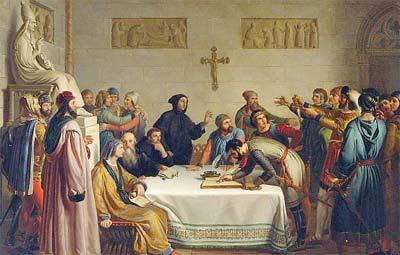
The oath of Pontida in a painting of 1836 by Giuseppe Diotti

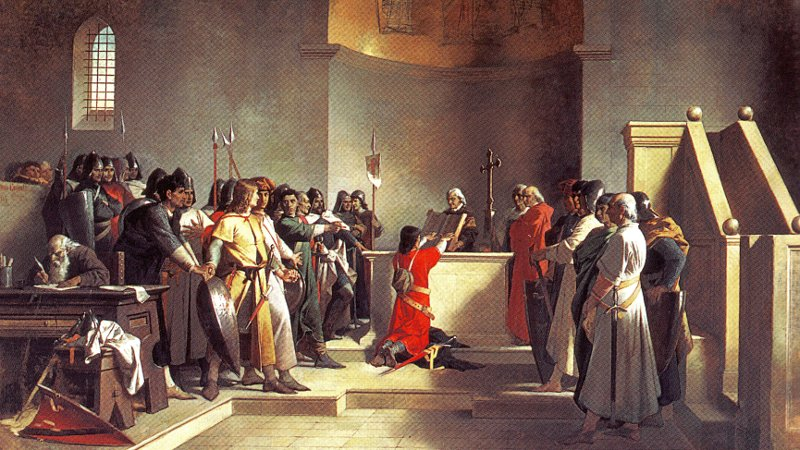
The oath of Pontida in a 1885 painting by Amos Cassioli

[...] This archbishop, a man of the greatest prudence, after having held a meeting with the surrounding cities in the church of San Giacomo in Pontida in the Bergamasco to favor the rebuilding of the city of Milan, happily completed his desired initiative; but when death came, he could not fulfill his longed-for desire. [...]

— Successores S. Barnabae Apostoli in Ecclesia Mediolanensi

In Archiepiscoporum Mediolanensium series historico-chronologica, which was compiled by Giuseppe Antonio Sassi in 1755 and which is linked to the aforementioned text of 1584, it can instead be read:

[...] The Galesini, in the Synod Series, reports that this archbishop has been busy because his metropolis, destroyed by Federico, flourished again: that for this purpose he held a meeting in Pontida with the rectors of the neighboring cities to swear an alliance to free themselves from a game of terrible slavery and thus return to their original freedom; and finally that he attended you. [...]

— Giuseppe Antonio Sassi, Archiepiscoporum Mediolanensium series historico-chronologica

=== Hypothesis on a possible oath of Pontida ===
However, it is possible that there were other agreements signed by the municipalities of the Lombard League of which the documented trace was then lost. In fact, over the centuries, there are many examples in which several meetings were needed to write down all the aspects of a bargaining: in other words, in history, it has been difficult to define in detail a pact or an alliance in few sessions.

As far as Pontida is concerned, we must also observe its close link with Milan: the municipality near Bergamo belonged to the archdiocese of Milan although it was understood, from a geographical point of view, in the county of Bergamo.

It is therefore not excluded that there was also an oath at Pontida, whose references to contemporary documentation were then lost.

== Commemorations ==
Every year at Pontida, in the month of June, in the Giuramento square, the historical phases that led to the birth of the military pact signed, according to tradition, on 7 April 1167 are recalled by about one hundred people in costume. On the occasion of the re-enactment, recreational and cultural events are also organized.

Since 1990, the autonomous political party of the Lega Nord has annually organized a meeting at Pontida that celebrates the eponymous medieval oath. During the event the most important political exponents of the party intervene.
