= Maria Elena Tiepolo Oggioni =

Italian countess tried for murder

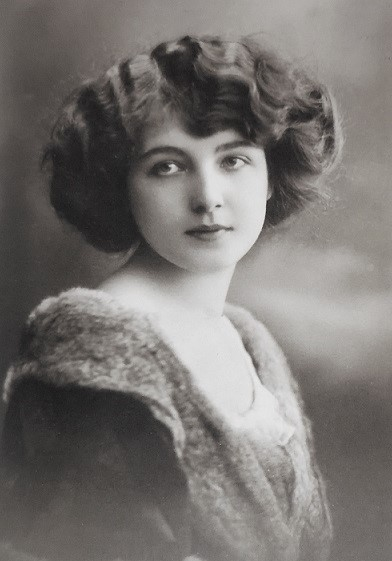
- A picture of Maria taken in 1900
- Born: Maria Elena Tiepolo; 1879; Venice
- Died: December 24, 1960 (81); Rome
- Spouse: Carlo Ferruccio Oggioni (m. 1901)

Maria Elena Tiepolo Oggioni (1879–1960) was an Italian countess most well known for being accused of murdering her lover. She underwent a highly publicized trial in 1914 that reporters called a "trial of the century."

== Family ==
Maria was born in 1879 in Venice, Italy. She was the daughter of Giandomenico Tiepolo, a count descended from a Doge of Venice and the painter Giovanni Tiepolo, and the Countess Laderchi-Tiepolo. Maria was claimed to suffer from a fragile mental state, attributed to the epileptic seizures she suffered from as a child and a number of deaths in the family. Her sister died from meningitis, her brother committed suicide, and her father died suddenly after a stroke. Throughout her life, Maria underwent treatments for hysteria multiple times, including shortly before shooting Quintillo.

== Life ==
Maria was 20 when her father Giandomenico was transferred to the court of Camerino in 1890. There, she met an officer in the Bersaglieri, Carlo Ferruccio Oggioni, whom she married in 1901. Afterwards, Carlo was transferred to Somalia, and Maria gave birth to two children: Gianna and Guido. In 1913, Carlo was promoted to the rank of captain and returned to Italy with his family, where he was assigned to a post in Sanremo. At his new post, he had a 19-year-old attendant named Quintillo Polimanti, described in newspapers as a handsome young man with curly blonde hair.

Maria and Quintillo met and began a relationship described as excessive and inappropriate by their acquaintances. In one instance, onlookers at a beach were scandalized when they saw Maria and Quintillo dressed only in bathrobes while on a boating trip. While the relationship may have been inspired by boredom on Maria's part, the young soldier was completely taken with Maria, and one day bragged to his bunkmates about the affair, showing them a locket holding a picture of Maria and a lock of her hair. Quintillo also confided in his sister Dina when visiting her in August 1913. He told her that, while he was there, they would receive letters addressed to her, but in reality they would be for him. These letters were affectionate in nature.

When Quintillo returned to Sanremo, he decided to express his feeling for her openly, and sent her a letter that he had written expressing his love for her. Maria was either taken aback by the letter or had already previously made up her mind prior to reading it, but she decided that the relationship had gone too far. She told one of Quintillo's superiors that the young man was acting too familiar with her, and even fired him before changing her mind and rehiring him. Sometime before the murder, Maria became pregnant.

On the morning of November 8, Quintillo met with Maria, where he was shot and killed by the countess. Maria later recounted the meeting during her testimony to the Corte d'Assise of Oneglia, saying:

"That morning I wasn't feeling well because I hadn't been able to fall asleep the night before. Around 10 o'clock, I heard the doorbell ring and answered the door. [...] Polimanti tried to hug me and told me he loved me. I shoved him away, ran to my room, and locked the door. He followed me and banged on the door. I didn't answer and threw myself on the bed; I soon came to the decision that it had to end... I decided to pack my bags and leave immediately. [...] I didn't think Polimanti would come after me again, so I opened the door but I found myself face-to-face with him again, who, hugging me said "You must be mine, I've wanted you for so long." I resisted for a long time [...] I managed to separate from him, then grabbed the revolver from a dresser drawer and pointed it at him saying "If you don't leave, I'll shoot." He came towards me with open arms and said "I'm not afraid." I then fired the gun and the young man, shot in the face, from which I saw blood spray, fell."

After shooting Quintillo, Maria informed a neighbor of what had happened, telling them that she had shot the young man to defend her children. However, when investigators arrived to question the countess and inspect the crime scene, they learned that the countess and Quintillo were the only people in the house, and that the children were at school. She told the investigators that she had acted in self-defense, and that she had only intended to scare Quintillo. She was taken to prison the same day, but believed she would be cleared of any wrongdoing and released within a few days.

=== The Trial ===
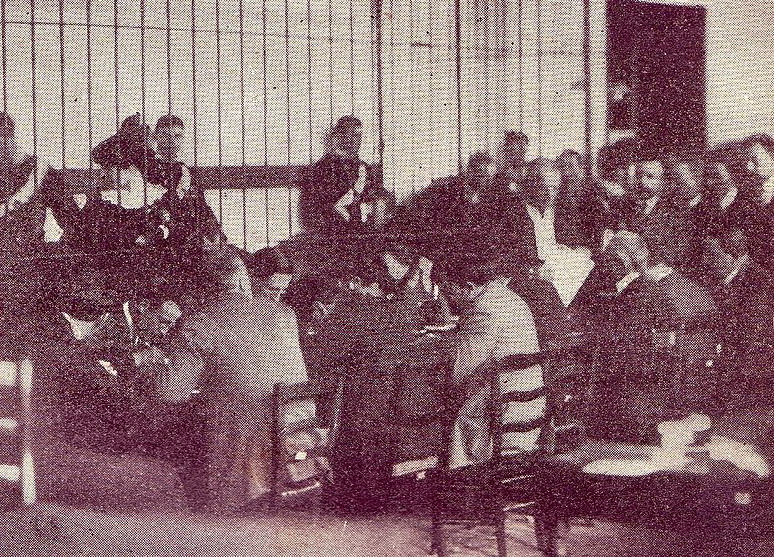
A picture of Maria in the courthouse

The trial began on April 29, 1914. Maria was represented by the famous attorney Orazio Raimondo. The trial was surrounded by a media frenzy both in support of and against the countess, largely due to the scandal surrounding the illicit relationship and the reversal of social roles, with the murderer being a beautiful, aristocratic woman. The crime was viewed as both a reversal of the social order— a countess killing an orderly— and a defense of it: Maria claiming to kill only to protect her honor. Due to the courtroom being open to the public, newspapers would cover the proceedings every day, often on the front pages. A reporter from La Stampa wrote that, every morning, the public would amass outside the courthouse, and when the doors opened, they would fight and rush in to get the best seats.

The defense of the countess held that she had been defending her and her husband's honor from an attacking Quintillo. The prosecutors raised evidence of the letters Maria had sent to Dina's home and the locket that Quintillo had shown his friends. Additionally, Maria's pregnancy, which she miscarried while in prison, was alleged to be the result of her affair with Quintillo. The prosecutors tried to have Maria undergo a mental examination, but the court refused.

On June 2, 1914, after 8 hours of deliberation, Maria was acquitted of the murder on grounds of self-defense.
