= Giuseppe Mazza (painter) =

Italian painter

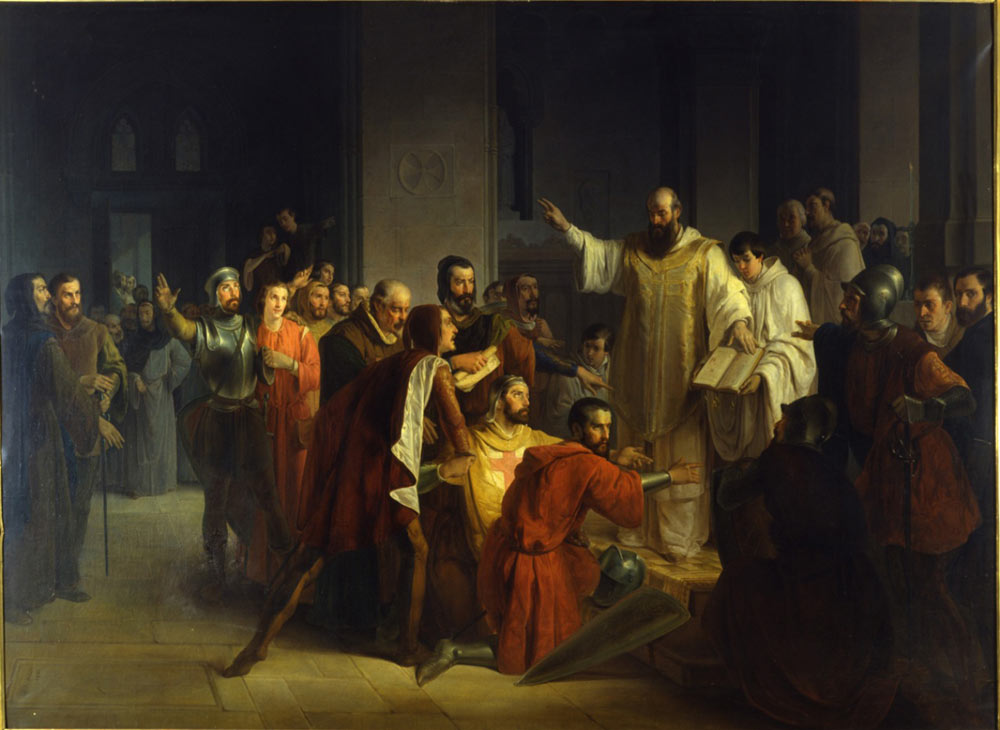
Oath of Pontida (1851)

Giuseppe Mazza (13 September 1817 – 14 February 1884) was an Italian painter active in a Romantic style.

== Biography ==
He was born and died in Milan. Among his paintings are: Maria de' Medici; the genre painting Arte antica (exhibited at 1881 at Milan); Chi va e chi viene dal mercato and Un miniatore in Cantina (exhibited in 1884 at Turin); and Il giuramento di Pontida (The Oath of Pontida, 1851).

He studied at the Brera Academy in the 1830s, and then under Francesco Hayez. In 1848, along with Luciano Manara and Augusto Anfossi, he joined the revolution against the Austrian occupation of the city. He also fought with the Italian armies in 1859. The Museum of Science of Milan has over a dozen of his works on display, including: Alla fonte (1881); Busto di donna (1880–1884 ); La soppressione del monastero (1867); La bottega di un antiquario (1876–1879 ); Anticamera d'un patrizio (1876); Mattino di Quaresima (1882); Rembrandt e i suoi modelli (1856 ); Donna con cane e gatto vicino al caminetto (1875–1880); Masaniello (1857); L'addio (1881); Donna con cani (1875–1880); Bambina con fiore (1850–1860); Self-portrait(1850); and Baciamano di un cavaliere (1878–1883).
