= Arimannia =

Italian group of warriors

Arimannia (from Lombard ari-mann, "man of the army", that is "free man active in the army"; akin German "heer-mann") was - during the Lombard domination in Italy - a group of warriors directly subjected to the King. The aim of an Arimannia was the defence of an important strategic point.

A free-born arimann was also called baro. The residence of a baro was called baronica or arimannia, his wife was a "freifrau" ( frea or wirdibora = "dignified born"), a son from such a relationship was referred to as a "fully legitimate born" (fulboran).

Although documented only from the 8th century CE, the Arimannia is believed to have existed since the Lombard invasion of Italy.

== See also ==
- Arimannus
- Mannerbund
- Comitatus (classical meaning)
- Fyrd
- Housecarl
- Druzhina
- Thingmen
- Varangian Guard
- Hird

== Sources ==
- Sigismondi, Gino (1979). Nuceria in Umbria. Ediclio, Foligno.
