= Alberto da Giussano =

Legendary character of the 12th century

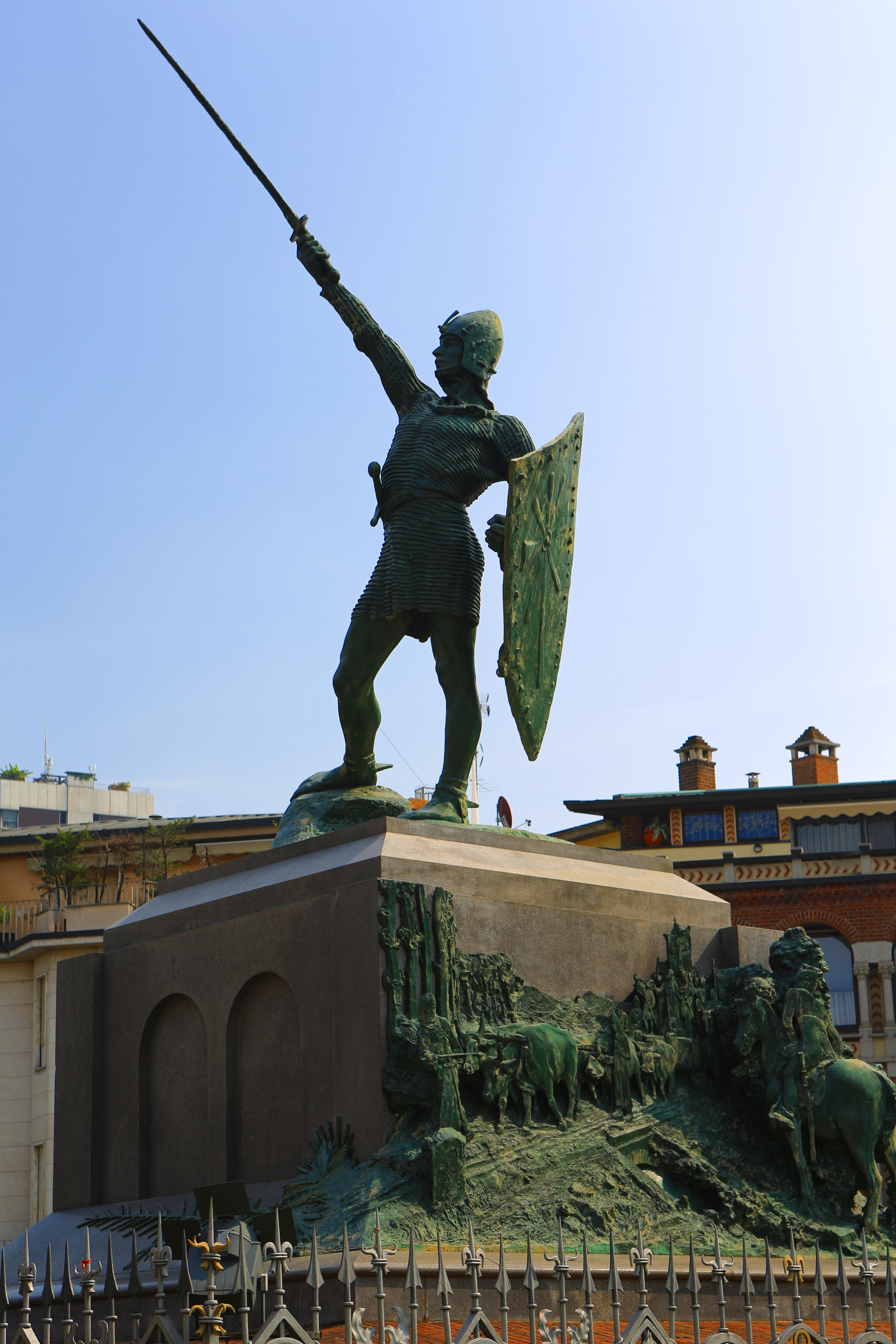
Monument to the Warrior of Legnano, often mistakenly associated with Alberto da Giussano

Alberto da Giussano (in Lombard Albert de Giussan, in Latin Albertus de Gluxano) is a figure who would have participated, as a protagonist, in the battle of Legnano on 29 May 1176. According to one historical study, the figure of Alberto da Giussano never existed and the actual military leader of the Lombard League in the famous military battle with Frederick Barbarossa was Guido da Landriano.

In the past, historians, attempting to find a real confirmation, hypothesized the identification of his figure with Albertus de Carathe (Alberto da Carate) and Albertus Longus (Alberto Longo), both among the Milanese who signed the pact in Cremona in March 1167 which established the Lombard League, or in an Alberto da Giussano mentioned in an appeal of 1196 presented to Pope Celestine III on the administration of the church-hospital of San Sempliciano. These, however, are all weak identifications, given that they lack clear and convincing historical confirmation.

== History ==
=== The legend ===
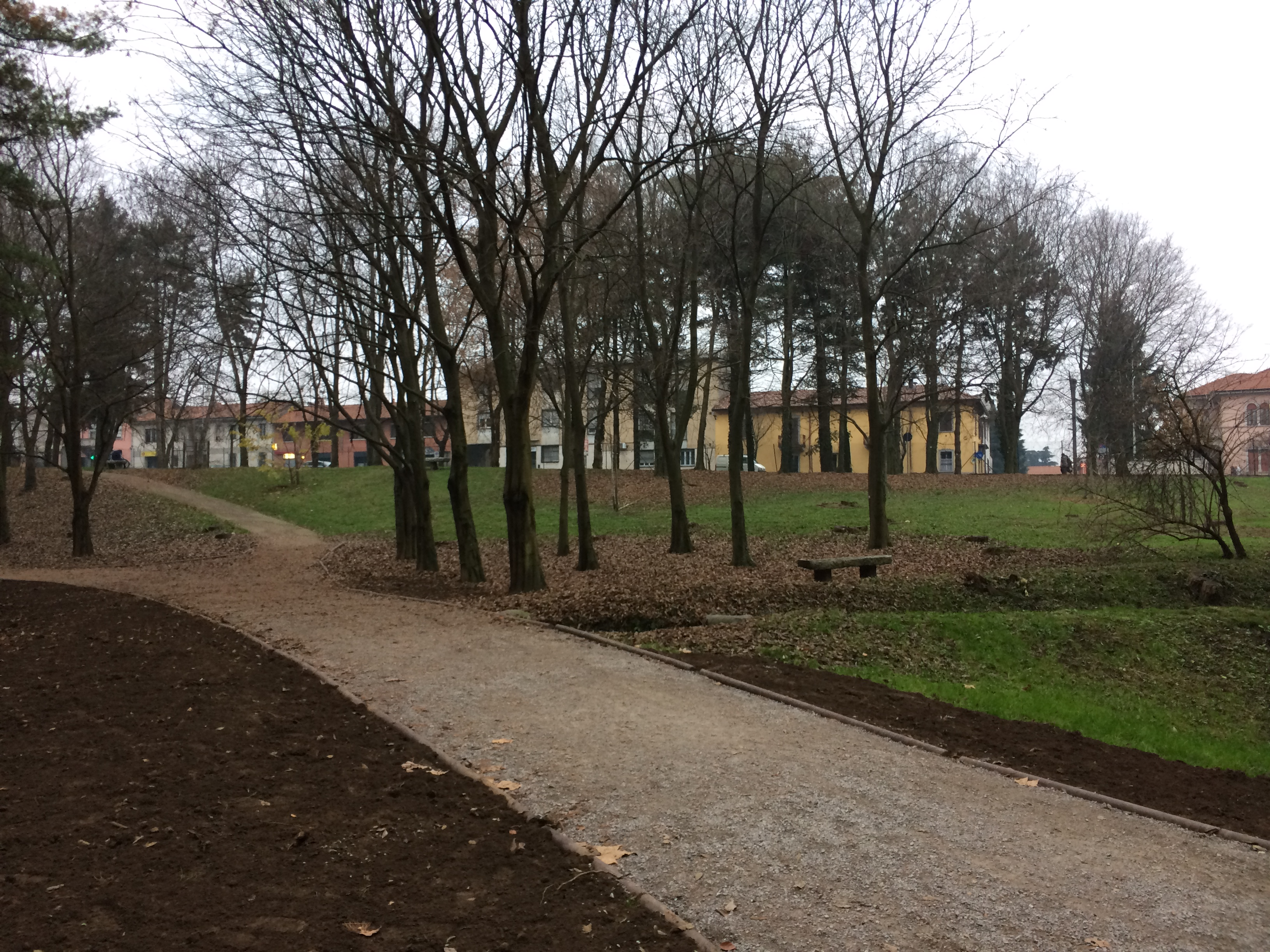
View of the Parco castello in Legnano. In the background you can see the Legnanese quarter of Costa San Giorgio, while in the foreground you can see part of the escarpment that may have been the scene of the battle of Legnano.

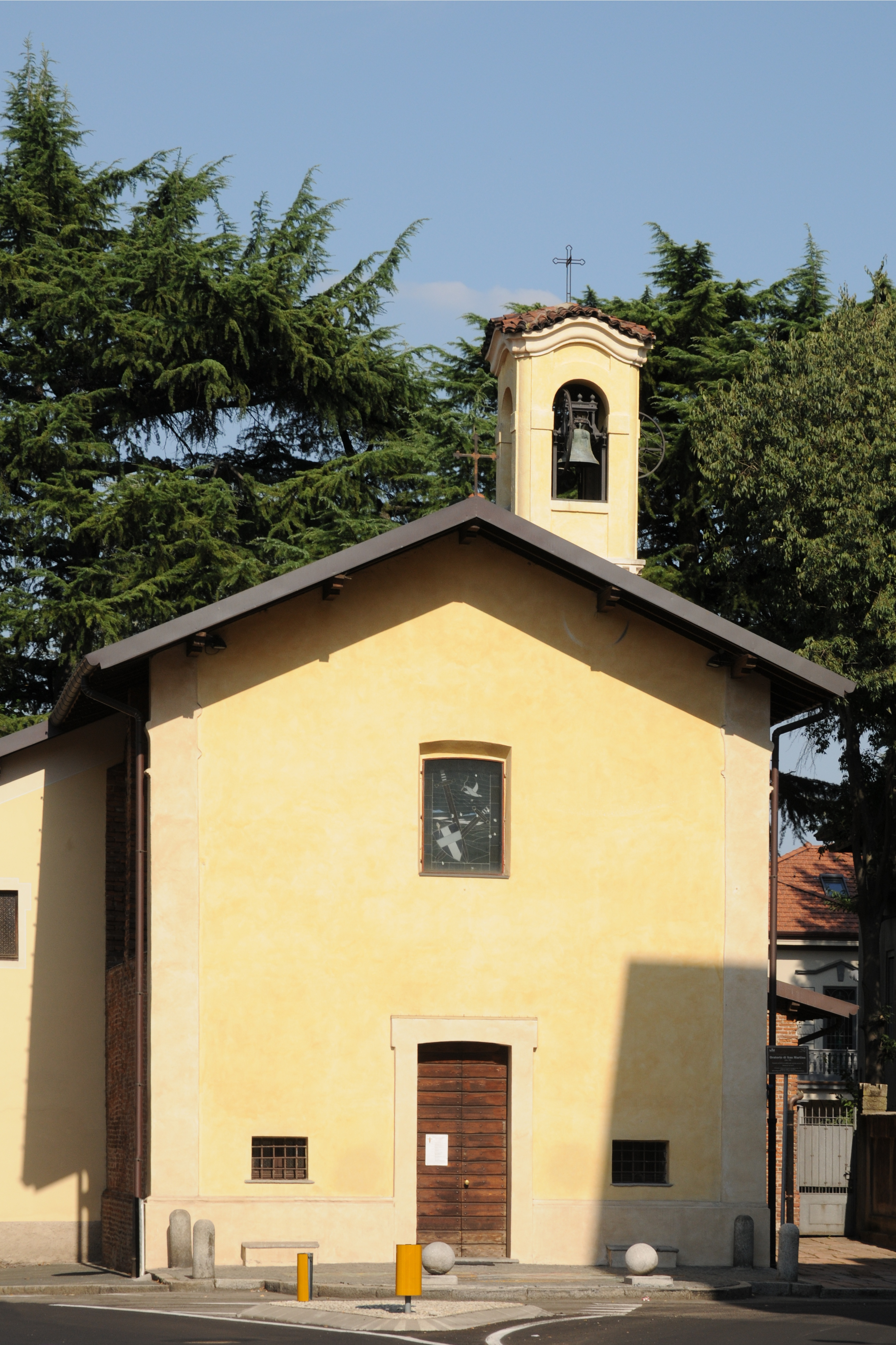
The church of San Martino in Legnano, which dominates a slope that slopes down towards the Olona, another possible place where the battle of Legnano may have been fought

The name of Alberto da Giussano appeared for the first time in the historical chronicle of the city of Milan written by the Dominican friar Galvano Fiamma in the first half of the 14th century, that is 150 years after the battle of Legnano. Alberto da Giussano was described as a knight who distinguished himself, together with his brothers Ottone and Raniero, in the battle of 29 May 1176. According to Galvano Fiamma, he headed the Company of Death, a military association of 900 young knights.

The Company of Death owed its name to the oath that made its members, which foresaw the struggle until the last breath without ever lowering its arms. According to Galvano Fiamma, the Company of Death defended the Carroccio to the extreme and then carried out, in the final stages of the battle of Legnano, a charge against the imperial army of Frederick Barbarossa.

However, contemporary sources at the battle of Legnano do not mention either the existence of Alberto da Giussano or that of the Company of Death.

From an excerpt from the Chronica Galvanica by Galvano Fiamma we can read:

[...] Upon hearing of the emperor's arrival, the Milanese ordered them to prepare their weapons in order to resist. And a society of nine hundred elected men was fought who fought on great horses who swear that no one would escape from the battlefield for fear of death and would not allow anyone to betray the Milan municipality; and also swore that they would take to the field to fight against the emperor every day. At that point the community chose the weapons and the banner and each was given a ring in his hand; and were recruited as knights in the pay of the municipality so that, if someone had fled, he would have been killed. Head of this company was Alberto da Giussano who had the banner of the municipality. Then another company of infantrymen was chosen for the custody of the carroccio, who all swore to prefer to die than to escape from the battlefield. And three hundred triangular-shaped ships are made and under each one there were six horses covered, so as not to be seen, that dragged the ships. In each ship there were ten men who moved sickles to cut the grass of the meadows as the sailors move the oars: it was a terrible construction against the enemies [...]

— Galvano Fiamma, Chronica Galvanica

While, on another excerpt of the same work, this time on the battle of Legnano, we can read that:

[...] In the year 1176, regardless of the betrayals and contravening the oath, the emperor wanted the destruction of the city of Milan. After leaving the city of Pavia, enter our territory and reach the village of Carate. Only the Pavesi and the Comaschi were with him among all the Italics. The Chronicle of Leo tells that it arrives between Legnano and Dairago. It was the third day before the calends of June, the day of the feast of the holy martyrs Sisinno, Alessandro and Martirio. Alberto da Giussano had the banner of the community and with him there were two brothers, very strong giants, namely Ottone and Rainero, who carried the banner for their brother: they were always companions on the right and on the left. When the battle began, three doves were seen rising from the altar of the aforementioned three martyrs and resting on the carroccio tree. Realizing this, the emperor fled in terror. Since then, that day became a solemn celebration. The emperor put to flight, the citizens of Milan were greatly enriched with the spoils of war of the Germans. Upon learning of the defeat of the emperor, Pope Alexander greatly rejoiced and wrote many exhortation letters in Milan, because he was more inclined to die than to leave the city of Milan [...]

— Galvano Fiamma, Chronica Galvanica

The stories of Fiamma should be taken with the benefit of the doubt since in his chronicles there are inaccuracies and legendary facts. As regards this last aspect, Fiamma declares that a certain "Leone priest" has seen, during the battle of Legnano, three doves coming out of the burials of the saints Sisinnio, Martirio and Alessandro at the basilica of San Simpliciano in Milan. The three birds then leaned on the Carroccio during the battle causing the escape of Barbarossa. In these chronicles it is also mentioned that the military structures that defended the Carroccio were three. The first was the aforementioned Company of Death, which included 900 knights, each of whom would have been provided with a gold ring. The second company was instead made up of 300 commoners guarding the Carroccio, while the third was made up of 300 scythed carts, each of which was led by ten soldiers.

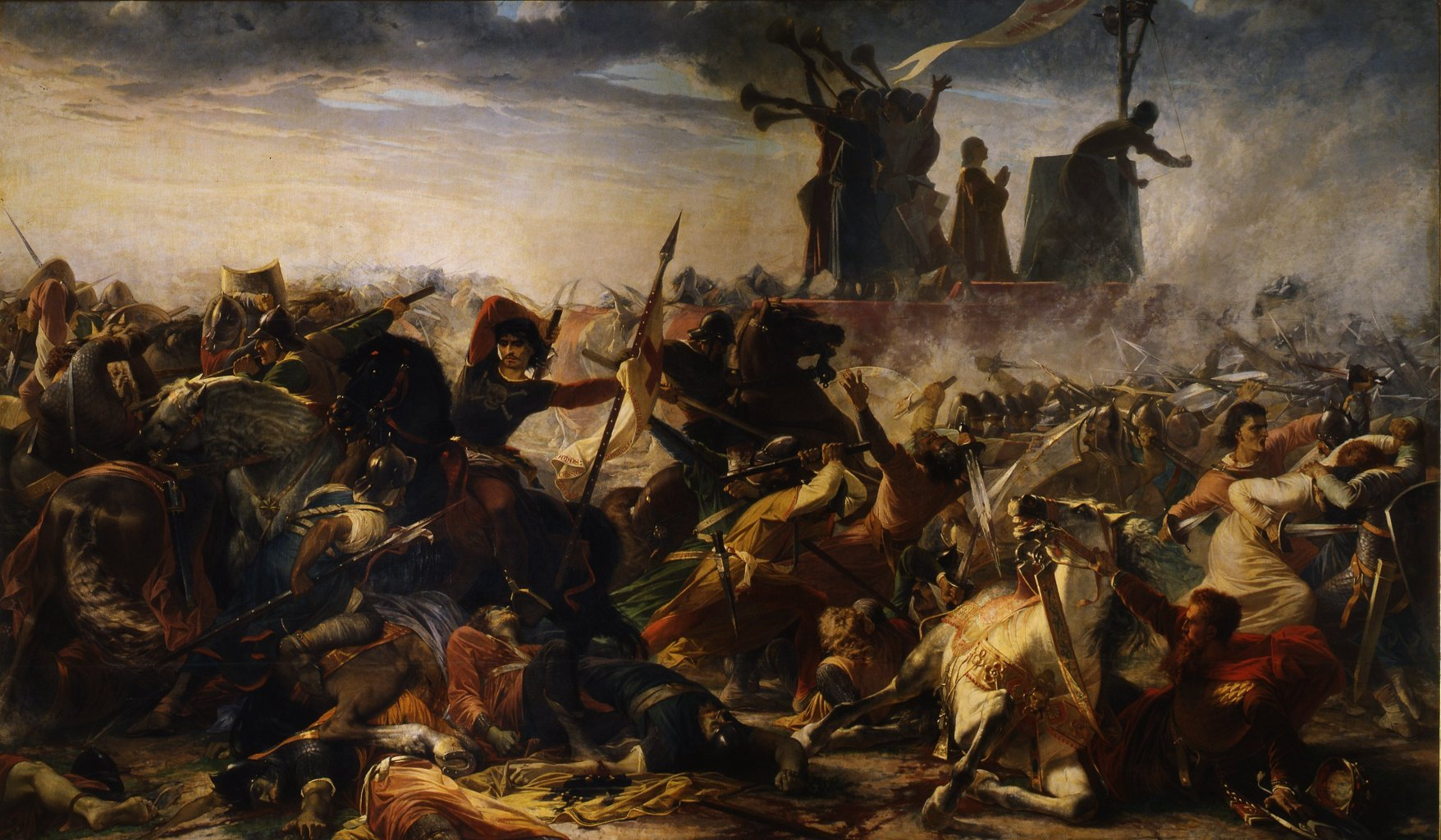
The battle of Legnano in a painting by Amos Cassioli

From these assertions, we can certainly deduce the unreliability of the tales of Galvano. It is indeed unlikely that the battle was won by the Lombard League thanks to three doves that put Barbarossa in flight. Moreover, it seems equally doubtful that Milan, during the situation of economic hardship caused by the war, had supplied as many as 900 gold rings to the knights of the Company of Death. In addition it seems strange that the other chronicles of the time do not mention the presence of 300 scythed carts, which would have been a very special event certainly noteworthy, neither Alberto da Giussano, nor the three military companies.

Galvano Fiamma, finally, in his writings, as regards the chronicles of the battle, reports the crippled toponym of "Carate" instead of Cairate (where Barbarossa, actually, stayed the night before the battle of Legnano), and asserts that there were two clashes between Barbarossa and the Lombard League: one at "Carate" (1176) and the second between Legnano and Dairago (29 May 1177), thus inventing an elusive battle of "Carate" and moving the battle of Legnano to the following year. This supports the thesis that these facts told in reality are nothing other than the fantasies of Galvano. The fact that Alberto da Giussano and the Company of Death never existed was then confirmed by many historical analyses that took place over time.

The reason for the invention of the figure of Alberto da Giussano by Galvano Fiamma probably lies in the attempt to provide the Lombard League with a heroic and prominent figure that would be in contrast to that of Barbarossa.

=== The historical facts ===
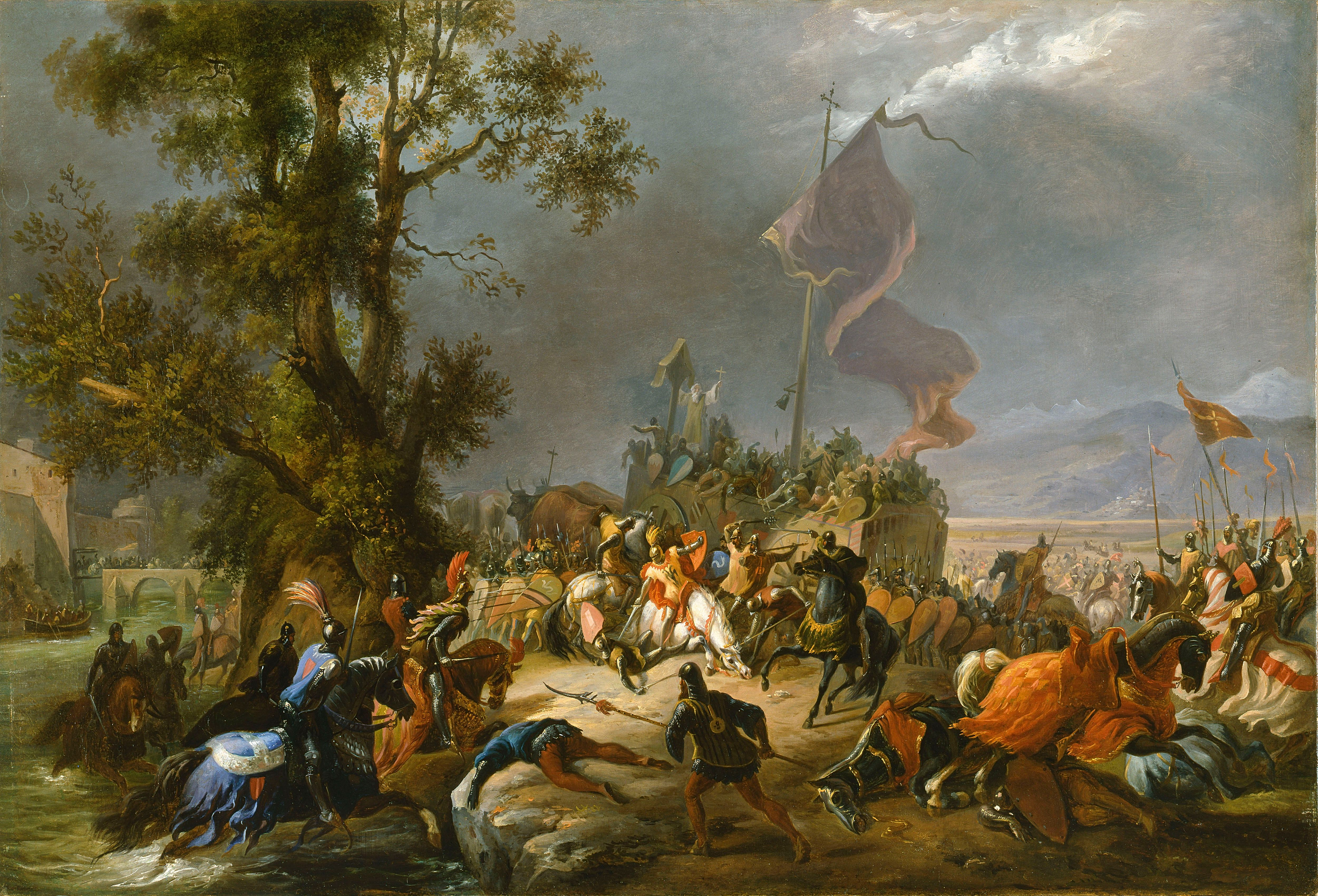
The Battle of Legnano by Massimo d'Azeglio, 1831

On the other hand, based on historical sources, the heroic and decisive resistance around the Carroccio was carried out by the municipal infantry, which allowed the remaining part of the army of the Lombard League, actually led by Guido da Landriano, to arrive from Milan and defeat Frederick Barbarossa in the famous battle of Legnano. The Carroccio, in particular, was positioned on the edge of a steep slope flanking the Olona river, so that the imperial cavalry, whose arrival was expected along the river, would have been forced to attack the centre of the Lombard League's army going up the escarpment. Barbarossa was therefore forced to attack the municipal army in a situation of disadvantage, given that it would have had to attack from below going up this valley.

Considering the phases of the battle, this could mean that the famous battle could have been fought also on part of the territory now belonging to the municipality of San Giorgio su Legnano near the Legnano district "Costa of San Giorgio", or on the territory of today San Martino district in Legnano, since it is not possible to identify, in other parts of the area, a depression with these characteristics. The army of Barbarossa then arrived on the opposite side, from Borsano: this forced the municipal infantrymen to resist around the Carroccio, given that they had the escape road blocked by the Olona river, which they had behind.

== Historical research ==
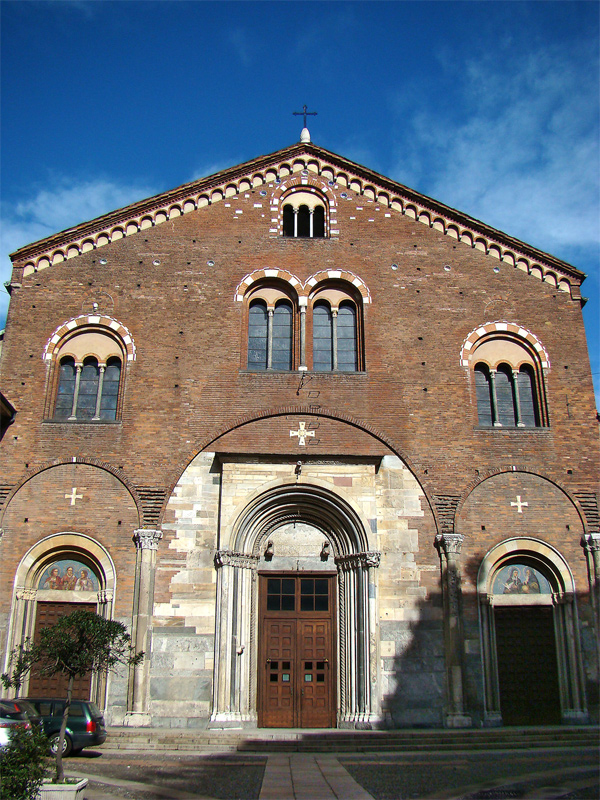
Basilica of San Simpliciano, Milan

Alberto da Giussano was a name quite in vogue at the time. Historical researches carried out for other purposes by Pio Pecchiai have traced this Alberto da Giussano, Milanese, contemporary to the events mentioned, which is mentioned, in 1196, in an appeal presented to Pope Celestine III by fifty neighbours of the Porta Comasina in Milan for a dispute over the administration of the church-hospital of San Sempliciano (at the time the hospitals were often linked to religious structures).

The fact that the name of an Alberto da Giussano appears can give us at least some certainty of existence, precisely in years close to the time of the struggle of the Lombard League against Frederick Barbarossa, of a person of that name, although there is no certainty that it was a leader, much less that he was referring to the captain who took part in the battle at the head of the Company of Death. It was then attempted to identify Alberto da Giussano with two historical figures, Albertus de Carathe (Alberto da Carate) and Albertus Longus (Alberto Longo), who are among the signatories, for the municipality of Milan, of the founding pact of the Lombard League (Cremona, March 1167).

The most surprising fact, however, remains that the Alberto da Giussano mentioned in the notarial document of the time would have lived near the church-church of San Simpliciano where the legend tells that the three white doves that the fighters would have seen during the battle of Legnano perched on the mast of the Carroccio. The notarial document which contains the undated list is in any case attributable to the years 1195–1196, which shows that the "Da Giussano" family is from Milan and also presents its exponents at the top of the municipal institutions of the city.

Contemporary to the battle of Legnano is also a certain Ottone da Giussano, who owned property in Arosio (very close to Giussano) and surroundings. He must have been a rich and remarkable person: his name appears in records of 1183, which is the same year of the signing of the Peace of Constance (which was signed on 25 June 1183 between Federico Barbarossa and representatives of the Lombard League following the events connected at the Battle of Legnano), as well as documents from 1190, 1199 and 1202. In these documents, however, it is not specified whether he was the brother of Alberto and Rainerio, or of the two brothers who, according to legend, participated in the battle of Legnano. The only certain fact is that he was a really wealthy person and that he would certainly have everything to lose with Barbarossa's policy.

However, all these identifications of people who actually existed in the Alberto da Giussano captain of the Lombard League are weak, given that they lack clear and convincing historical confirmation.

== Legacy ==
Italian political party Lega Nord makes use of his myth. The electoral emblem of the party features Alberto with an image inspired by the statue of him erected at Legnano in 1900. Also, the infantry brigade Legnano of the Italian Army used the image of this statue as a symbol. Also the Giussano-class cruiser.

== In popular culture ==
In the 2009 film Barbarossa, Alberto played by Raz Degan is featured as the protagonist.

== See also ==
- Battle of Legnano
- Company of Death
- Lombard League
