= Battle of Legnano =

1176 Lombard League victory over Emperor Frederick Barbarossa

- Part of the War of the First Lombard League in the Guelph-Ghibelline conflict
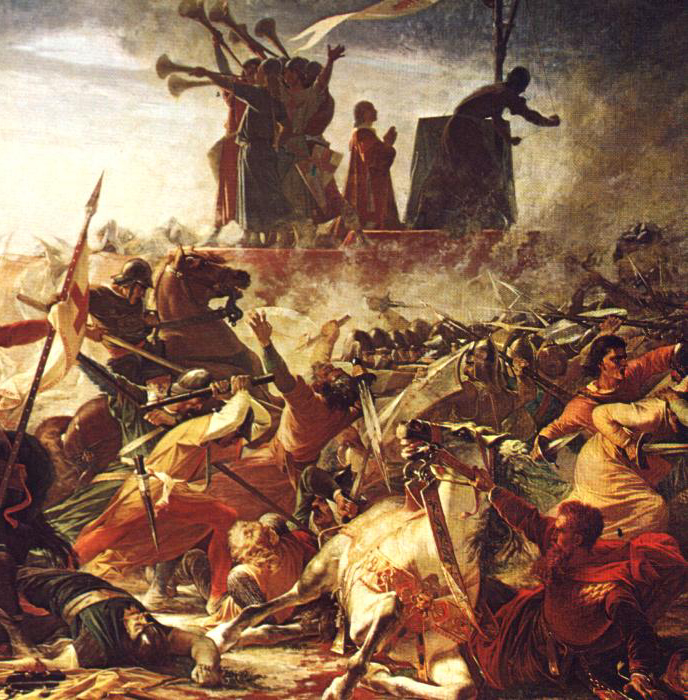
- The defence of the Carroccio during the Battle of Legnano, by Amos Cassioli
Date	29 May 1176
Location	Legnano, Lombardy, Kingdom of Italy 45°36′12″N 08°54′31″E
Result	Lombard League victory

Belligerents
Lombard League	Holy Roman Empire

Commanders and leaders
Guido da Landriano	Frederick Barbarossa; Philip of Cologne; Wichmann of Magdeburg

Strength
12,000–15,000	≈ 3,000 heavy cavalry

Casualties and losses
Few hundred killed or wounded	1,500–2,500 killed, wounded or captured
- Location within Italy

The Battle of Legnano was fought on 29 May 1176 between the army of Frederick Barbarossa, Holy Roman Emperor, and the forces of the Lombard League near Legnano, between Milan and Como, in the Kingdom of Italy. It was the climactic field engagement of Frederick's fifth Italian campaign and one of the most consequential battles of the long conflict between the emperor, the northern Italian communes and Pope Alexander III. The encounter itself arose unexpectedly from manoeuvres by two armies that were aware of one another but did not possess precise information about the other's position. Frederick was attempting to move from Como towards the security of Pavia, where he could join additional imperial and Italian forces, while the League sought to intercept him before such a concentration could occur.

The imperial army consisted principally of about 3,000 heavily equipped cavalry, including German nobles, ministeriales, mounted retainers and allied Comaschi. Opposing it was a much larger communal army of approximately 12,000–15,000 men, most of them Milanese infantry but including a substantial body of cavalry from Milan and allied League cities. An initial imperial attack routed part of the League cavalry, but the Milanese infantry maintained a compact defensive position around the carroccio. Repeated imperial assaults failed to destroy this formation. When the dispersed communal cavalry reorganised and returned to the battlefield, the League attacked the imperial army from multiple directions. Frederick entered the fighting personally and disappeared from view after being unhorsed; the loss of the imperial standard and apparent disappearance of the emperor contributed to the disintegration of imperial cohesion. The retreat became a rout in which many imperial troops were killed, captured or drowned attempting to cross the Ticino.

Legnano was not the end of imperial authority in Italy, nor did it create an independent northern Italy. Its significance lay instead in the political and strategic balance it revealed and helped consolidate. The League had shown that a coalition of autonomous communes could mobilise, concentrate and coordinate sufficient military power to defeat an imperial field army commanded by the emperor himself. Frederick retained formidable resources, loyal Italian allies and his imperial dignity, but the prospect of imposing the governmental system developed after the Diet of Roncaglia through repeated large-scale military coercion had become increasingly impracticable. Negotiations resumed within months. The resulting Peace of Venice of 1177 reconciled Frederick with Alexander III and established a six-year truce with the League; the Peace of Constance of 1183 subsequently recognised extensive communal rights while preserving formal imperial supremacy.

The battle later acquired a political and cultural importance far beyond its twelfth-century context. During the Risorgimento it was transformed into a symbol of Italian resistance to foreign domination, although the medieval conflict had been fought between competing political communities within the Empire rather than between modern nations. The legendary Alberto da Giussano and his supposed Company of Death became central to this later mythology despite being absent from contemporary evidence. Legnano is commemorated in the Italian national anthem, Il Canto degli Italiani, and through the annual Palio di Legnano.

== Background ==
=== Historical context ===
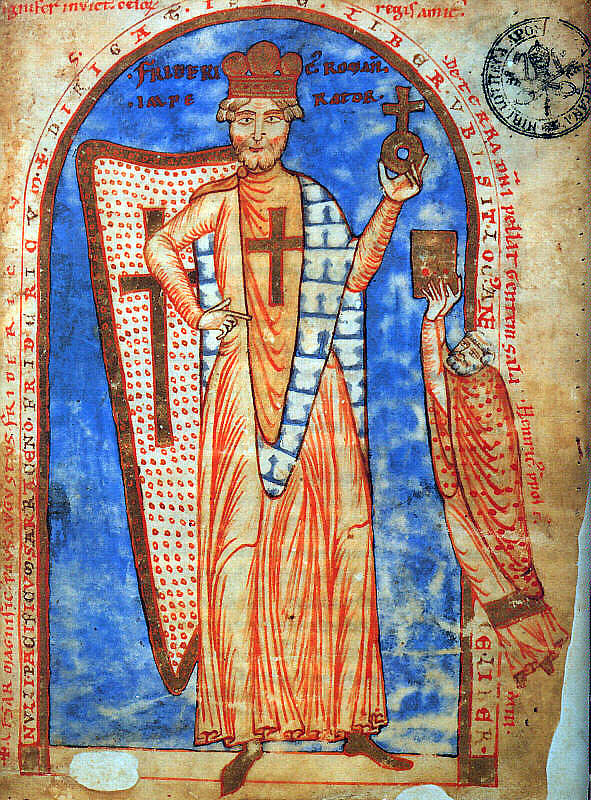
Frederick Barbarossa in a medieval representation

The conflict that culminated at Legnano developed from profound changes in the political order of northern Italy during the eleventh and twelfth centuries. The emergence of the medieval commune created governments able to mobilise taxation, militias, judicial institutions and collective political identities independently of older episcopal and aristocratic structures. These communes remained formally within the Empire, but their increasingly sophisticated institutions allowed them to exercise powers that emperors regarded as belonging to the crown. The resulting dispute was therefore not simply a struggle between "Italy" and "Germany", nor merely an extension of the Investiture Controversy. It concerned competing conceptions of jurisdiction, taxation, military obligation, urban autonomy and the practical meaning of imperial sovereignty in one of Europe's most economically developed and densely urbanised regions.

The communes themselves were far from politically united. Milan's expansion across the Lombard plain had generated hostility among neighbouring cities, particularly Pavia, Cremona, Como and Lodi. Imperial intervention could therefore be welcomed by Italian communities seeking protection against stronger rivals as readily as it could be resisted by those threatened by imperial officials. Frederick's early Italian policy operated within this fractured environment. His campaigns were not fought by a purely German army against a unified Italy: imperial forces repeatedly included Italian communes, nobles and regional allies, while the emperor's enemies remained divided by their own territorial and commercial disputes.

The imperial programme established at Roncaglia in 1158 attempted to give more systematic expression to royal rights in the Kingdom of Italy. The recovery of the regalia, the appointment of officials and the restriction of autonomous communal policies were intended to translate imperial supremacy into functioning government. In practice, however, these measures collided with institutions and political habits that had developed during periods of weaker royal intervention. The destruction of Milan in 1162 demonstrated the extraordinary coercive power Frederick could assemble, but it also intensified the incentive for threatened communes to cooperate.

The conflict with Alexander III widened the struggle further. Frederick's support for rival popes linked the Lombard contest to a European dispute over papal legitimacy, ecclesiastical obedience and the relationship between imperial and sacerdotal authority. The eventual coalition against him therefore contained several distinct but overlapping interests: communal governments seeking to preserve jurisdiction, Milanese efforts to rebuild regional influence, papal opposition to Frederick's ecclesiastical policy, and aristocratic and urban actors pursuing local rivalries of their own. These interests did not always coincide, but the pressure generated by imperial policy made sustained cooperation possible.

=== The first three descents of Frederick Barbarossa in Italy ===
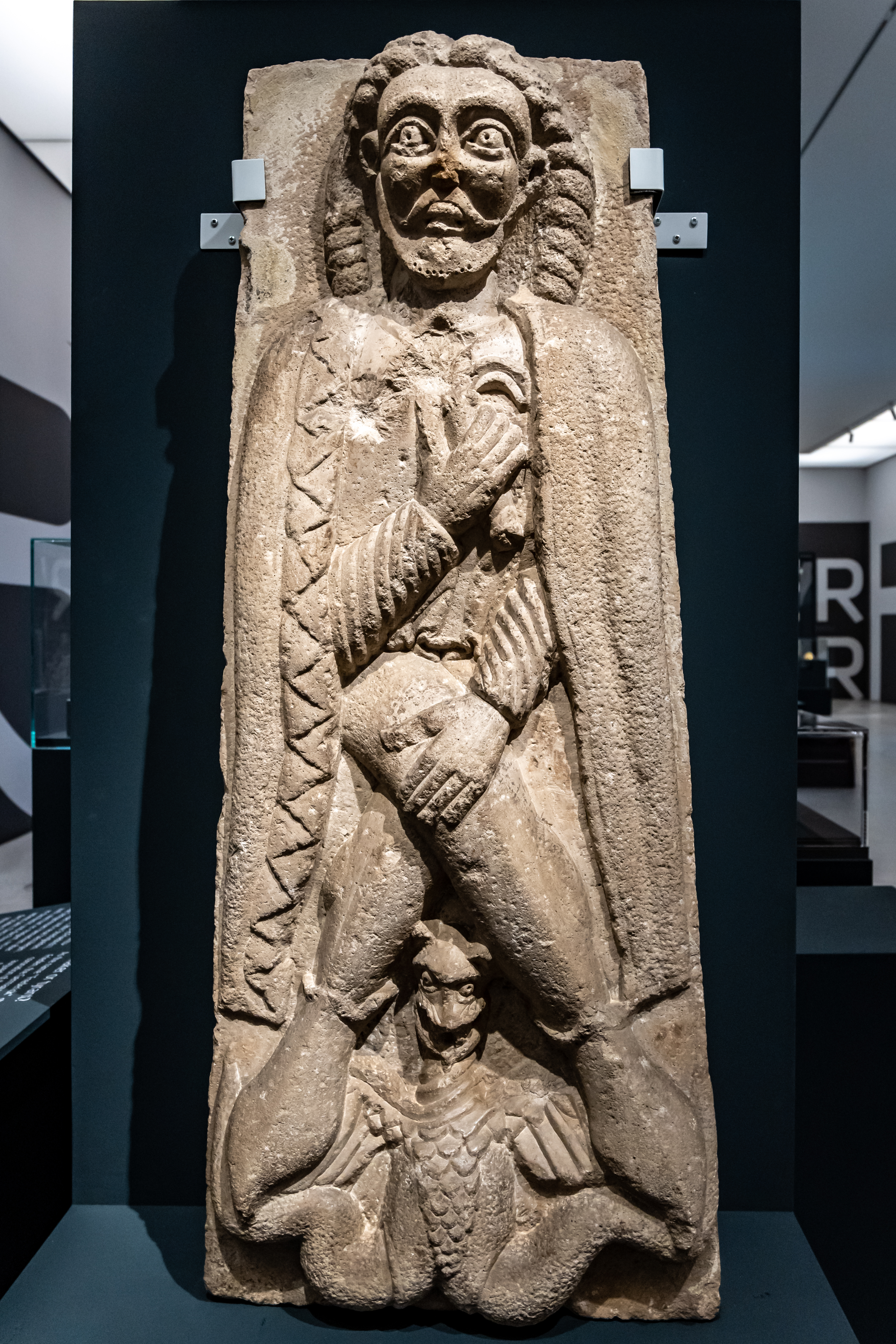
Frederick Barbarossa in a relief from the Porta Romana in Milan

Frederick's first Italian expedition of 1154–1155 established several recurring features of his Italian policy. He intervened in disputes among communes, enforced claims of imperial jurisdiction, destroyed Tortona after prolonged resistance and proceeded to Rome for his imperial coronation. The campaign demonstrated both the prestige attached to the emperor's presence and the limitations imposed by the temporary nature of German military service.

The second expedition, beginning in 1158, was conducted on a much larger scale. Milan was forced to submit, and the subsequent assembly at Roncaglia sought to define the legal foundations of imperial government in Italy. Renewed resistance eventually brought the destruction of Milan in 1162. The victory was spectacular, but its political consequences were more ambiguous. Imperial government became more intrusive at precisely the moment when the communes possessed increasingly developed institutions through which to resist it. Milan's destruction also frightened other cities by demonstrating what failure to submit could entail.

The third campaign failed to produce a comparable settlement. Resistance among the north-eastern communes and the emerging Veronese League showed that coercion in one part of Italy could generate cooperation elsewhere. By the middle of the 1160s the problem confronting Frederick was therefore no longer simply Milan. He increasingly faced networks of communes capable of exchanging troops, money and diplomatic support.

=== The fourth military campaign in Italy and the Lombard League ===
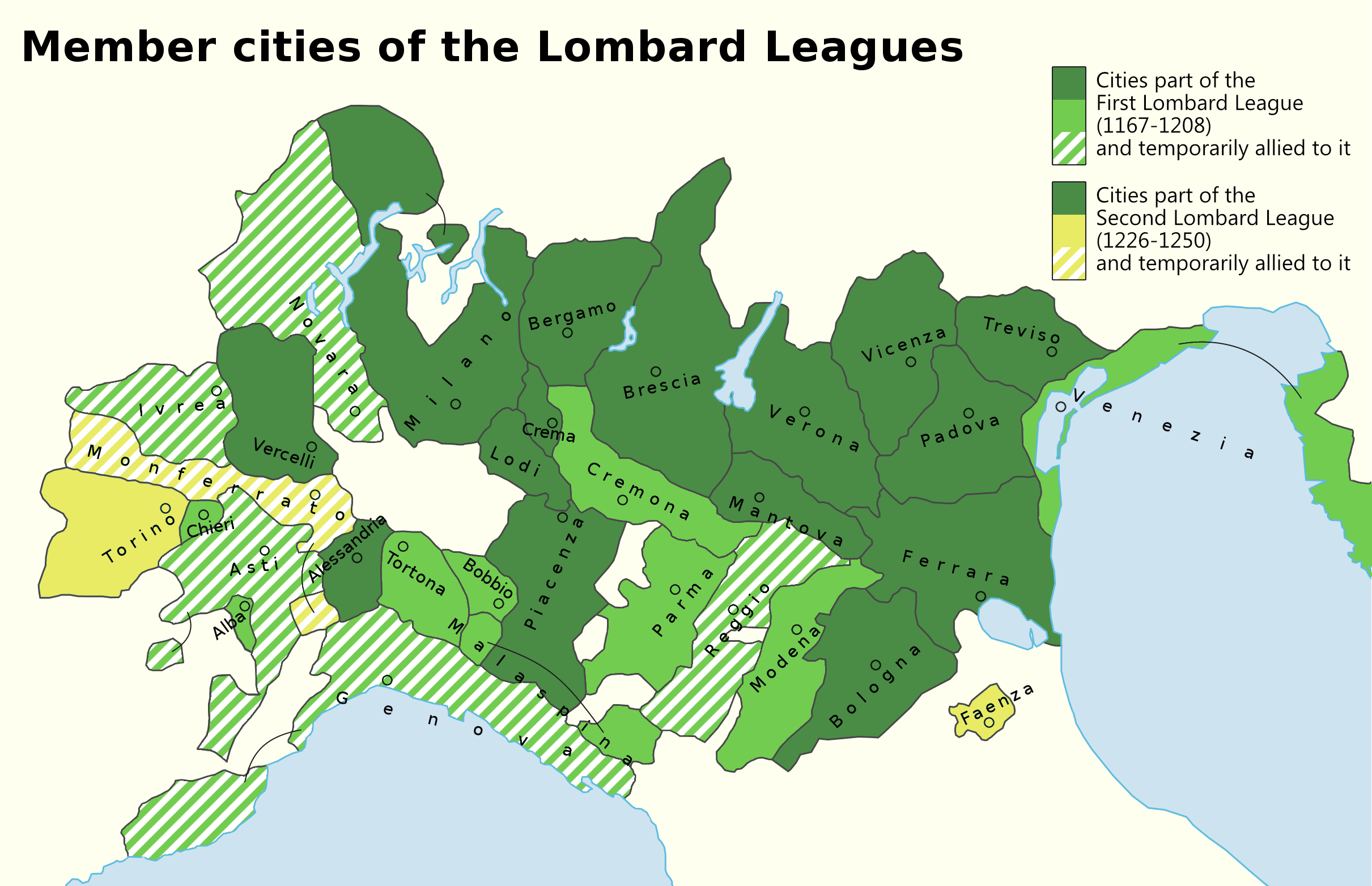
Cities associated with the Lombard Leagues

Frederick's fourth Italian campaign was initially directed principally towards the papal conflict. His capture of Rome in 1167 appeared to place Alexander III in grave danger, but disease devastated the imperial army and forced a rapid withdrawal. The sudden destruction of a large part of the imperial military establishment altered the balance in northern Italy.

In the same period the alliances that became known collectively as the Lombard League developed into an increasingly coherent political and military organisation. Its participating communes did not surrender their sovereignty to a central government, but they created mechanisms for mutual defence, arbitration and coordinated action. The League therefore represented a political technology particularly well suited to the fragmented communal world: it allowed cities to pool resources without eliminating their individual institutions.

One of its most provocative acts was the establishment of Alessandria. Founded from existing settlements in the Tanaro region and named in honour of Alexander III, the city had strategic value on communications between Liguria and Lombardy and symbolic value as an assertion that the League could create and protect a new urban community without imperial authorisation.

=== The fifth and last descent ===
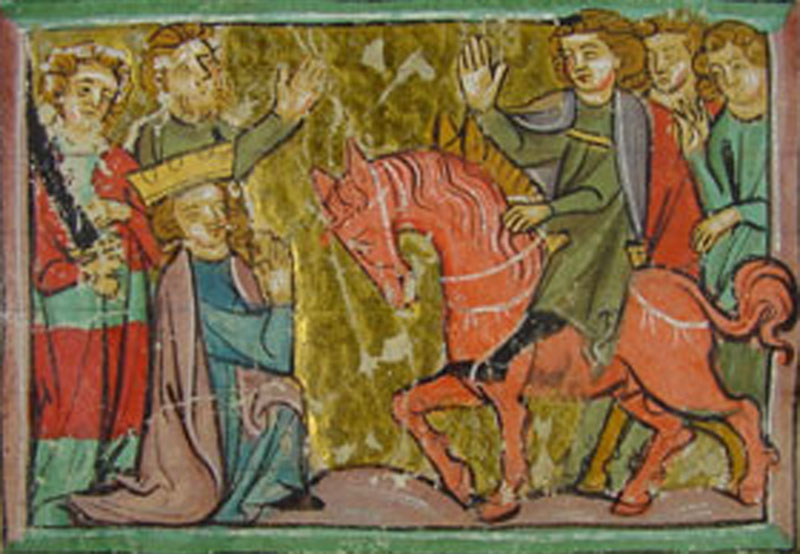
Frederick Barbarossa and Henry the Lion in a later representation

Frederick returned in 1174 with the intention of restoring his strategic position. His route through the western Alps exploited the support of Savoy and Montferrat and avoided the strongly League-controlled eastern approaches. The early stages produced genuine successes. Susa was destroyed, while Turin and Asti submitted. The emperor's appearance also encouraged divisions within the League.

The campaign then became fixed upon Alessandria. From October 1174 until April 1175 the imperial army attempted to reduce the city, but poor weather, flooding, shortages, desertion and the unexpected strength of its earthwork defences turned the operation into a costly failure. A final attempt to penetrate the city through a tunnel ended disastrously. With a major League relief army approaching, Frederick abandoned the siege and moved toward Pavia.

The confrontation at Montebello did not produce another battle. Both sides instead entered negotiations. Their willingness to negotiate reflected neither imperial collapse nor communal submission. Frederick retained a dangerous army and substantial allies, while the League had achieved its immediate objective of preserving Alessandria. The negotiations ultimately broke down, above all because the status of Alessandria remained incompatible with the political claims of both parties.

Frederick consequently sought fresh forces for 1176. The later tradition that he personally humbled himself before Henry the Lion at Chiavenna while begging for troops is not securely contemporary and developed only later. Reinforcements did arrive under Philip of Cologne, Wichmann of Magdeburg and other princes, but their numbers were smaller than Frederick required. Around 2,000 newly arrived cavalry joined approximately 1,000 men already with him in Italy.

His immediate problem was concentration. The imperial column needed to move from Como to Pavia, where further allies and supplies were available. The League understood the same operational problem from the opposite direction. Its commanders sought to intercept Frederick before he could combine his cavalry with the resources of Pavia. Legnano therefore emerged from an operational race rather than from a prearranged appointment for battle.

== Battle ==
=== Frederick Barbarossa at Cairate ===
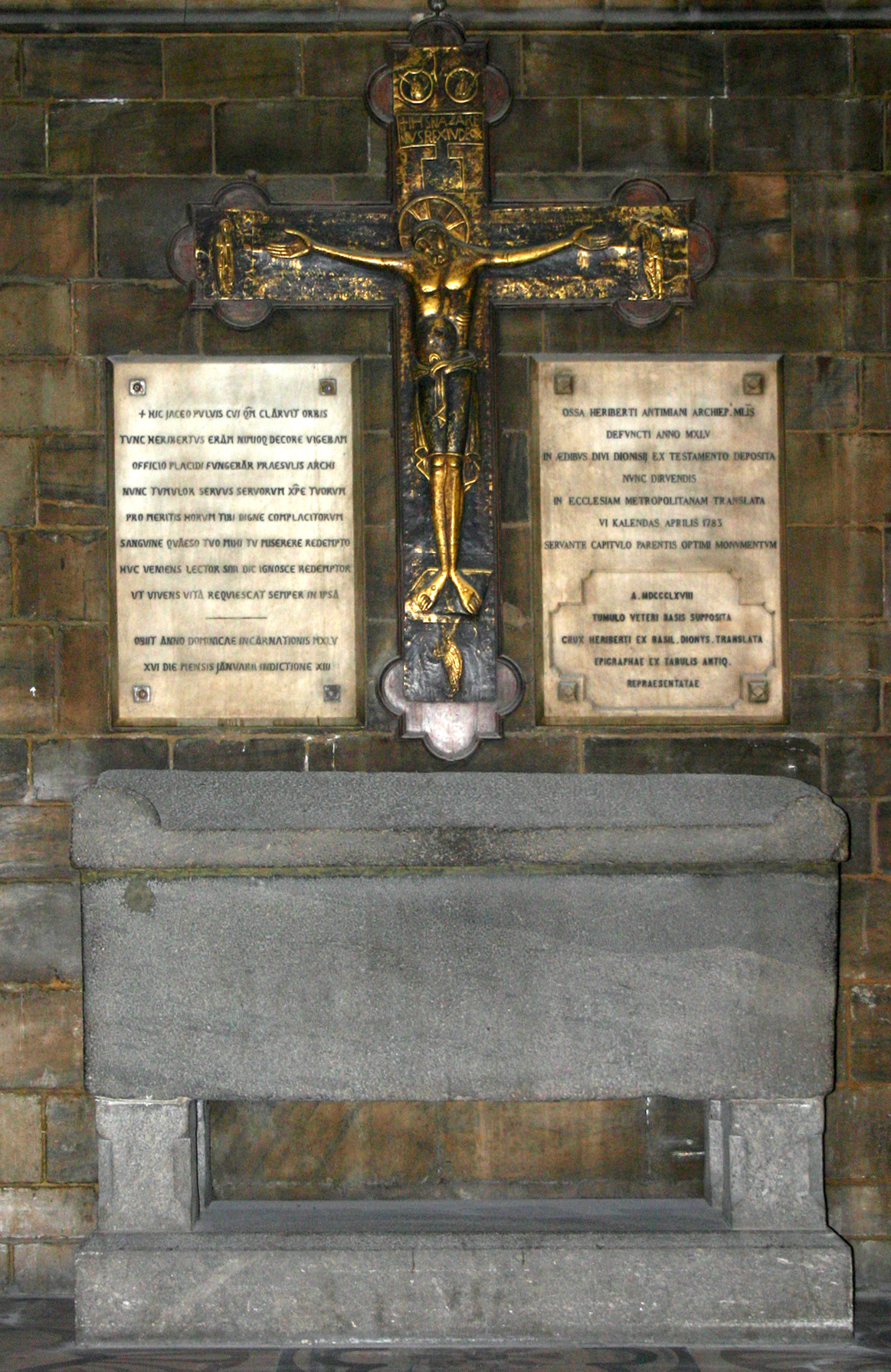
The tomb and a copy of the cross of Aribert of Milan in Milan Cathedral

On 28 May the imperial force moved south from the Como region. It consisted overwhelmingly of heavy cavalry, accompanied by retainers, servants, baggage animals and the infrastructure required to sustain a mounted aristocratic army. Its lack of infantry was deliberate: troops on foot and missile forces supplied by Italian allies had been left behind in order not to slow the march. The resulting column was highly mobile and tactically formidable but less flexible if forced to attack dense infantry in restrictive terrain.

The imperial route passed through territory associated with Seprio, where Frederick retained supporters. The precise details of his stop at Cairate and nearby Castelseprio remain partly uncertain, but by the morning of 29 May his army was moving south-west with Pavia as its operational destination. The emperor had good reason to attempt a rapid march. Once in Pavia he could recover secure communications, supplies and additional allied manpower.

The League simultaneously moved north from Milan. Its force was not a spontaneous mass levy. The communes had spent years developing arrangements for mobilisation, and Milan's large population supplied an unusually substantial infantry body. Approximately 2,000–3,000 cavalry accompanied perhaps 10,000–12,000 infantry, with contingents from Brescia, Piacenza, Vercelli, Novara, Lodi and the March of Verona reinforcing the Milanese core.

The identification of Guido da Landriano as overall field commander is probable rather than explicitly stated in the contemporary battle narratives. His political position provides the principal basis: he was a Milanese consul, an experienced knight and a rector of the League shortly before Legnano, and later occupied a conspicuously prominent position among the League's representatives.

=== The Carroccio at Legnano ===
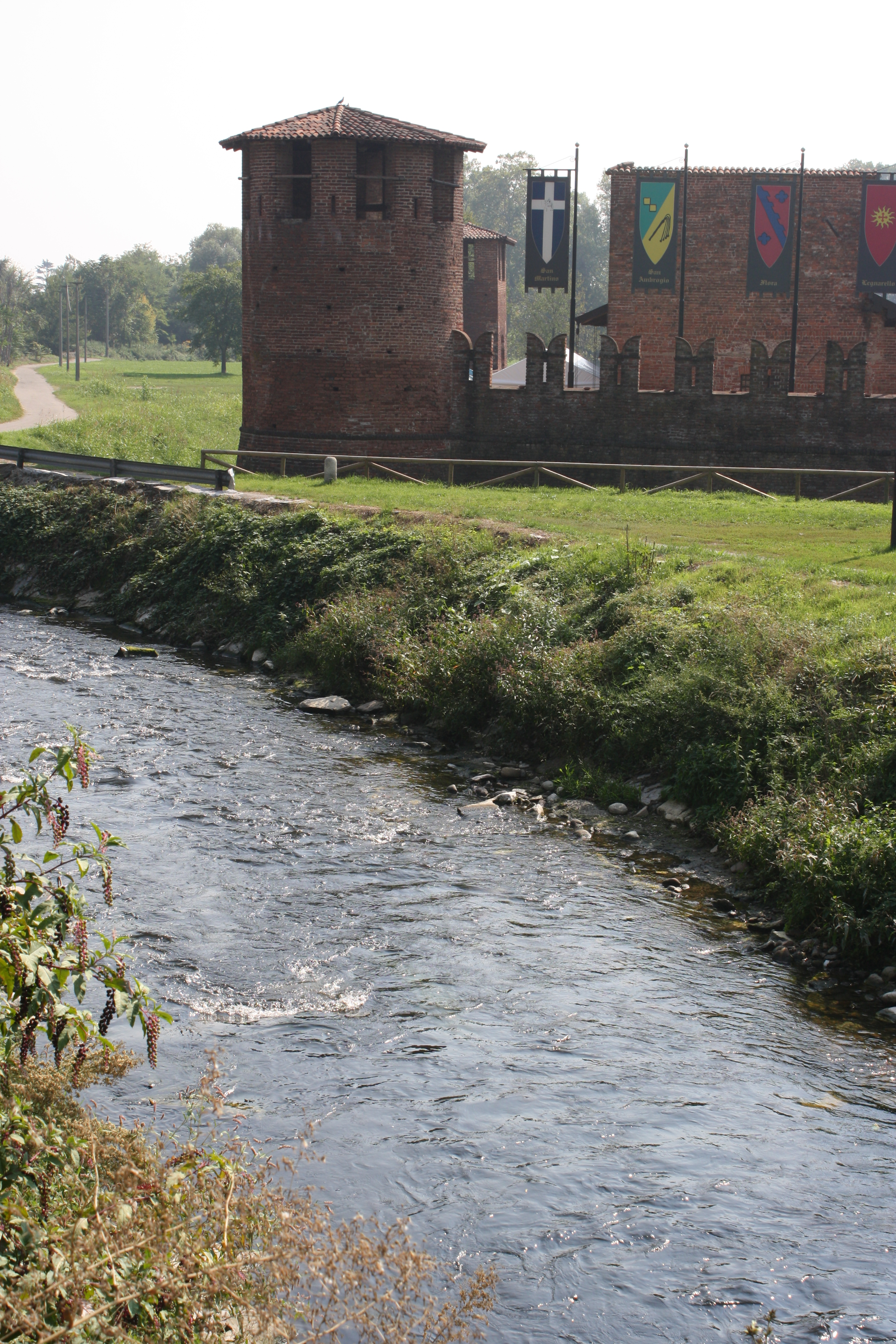
The Olona at Legnano

The carroccio was both a practical command point and a powerful civic symbol. It carried Milan's standard and the cross associated with Archbishop Aribert, providing the communal army with a visible centre in an environment where battlefield communications depended heavily on flags, trumpets and other signals. Its importance did not mean that a permanent elite "guard" existed around it; the later Company of Death belongs to a much later legendary tradition.

The League deployed in the Legnano region to block the approaches toward Milan and interfere with Frederick's movement toward Pavia. The landscape of woodland, tracks, waterways and broken ground limited visibility and made reconnaissance essential. The precise location of every phase remains debated because contemporary descriptions preserve variant and sometimes corrupted place-names. The first fighting is generally located between Borsano and Busto Arsizio, while the principal infantry stand occurred in or near Legnano.

The League's numerical superiority was itself a military achievement. Numerous autonomous communes had succeeded in concentrating thousands of men in the correct operational zone while keeping enough forces elsewhere to protect their own territories. Numerical superiority therefore reflected coordination, intelligence, mobilisation and political cooperation rather than a simple demographic accident.

=== First contact near Borsano ===
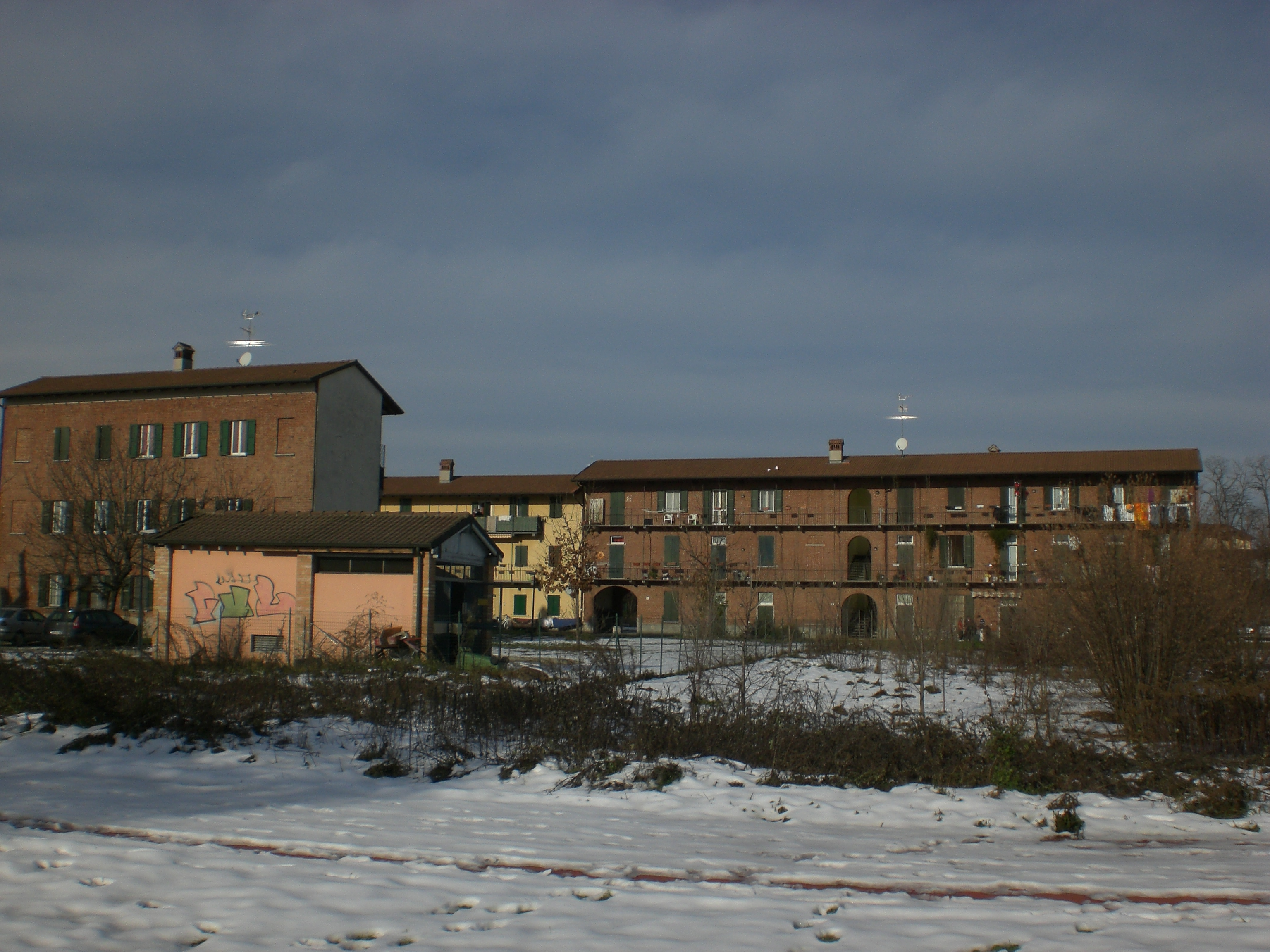
Cascina Brughetto near the probable area of the opening clash

The battle began with reconnaissance forces rather than with the deliberate deployment of both complete armies. About 700 League cavalry encountered an imperial advance body of roughly 300 mounted men. The larger communal detachment initially pressed the imperials, but the imperial vanguard withdrew in good order toward Frederick's main force. The pursuing Lombards then found themselves facing the full weight of the German cavalry.

Frederick immediately exploited the opportunity. The imperial cavalry charged and drove much of the League mounted force into retreat. This opening phase demonstrated precisely why the emperor's approximately 3,000 heavy cavalry remained so dangerous despite his overall numerical inferiority. German aristocratic and ministerial cavalry possessed considerable battlefield cohesion and experience, and in open movement they could overwhelm a less organised mounted detachment.

The success, however, created a new tactical situation. By pursuing the retreating cavalry Frederick's force came against the League infantry around the carroccio. The immediate route toward Pavia could not simply be resumed while this large hostile body remained intact. An imperial attack was therefore not necessarily an irrational decision produced solely by pride. Breaking the communal line offered the most direct method of clearing the operational obstacle and preventing the Lombards from maintaining pressure on the imperial march. Considerations of honour, confidence in heavy cavalry and the political risks of appearing to withdraw almost certainly also formed part of the decision-making environment.

=== Defence of the Carroccio ===
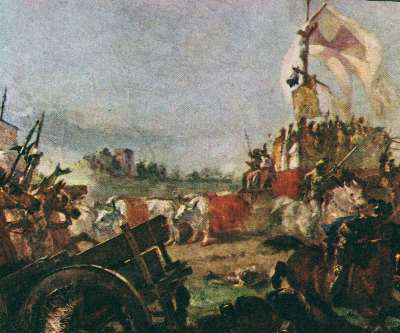
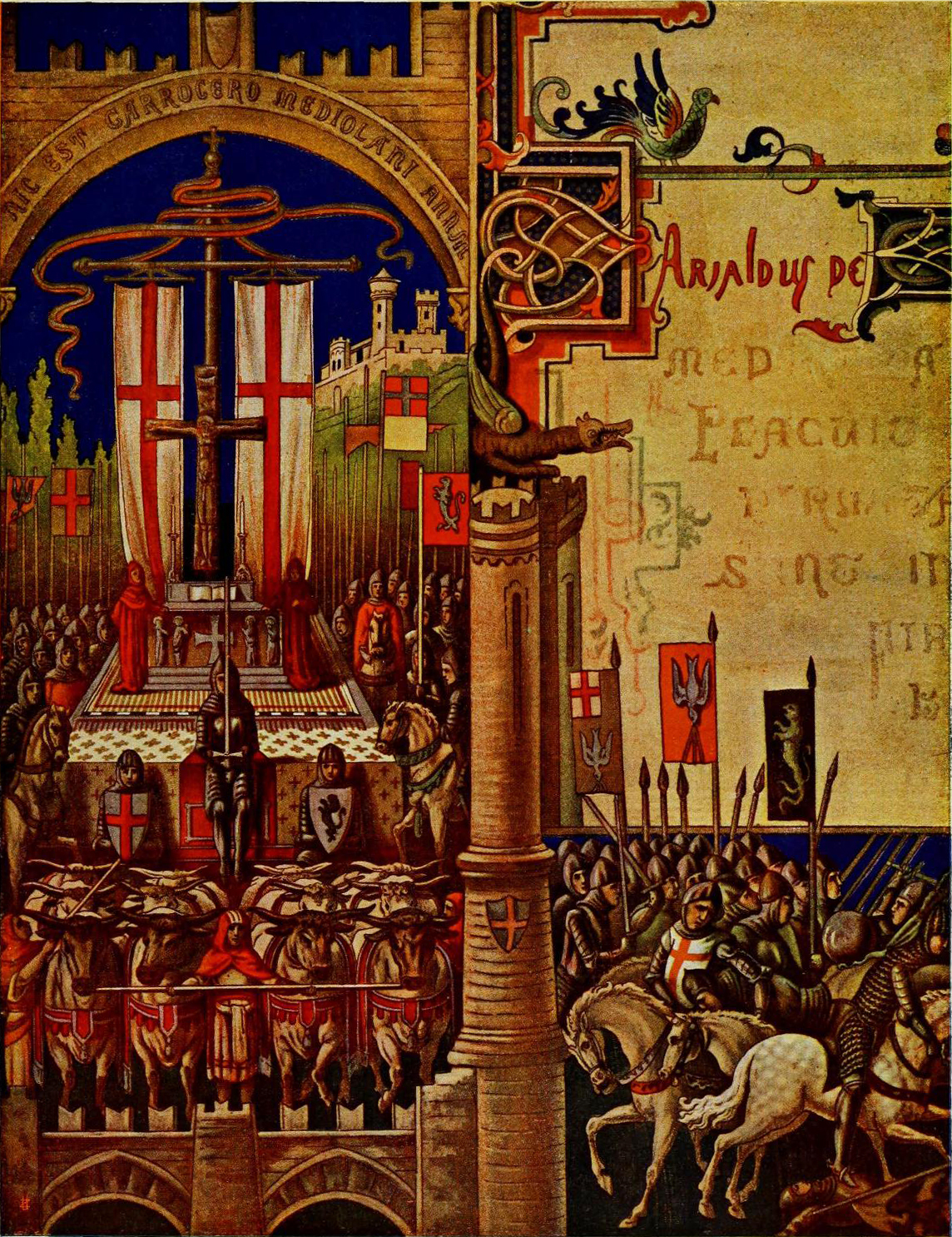
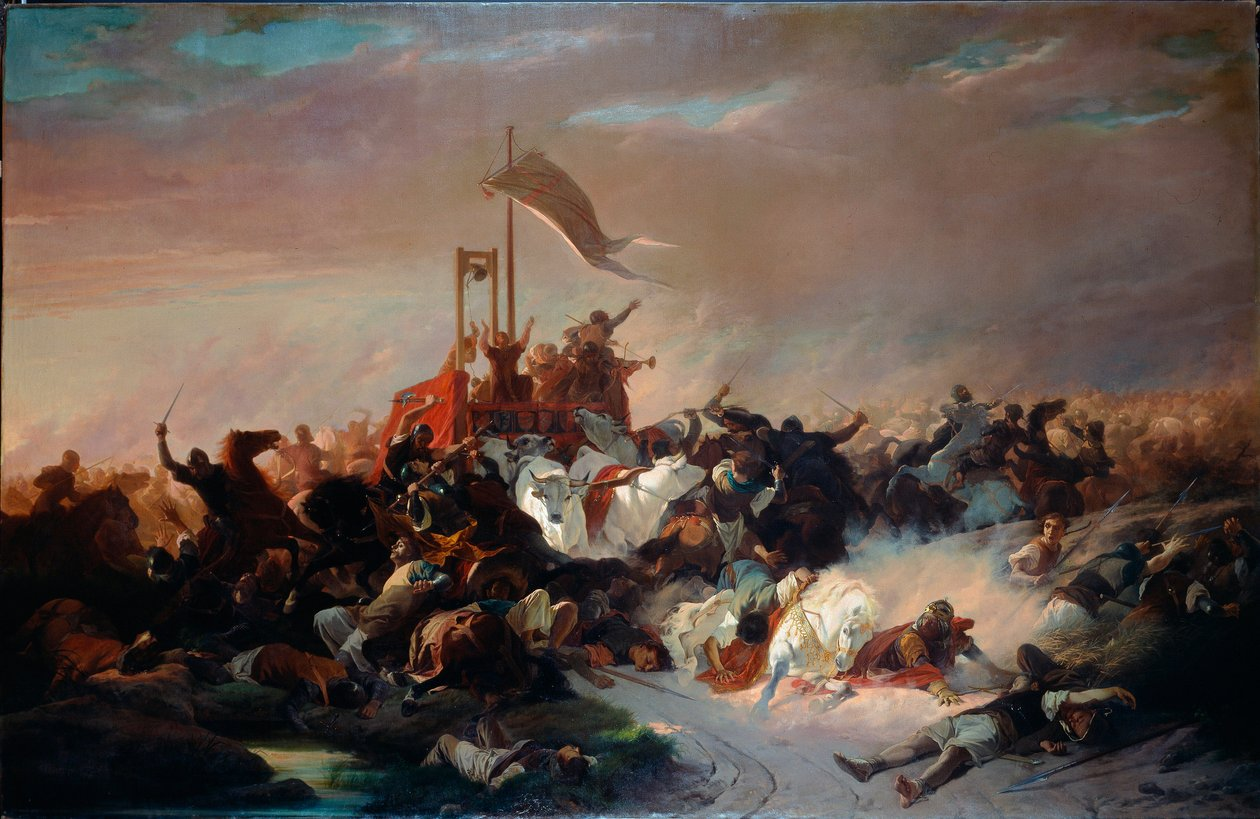
Clockwise from top:
- The Carroccio at Legnano by Amos Cassioli
- A medieval representation of a carroccio
- The battle imagined by Enrico Pollastrini

The decisive phase became a prolonged contest between imperial cavalry and dense communal infantry. The Milanese foot soldiers formed successive defensive lines around the carroccio, using shields and long spears to create a compact front. The exact number and geometry of these lines cannot be recovered with certainty, but the essential tactical fact is clear: the infantry refused to dissolve when the mounted arm of the League was driven away.

This resistance mattered because cavalry's tactical advantage depended upon producing disorder. A coherent infantry formation braced behind shields and spear points deprived mounted attackers of easy gaps and exposed horses as well as riders to injury. Repeated attacks could still break such a formation, but each unsuccessful assault consumed time, strength and cohesion. The battle consequently became an endurance contest.

The imperial attacks continued for hours. Parts of the Lombard formation were driven back, yet a core remained in position. The carroccio's symbolic role reinforced the tactical situation: abandoning the wagon would have meant abandoning the most visible representation of Milan's collective political identity, giving the defenders a powerful reason to hold together. Their cohesion was also strengthened by neighbourhood, kinship and civic relationships linking men who fought beside people they knew.

The resistance should not be reduced to a romantic story of untrained peasants defeating professional knights. The League army contained experienced cavalry, and communal infantry could possess substantial equipment and repeated experience of campaigning. The victory resulted from the interaction of numbers, formation, terrain, morale, tactical endurance and the eventual return of the mounted troops, not from a single miracle of infantry heroism.

=== Lombard counterattack and imperial rout ===
The cavalry that had withdrawn from the first phase eventually reorganised and returned. Its arrival transformed the balance around the carroccio. Imperial cavalry that had spent hours attacking the infantry now faced pressure from another direction, while the communal foot soldiers moved forward from their defensive positions.

Battlefield communication became increasingly difficult. The imperial standard-bearer was killed and the standard lost, depriving sections of the German force of one of their principal visual reference points. Frederick responded in the characteristic manner expected of an aristocratic war leader and entered the fighting personally. The action could inspire troops, but it also exposed the commander to the dangers of the mêlée and reduced his ability to control the wider battlefield.

Frederick's horse was killed or incapacitated and the emperor disappeared from the view of his followers. The precise details of the episode must be treated cautiously because the fullest papal narrative was written away from the battlefield and the motif of an enemy ruler being unhorsed was a familiar narrative device. The disappearance itself, however, was sufficiently consequential that contemporaries believed the emperor dead and his wife Beatrice was later said to have prepared mourning.

With the standard lost, the emperor invisible and the League pressing from several directions, imperial cohesion finally broke. Retreat became flight. Some survivors moved toward Como or Pavia; many others attempted to cross the Ticino. Men were killed during the pursuit, others drowned, and large numbers surrendered. The Comaschi contingent suffered especially heavily. Among the prisoners were major aristocrats, while the League captured imperial insignia, baggage, animals, precious goods and camp equipment.

Frederick escaped. The survival of the emperor prevented the battle from becoming a dynastic catastrophe and allowed the imperial political system to continue functioning. Nevertheless, the destruction or dispersal of a substantial part of the force he had assembled after considerable difficulty made an immediate renewed offensive impossible.

== Losses ==
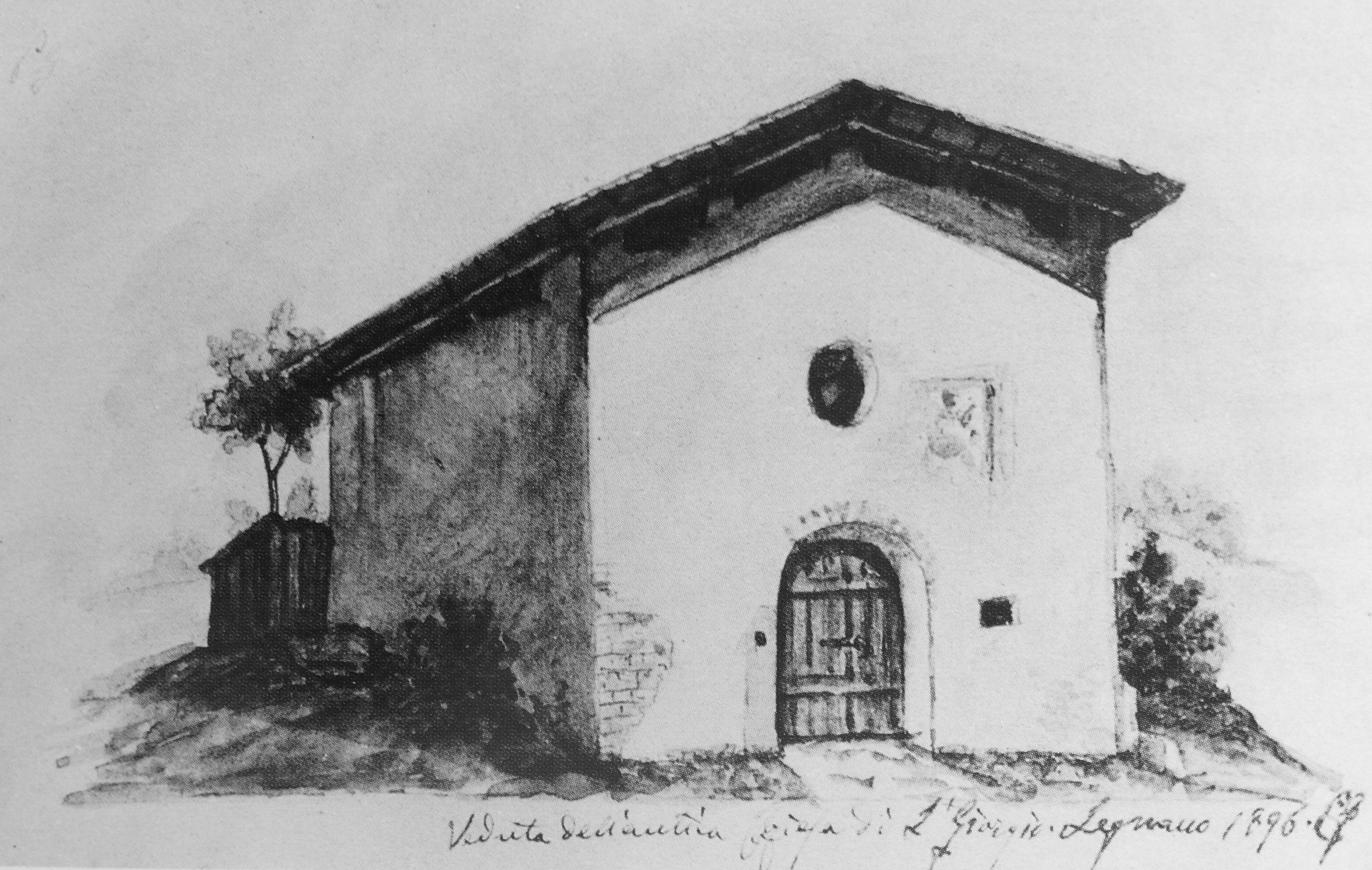
The former medieval church of San Giorgio in an 1892 watercolour by Giuseppe Pirovano

No contemporary source provides a secure numerical total for the casualties at Legnano. The surviving evidence nevertheless leaves little doubt about their asymmetry. League losses appear to have been comparatively limited, although they were not negligible: the communal cavalry suffered during the opening rout and the infantry endured repeated frontal attacks for several hours.

Imperial losses were substantially heavier. Contemporary accounts refer variously to large numbers killed, captured and drowned, while the Milanese victory letter emphasised that the numbers of dead, drowned and prisoners could not be calculated. The retreat toward the Ticino magnified battlefield losses because broken formations were pursued over a considerable distance. Numerous men surrendered rather than continue the flight, while others drowned attempting to cross the river.

The estimate of approximately 1,500–2,500 imperial killed, wounded or captured reflects the scale described by the sources rather than a transmitted medieval total. It is compatible with an army of roughly 3,000 cavalry in which a substantial body escaped but much of the remainder was killed, captured or dispersed. Several hundred deaths in combat are plausible, with additional fatalities during the pursuit and river crossing and a particularly large prisoner component.

The qualitative losses were almost as important as the numerical ones. Several prominent nobles were captured, the imperial standard and other insignia were lost, and the baggage train fell into League hands. The material, political and reputational damage therefore exceeded the number of battlefield deaths alone.

== Analysis ==
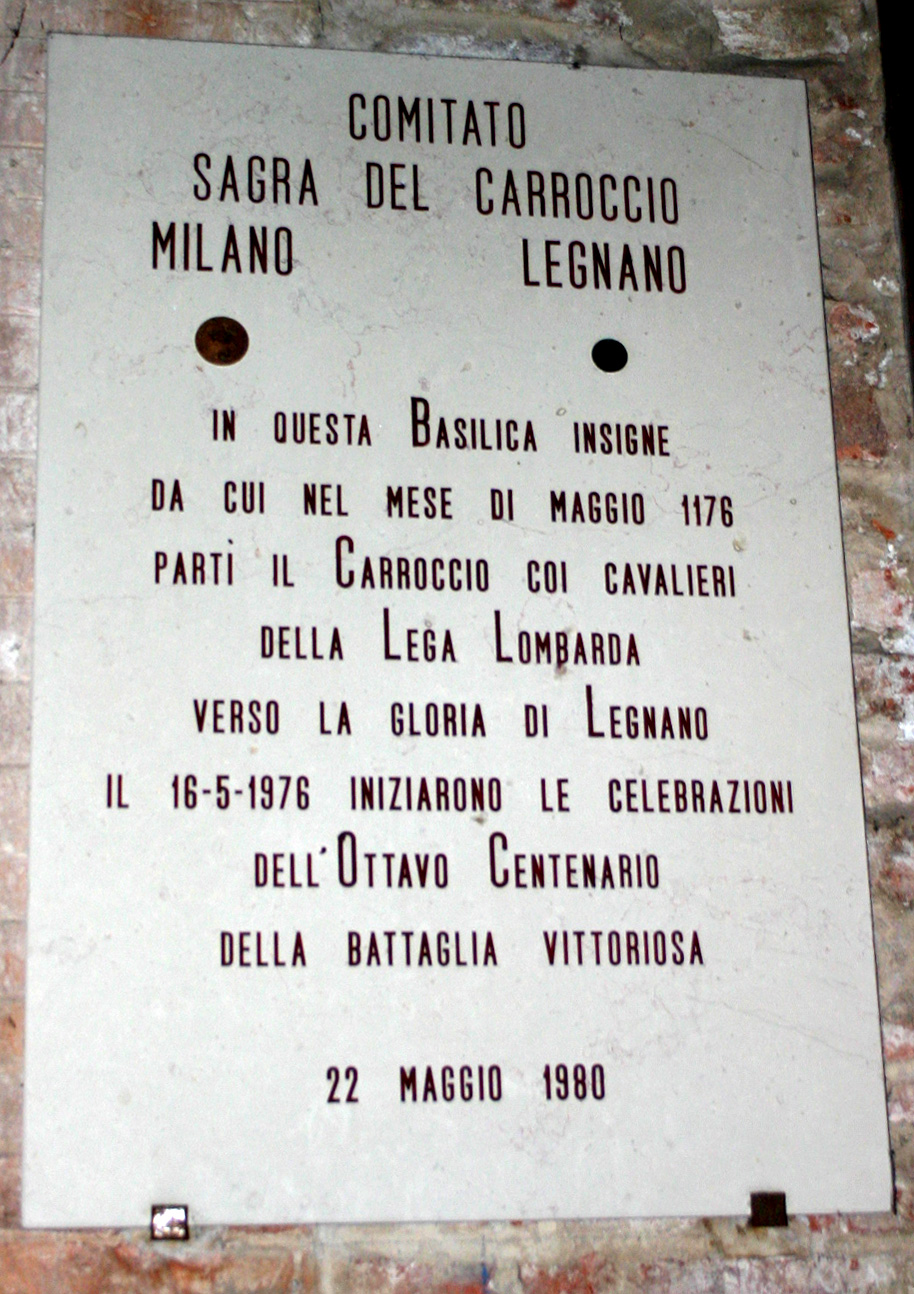
Plaque commemorating the departure of the carroccio from Milan

Legnano was one of the largest field engagements fought in western Europe during the twelfth century. Approximately 3,000 imperial heavy cavalry constituted an extraordinary concentration of mounted fighting power, while the League fielded perhaps a comparable number of cavalry alongside around 10,000–12,000 infantry. Armies of contemporary western monarchies frequently operated with considerably smaller bodies of heavy cavalry.

The battle is particularly important for understanding the relationship between cavalry and infantry. It was not evidence that cavalry had suddenly become obsolete. Frederick's mounted force performed extremely effectively in the opening phase and drove the League cavalry from the field. The eventual defeat arose because that success did not translate into the destruction of the infantry. Once a dense formation maintained cohesion, repeated cavalry attacks became increasingly expensive and exhausting. The later return of the League cavalry turned a difficult frontal engagement into a multi-directional crisis.

The League's performance was therefore operational as well as tactical. Its cities had mobilised a field army large enough to establish substantial numerical superiority, moved it into the correct theatre and positioned it so that Frederick could not reach Pavia without confronting it. This concentration was itself remarkable because the League remained a federation of politically independent communes whose members possessed their own rivalries and strategic interests. Legnano showed that those centrifugal pressures could temporarily be overcome when collective security was at stake.

The communal commanders also displayed considerable adaptability during the battle. The initial mounted detachment committed a serious error by pursuing the imperial vanguard into Frederick's main force and was punished severely. The army did not collapse with it. The infantry maintained its defensive centre, bought the cavalry time to regroup and then coordinated with the returning mounted troops in the final counterattack. The victory therefore emerged from recovery after an early tactical reverse rather than from an uninterrupted communal success.

Frederick's performance was correspondingly complex. His overall strategic situation before the battle was difficult. Reinforcements had arrived in smaller numbers than desired, the army was separated from the resources concentrated at Pavia, and hostile territory stood between the two. His attempt to move quickly from Como to Pavia was rational, as was the need to destroy or displace a League force blocking the route.

The opening engagement was handled effectively. Imperial scouts avoided destruction, drew the pursuing cavalry toward the main body and enabled Frederick to launch a successful countercharge. The central failure came afterward. The emperor could not convert cavalry superiority into a breakthrough against massed infantry, and repeated assaults progressively consumed the effectiveness of his small army. The decision to commit himself personally to the fighting demonstrated courage and fulfilled contemporary expectations of princely leadership, but his disappearance removed the army's most important political and visual focus at the worst possible moment.

The defeat nevertheless should not be understood as proof of general military incompetence. Frederick had previously conducted successful sieges, manoeuvres and field operations across Italy, and after Legnano he retained sufficient political and military authority to remain a central actor in the peninsula. The battle instead demonstrated a structural problem in the imperial method of warfare: German contingents were difficult to mobilise repeatedly for long Italian campaigns, while the communes could exploit local manpower, infrastructure, fortified cities and shorter lines of communication.

Legnano's deepest significance was political. Imperial authority did not disappear, but its feasible form changed. A system based on direct coercive enforcement of the Roncaglian programme had encountered an opponent capable of surviving repeated campaigns. The resulting settlement did not abolish imperial sovereignty; it redefined how that sovereignty operated. The communes obtained broad practical autonomy while continuing to exist formally within the Empire. In this sense Legnano helped produce not the destruction of imperial rule, but its transformation into a more negotiated and plural political order.

== Aftermath ==
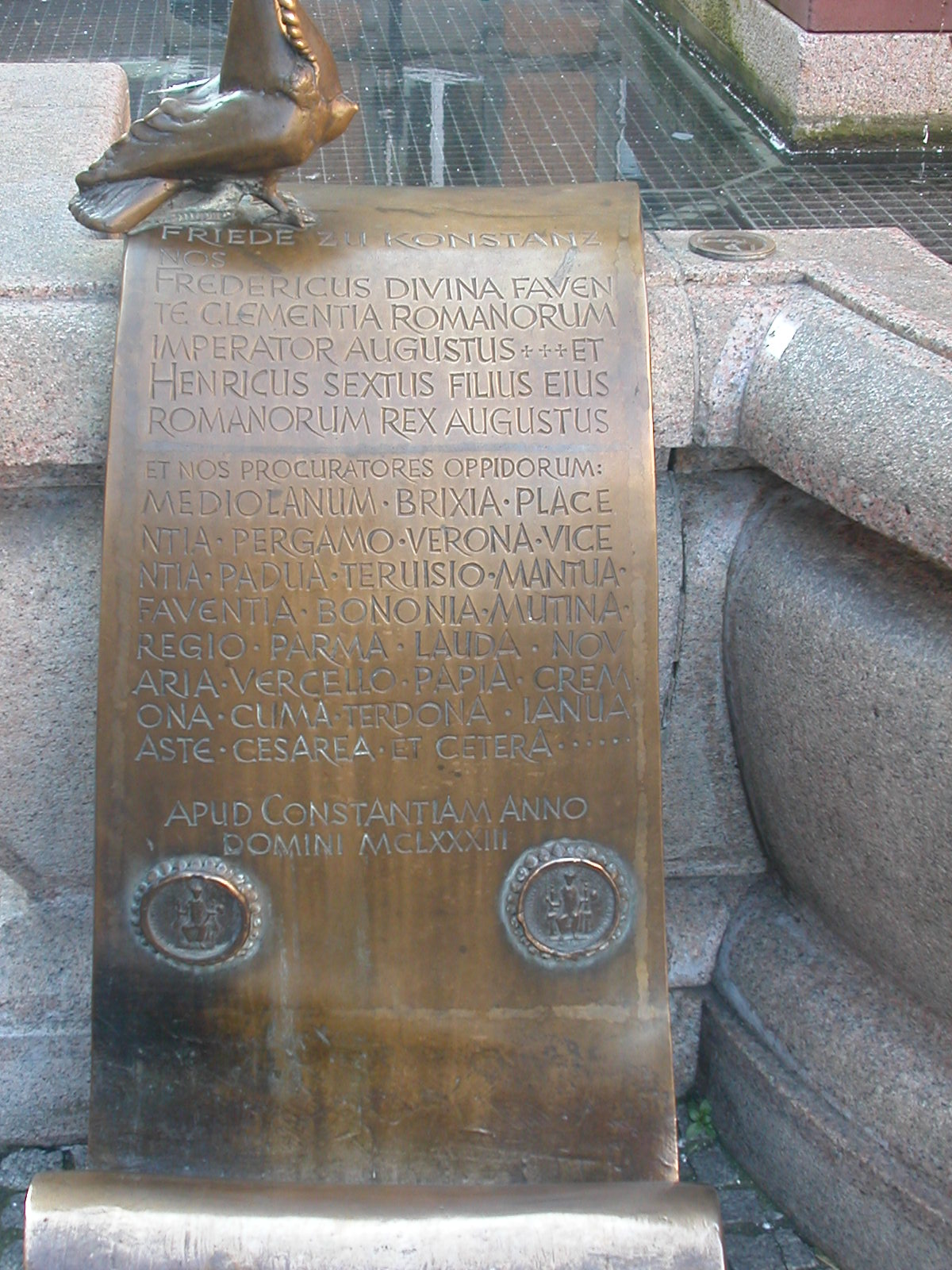
Commemoration of the Peace of Constance at Konstanz

The immediate imperial position after Legnano was severely damaged but not terminal. Frederick survived, Pavia remained loyal, and the institutional framework of imperial government continued to function. He was therefore neither deposed nor expelled from Italy. What had been lost was the field army on which an immediate military solution depended. Raising another comparable force from the German princes would have been politically difficult and strategically slow.

The defeat accelerated a transition already visible after Alessandria and Montebello from attempts at unilateral coercion toward negotiated settlement. Diplomatic contacts with Alexander III resumed in 1176 and culminated at the Peace of Venice in 1177. Frederick recognised Alexander as pope and the long schism was brought to an end. The emperor, papacy and League could not yet resolve every dispute over communal rights, so the cities received a six-year truce rather than an immediate definitive treaty.

This shift also displayed considerable political adaptability on Frederick's part. Defeat did not cause him simply to abandon Italy. He separated problems that could be settled from those that could not, restored relations with the papacy and preserved the dignity of his office through carefully negotiated ceremonial and legal forms. At Venice the reconciliation was staged in a manner that acknowledged papal legitimacy while avoiding the complete public humiliation of the emperor.

The final settlement with the communes followed in 1183. The Peace of Constance recognised the Lombard League and conceded extensive rights exercised by the communes, including important powers over local administration, fortification, justice and the selection of officials. The cities in return recognised the emperor as their formal sovereign and accepted defined obligations. The settlement therefore institutionalised a compromise between imperial universality and communal self-government rather than choosing one absolutely over the other. Alessandria itself illustrates the character of the compromise. The city whose existence had contributed so strongly to the crisis was eventually reconciled with Frederick and symbolically refounded under the name Caesarea before the Peace of Constance. The result allowed imperial honour to be preserved while the actual urban community survived.

The political order created after Constance proved more durable than the coercive arrangements of 1158–1162. Frederick later returned to northern Italy without an army and was ceremonially received in cities that had previously fought him, including Milan. Former enemies could therefore become imperial partners once the constitutional conflict had been reframed. Legnano consequently stands at the centre of a transformation rather than a simple imperial retreat. The emperor remained emperor, and the communes remained within the Empire, but the relationship between them had been altered by the demonstrated impossibility of restoring earlier expectations of direct rule through force alone.

== Alberto da Giussano and the Company of Death ==
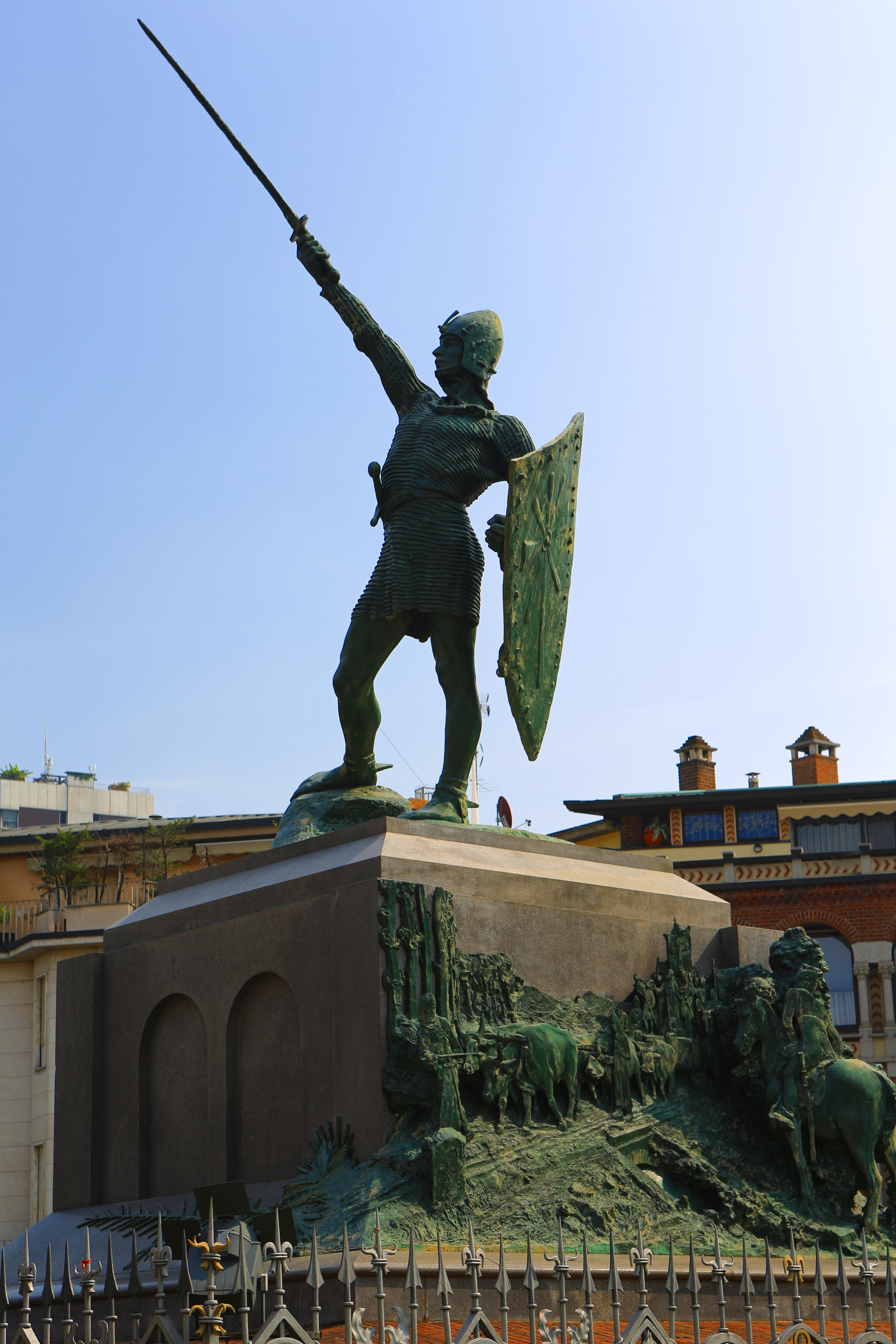
The Monument to the Warrior of Legnano, popularly associated with Alberto da Giussano

The figure of Alberto da Giussano does not belong to the contemporary evidence for the battle. He first appears in the writings of the fourteenth-century Milanese chronicler Galvano Fiamma, approximately a century and a half after Legnano. In this later narrative Alberto, accompanied by his brothers Ottone and Raniero, commands a heroic mounted brotherhood known as the Company of Death, whose members swear to defend the carroccio and fight to the death.

No contemporary chronicle of Legnano mentions Alberto, his brothers or such a company, despite the survival of multiple narratives from Milanese, papal and imperial perspectives. Nor does Alberto appear among the well-documented Milanese political and aristocratic elite of the later twelfth century. The supposed Company of Death is similarly absent from contemporary descriptions of the communal army.

The legend reflects the literary culture of the period in which it was created. By the fourteenth century heroic battlefield narratives centred increasingly upon named aristocratic warriors and organised companies of chosen knights. Retelling the communal victory through a single heroic commander made the story conform more closely to these expectations. It also supplied the League with a personal champion who could stand opposite the already monumental figure of Barbarossa.

The actual command structure appears to have been more collective. The contemporary sources do not name an overall League commander at Legnano. Guido da Landriano is the strongest candidate because he was simultaneously a leading Milanese political figure, an experienced cavalryman and a rector of the League. His prominence in later League diplomacy provides additional circumstantial support, but the identification remains an inference rather than a direct contemporary statement.

The legendary narrative became particularly powerful during the nineteenth century. Painters, poets and political writers transformed Alberto into a national hero, and the Company of Death became one of the most familiar images of Legnano. The enduring popularity of the story demonstrates how thoroughly the later cultural memory of the battle could diverge from the military structures recoverable from twelfth-century evidence.

== Memory of the battle ==
=== Risorgimento and national memory ===
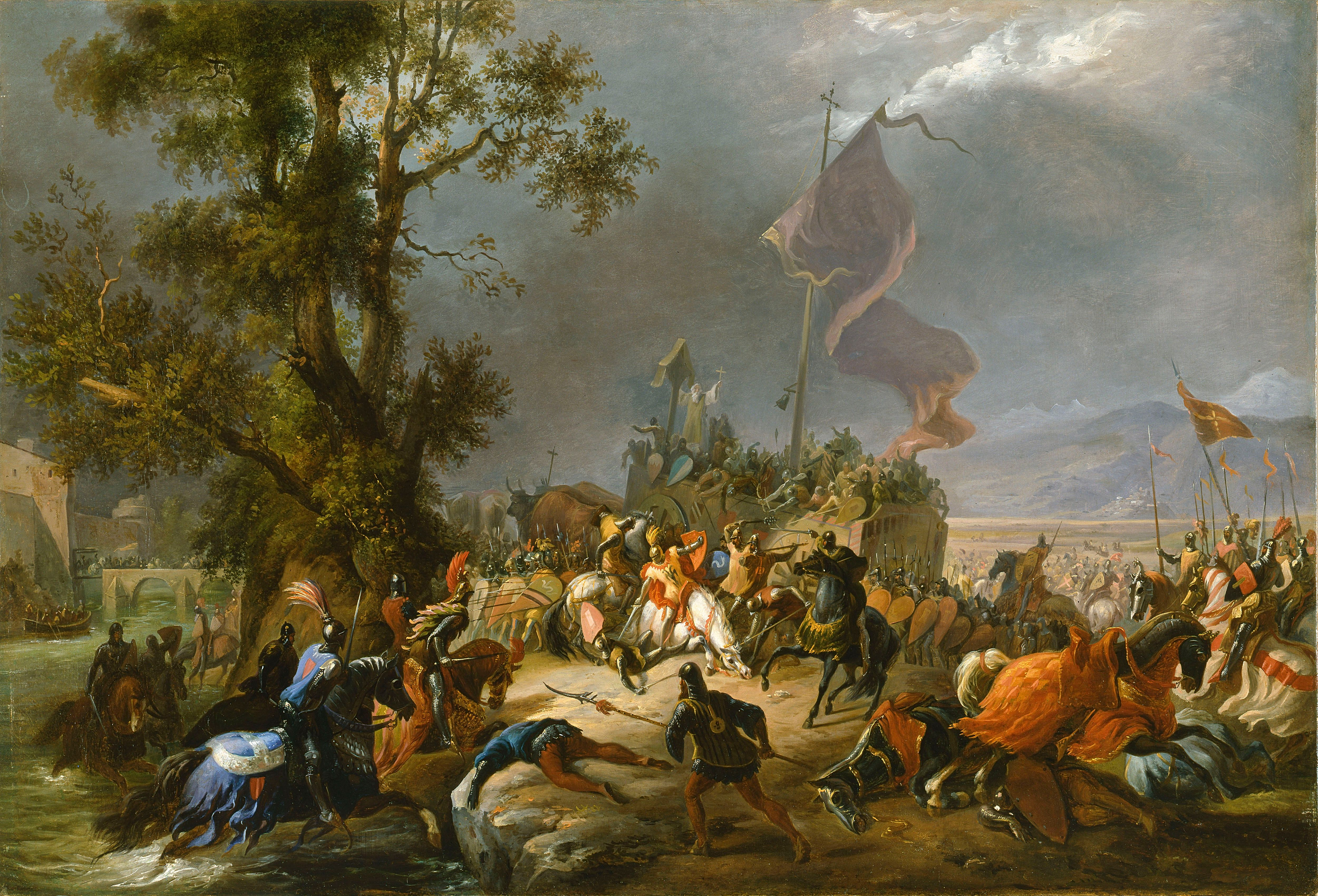
The Battle of Legnano by Massimo d'Azeglio, 1831

For centuries Legnano was remembered primarily through local, ecclesiastical and communal traditions. Its transformation into a major national symbol occurred during the Risorgimento, when nineteenth-century writers and artists reinterpreted medieval conflicts through the political concerns of their own age. The League's victory over an emperor of German origin could be recast as an anticipation of the struggle against Austrian rule, despite the profound differences between the political world of 1176 and that of the nineteenth century.

This reinterpretation simplified the medieval conflict. Pavia and Como had fought on Frederick's side, many of the emperor's supporters were Italian, and the League's communes were defending local liberties and political interests rather than a modern Italian nation-state. The participants understood themselves through civic, dynastic, imperial, ecclesiastical and regional identities that cannot be mapped directly onto nineteenth-century nationalism. Legnano nevertheless offered an exceptionally powerful historical image: autonomous Italian cities combining against overwhelming princely power and succeeding through collective action.

The battle entered literature, painting and political rhetoric. Massimo d'Azeglio, Amos Cassioli and other artists produced dramatic representations of the carroccio and the communal stand. Giuseppe Verdi's opera La battaglia di Legnano, premiered in Rome in 1849, transformed the episode into overtly patriotic theatre. The legendary Alberto da Giussano became increasingly prominent precisely because the national narrative benefited from a single heroic protagonist.

Giuseppe Garibaldi invoked Legnano in revolutionary rhetoric, and Goffredo Mameli incorporated it into Il Canto degli Italiani with the line traditionally translated as "From the Alps to Sicily, Legnano is everywhere." Legnano thereby became the only city besides Rome explicitly named in the Italian national anthem.

Celebrations in Legnano for the seven-hundredth anniversary of the battle in 1876

The physical commemoration of the battle likewise expanded. The seven-hundredth anniversary in 1876 generated major celebrations, and the present Monument to the Warrior of Legnano by Enrico Butti was inaugurated in 1900. Although the statue is routinely identified in popular culture as Alberto da Giussano, its inscription does not name the legendary commander.

=== Modern commemorations ===
The battle is commemorated annually by the Palio di Legnano, whose modern form dates from the twentieth century. Historical processions, civic ceremonies and the symbolic use of the carroccio preserve the battle as an element of local identity while also reflecting layers of later interpretation.

Its political symbolism has continued to evolve. In the late twentieth century the imagery of the carroccio and Alberto da Giussano was appropriated by the Lega Nord and its predecessor organisations, producing a political reading markedly different from Risorgimento nationalism but drawing upon the same reservoir of medieval imagery.

The persistence of these competing appropriations is itself part of Legnano's historical significance. The battle has functioned successively as communal memory, dynastic and ecclesiastical narrative, nineteenth-century national myth, local civic tradition and modern political symbol. The gap between the twelfth-century event and its later representations has consequently become an important subject in its own right.

The historical Legnano was more complex than the patriotic legend. It was fought by a multinational and politically heterogeneous imperial army against a coalition of mutually independent communes; the League possessed superior overall numbers; no contemporary evidence supports Alberto da Giussano or a Company of Death; and Frederick's defeat did not terminate the Empire's presence in Italy. Yet stripping away the legend does not diminish the battle. The ability of the communes to cooperate, mobilise and defeat an imperial field army was itself an exceptional political and military achievement, while Frederick's subsequent ability to turn military defeat into a negotiated constitutional settlement demonstrates the adaptability of imperial government. Legnano's historical importance therefore lies precisely in the complexity that later mythology often obscured.

== Sources and location of the battle ==
The battlefield cannot be reconstructed with absolute precision. Contemporary narratives use several forms of the name Legnano and nearby place-names, some distorted during manuscript transmission. Milanese and League sources generally place the fighting at or near Legnano, while later evidence associates parts of the engagement with Borsano and the approaches from Busto Arsizio.

The opening cavalry encounter probably occurred north of the principal infantry position, between Borsano and Busto Arsizio. The subsequent fighting shifted toward the League's main body and the carroccio. The exact position of the wagon remains disputed, with proposed sites including the San Martino area and the slopes nearer Costa San Giorgio.

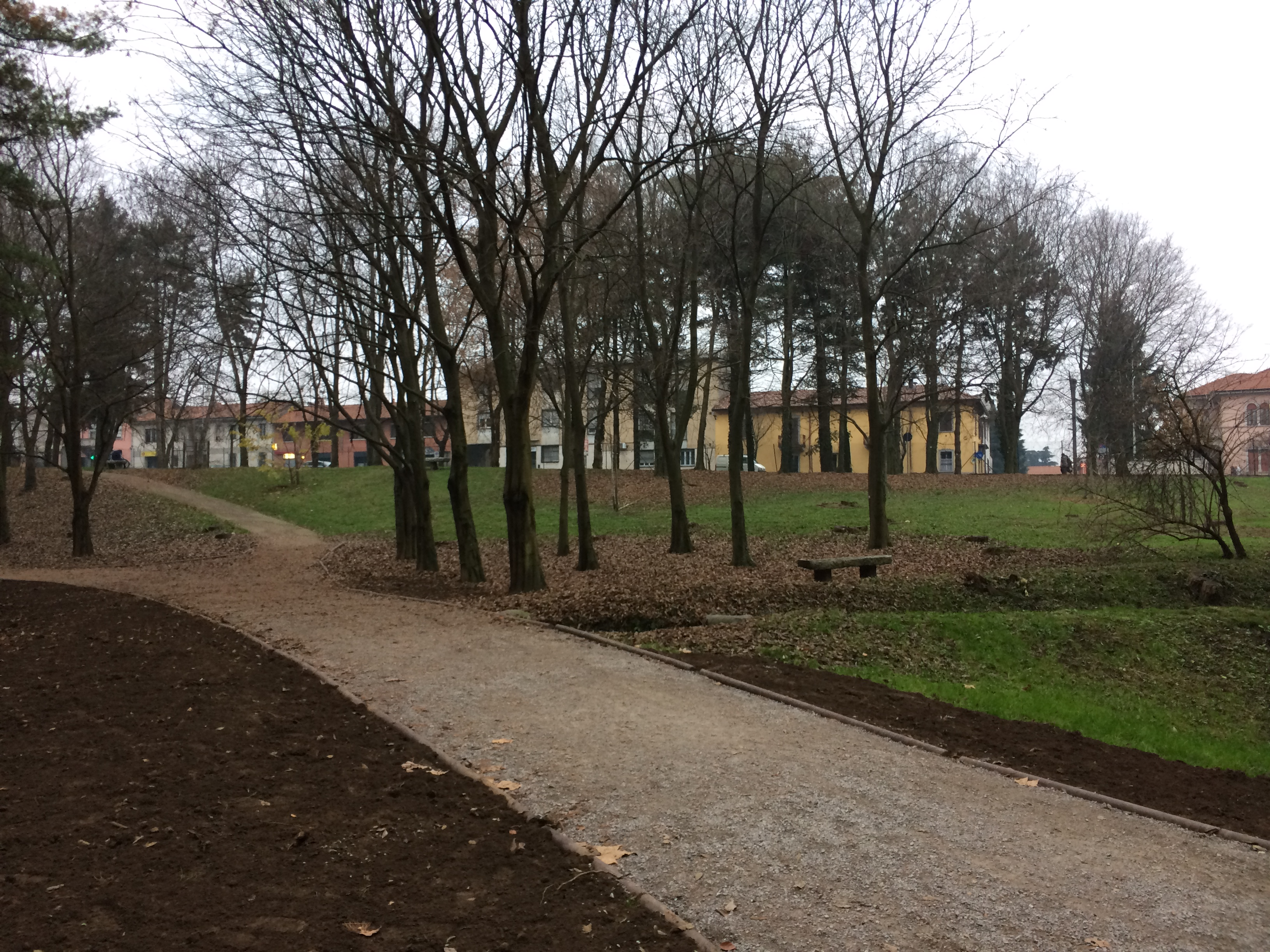
Landscape near one of the proposed areas of the battlefield

Topography mattered tactically. Woodland reduced visibility, the Olona and associated slopes channelled movement, and the road network influenced both Frederick's march toward Pavia and the League's attempt to block him. The surviving evidence is sufficient to establish the general operational geography but not to assign every stage of the battle to a precise modern location.

== Bibliography ==
- D'Ilario, Giorgio; Gianazza, Egidio; Marinoni, Augusto (1976). Legnano e la battaglia (in Italian). Legnano: Edizioni Landoni.
- D'Ilario, Giorgio; Gianazza, Egidio; Marinoni, Augusto; Turri, Marco (1984). Profilo storico della città di Legnano (in Italian). Legnano: Edizioni Landoni.
- Freed, John B. (2016). Frederick Barbarossa: The Prince and the Myth. New Haven: Yale University Press. ISBN 978-0-300-12276-3.
- Franke, Daniel P. (2021). "From Defeat to Victory in Northern Italy: Comparing Staufen Strategy and Operations at Legnano and Cortenuova, 1176–1237". Nuova Antologia Militare.
- Görich, Knut (2022). Friedrich Barbarossa: Der erste Stauferkaiser (in German). Munich: C.H. Beck. ISBN 978-3-406-78197-1.
- Grillo, Paolo (2018). Le guerre del Barbarossa: I comuni contro l'imperatore (in Italian). Rome-Bari: Laterza.
- Grillo, Paolo (2024). Legnano. Le grandi battaglie della storia (in Italian). Milan: Pelago / Out of Nowhere. ISBN 979-12-5501-257-3.
- Munz, Peter (1969). Frederick Barbarossa: A Study in Medieval Politics. London: Eyre & Spottiswoode.
- Percivaldi, Elena (2009). I Lombardi che fecero l'impresa: La Lega Lombarda e il Barbarossa tra storia e leggenda (in Italian). Ancora Editrice. ISBN 978-88-514-0647-9.
