= Egidio Pozzi =

Italian sculptor

Egidio Pozzi (Milan, 19th to 20th Century) was an Italian sculptor.

He was a resident of Milan, Among his works are: Busto muliebre; Bambino and Studio ili tesici. Among his portraits are Lord Byron meditating means to gain the liberty for Greece, exhibited in 1880 at Turin and in 1881 at Milan. Pozzi completed the initial Monument to Alberto da Giussano erected in 1876 at Legnano. His statue was replaced in 1900 by a more dynamic statue by Enrico Butti. Garibaldi in a speech to the townspeople had urged them to commemorate the legendary Lombard hero. In 1884, Pozzi designed a statue to honor Garibaldi in Pavia. He also designed the Ossuary and Monument to the Fallen during the Battle of May 20, 1859, located at the Cemetery of Montebello, Lombardy.
