= Roncaglia (surname) =

Roncaglia is a surname of Italian origin. People with that name include:

- Alessandro Roncaglia (born 1947), Italian economist
- Facundo Roncaglia (born 1987), Argentine football defender
- Luigi Roncaglia (born 1943), Italian cyclist

== See also ==
- Roncaglia (disambiguation)
