= Guido da Landriano =

- Guido da Landriano
- Born: Before 1159
- Died: After 1190
- Military career
- Allegiance: Lombard League
- Rank: Condottiero
- Conflicts: Guelphs and Ghibellines War; Battle of Legnano

Guido da Landriano, or Landriani (Italian pronunciation: [ˈɡwiːdo dа (l)lanˈdrjaːno, -driˈaːno]; before 1159 - after 1190), was an Italian condottiero and politician. He held the position of consul of the city of Milan and was the military leader of the troops of the Lombard League during the battle of Legnano (29 May 1176). Alberto da Giussano, who according to tradition, was in command of the Lombard League, is in fact a legendary figure.

== Biography ==
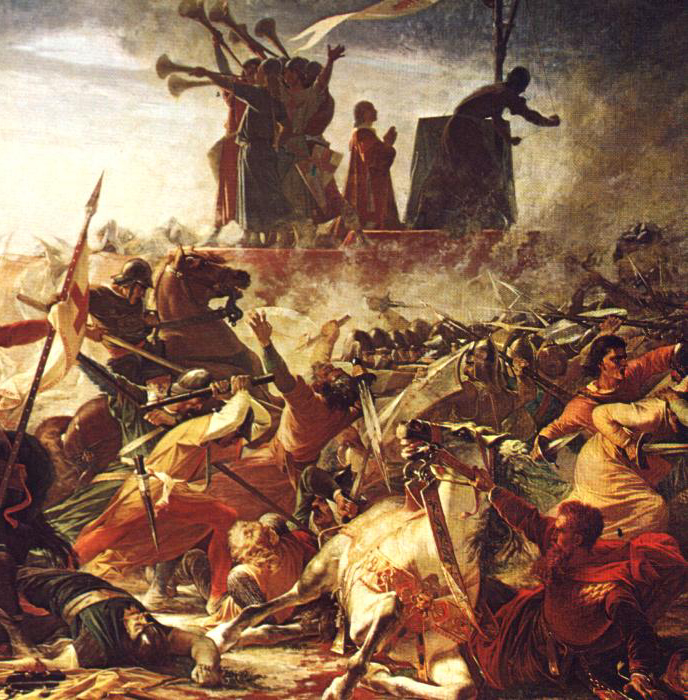
The defence of the Carroccio during the battle of Legnano (1176) by Amos Cassioli (1832–1891)

He belonged to the noble Milanese family of the "Landriani" (or "da Landriano"). The first historical document that mentions Guido da Landriano is dated 15 July 1159 and refers to the incarceration he suffered during the second descent in Italy of Frederick Barbarossa, when he held the post of Consul of Milan. After the battle of Siziano, Guido da Landriano was imprisoned in Pavia, a city allied to the German emperor.

A second mention of the Milanese consul is contained in a document dated 31 December 1167: in this act, the name of Guido da Landriano appears among those of the members of the Milanese council who signed the alliance treaty signed on 22 May between the cities of Milan, Lodi, Cremona, Brescia and Bergamo. A document dated January 1176 reports instead that the office of rector of the Lombard League was covered by Guido da Landriano.

Before the battle of Legnano it was decided to entrust the military command of the municipal armies to Guido da Landriano: the latter was, in addition to a shrewd politician, also an expert knight.

In 1179, he became podestà of Ferrara. In the document linked to the Piacenza negotiations (1183), which announced the peace of Constance (25 June 1183), the name of Guido da Landriano appears, among those of the municipal representatives, first. For the peace of Constance the embassies of the Italian cities were led by the consul and by Guido da Landriano.

Once the dispute with Barbarossa had been resolved, Guido da Landriano withdrew from the military sphere, continuing his political career, which ended in 1190 with the appointment as podestà of Asti.

== See also ==
- Alberto da Giussano
- Battle of Legnano
- Lombard League
