= Monument to the Warrior of Legnano =

Statue in Legnano, Italy

Coordinates: 45°35′41″N 8°54′43″E

- Monumento al Guerriero di Legnano
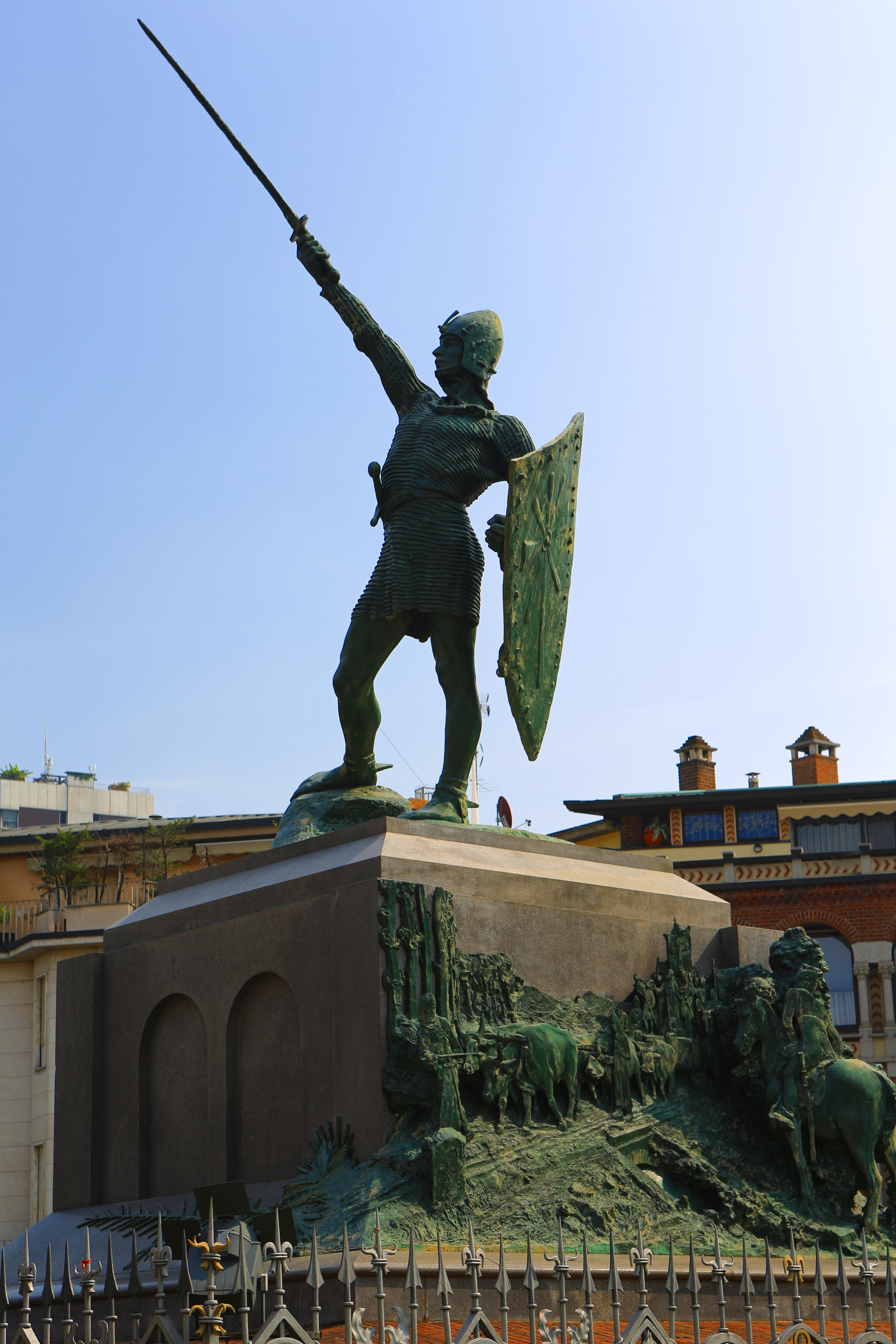
- Location: Monumento square, Legnano
- Designer: Enrico Butti
- Type: statue
- Material: bronze
- Beginning date: 1897
- Completion date: 1900

The monument to the Warrior of Legnano is a bronze statue dedicated to a combatant from the medieval battle of the same name. Located in Legnano, the statue depicts a soldier holding a shield in his left hand and a raised sword in his right to symbolize rejoicing at the end of the Battle of Legnano and the defeat of Frederick Barbarossa. Made by Enrico Butti, it was inaugurated on June 29, 1900.

== History ==
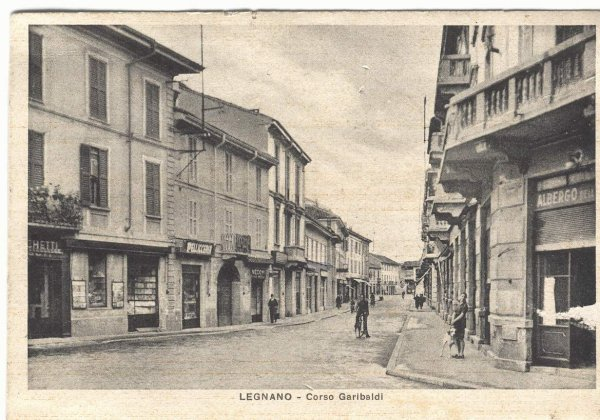
Corso Garibaldi towards Piazza San Magno in Legnano. On the left, there is a glimpse of the balcony from which Giuseppe Garibaldi spoke to the people of Legnano urging them to erect a monument commemorating the Battle of Legnano, later demolished along with the building.

It was built following a speech delivered by Giuseppe Garibaldi on June 16, 1862, during his visit to Legnano at the invitation of Mayor Andrea Bossi. In this speech, the Hero of Two Worlds urged the people of Legnano to erect a monument to commemorate the battle of May 29, 1176, where the communes of the Lombard League defeated Frederick Barbarossa's imperial army. Garibaldi spoke from a balcony of a no longer existing building that stood on the corner of Corso Garibaldi and Via Crispi: in its place now stands the back of the Banca di Legnano headquarters. To commemorate the event, a commemorative plaque has been placed on the perimeter wall of the building housing the bank. In Legnano, Garibaldi uttered these words:

[...] We care little for the memories of patriotic events; Legnano lacks a monument to ascertain the valor of our ancestors and the memory of our connected fathers, who succeeded in thrashing foreigners as soon as they were understood. [...]

— Giuseppe Garibaldi

The Battle of Legnano was rediscovered during the Risorgimento when the desire to drive the Austrians off national land with the ultimate goal of unifying Italy was born. In this historical context, the Battle of Legnano rose to symbolize the Italians' then-victorious struggle against foreign rule. Later, more careful historical examinations led to the conclusion that the municipalities of the Lombard League involved in the struggle against Barbarossa were not driven by patriotic ferments but had only one goal, that of obtaining greater autonomy from the Holy Roman Empire.

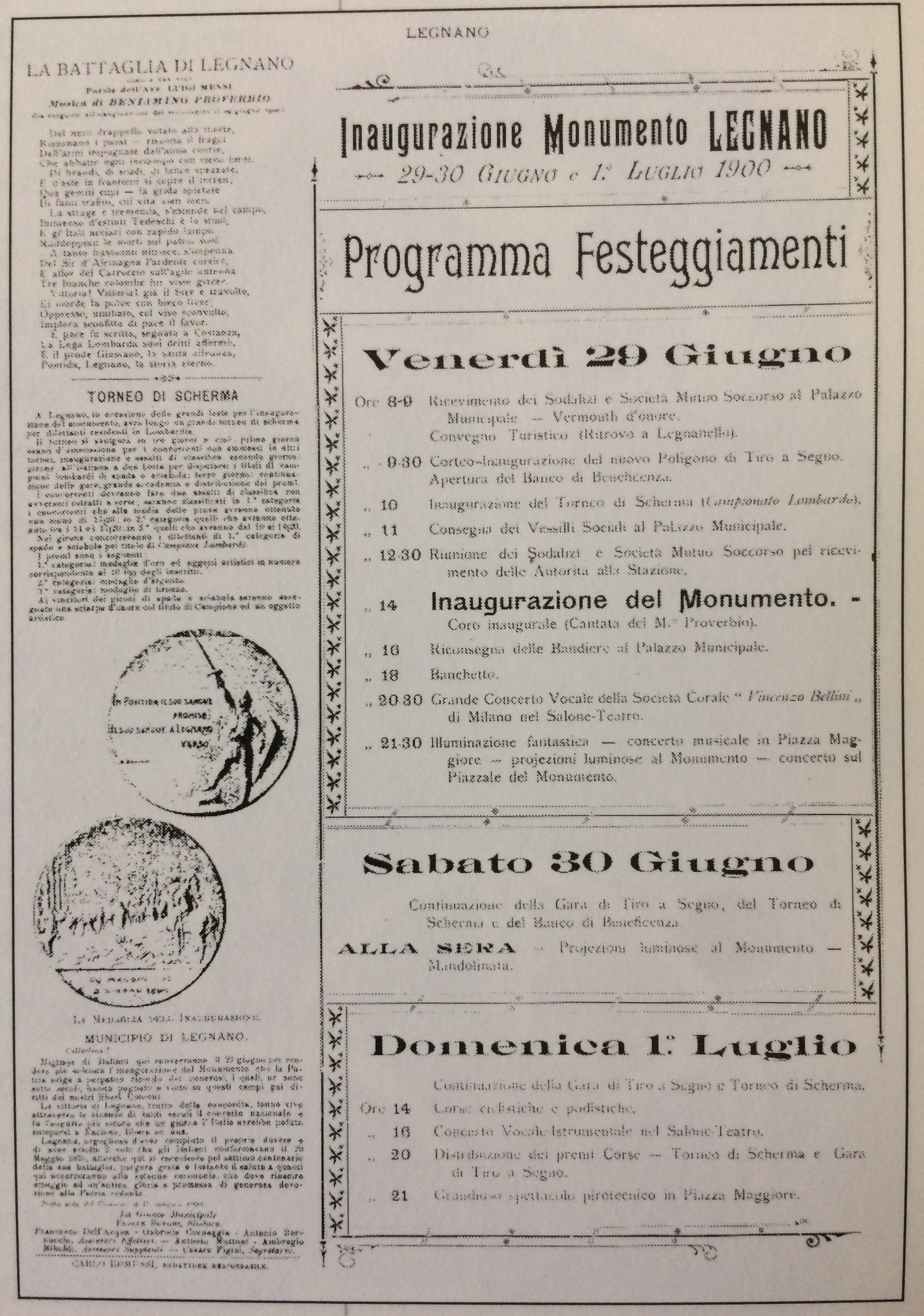
Poster of the inauguration of the second monument to the Warrior of Legnano (June 29, 1900).

On May 24, 1876, on the occasion of the 700th anniversary of the battle, the Milan Archaeological Society and the municipality of Legnano, stimulated by Garibaldi's speech, inaugurated in Legnano, in memory of the famous medieval clash, a first statue made by sculptor Egidio Pozzi.

To raise the necessary funds, a national subscription was opened, which yielded the hoped-for result, while sculptor Egidio Pozzi and architect Achille Sfondrini (the latter to design the plinth) were approached to create the work.

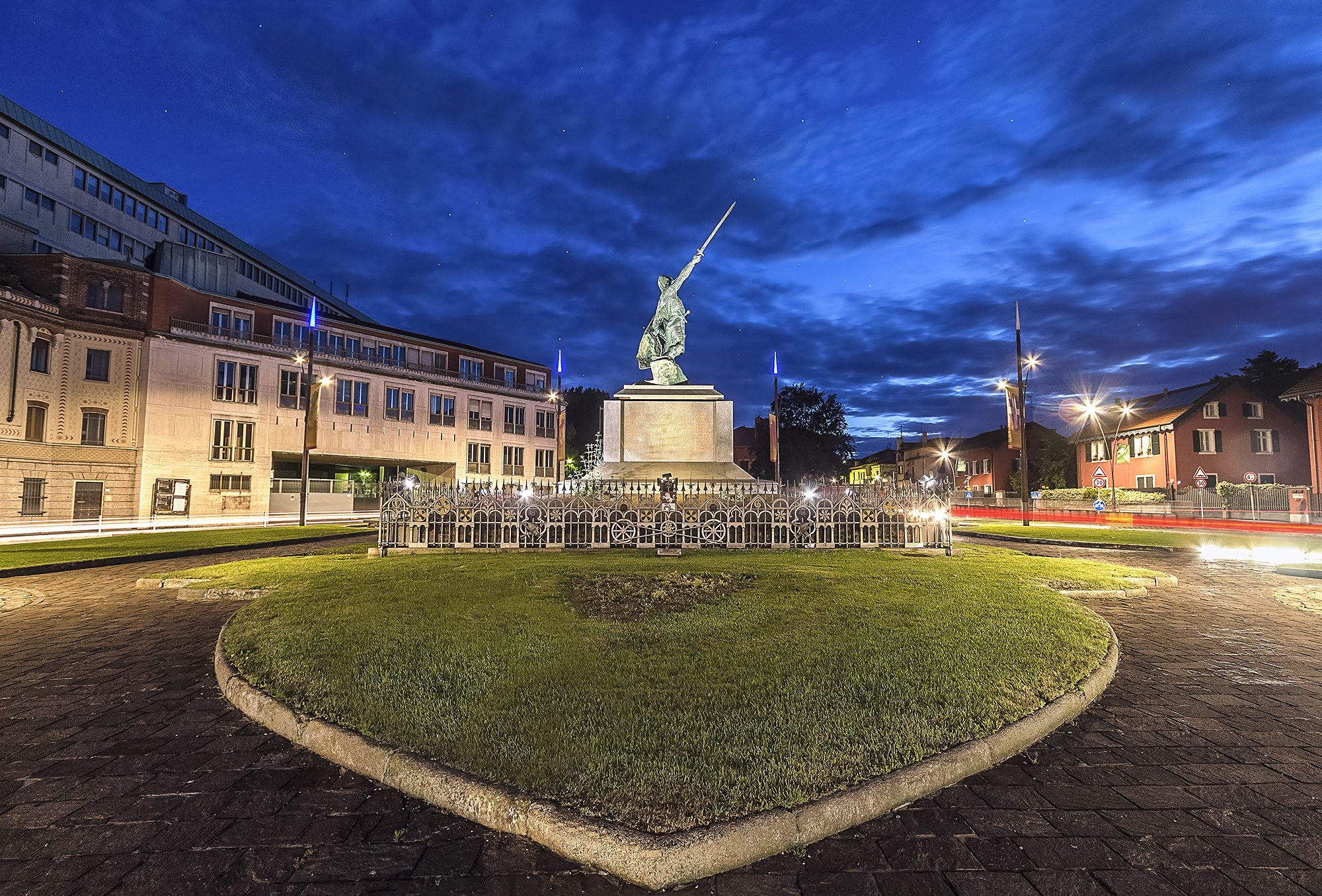
Monumento square in Legnano.

The creation of the sculpture was difficult, however, as the people of Milan requested to build the monument in their city, which was later denied. Because of the delay, only the base was built for May 24, 1876, the day scheduled for the inauguration. In order not to further delay the celebration, the statue was made of papier-mâché and plaster, materials that did not allow the sculpture to withstand the weather.

The first monument to the Warrior of Legnano melted at the first atmospheric precipitation and was replaced in 1900 by the current one, which is by Enrico Butti, then a professor at the Brera Academy. Butti, who was commissioned in 1895, first showed the model of the work to the public at the 1897 Milan Triennial.

The second statue dedicated to the Warrior of Legnano was unveiled on June 29, 1900. The festivities, which lasted for three days, from June 29 to July 1, included several side events, including an official reception, a tourist convention, the inauguration ceremony of the new firing range, a charity stand, a fencing tournament, bicycle and running races, and fireworks in Piazza San Magno, then called Piazza Maggiore. A commemorative medal was also minted and a musical composition was written, melody by Beniamino Proverbio and lyrics by Luigi Mensi, recalling the famous battle.

== Construction ==
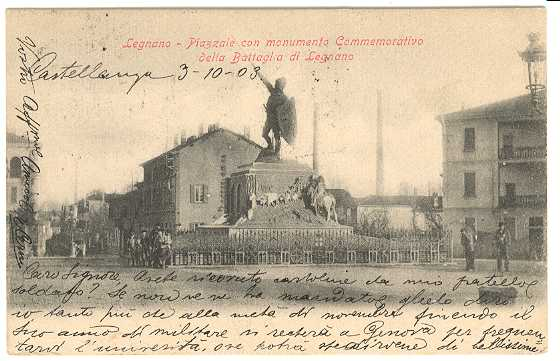
The monument in 1903.

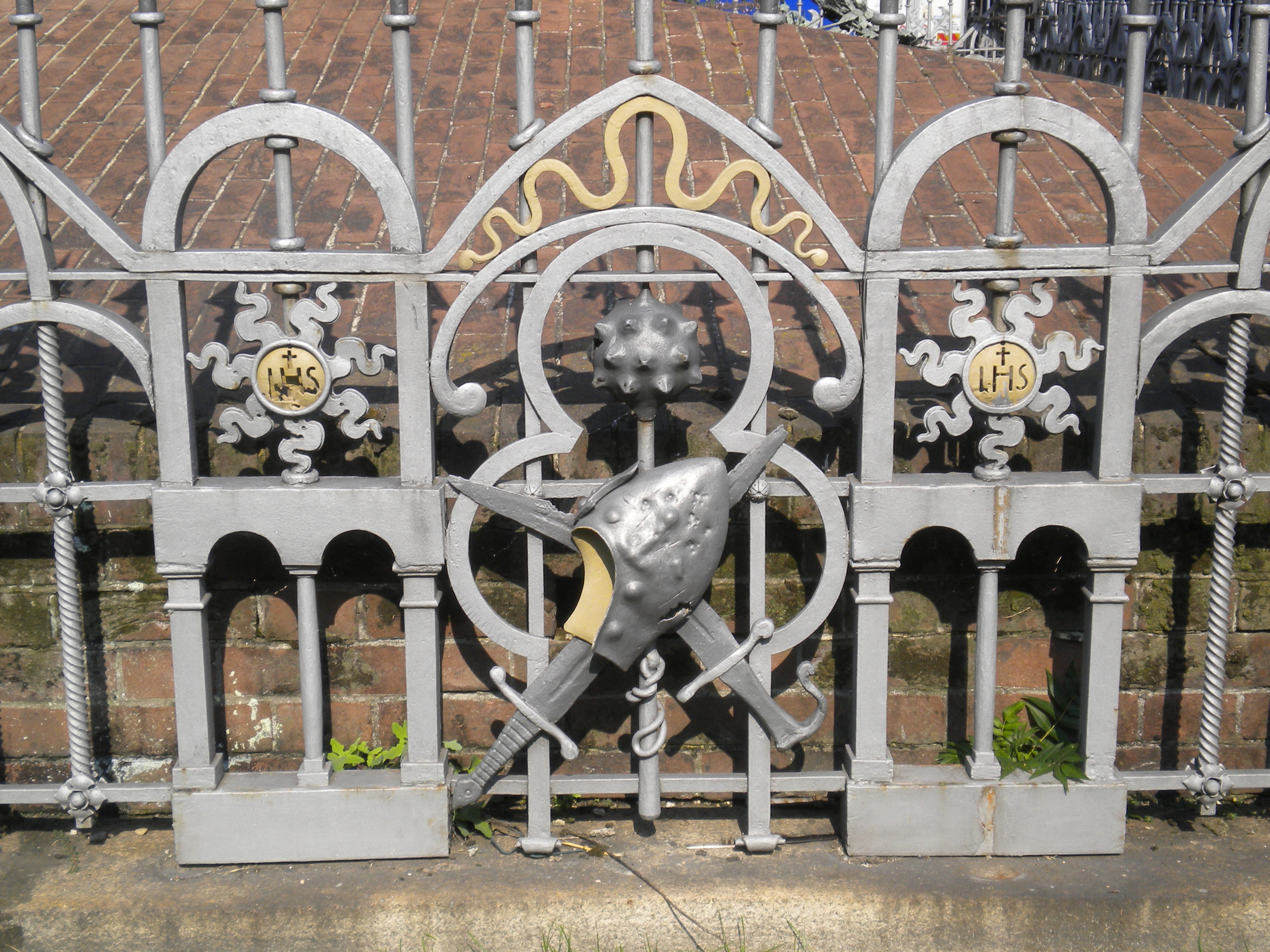
Detail of the gate enclosing the monument.

It stands in the Monumento Square, near the city's train station. The statue depicts a soldier with a shield in his left hand and a sword raised in his right to symbolize rejoicing at the end of the Battle of Legnano and the defeat of Frederick Barbarossa.

The Warrior is stretched upward, with this vertical projection being accentuated by the overall shape of the work, which is an elongated triangular form. This momentum is sharpened by an imaginary vertical line extending from the left leg, which points rigidly at the ground, to the sword extended upward. The overall shape of the statue is then completed by another line, this time oblique, joining the shield with the right leg; the latter rests - unlike the left leg - slightly bent pointing at an outcrop of rock emerging from the ground.

The plinth is made of gray granite. On the front side of the plinth is depicted the Porta Romana, from which the Milanese exited with the chariot headed for Legnano in anticipation of the clash with Barbarossa. On the left side, on the other hand, is a list of the cities associated with the Lombard League, while the other two surfaces depict some phases of the Battle of Legnano. The monument is then enclosed by a wrought-iron gate.

== Iconography ==
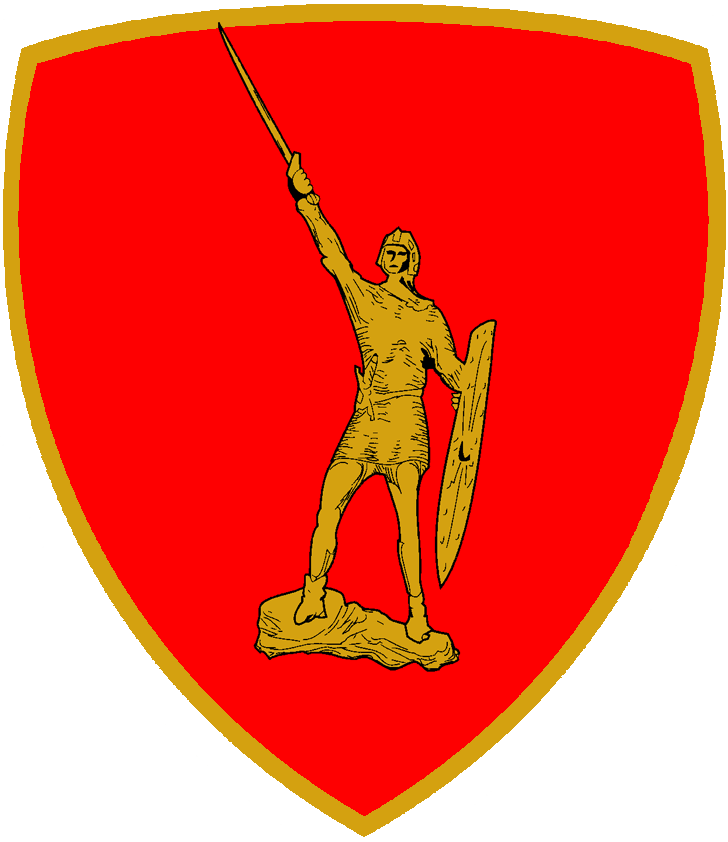
Coat of arms of the mechanized brigade “Legnano”.

The iconography of the monument was later used as a logo by:

- Military units:
  - Cruiser Alberto di Giussano of the Regia Marina (1931-1941)
  - 58th Infantry Division “Legnano” of the Royal Italian Army (1934-1943)
  - Italian Liberation Corps of the Royal Italian Army (1944)
  - “Legnano” combat group of the Royal Italian Army (1944-1945)
  - Infantry Division “Legnano” of the Royal Italian Army and later the Italian Army (1945-1975)
  - Mechanized Brigade “Legnano” of the Italian Army (1975-1996)
  - “Legnano” Support Unit Command of the Italian Army (1996-1997)
- Companies:
  - Legnano Bicycles (1927-current)
- Sports clubs:
  - AC Legnano (1913-2012 and 2015-current)
  - Associazione Sportiva Dilettantistica Legnano 1913 Calcio (2013-2015)
  - Legnano cycling team (1927-1966)
- Political parties:
  - Lombard Regional Autonomist Movement (1958-early 1960s)
  - Lega Lombarda (1982-1991), then
  - Lega Nord (1991-1995), then
  - Lega Nord - Federal Italy (1995-1997), then
  - Lega Nord (1997-2017)
  - Lega (2017-current)

== See also ==
- Legnano
- Battle of Legnano
- Cruiser Alberto di Giussano
- 58th Infantry Division “Legnano”
- Mechanized Brigade “Legnano”

== Bibliography ==
- Il Palio di Legnano. Sagra del Carroccio e Palio delle Contrade nella storia e nella vita della città [The Palio of Legnano. Sagra del Carroccio and Palio delle Contrade in the history and life of the city.] (in Italian). Legnano: Banca di Legnano. 1998.
- Ferrarini, Gabriella; Stadiotti, Marco (2001). Legnano. Una città, la sua storia, la sua anima [Legnano. A city, its history, its soul.] (in Italian). Telesio editore.
- D'Ilario, Giorgio; Gianazza, Egidio; Marinoni, Augusto; Turri, Marco (1984). Profilo storico della città di Legnano [Historical profile of the city of Legnano] (in Italian). Edizioni Landoni.
- Grillo, Paolo (2010). Legnano 1176. Una battaglia per la libertà [Legnano 1176. A battle for freedom] (in Italian). Bari-Roma: Laterza. ISBN 978-88-420-9243-8.
