= The Battle of Legnano (painting) =

Painting by Massimo d'Azeglio

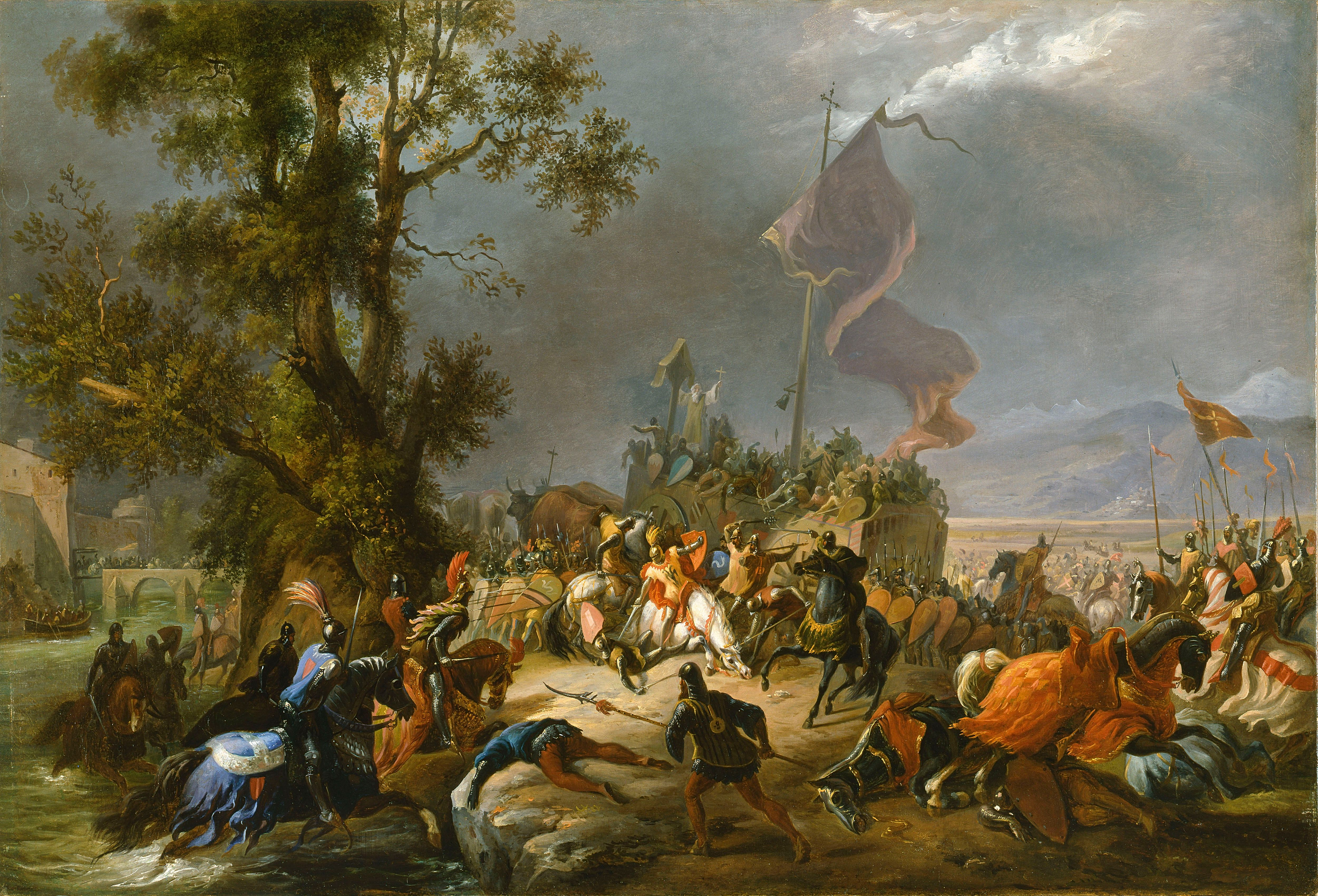
- Artist: Massimo d'Azeglio
- Year: 1831
- Medium: Oil on canvas
- Dimensions: 135 cm × 197 cm (53 in × 78 in)
- Location: Museum of Santa Giulia, Brescia

The Battle of Legnano (Italian: La battaglia di Legnano) is an 1831 history painting by the Italian artist Massimo d'Azeglio. It depicts the Battle of Legnano in 1176 when the Lombard League defeated the forces of the Holy Roman Empire led by Frederick Barbarossa. Romantic in style, the painting is a heroic commemoration of the medieval victory that was celebrated by modern advocates of Italian Unification. The picture focuses on particular on the Lombardian defence of the Carroccio. It featured at the annual exhibition held at the Brera Academy in Milan in 1831. Today the painting is in the Museum of Santa Giulia in Brescia, although several replicas by the artist exist. Amos Cassioli also produced a notable painting based on the battle in 1860.

== Bibliography ==
- Gribling, Barbara & Stevenson, Katie (ed.) Chivalry and the Medieval Past. Boydell Press, 2016.
- Marshall, Ronald. Massimo D'Azeglio: An Artist in Politics, 1798–1866. Oxford University Press, 1966.
- Olson, Roberta. Ottocento: Romanticism and Revolution in 19th-century Italian Painting American Federation of Arts, 1992.
