= Roncaglia =

Roncaglia may refer to:

- Roncaglia (surname), a surname of Italian origin

== Places ==
- Roncaglia (Piacenza), a frazione of Piacenza, Italy
- Roncaglia, a frazione of Casale Monferrato, Italy
- Roncaglia, a frazione of Ponte San Nicolò, Italy
- Roncaglia, a frazione of San Giovanni Bianco, Italy
- Roncaglia, a frazione of Roletto, Italy

== Other uses ==
- Diet of Roncaglia, held in 1158 near Piacenza, a general assembly of the nobles and ecclesiasts of the Holy Roman Empire
