= Northern Italy =

Geographic and cultural region

Northern Italy Italia Settentrionale (Italian) Nord Italia (Italian) Alta Italia (Italian)
- Country: Italy
- Largest city: Milan
- Regions: List: Aosta Valley; Emilia-Romagna; Friuli-Venezia Giulia; Liguria; Lombardy; Piedmont; Veneto; Trentino-Alto Adige/Südtirol

Area
  - Total: 120,312.72 km^{2} (46,453.00 sq mi)

Population (2026)
  - Total: 27,574,025
  - Density: 229.18628/km^{2} (593.58975/sq mi)
- Languages
  - Official language: Italian
  - Official linguistic minorities: Franco-Provençal; French; Friulian; German; Ladin; Occitan; Slovene
  - Regional languages: Emilian-Romagnol; Ligurian; Lombard; Piedmontese; Venetian

Northern Italy (Italian: Italia Settentrionale, Nord Italia, Alta Italia) is a geographical and cultural region in the northern part of Italy. The Italian National Institute of Statistics defines the region as encompassing the four northwestern regions of Piedmont, Aosta Valley, Liguria and Lombardy in addition to the four northeastern regions of Trentino-Alto Adige/Südtirol, Veneto, Friuli-Venezia Giulia and Emilia-Romagna.

With a population of 27.5 million in an area of 120,312.72 km^{2} (46,453.00 mi^{2}) as of 2026, the region covers 39.8% of Italy and contains 46.8% of its population. Two of Italy's largest metropolitan areas, Milan and Turin, are located in the region. Northern Italy's GDP was estimated at €1 trillion in 2021, accounting for 56.5% of the Italian economy.

Northern Italy has a rich and distinct culture. Thirty-seven of the fifty-nine World Heritage Sites in Italy are found in the region. Rhaeto-Romance and Gallo-Italic languages are spoken in the region, as opposed to the Italo-Dalmatian languages spoken in the rest of Italy. The Venetian language is sometimes considered to be part of the Italo-Dalmatian languages, but some major publications such as Ethnologue (to which UNESCO refers on its page about endangered languages) and Glottolog define it as Gallo-Italic.

== Definition and toponymy ==
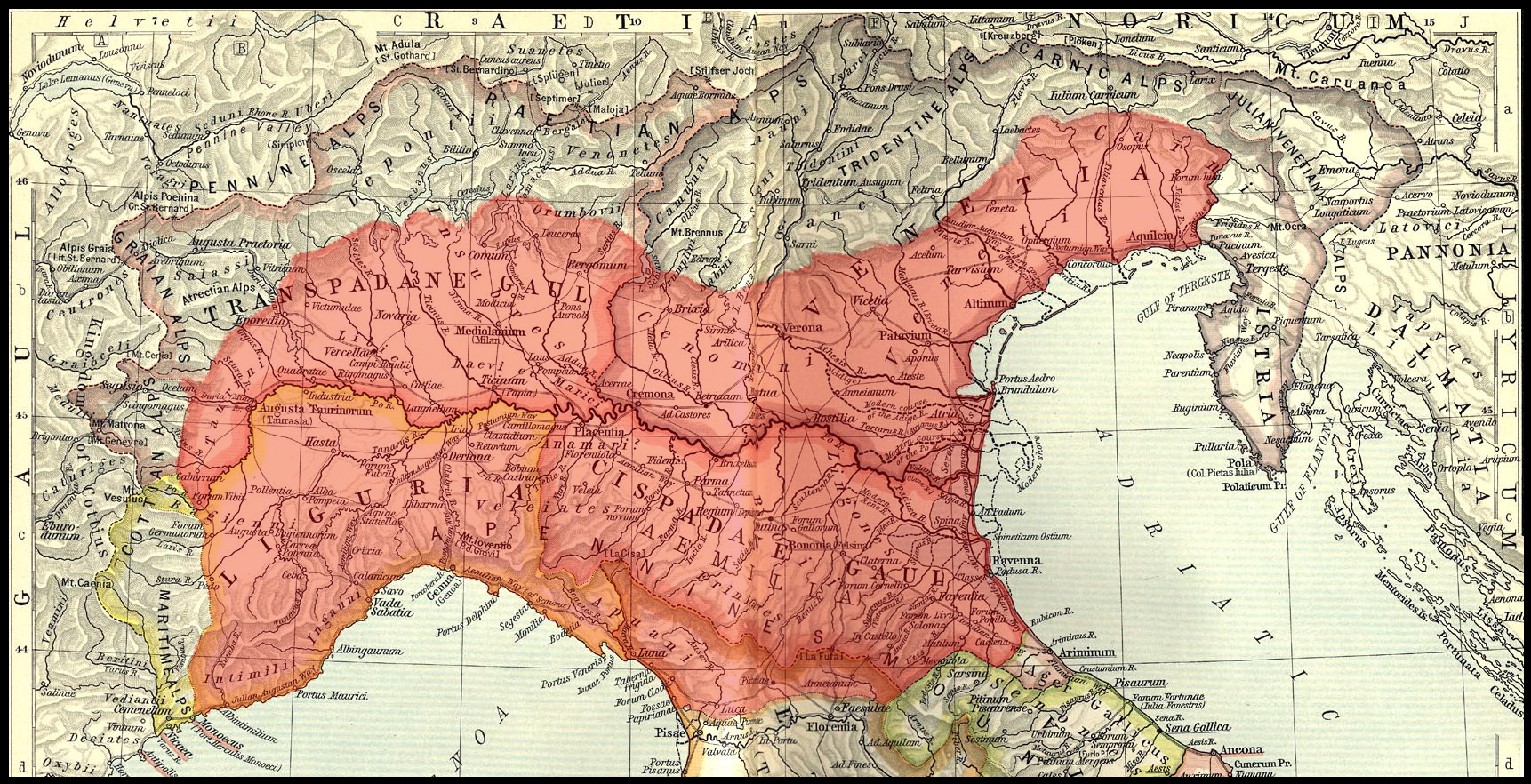
Territories of Cisalpine Gaul around 100 BC, before the Roman expansion in Italy

Northern Italy was called by different terms in different periods of history. During ancient times the terms Cisalpine Gaul, Gallia Citerior or Gallia Togata were used to define that part of Italy inhabited by Celts (Gauls) between the 4th and 3rd century BC. Conquered by the Roman Republic in the 220s BC, it was a Roman province from c. 81 BC until 42 BC, when it was merged into Roman Italy. Until that time, it was considered part of Gaul, precisely that part of Gaul on the "hither side of the Alps" (from the perspective of the Romans), as opposed to Transalpine Gaul ("on the far side of the Alps").

After the fall of the Roman Empire and the settlement of the Lombards the name Langobardia Maior was used, in the early Middle Ages, to define the domains of the Lombard Kingdom in northern Italy with capital Pavia. The Lombard territories beyond were called Langobardia Minor, consisting of the duchies of Spoleto and Benevento.

During the late Middle Ages, after the fall of the northern part of the Lombard Kingdom to Charlemagne, the term Longobardia was used to mean northern Italy within the medieval Kingdom of Italy. As the area became partitioned into regional states, the term Lombardy subsequently shifted to indicate only the area of the Duchies of Milan, Mantua, Parma and Modena and later only to the area around Milan.

More recently, the term Alta Italia (Italian for 'High Italy') became widely used, for such by the Comitato di Liberazione Nazionale Alta Italia during the Second World War. In the 1960s, the term Padania began to be sometimes used as a geographical synonym of the Po Valley. The term appeared sparingly until the early 1990s, when Lega Nord, then a secessionist political party, proposed Padania as a possible name for an independent state in northern Italy, giving the term a strong political connotation.

For statistical purposes, the Italian National Institute of Statistics uses the terms northwest Italy and northeast Italy for two of Italy's five statistical regions in its reporting. These same subdivisions are used to demarcate first-level Nomenclature of Territorial Units for Statistics (NUTS) regions ("NUTS 1 regions") within the European Union, and the Italian constituencies for the European Parliament.

== History ==
=== Antiquity and Early Middle Ages ===
Ancient peoples of northern Italy, with Celtic peoples shown in blue

In pre-Roman centuries it was inhabited by different peoples among whom the Ligures, the ancient Veneti, who prospered through their trade in amber and breeding of horses, the Etruscans, attested in northern Italy at least since the early Iron Age during the Villanova period, founded the city of Bologna and spread the use of writing; later, starting from the 5th century BC, the area was invaded by Celtic – Gallic tribes. These people founded several cities like Turin and Milan and extended their rule from the Alps to the Adriatic Sea. Their development was halted by the Roman expansion in the Po Valley from the 3rd century BC onwards. After centuries of struggle, probably officially around 81 BC, the entire area of what is now northern Italy became a Roman province with the name of Gallia Cisalpina ("Gaul on the inner side (with respect to Rome) of the Alps").

In 49 BC, with the Lex Roscia, Julius Caesar granted to the populations of the province full Roman citizenship. The Rubicon River marked its southern boundary with Italia proper. By crossing this river in 49 BC with his loyal XIII Legion, returning from the conquest of Gaul, Julius Caesar precipitated the civil war within the Roman Republic which led, eventually, to the establishment of the Roman Empire. To this day the term "crossing the Rubicon" means, figuratively, "reaching the point of no return". In late antiquity, the strategic role of northern Italy was emphasized by the moving of the capital of the Western Empire from Rome to Mediolanum in 286 and later to Ravenna from 402 until the empire collapsed in 476.

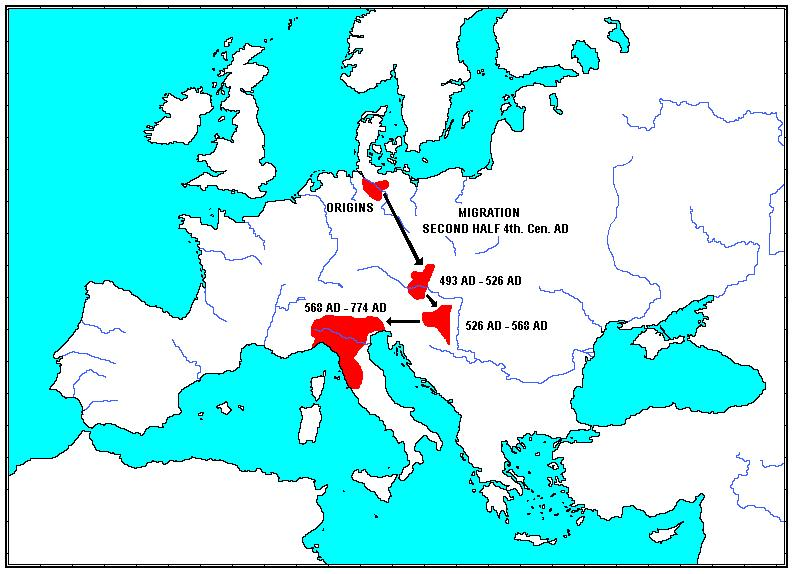
Migration of the Lombards towards northern Italy

After the fall of the Western Empire, northern Italy suffered heavily from destruction brought about by migration from Germanic peoples. In 493 the Ostrogoths managed to create a stable and prosperous kingdom, with its capital first in Ravenna and then in Pavia, but the Gothic War caused the kingdom to fall and devastated the region. In the 570s the Germanic Lombards, or Longobardi, entered northern Italy from Friuli and founded a long-lasting reign (with its capital in Pavia) that gave the medieval name to the whole northern Italy and the current name to the Lombardy region. After the initial struggles, relationships between the Lombard people and the Latin-speaking people improved. In the end, the Lombard language and culture assimilated with the Latin culture, leaving evidence in many names, the legal code and laws, and other things. The end of Lombard rule came in 774, when the Frankish king Charlemagne conquered Pavia, deposed Desiderius, the last Lombard king, and annexed the Lombard Kingdom to his empire changing the name in Kingdom of Italy. The former Lombard dukes were mostly replaced by Frankish counts, prince-bishops or marquises.

=== High Middle Ages and Renaissance ===
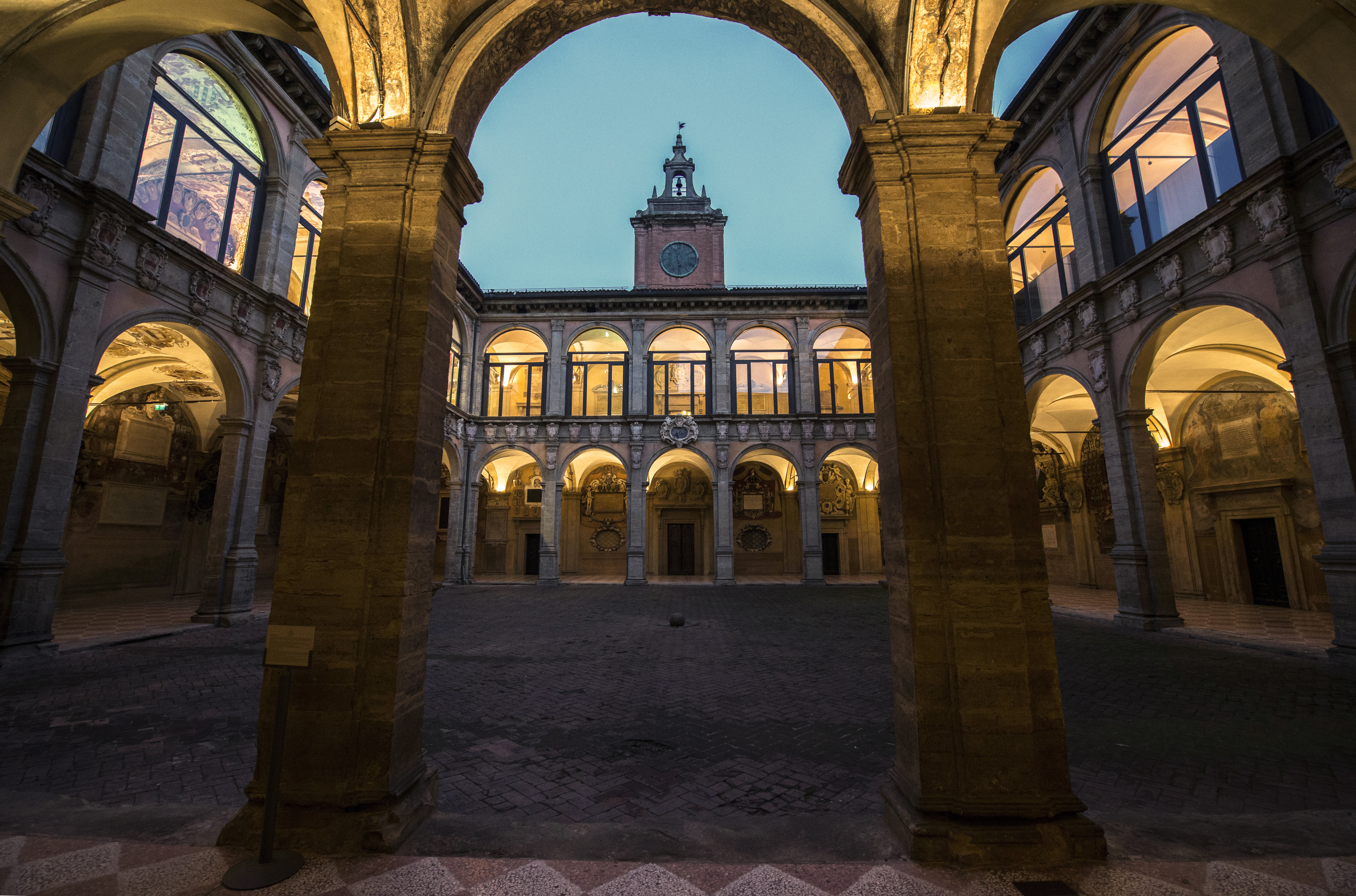
The University of Bologna in northern Italy, founded in 1088, is the world's oldest university in continuous operation.

In the 10th century, north Italy, although formally under the rule of the Holy Roman Empire, was included in the kingdom of Italy, of which Pavia remained the capital until 1024, however, gradually, starting from the last decades of the 11th century was in fact divided in a multiplicity of small, autonomous city-states, the medieval communes and maritime republic. The 11th century marked a significant boom in northern Italy's economy, due to improved trading and agricultural innovations, culture flourished as well with many universities founded, among them the University of Bologna, the world's oldest university in continuous operation.

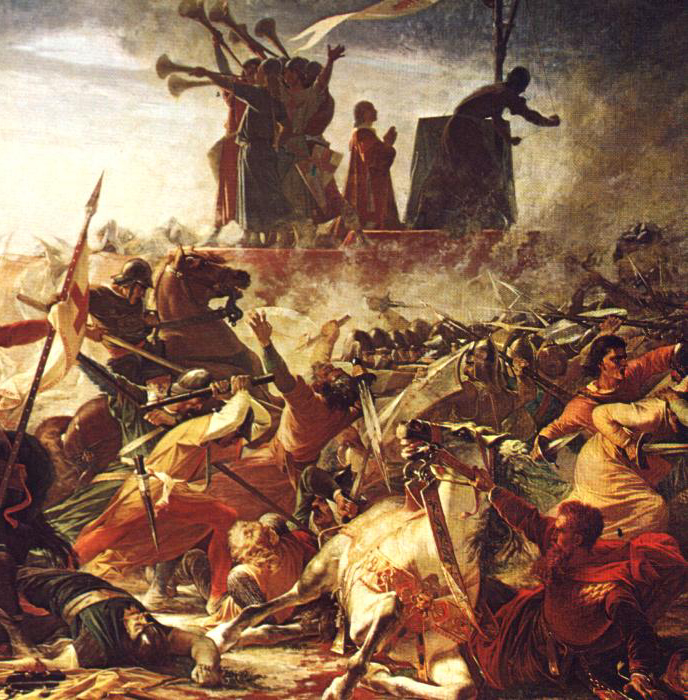
The defence of the Carroccio during the battle of Legnano (1176) by Amos Cassioli (1832–1891)

The increasing richness of the city-states made them able to defy the traditional feudal supreme power, represented by the German emperors and their local vassals. This process led to the creation of different Lombard Leagues formed by allied cities of Lombardy that defeated the Hohenstaufen Emperor Frederick I, at Legnano, and his grandson Frederick II, at Parma, and becoming virtually independent from the German emperors. Although having the military purpose as preponderant, the Lombard League also had its own stable government, considered one of the first examples of confederation in Europe.

The Leagues failed to develop from an alliance to a lasting confederation and subsequently, among the various local city-states, a process of consolidation took place; most of them became lordships ruled by powerful families like the Della Scala of Verona or the Visconti of Milan, and conquered neighbouring cities threatening to unify northern Italy into one kingdom, a revived Lombard empire.

In the end, a balance of power was reached in 1454 with the Peace of Lodi and northern Italy ended up divided between a small number of regional states, the most powerful were the Duchies of Savoy, Milan, Mantua, Ferrara and the Republics of Genoa and Venice, which had begun to extend its influence in the mainland from the 14th century onwards.

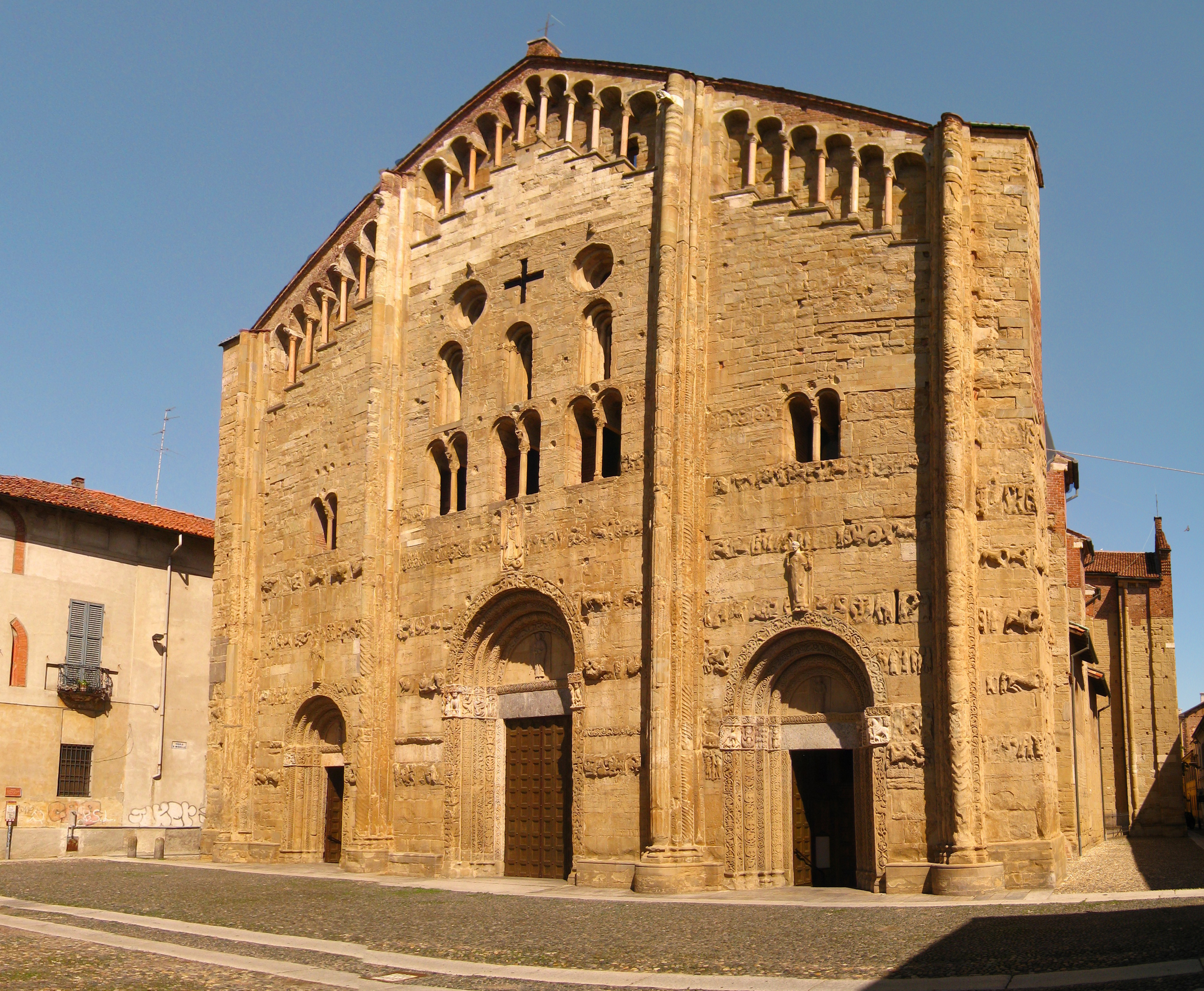
San Michele Maggiore, Pavia, where almost all the kings of Italy were crowned up to Frederick Barbarossa

In the 15th century, northern Italy became one of the centres of the Renaissance whose culture and works of art were highly regarded. The enterprising class of the communes extended its trade and banking activities well into northern Europe and "Lombards", the term that designated the merchants or bankers coming from northern Italy, were present in all of Europe. The Italian Wars between 1494 and 1559 ended the north Italian Renaissance and brought the region to be fought between France and the Spanish and Austrian House of Habsburg. After the decisive Battle of Pavia, most of present-day Lombardy became under the direct or indirect control of Spain. At the same time Ottoman control of the eastern Mediterranean and the discoveries of sea routes to Asia around Africa and the Americas led to the decline of the Venetian Republic. While the Republic of Genoa managed to become the main banking base of the Spanish Empire.

Pestilences, like that of 1628/1630, and the generally declining conditions of Italy's economy in the 17th and 18th centuries halted the further development of northern Italy. The only polity that managed to thrive in this period was the Savoy's state which, thanks to military and diplomatic victories in 1720, managed to acquire the island of Sardinia, through which the then Dukes gained legitimacy as a proper Kingdom and increased Turin's importance as a European capital.

=== Modern history ===
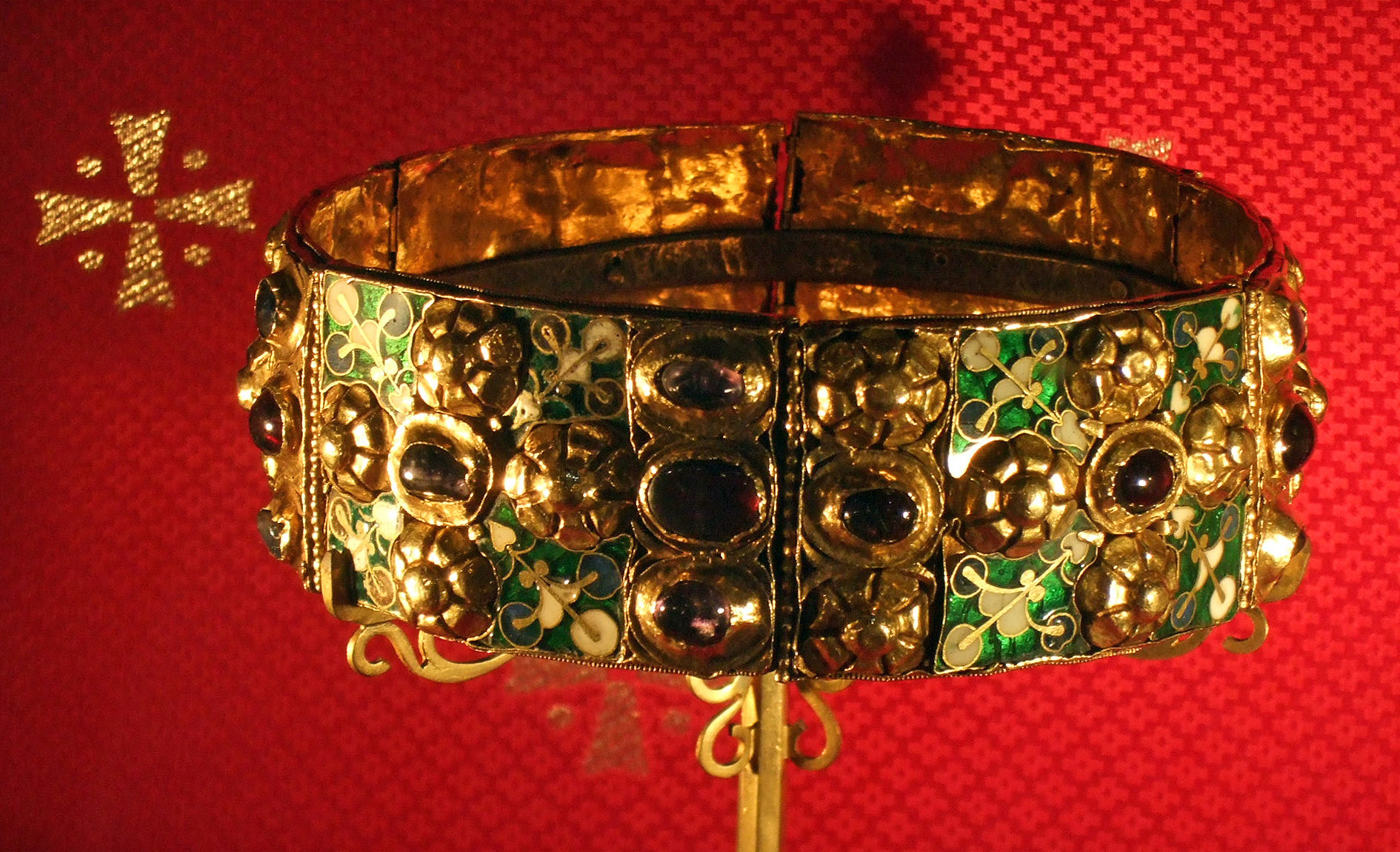
The Iron Crown of Lombardy, for centuries a symbol of the Kings of Italy

After the French Revolution in the late 18th century northern Italy was conquered by the French armies, many client republics were created by Napoleon and in 1805 a new Kingdom of Italy, made of all of northern Italy but Piedmont that was annexed to France, was established with Milan as capital and Napoleon as head of state. In the congress of Vienna, the Kingdom of Sardinia was restored, and furthermore enlarged by annexing the Republic of Genoa, contravening the principle of restoring the legitimate governments and monarchies of the old Republic.

The rest of northern Italy was under Austrian rule, either direct like in the Lombardo-Venetian Kingdom or indirect like in the Duchies of Parma and Modena. Bologna and Romagna were given to the Papal State. The Austrian imperial government was unpopular because of their anti-liberal politics and northern Italy became the intellectual centre leading the Italian unification process. Piedmont and the Kingdom of Sardinia, in particular, was the state that launched Italy's unification in 1859–1861. After defeating the Austrians in 1859 and annexing northern Italy the new state proceeded to launch a campaign to conquer southern and central Italy and Turin briefly became the capital of the almost whole of Italy.

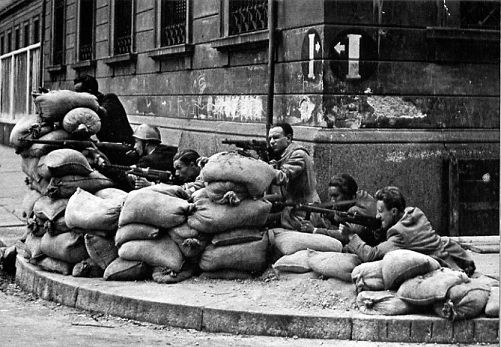
Italian partisans in Milan during the liberation of Italy, April 1945

After Italian unification the capital was moved from Turin to Rome and the administrative and institutional importance of northern Italy was substantially reduced. However, from the late 19th century and especially with the economic boom of the 1950s–1960s, northern Italy and especially the cities of Turin, Genoa, and Milan was the most important region in the Italian industrialization and sharpened its status of richest and most industrialized part of Italy.

During World War I Italian and Austro-Hungarian fought in brutal Mountain warfare between 1915 and 1918 on the Italian front where many large battles such as the Battles of the Isonzo and the Battle of Monte Grappa took place. Italy would be victorious over Austria-Hungary but at a high price. Between 1943 and 1945, during the Second World War, northern Italy was part of the Fascist Italian Social Republic and the main theatre of the anti-fascist partisan activity. Between April 19 and 25, 1945 the cities of northern Italy began an insurrection against Fascist and Nazi forces that led to the liberation of northern Italy by Allied forces. Economic differences between northern Italy and the rest of the country, as well as the short history of Italy as a single nation, led in the 1990s to the emergence of Padanian nationalism, as Lega Nord promoted either secession or larger autonomy for Padania, the name chosen to represent northern Italy.

== Geography ==
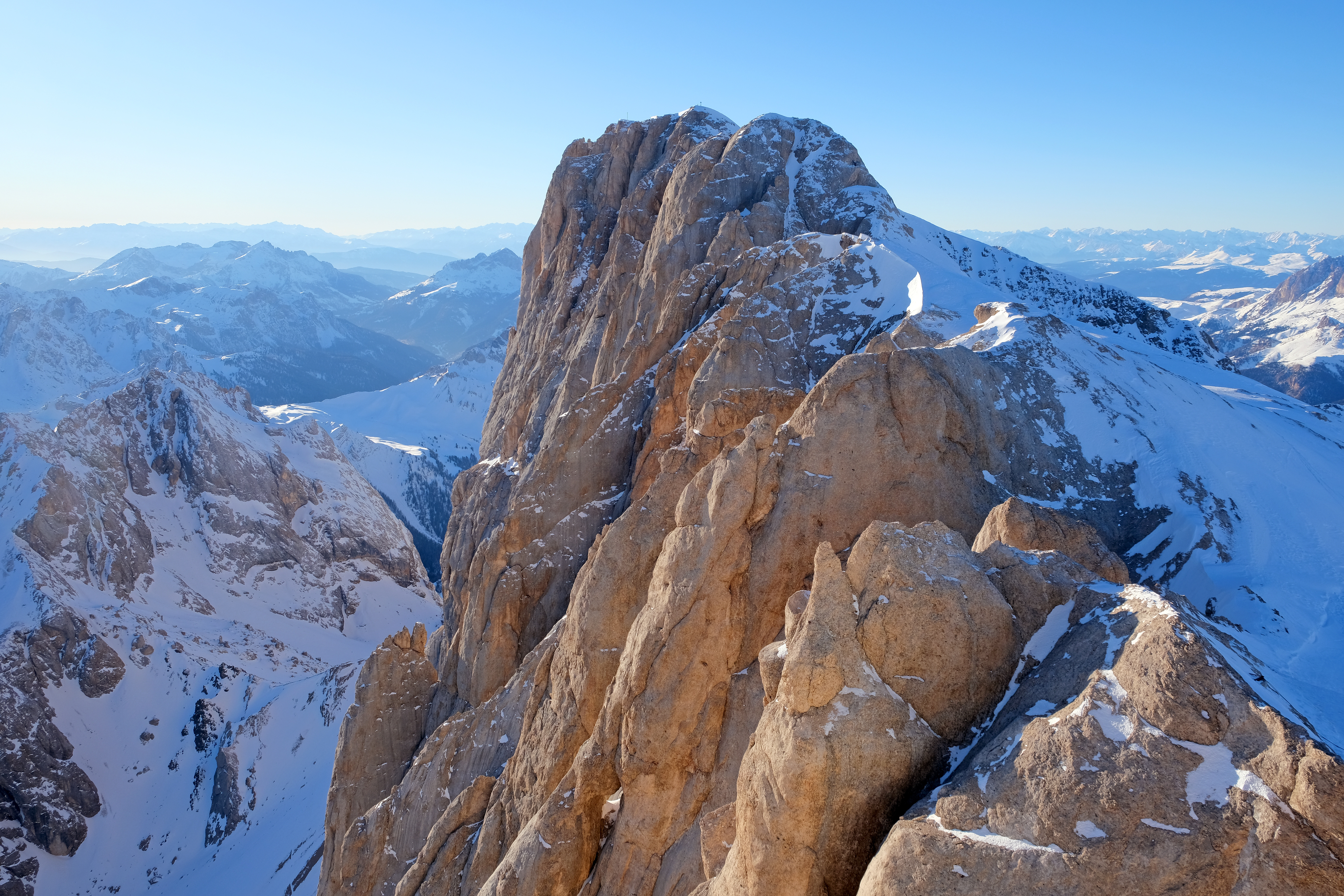
The Dolomites are a UNESCO World Heritage Site.

Northern Italy is made of the basin of the River Po, which comprises the whole of the broad plain extending from the foot of the Apennines to that of the Alps, together with the valleys and slopes on both sides of it, the Venetian Plain and the Ligurian coast. Northern Italy has the Alps as the northern and western boundary and the Apennine Mountains as the southern one. In between the two mountain ranges lies a large plain made of the Venetian Plain and the valley of the Po, the largest river in Italy, which flows 652 km (405 miles) eastward from the Cottian Alps to the Adriatic Sea and receives all the waters that flow from the Apennines northwards, and all those that descend from the Alps towards the south. The Po Valley is the largest plain in Italy and holds the vast majority of the north Italian population.

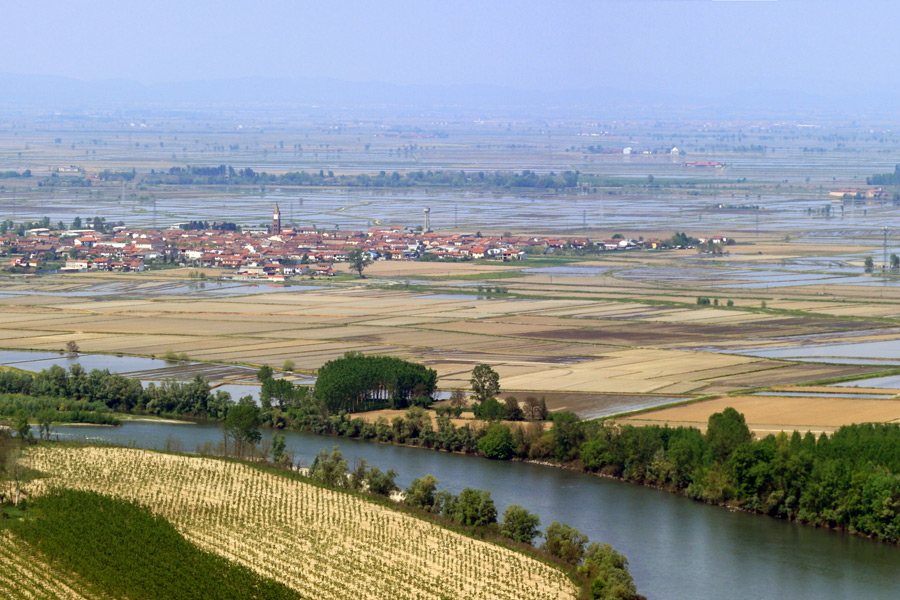
Rice paddies in the Po Valley near Vercelli

The Alps are home to some worldwide-known mountains like the Matterhorn (Cervino), Monte Rosa, Gran Paradiso in the western Alps, and Bernina, Stelvio and Dolomites along the eastern side of the Alps. The highest peak in Europe is Mont Blanc, at 4,810 m (15,780 feet) above sea level, located at the border with France.

With the exception of part of Liguria all of northern Italy lies in the drainage basin of the Adriatic Sea (with rivers Po, Piave, Adige, Brenta, Tagliamento, Reno) though the waters from some border municipalities (Livigno in Lombardy, Innichen and Sexten in Trentino-Alto Adige/Südtirol) drain into the Black Sea through the basin of the Danube, and the waters from the Lago di Lei in Lombardy drain into the North Sea through the basin of the Rhine.

On the foothills of the Alps, there are a number of subalpine moraine-dammed lakes, the largest of which is Garda. Other well known of these subalpine lakes are Lake Maggiore, whose most northerly section is part of Switzerland, Como, Orta, Lugano, Iseo, Idro.

=== Climate ===
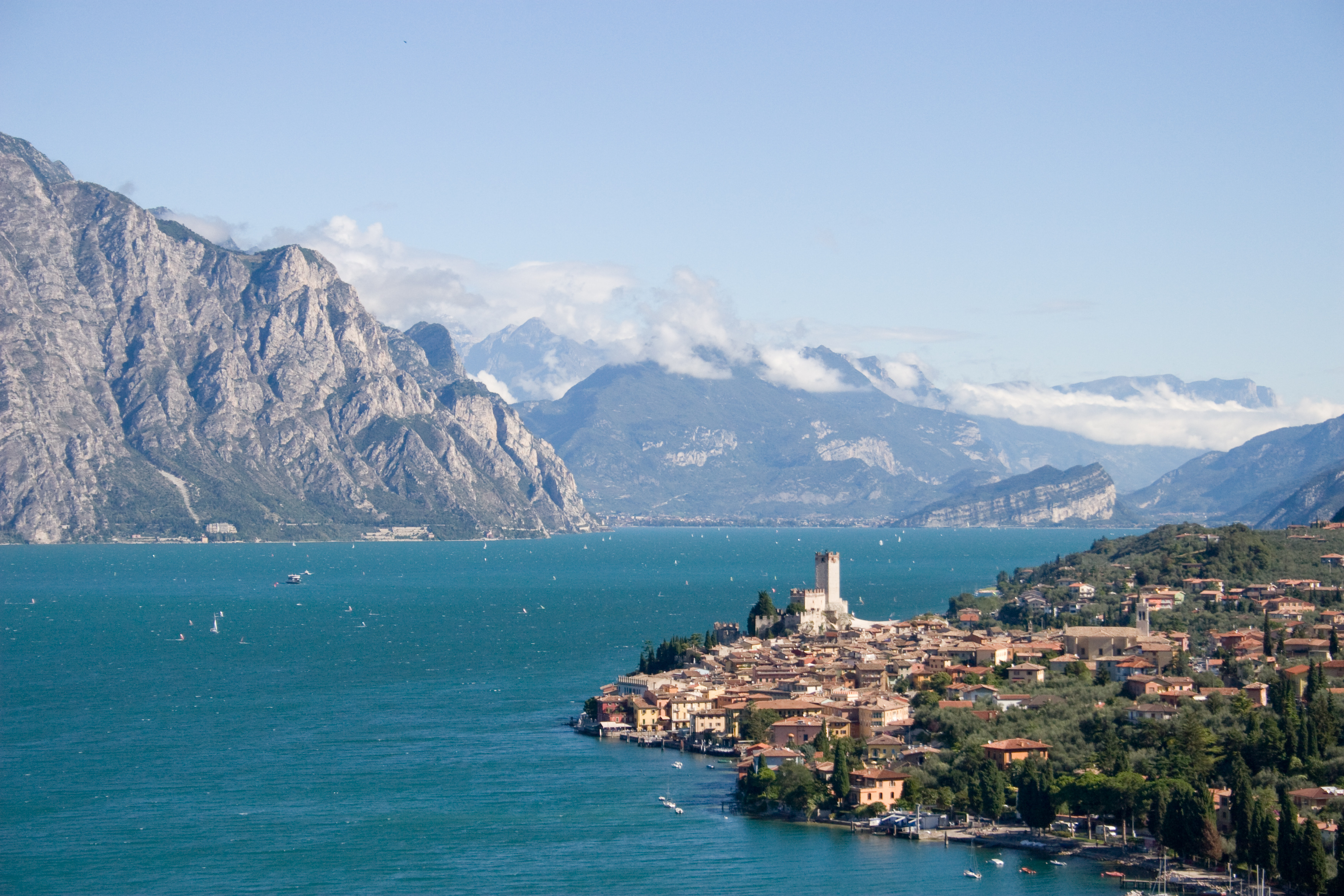
Alpine lakes like Lake Garda are characterised by warmer microclimates than the surrounding areas.

The climate of northern Italy is mainly humid subtropical (Köppen Cfa), especially in the plains. Winter in northern Italy is normally long, relatively dry and rather cold. In addition, there is a high seasonal temperature variation between summer and winter. In the mountains, the climate is humid continental (Köppen Dfb). In the valleys it is cold but usually with low humidity, while it can be severely cold above 1,000 metres (3,300 ft), with copious snowfalls. The coastal areas of Liguria generally fit the Mediterranean climate profile. In the Alpine foothills, characterised by an Oceanic climate (Köppen Cfb), numerous lakes exercise a mitigating influence, allowing the cultivation of typically Mediterranean crops (olives, citrus fruit).

A peculiarity of the regional climate is the thick fog that covers the plains between October and February, especially in the central Po Plain. The east coast, particularly on the Gulf of Trieste is occasionally affected by the cold bora winds in winter and spring.

The coldest month is January: the Po valley's mean temperature is between −1 and 1 °C (30 and 34 °F). Winter morning lows can occasionally reach −30 to −20 °C (−22 to −4 °F) in the Alps and −14 to −8 °C (7 to 18 °F) in the Po valley, with records close to −30 °C (−22 °F) near Bologna during some of the coldest winters. Summer is usually more stable, although quite stormy near the Alps, with July temperatures in the range 22–24 °C (72–75 °F) near the Alps or by the sea, like in Milan or Venice, whereas in southern Po plain 24–25 °C (75–77 °F) can be reached, like in Bologna.

The number of days with lows below 0 °C (32 °F) is usually from 60 to 90 a year, with peaks of 100–110 days in the mainly rural zones. In the colder winters, the Venice Lagoon may freeze, and in the coldest ones even enough to walk on the ice sheet.

Precipitation is evenly distributed during the year, more abundant in spring and autumn at low altitudes and in summer at high elevations; it is more intense in the Prealpine zone, up to 1,500 to 2,000 mm (59 to 79 inches) annually, but is abundant also in the plains and Alpine zones, with an average of 600 to 850 mm (24 to 33 inches) annually. The total annual rainfall is on average 827 mm (32.6 inches). Snow is quite common between early December and early March in cities like Turin, Milan and Bologna, but sometimes it appears in late November or late March and even April. Both the Alps and the Apennine can see up to 500–1,000 cm (200–390 inches) of snow in a year at 2,000 m (6,600 feet); on the highest peaks of the Alps, snow may fall even during mid-summer, and glaciers are present.

=== Pollution ===
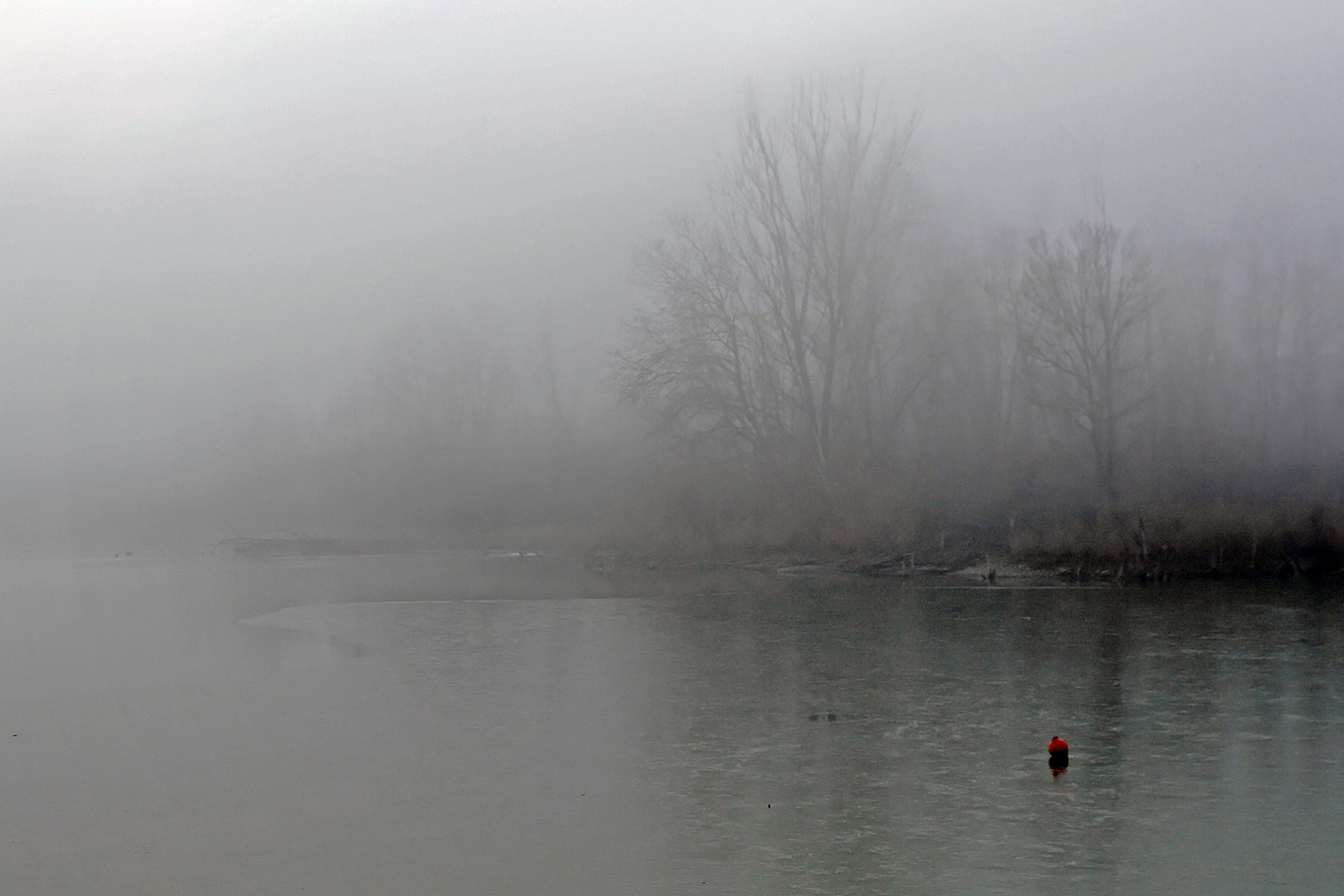
Fog on the Secchia River near Modena. Fog is a common occurrence in the Po Plain.

Because of high industrialization and the lack of wind due to being closed between mountain ranges air pollution remains a severe problem in northern Italy. Even though smog levels have decreased dramatically since the 1970s and 1980s, in 2005 a team of researchers at the Royal Netherlands Meteorological Institute reported that northern Italy was one of Europe's most polluted areas in terms of smog and air pollution due to its climatic and geographic conditions, which cause the stagnation of pollutants.

In March 2019, the European Space Agency (ESA) published images took from their satellites. These images show a big stain, made of nitrogen dioxide and fine particles, situated above the Po Valley area, which incorporates the city of Milan, Turin, and Bologna. Milan and Turin share high levels of ozone and nitrogen oxides, which are mainly produced by cars diesel and petrol engines. The big stain analyzed by ESA is the main reason why Po Valley air pollution levels are so high it is considered nowadays the worst area in Europe for air quality. To shed light on how dangerous it is for humans to live in polluted environments, Chicago Energy Policy Institute has recently developed the Air Quality Life Index (AQLI), a system capable of analyzing air pollution worldwide. According to AQLI findings, Po Valley air pollution affects inhabitants so hard that it cuts off about half a year of their life expectancy. The main reasons why there's a big stain of air pollution over the Po Valley are strictly connected to livestock and factories. The so-called "NPK fertilizers", made of nitrogen, phosphorus and potassium, along with manure emissions from intensive breeding and high levels of nitrogen dioxide released by diesel and petrol engines are all accountable for this disastrous air condition in northern Italy. The region of Lombardy produces also vast amounts of animal waste, a big contributor to pollution. It delivers more than 40 per cent of Italy's milk production, for example, while over half of the Italian pig production is located in the Po Valley.

According to a research, published in The Lancet Planetary Health in January 2021, which estimates the death rate associated with fine particulate matter (PM_{2.5}) and nitrogen dioxide (NO_{2}) pollution in 1,000 European cities, Brescia and Bergamo in Lombardy have the highest death rate from fine particulate matter (PM_{2.5}) in Europe. Vicenza (Veneto) and Saronno (Lombardy) are respectively in fourth and eighth place in the top ten of ten cities. Turin and Milan are also at the top of the European ranking – 3rd and 5th respectively – in terms of increased mortality from nitrogen dioxide, a gas that derives mainly from traffic and in particular from diesel vehicles, while Verona, Treviso, Padua, Como and Venice rank eleventh, fourteenth, fifteenth, seventeenth and twentythird respectively.

The data show that many cities in the Po Valley suffer the most serious impact at the European level due to poor air quality, first of all, the metropolitan area of Milan, thirteenth in the ranking in terms of fine particulate impact, where any year 3967 premature deaths – approximately 9% of the total.

== Regions ==
Region	Capital	Population (2026)	Area (km²)	Density (inh./km²)
Aosta Valley	Aosta	122,554	3,260.90	37.6
Emilia-Romagna	Bologna	4,477,009	22,509.67	198.4
Friuli-Venezia Giulia	Trieste	1,193,496	7,862.30	151.9
Liguria	Genoa	1,511,988	5,416.21	278.8
Lombardy	Milan	10,065,694	23,863.65	420.5
Piedmont	Turin	4,255,006	25,387.07	167.6
Trentino-Alto Adige/Südtirol	Trento	1,090,818	13,605.50	79.8
Veneto	Venice	4,857,460	18,407.42	263.6

Aosta Valley, Piedmont, Veneto, Trentino Alto-Adige, Liguria, Friuli-Venezia Giulia and Lombardy are also known as the Alpine regions of Italy, consisting of almost all of north Italy except for Emilia-Romagna.

== Languages ==
Languages and regional varieties in Italy

Northern Italy is dominated by the Gallo-Italic family of languages, as opposed to the rest of the country where the Italo-Romance languages are spoken, and they include Emilian, Ligurian, Lombard, Piedmontese, and Romagnol. Venetian, on the other hand, has different origins. Its precise place within the Romance language family remains somewhat controversial. Both Ethnologue and Glottolog group it into the Gallo-Italic branch. Devoto, Avolio and Ursini reject such classification, and Tagliavini places it in the Italo-Dalmatian branch of Romance.

The Gallo-Italic languages also reach the north of the Marche region in central Italy (province of Pesaro and Urbino and the city of Senigallia in province of Ancona) and Tuscany (most of the province of Massa-Carrara and the northernmost areas of Garfagnana in the province of Lucca, but also some parts of the Metropolitan City of Florence), so these areas are considered linguistically part of northern Italy.

In southern Italy Gallo-Italic languages are spoken in some language islands in Basilicata (Gallo-Italic of Basilicata) and Sicily (Gallo-Italic of Sicily). Other Gallo-Romance languages spoken are Occitan, Arpitan spoken in the Occitan and Arpitan valleys in western Piedmont, and the Rhaeto-Romance group which includes Friulian and Ladin.

Non-Romance languages are also spoken: Germanic languages such as "standard" German and Bavarian in South Tyrol, small Walser communities in Piedmont and Valle d'Aosta, and Cimbrian and mocheno in Veneto, Friuli and Trentino. Slavic languages are spoken in Friuli-Venezia Giulia: there are Slovenian minorities in the province of Trieste, in the eastern parts of those of Udine and Gorizia, and Istria, where the main languages today are Slovene and Croatian but Italian is recognized as a minority language due to the presence of the Istrian Italians.

=== History ===
During the Middle Ages, mainly between the thirteenth and fifteenth centuries, an illustrious vulgar was in use, by the name of "Lombard-Venetian koiné". In medieval sources, it was simply called "written language" or Lombard, because the toponym "Lombardy" was then used to indicate the entire region of northern Italy. This literary koiné manifested itself with authors such as Bonvesin da la Riva, Giacomino da Verona, Uguccione da Lodi, Girardo Patecchio, etc.

== Demographics ==
As of 2026, the population is 27,574,025, of which 49.2% are male, and 50.8% are female. Minors make up 14.5% of the population, and seniors make up 25.4%.

Historical population
Year	Pop.	±%
1871	12,380,226	—
1881	13,031,238	+5.3%
1901	14,572,366	+11.8%
1911	16,169,926	+11.0%
1921	18,311,966	+13.2%
1931	19,187,454	+4.8%
1936	19,520,279	+1.7%
1951	21,196,234	+8.6%
1961	22,686,324	+7.0%
1971	24,983,475	+10.1%
1981	25,720,477	+2.9%
1991	25,348,523	−1.4%
2001	25,593,232	+1.0%
2011	27,215,992	+6.3%
2021	27,373,273	+0.6%
Source: ISTAT

It is divided between:

- Northwest Italy: 15,955,242
- Northeast Italy: 11,618,783

=== Largest cities ===
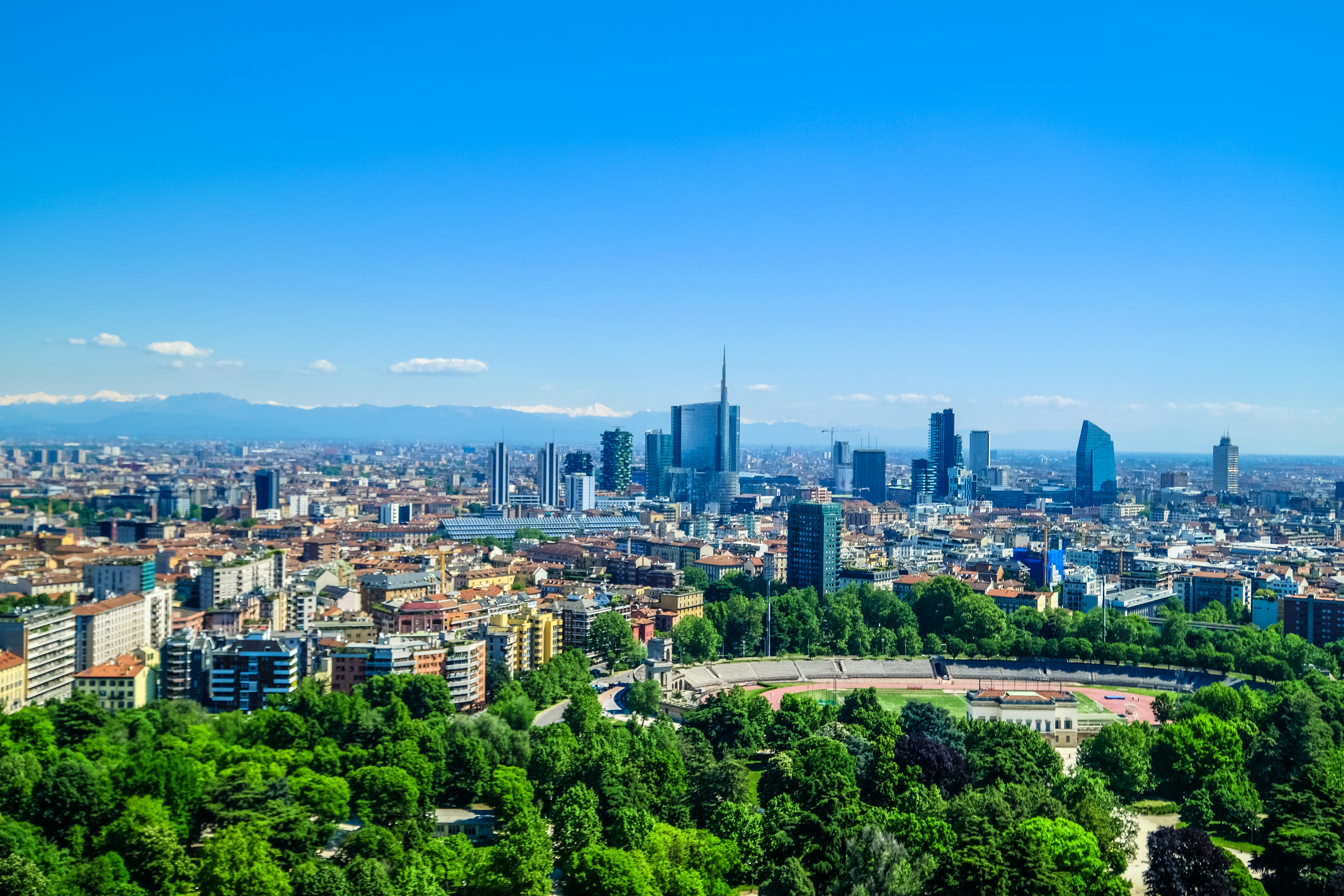
Milan

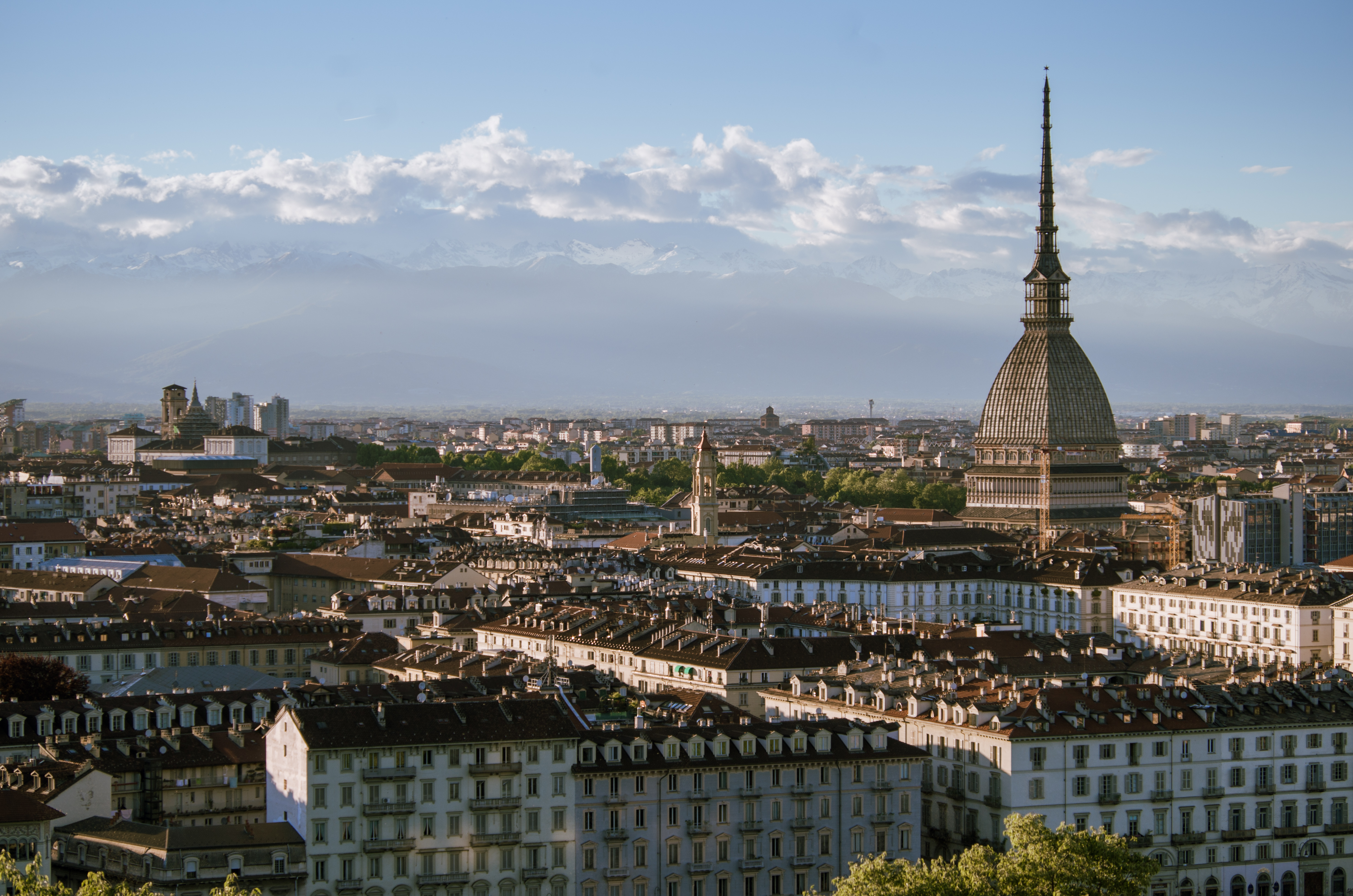
Turin

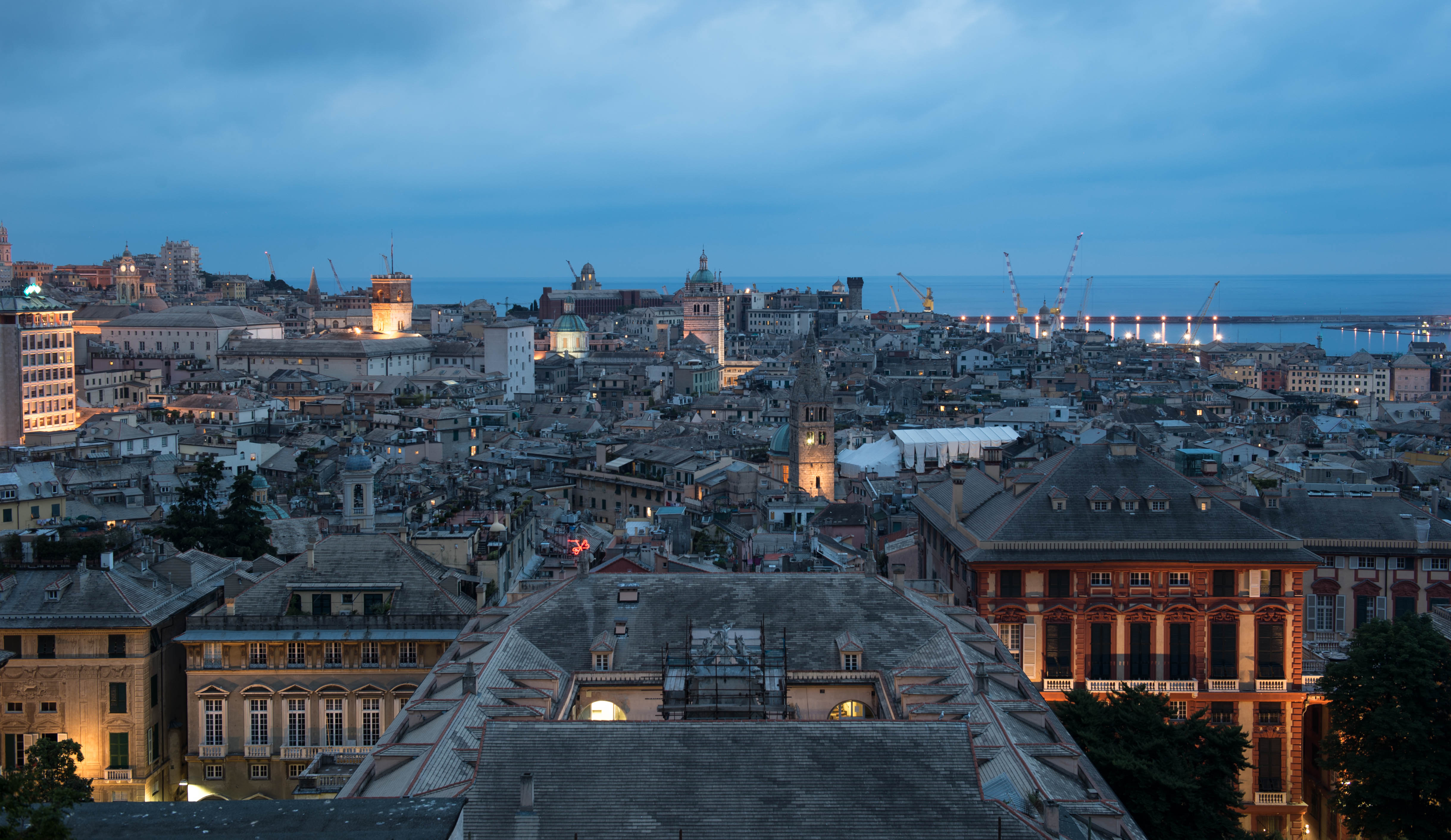
Genoa

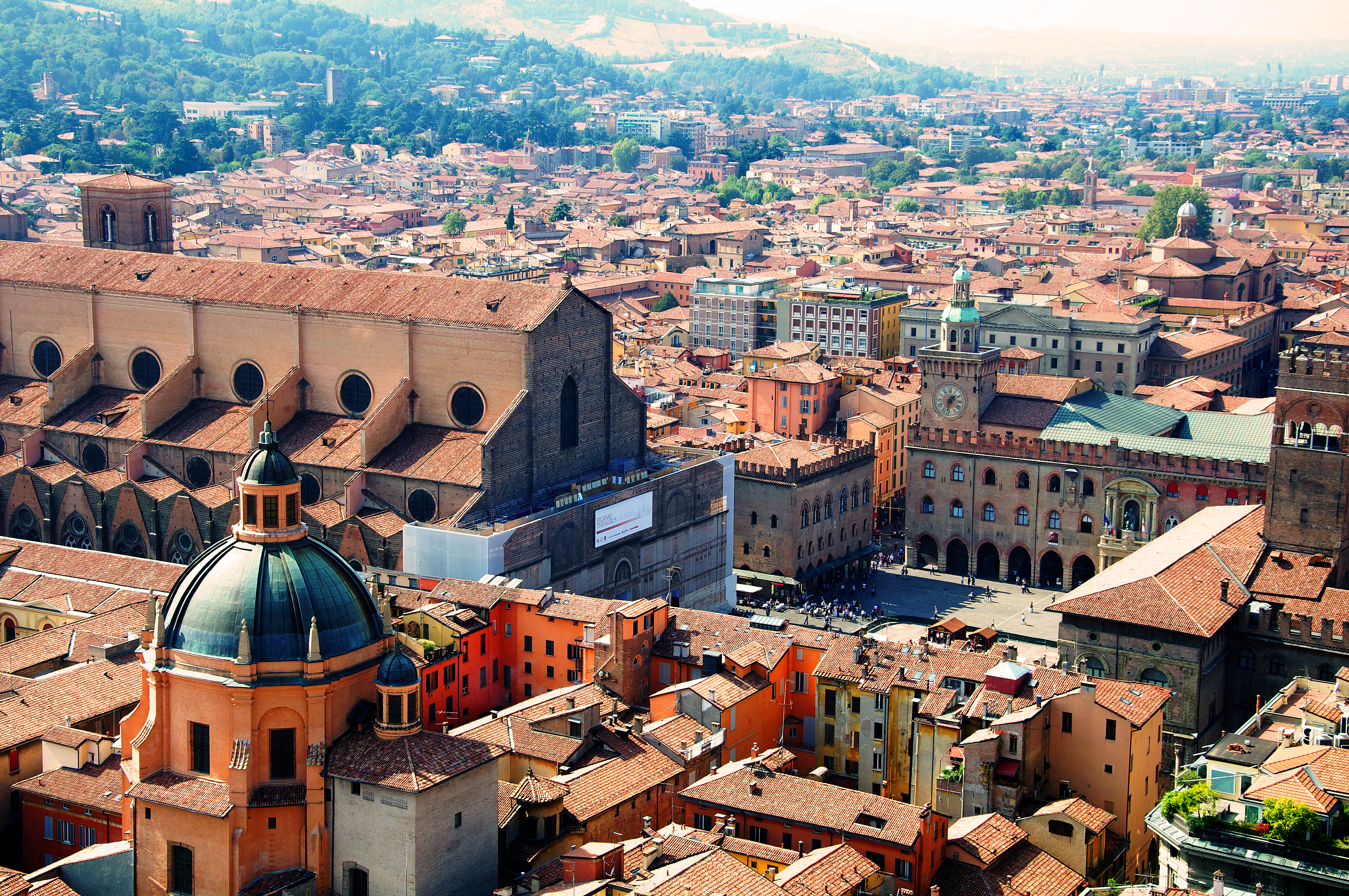
Bologna

City	Population (2026)	Region
Milan	1,362,863	Lombardy
Turin	855,654	Piedmont
Genoa	566,247	Liguria
Bologna	391,473	Emilia-Romagna
Verona	255,139	Veneto
Venice	249,385	Veneto
Padua	208,202	Veneto
Brescia	201,342	Lombardy
Parma	199,450	Emilia-Romagna
Trieste	198,622	Friuli-Venezia Giulia
Modena	184,361	Emilia-Romagna
Reggio Emilia	172,921	Emilia-Romagna
Ravenna	156,475	Emilia-Romagna
Rimini	150,774	Emilia-Romagna
Ferrara	129,048	Emilia-Romagna
Monza	123,672	Lombardy
Bergamo	120,629	Lombardy
Trento	119,359	Trentino-Alto Adige/Südtirol
Forlì	118,053	Emilia-Romagna
Vicenza	110,741	Veneto
Bolzano	106,901	Trentino-Alto Adige/Südtirol
Piacenza	103,737	Emilia-Romagna
Novara	103,238	Piedmont

=== Immigration ===
As of 2025, immigrants make up 14.6% of the population.

== Culture ==
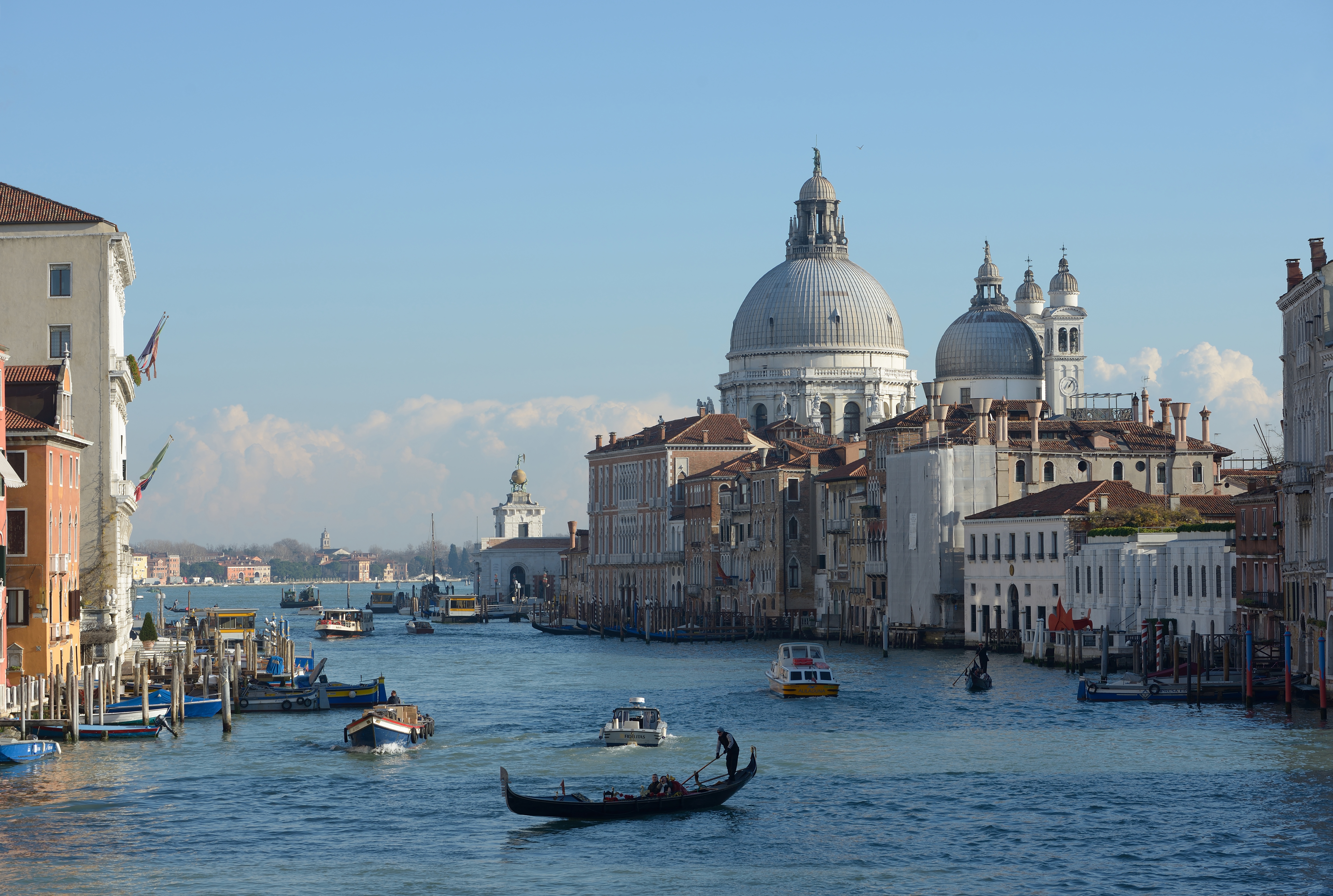
The city of Venice, ranked many times as the most beautiful city in the world

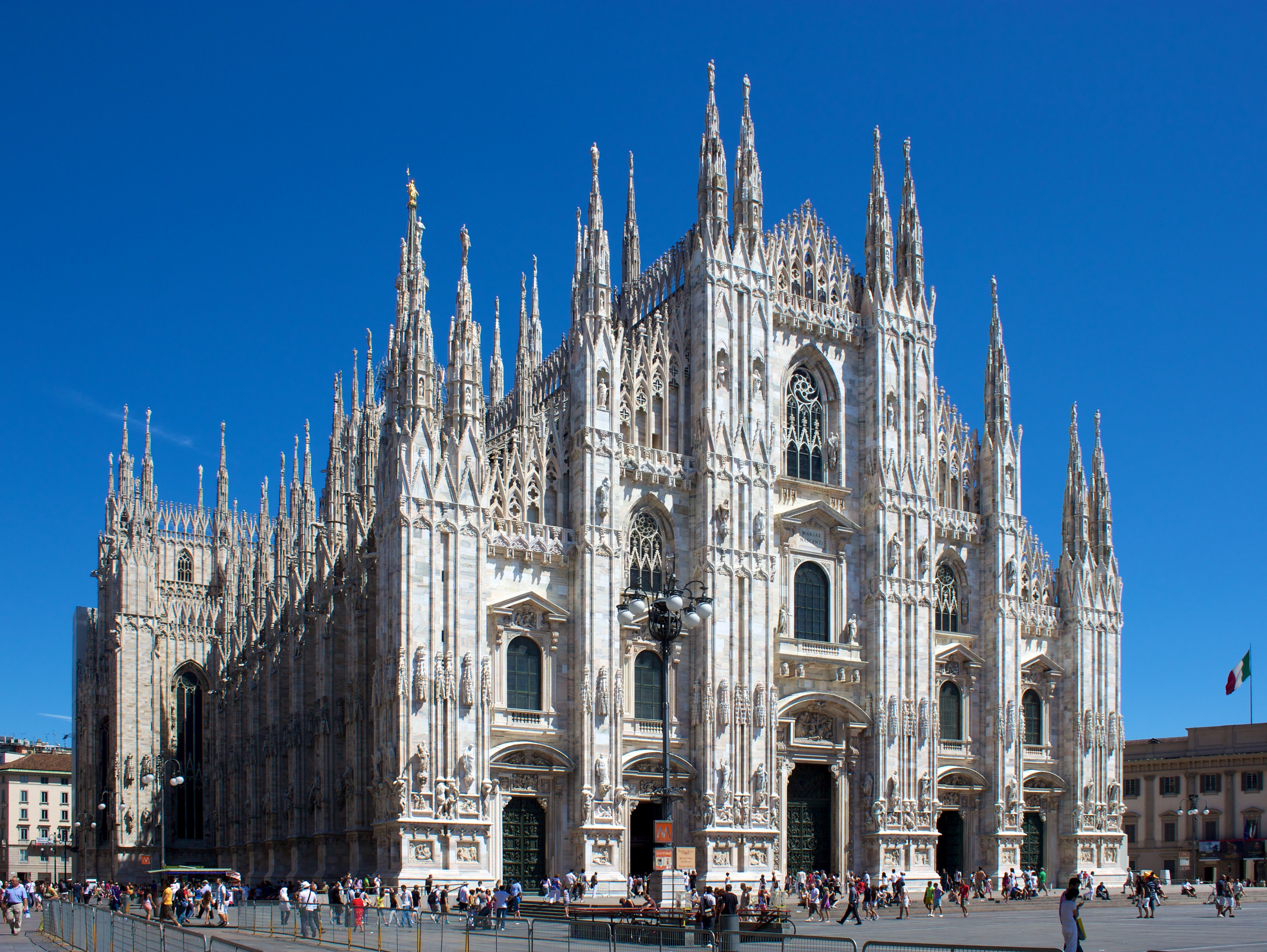
Milan Cathedral, the largest church in the Italian Republic—the larger St. Peter's Basilica is in the State of Vatican City, a sovereign state—and the third largest in the world

=== Cultural roots ===
The regions of northern Italy were exposed to different historical influences, which were due to the peoples and dominations that settled there, such as the Ligures, the Veneti, the Celts, the Etruscans, the Romans, the Byzantines, the Lombards, the Spanish and the Austrians. Some of its woodlands and mountains are preserved in several National Parks; a major example is the Gran Paradiso National Park, between Aosta Valley and Piedmont, which is the oldest national park in Italy. The first two most visited regions of Italy are Veneto and Trentino-Alto Adige, while the fourth and fifth are Emilia-Romagna and Lombardy.

=== UNESCO sites, sports and tourism ===
Northern Italy has many major tourist attractions, many of which are protected by UNESCO. Northern Italy is the home of the Italian Riviera, including Portofino, Sanremo, and of Cinque Terre. There are many historic cities in this part of Italy: Turin, the manufacturing capital of Italy, Milan, the business and fashion capital of the country and the important port of Genoa are the most popular tourist destinations of the area. Other cities like Aosta, Bergamo, Brescia, Como and Mantua have a rich cultural heritage, which shares the region's visitors with beautiful landscapes such as the lakes Garda (with Grottoes of Catullus and Gardone Riviera), Como (with Bellagio and Varenna) and Maggiore (with Borromean Islands and Angera). There are also important ski resorts like Sestriere, Courmayeur, Breuil-Cervinia, Livigno and Bormio.

This part of Italy also boasts several important tourist attractions, such as the canal-filled city of Venice, the cities of Verona, Vicenza, Padua, Trento, Bolzano, Cremona, Bologna, Modena, Ferrara, Parma, Ravenna, Cesena, Rimini and Trieste. There are also several mountain ranges such as the Dolomites, the Carnic and Julian Alps and first-class ski resorts like Cortina d'Ampezzo and Madonna di Campiglio.

=== Cuisine ===
Notably, Northern Italy is considered a "butter" (burro) region, being north of the invisible "olive oil-butter divide" line. As the Alpine climate was less suitable for growing olives than Mediterranean climate, butter was the staple cooking fat in the more mountainous Northern areas, more reliant on livestock and dairy, as opposed to the olive oil used in the South.

Ligurian cuisine consists of dishes from the culinary tradition of Liguria, a region of northwestern Italy, which makes use of ingredients linked both to local production (such as preboggion, a mixture of wild herbs), and to imports from areas with which, over the centuries, the Ligurians have had frequent trade (such as pecorino sardo, one of the ingredients of pesto).

Venetian cuisine, from the city of Venice, or more widely from the region of Veneto, has a centuries-long history and differs significantly from other cuisines of northern Italy (notably Friuli-Venezia Giulia and Trentino-Alto Adige/Südtirol), and of neighbouring Austria and of Slavic countries (notably Slovenia and Croatia), despite sharing some commonalities. Cuisine in Veneto may be divided into three main categories, based on geography: the coastal areas, the plains, and the mountains. Each one (especially the plains) can have many local cuisines, each city with its own dishes.

Lombard cuisine is the style of cooking in the northern Italian region of Lombardy. The historical events of its provinces and the diversity of its territories resulted in a varied culinary tradition. First courses in Lombard cuisine range from risottos to soups and stuffed pasta (in broth or not), and a large choice of second-course meat or fish dishes, due to the many lakes and rivers of Lombardy. The cuisine of the various Lombardy provinces can be united by the following traits: prevalence of rice and stuffed pasta over dry pasta, both butter and olive oil for cooking, dishes cooked for a long time, as well as the widespread use of pork, milk and dairy products, and egg-based preparations; to which is added the consumption of polenta, common to the whole northern Italy.

Emilia-Romagna is especially known for its egg and filled pasta made with soft wheat flour. The Romagna subregion is renowned for pasta dishes like cappelletti, garganelli, strozzapreti, sfoglia lorda, and tortelli alla lastra as well as cheeses such as squacquerone, piadina snacks are also a specialty of the subregion. Bologna and Modena are notable for pasta dishes like tortellini, tortelloni, lasagne, gramigna, and tagliatelle which are found also in many other parts of the region in different declinations, while Ferrara is known for cappellacci di zucca, pumpkin-filled dumplings, and Piacenza for pisarei e faśö, wheat gnocchi with beans and lard. The celebrated balsamic vinegar is made only in the Emilian cities of Modena and Reggio Emilia, following legally binding traditional procedures.

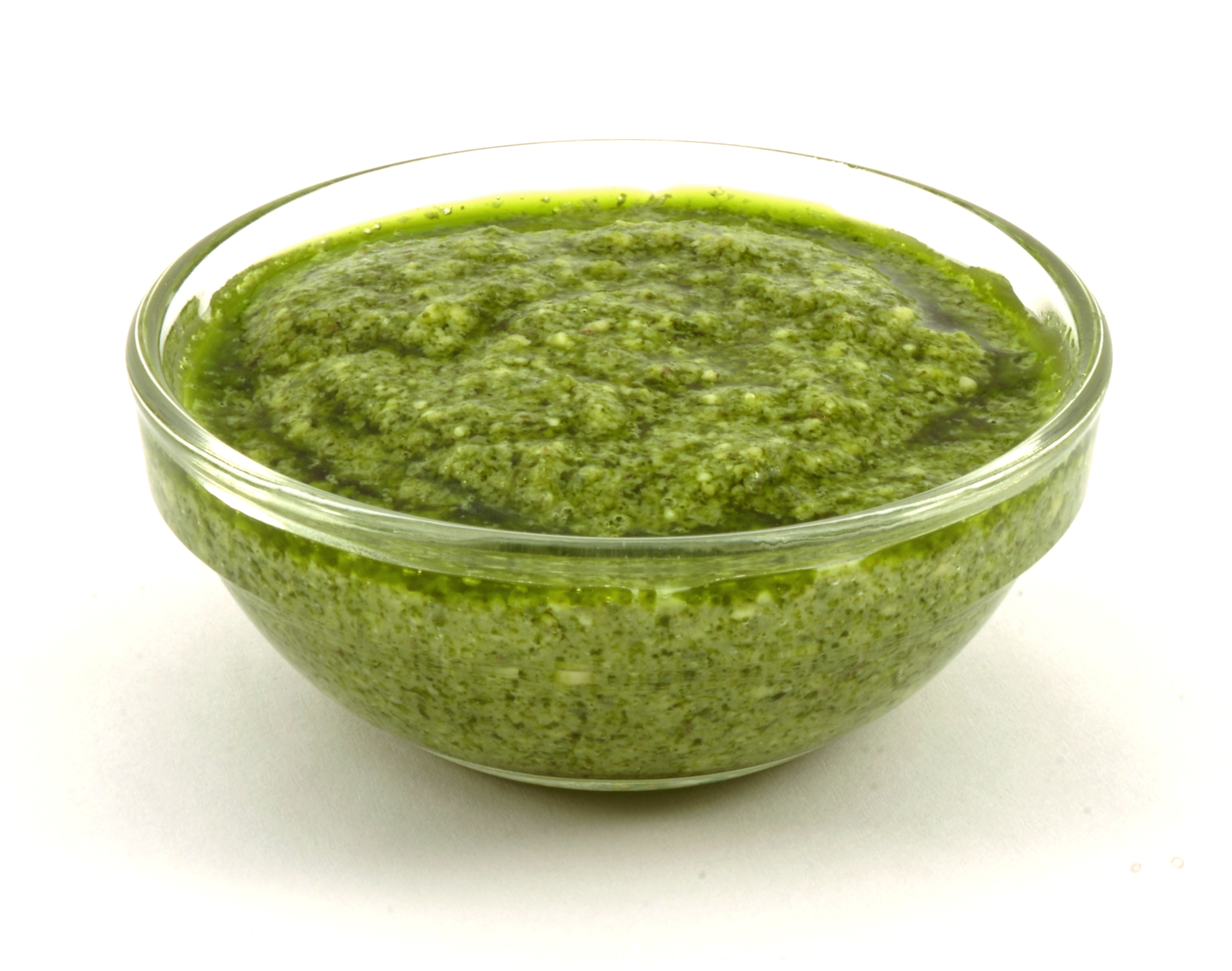
Pesto, a Ligurian sauce

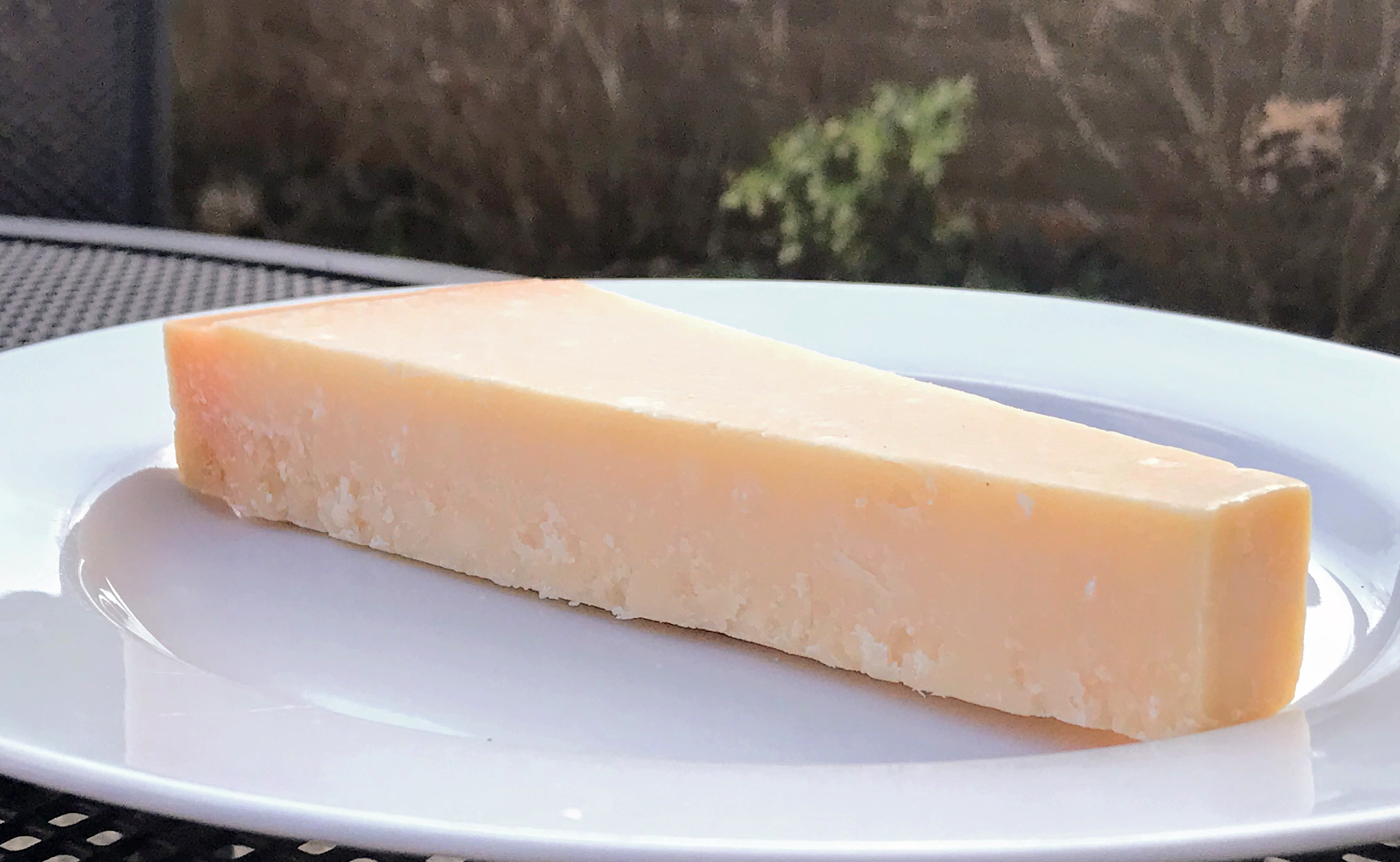
Parmesan cheese, originally from Emilia-Romagna

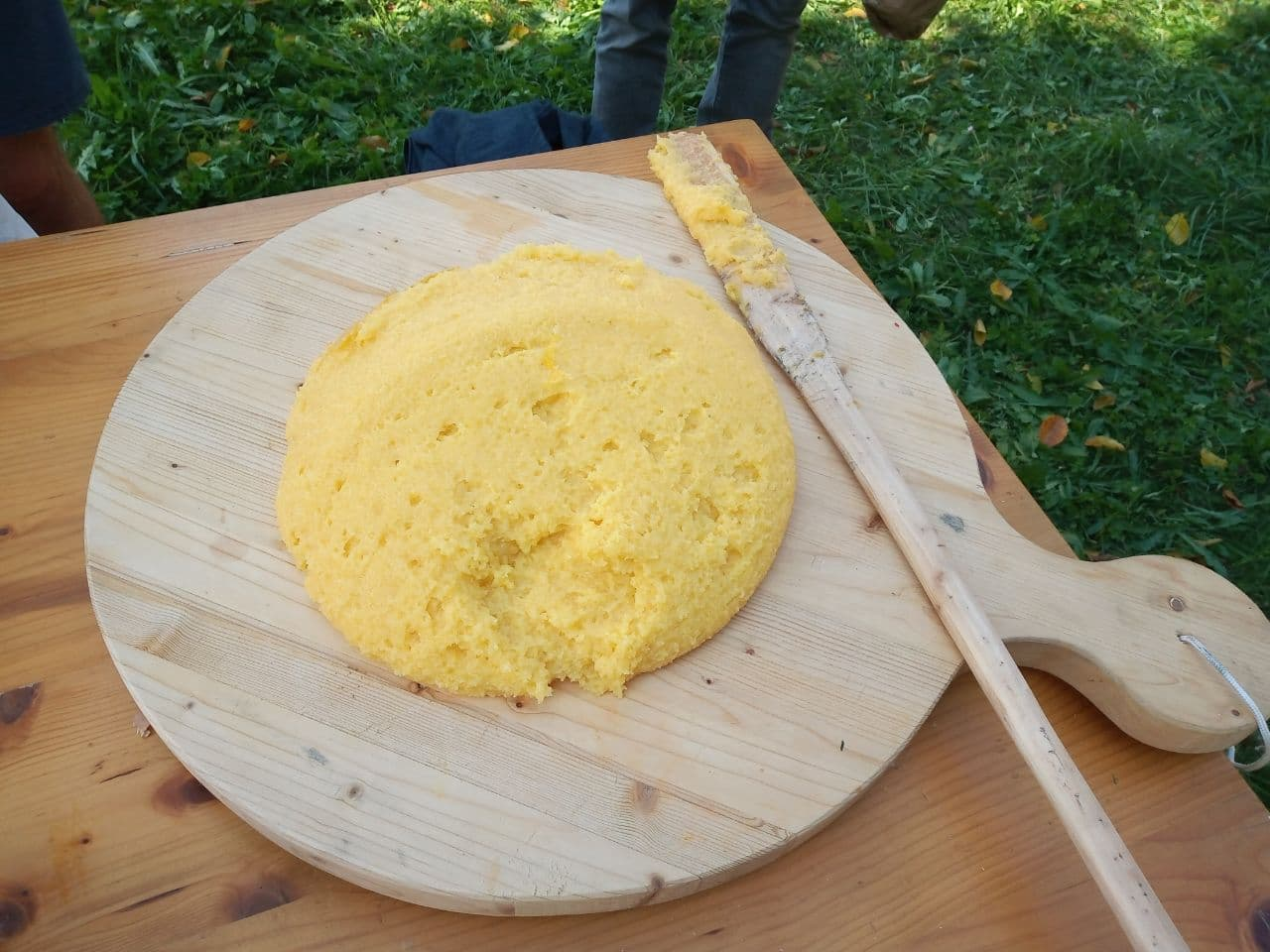
Polenta

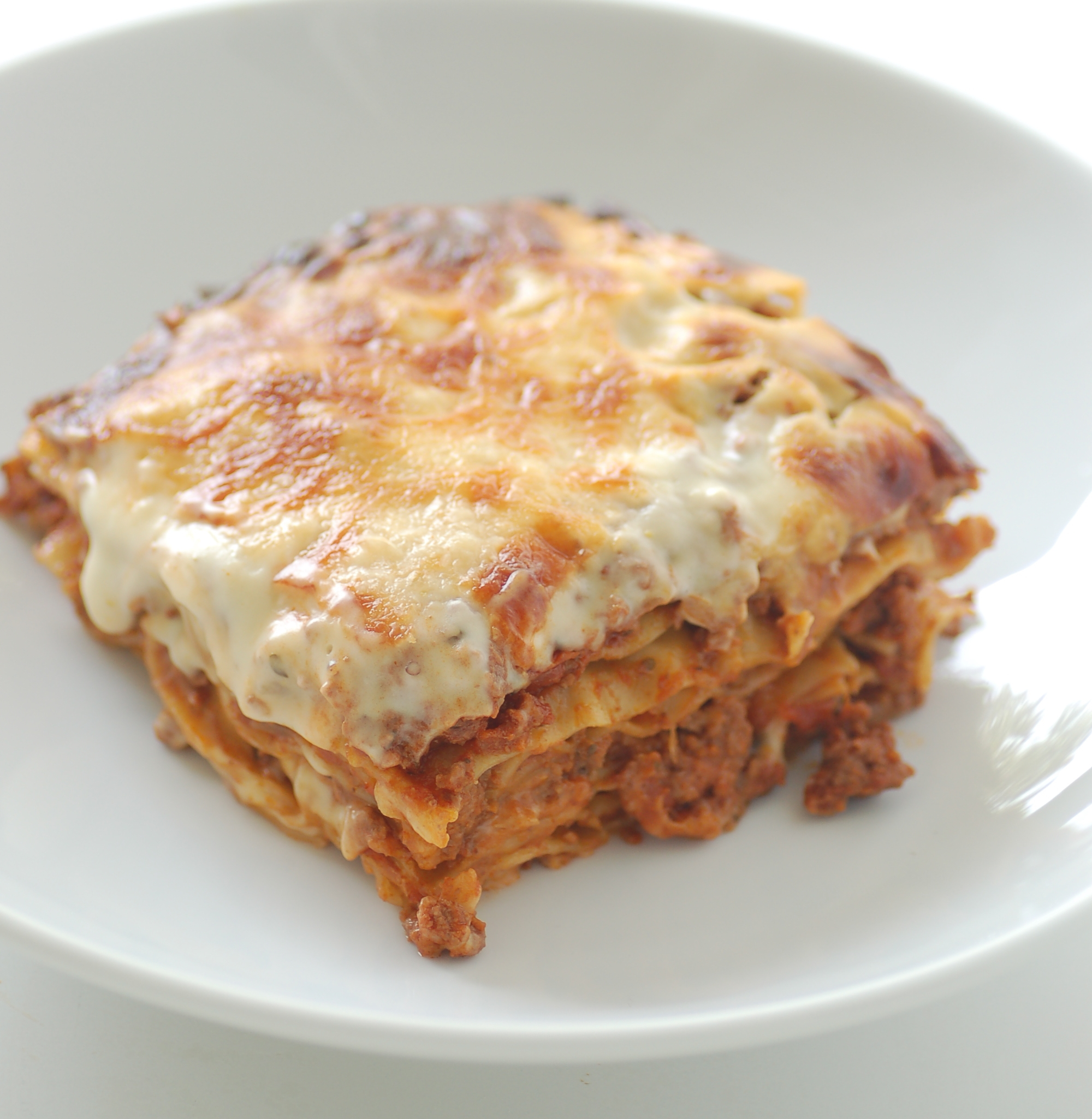
Lasagne

=== Legends and folklore ===
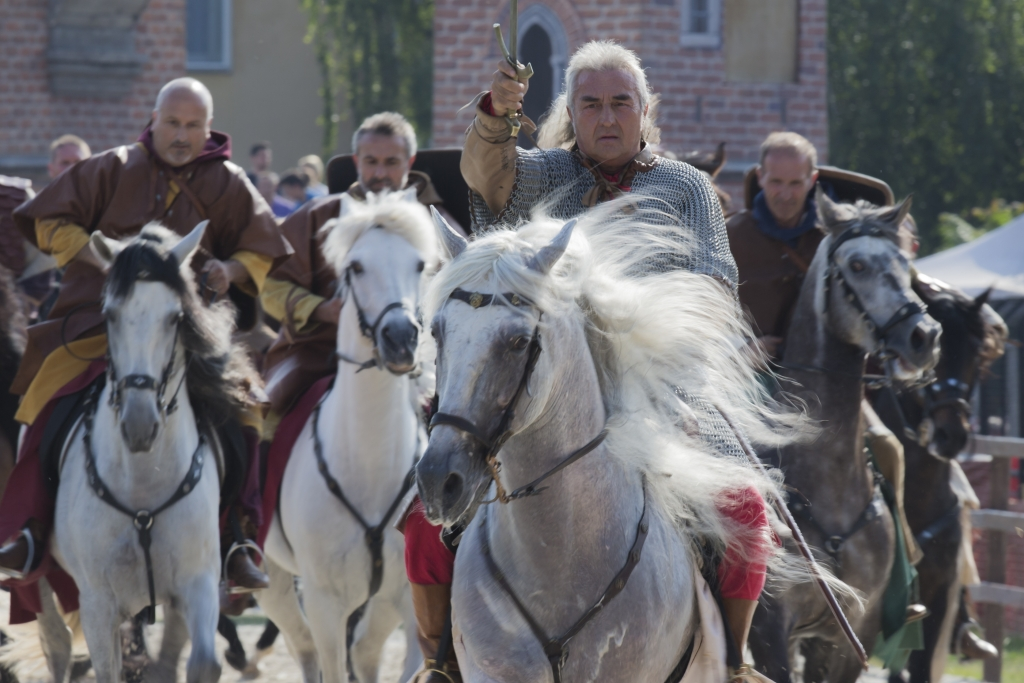
Folkloristic reconstruction of the Company of Death led by Alberto da Giussano who is preparing to carry out the charge during the battle of Legnano at the Palio di Legnano 2014

The Badalisc is a mythical creature of the Val Camonica in the southern central Alps. The Badalisc is represented today as a creature with a big head covered with a goat skin, two small horns, a huge mouth and glowing eyes. According to legend the Badalisc lives in the woods around the village of Andrista (comune of Cevo) and is supposed to annoy the community: each year it is captured during the period of Epiphany (5 & 6 January) and led on a rope into the village by musicians and masked characters, including il giovane ("the young man"), il vecchio ("the old man"), la vecchia ("the old woman") and the young signorina, who is "bait" for the animal's lust. There are also some old witches, who beat drums, and bearded shepherds, and a hunchback (un torvo gobetto) who has a "rustic duel" with the animal. Traditionally only men take part, although some are dressed as women. In medieval times women were prohibited from participating in the exhibition, or even seeing or hearing the Badalisc's Speech; if they did so they would be denied Holy Communion the following day.

Alberto da Giussano is a legendary character of the 12th century who would have participated, as a protagonist, in the battle of Legnano on 29 May 1176. In reality, according to historians, the actual military leader of the Lombard League in the famous military battle with Frederick Barbarossa was Guido da Landriano. Historical analyses made over time have indeed shown that the figure of Alberto da Giussano never existed. In the past, historians, attempting to find a real confirmation, hypothesized the identification of his figure with Albertus de Carathe (Alberto da Carate) and Albertus Longus (Alberto Longo), both among the Milanese who signed the pact in Cremona in March 1167 which established the Lombard League, or in an Alberto da Giussano mentioned in an appeal of 1196 presented to Pope Celestine III on the administration of the church-hospital of San Sempliciano. These, however, are all weak identifications, given that they lack clear and convincing historical confirmation.

== Economy ==
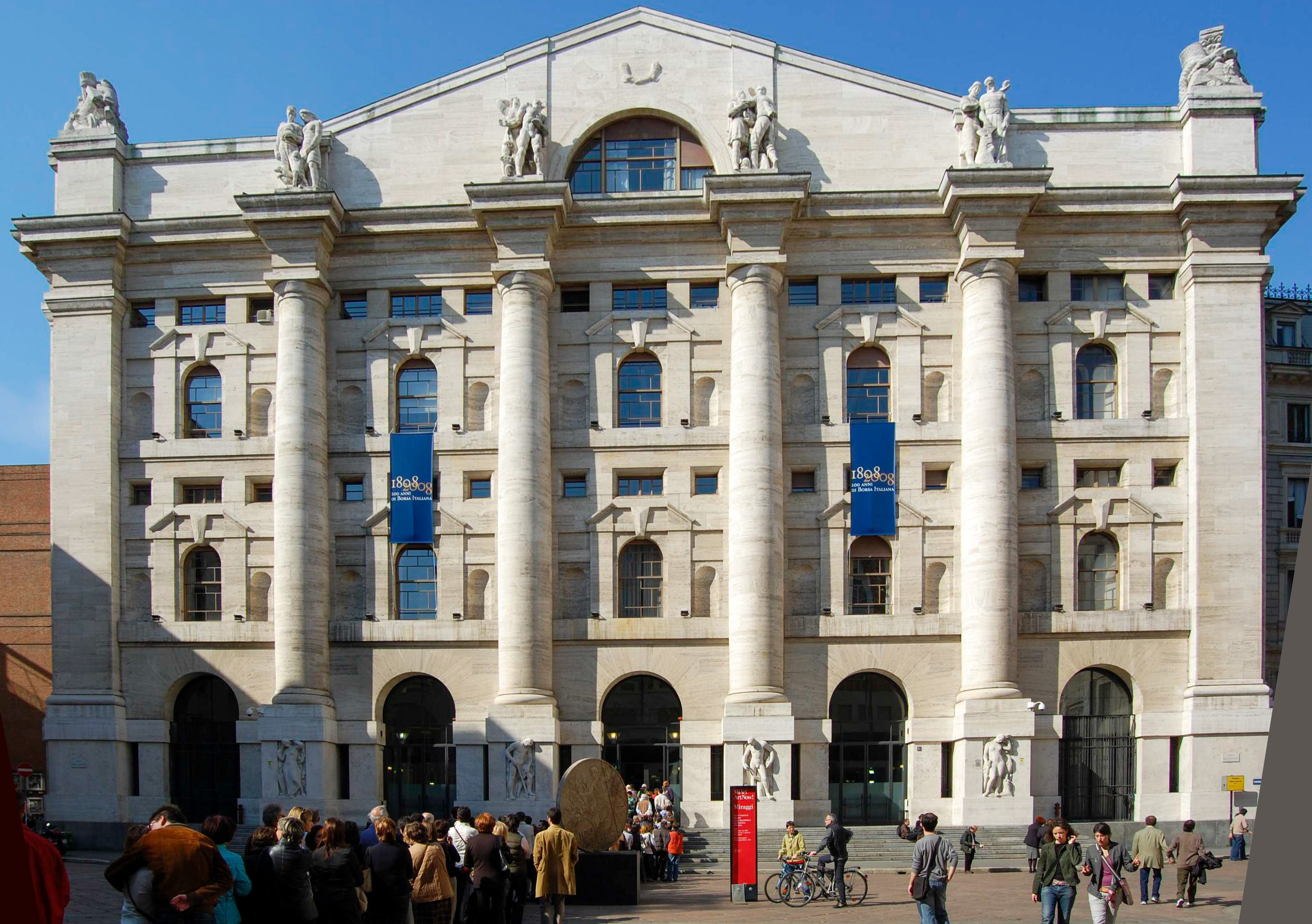
Palazzo Mezzanotte in Milan, the seat of the Italian stock exchange

Northern Italy is the most developed and productive area of the country, with one of the highest GDPs per capita in Europe. It was the first part of Italy to become industrialised in the second half of the 19th century; the so-called industrial triangle was formed by the manufacturing centres of Milan and Turin, as well as the seaport of Genoa.

Since then, the industrial core of the area has shifted eastward; the current industrial triangle consists of Lombardy, Veneto, and Emilia-Romagna. A similar shift happened for GDP per capita, and the eastern regions (including Lombardy) have since become wealthier than Piedmont and Liguria. With a 2021 nominal GDP estimated at €1.0 trillion, northern Italy accounts for 56% of the Italian economy, despite having just 46% of the population.

== See also ==
- National Institute of Statistics (Italy)
- NUTS statistical regions of Italy
- Italian NUTS level 1 regions:
  - Northwest Italy
  - Northeast Italy
  - South Italy
  - Insular Italy
- Central Italy
- Southern Italy
- Padanian nationalism
