= Pre-Christian Alpine traditions =

The central and eastern Alps of Europe are rich in folklore traditions dating back to pre-Christian times, with surviving elements originating from Germanic, Gaulish (Gallo-Roman), Slavic (Carantanian) and Raetian culture.

== Survival through the ages ==
Ancient customs survived in the rural parts of Austria, Switzerland, Bavaria, Slovenia, western and northern Croatia and north eastern Italy in the form of dance, art, processions, rituals and games. The high regional diversity results from the mutual isolation of Alpine communities. In the Alps, the relationship between the Roman Catholic Church and paganism has been an ambivalent one. While some customs survived only in the remote valleys inaccessible to the church's influence, other customs were actively assimilated over the centuries. In light of the dwindling rural population of the Alps, many customs have evolved into more modern interpretations.

== Pastoral traditions ==
Around September 8, the feast of the Nativity of Mary, it is customary to bring the cattle down from the upland pastures for the winter. In Bavaria, women weave fir wreaths decorated with paper roses and small mirrors to ward off demons during the downhill journey. It has been suggested that this may have been derived from end-of-summer festivals for the Germanic goddess Iðunn; however, it is also appropriate that shepherds would have come down from the alps on the feast of the birth of Mary as Saint Joachim did on hearing it heralded by an angel while sheltering among Jewish shepherds.

== Winter traditions ==
=== Krampus ===
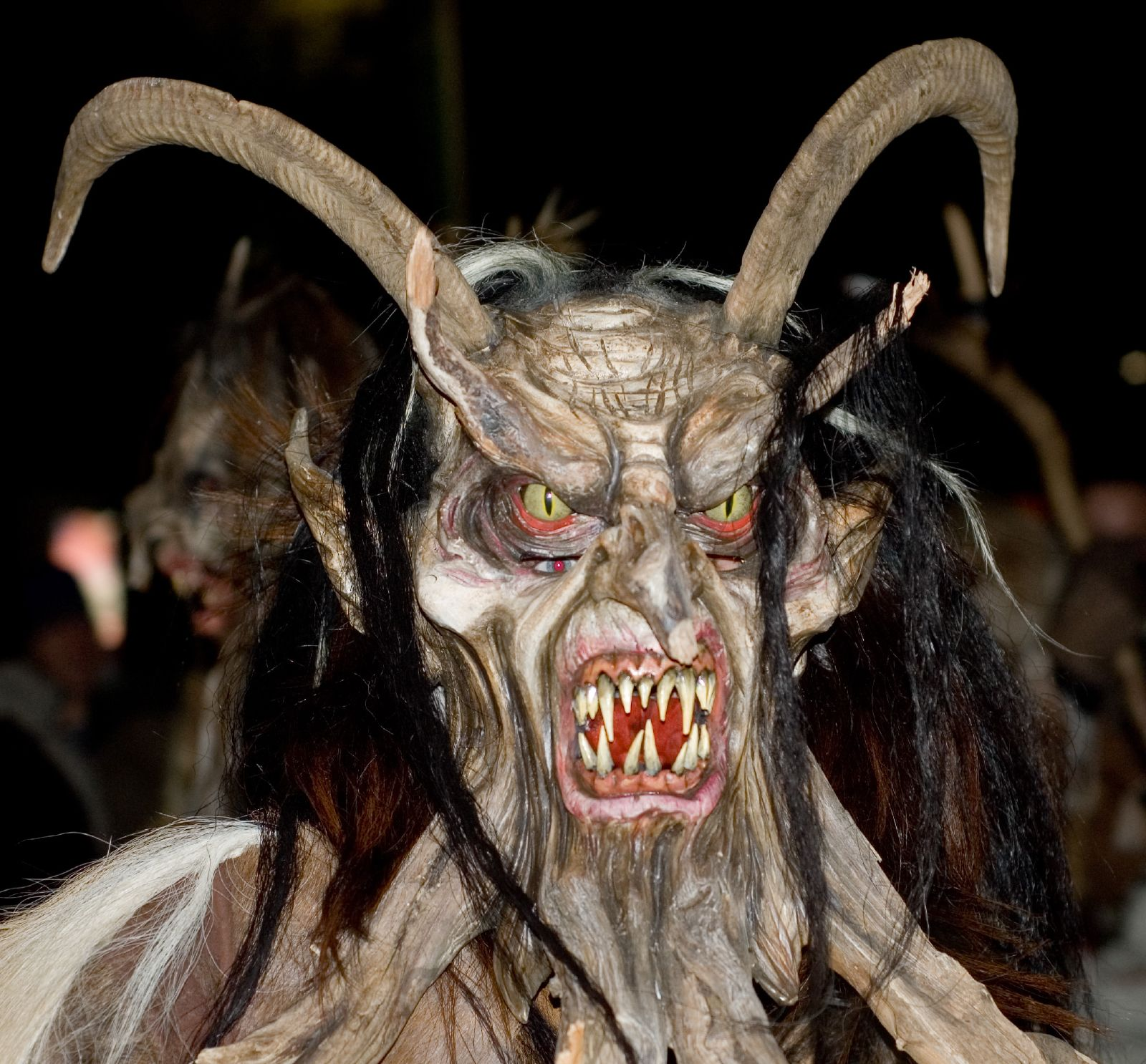
Krampus

The word Krampus originates from the Old High German word for claw (Krampen). In the Alpine regions, the Krampus is a mythical horned figure represented as accompanying Saint Nicholas. Krampus acts as an anti–Saint Nicholas, who, instead of giving gifts to good children, gives warnings and punishments to the bad children. Traditionally, young men dress up as the Krampus in the first two weeks of December, particularly in the evening of December 5, and roam the streets frightening children and women with rusty chains, hammers and bells. This figure is believed to originate from stories of house spirits such as kobolds or elves.

=== Perchten ===
Originally, the word Perchten (plural of Perchta) referred to the female masks representing the entourage of an ancient goddess, Frau Perchta, or Pehta Baba as it is known in Slovenia. Some claim a connection to the Germanic goddess Frija (Frigg), though this is uncertain. Traditionally, the masks were displayed in processions (Perchtenlauf) during the last week of December and first week of January, and particularly on January 6. The costume consists of a brown wooden mask and brown or white sheep's skin. In recent times Krampus and Perchten have increasingly been displayed in a single event, leading to a loss of distinction of the two. Perchten are associated with midwinter and the embodiment of fate and the souls of the dead. The name originates from the Old High German word peraht ("brilliant" or "bright").

Sometimes, der Teufel is viewed to be the most schiach ("ugly") Percht (masculine singular of Perchten) and Frau Perchta to be the most schön ("beautiful") Perchtin (female singular of Perchten).

== Spring traditions ==
Chalandamarz is an ancient festival celebrated by the Romansh speaking part of the Swiss Canton Graubünden. It is celebrated on the first of March and marks the end of winter and the arrival of spring. Its object is to scare away the evil spirits of winter and wake up the good spirits of spring.

== Badalisc ==
The Badalisc is a "good" mythological animal who lives in the woods of Andrista, in Val Camonica, Italy. During an annual town festival someone dresses up as the creature and is "captured" and brought to the town. The animal is made to tell the people of the town gossip. At the end of the festival the creature is released until the next year's ceremony.

== Gallery ==
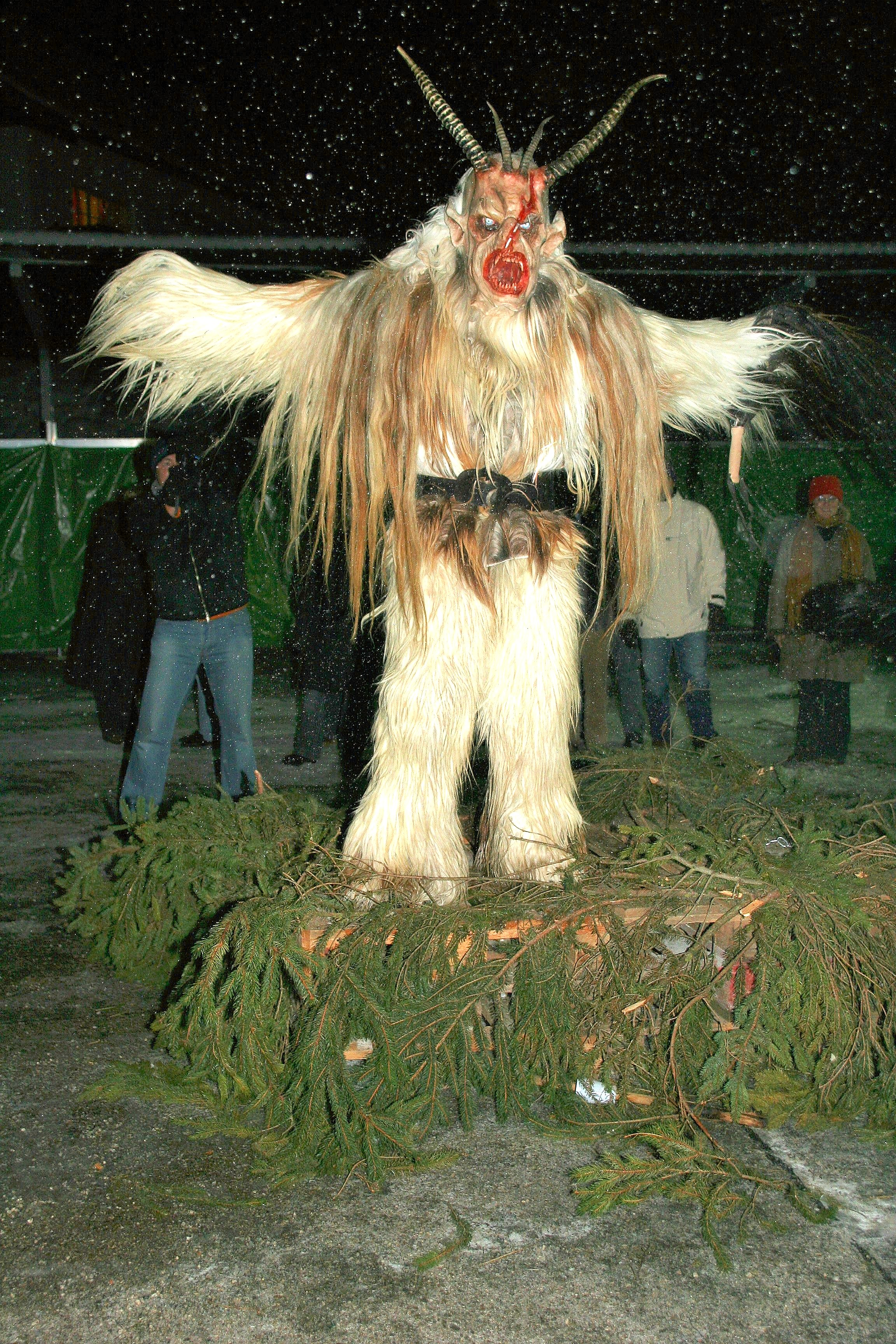
Krampus

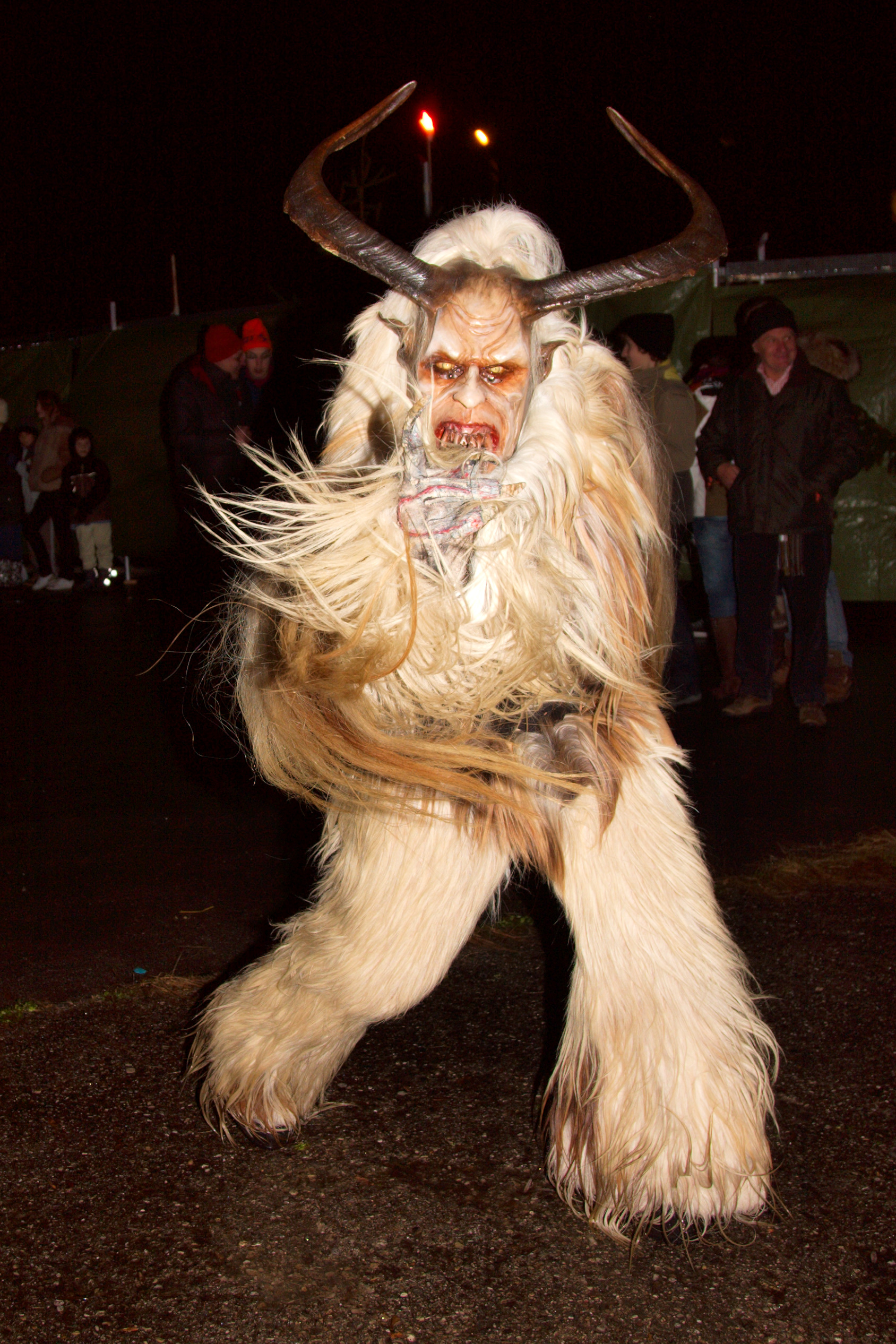
Krampus, Salzburg 2008

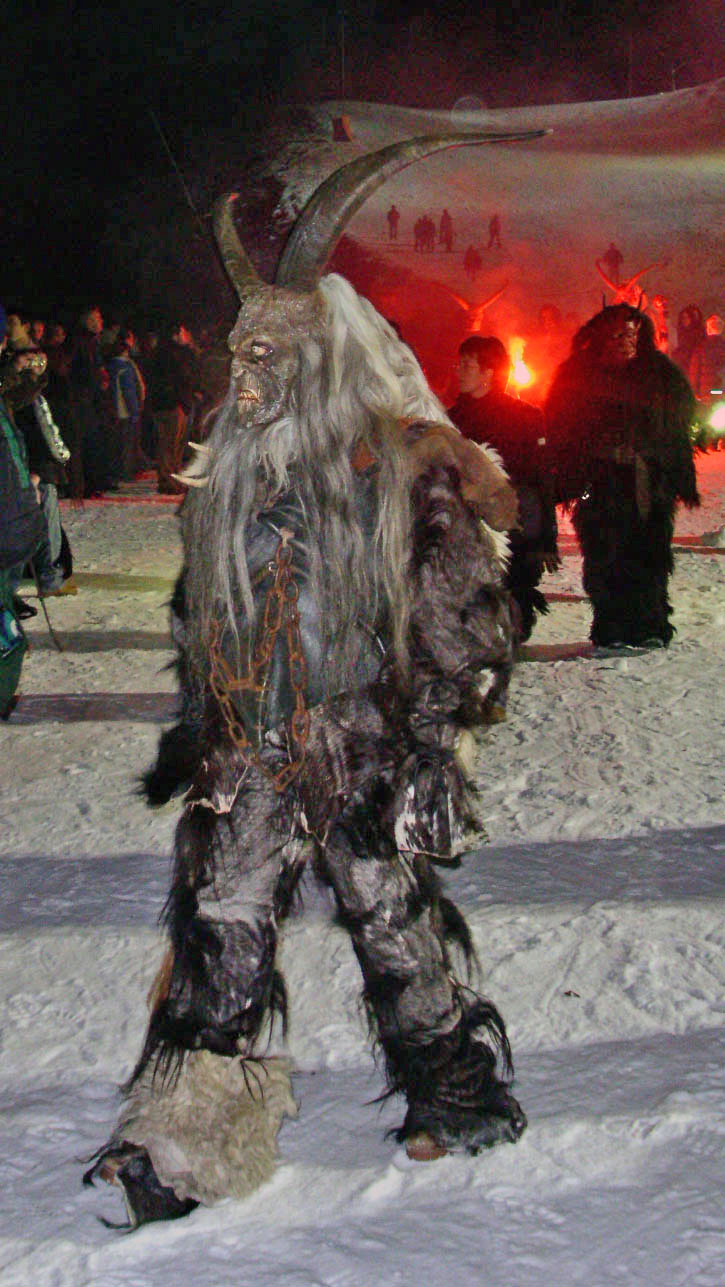
Procession in Klagenfurt

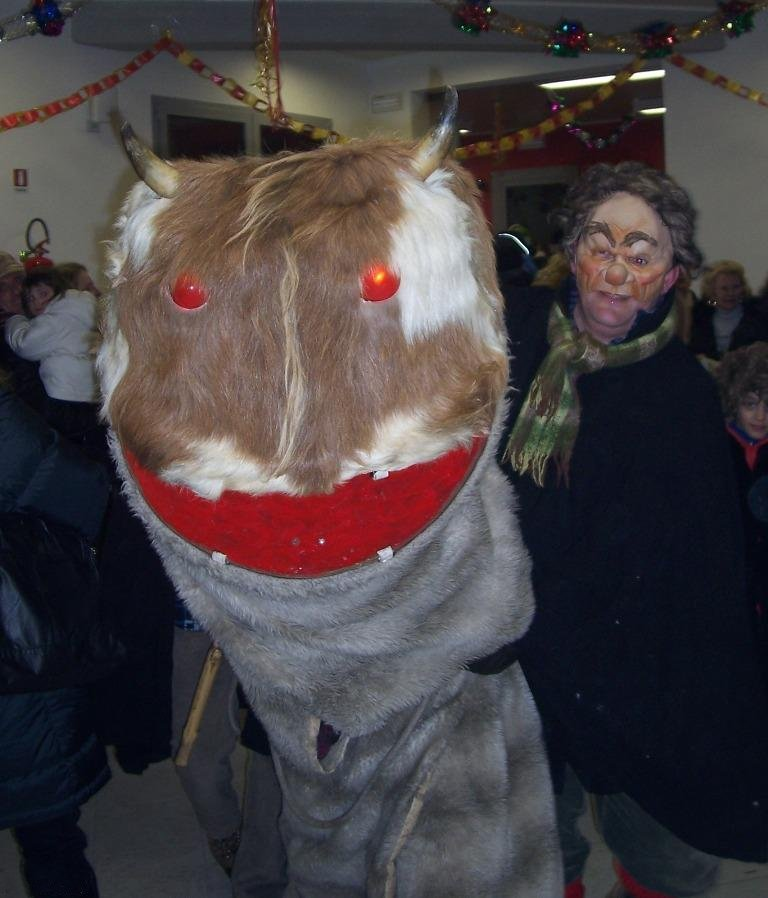
The Badalisc in Val Camonica

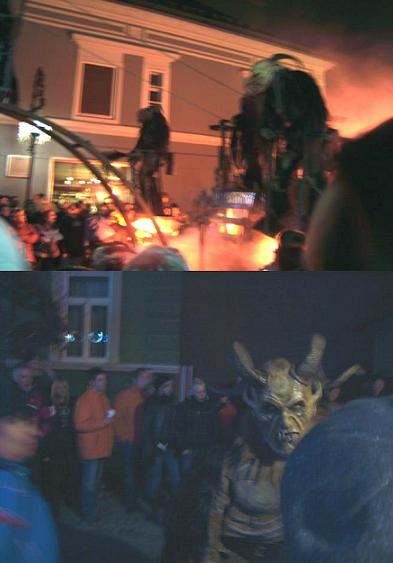
Procession in Leibnitz (Austria)

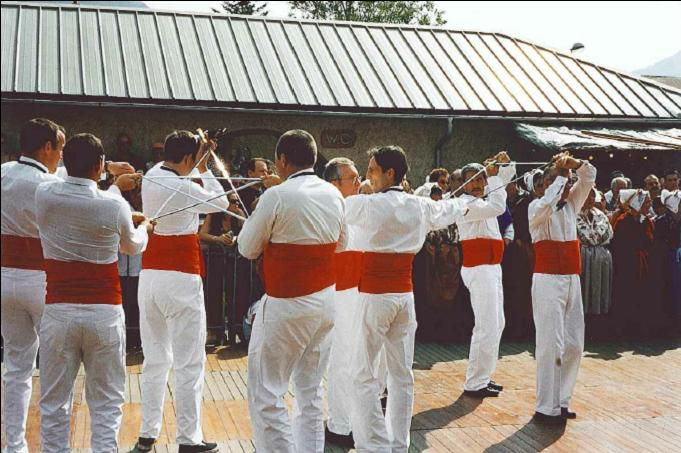
The Bacchu-ber, a sword dance, in Pont-de-Cervières (France)

== See also ==
- Kallikantzari
- Berchtoldstag
- Fasnacht
- Funkenfeuer
- Busójárás
- Kurentovanje
- La Vijanera
- Zvončari
- History of the Alps
- Transhumance in the Alps
- Rhaetians
- Alemanni
- Swiss folklore
- Continental Germanic mythology
- Pre-Christian traditions of the Low Countries
- Companions of Saint Nicholas
- Namahage
