= Badalisc =

Mythical creature of the Val Camonica, Italy

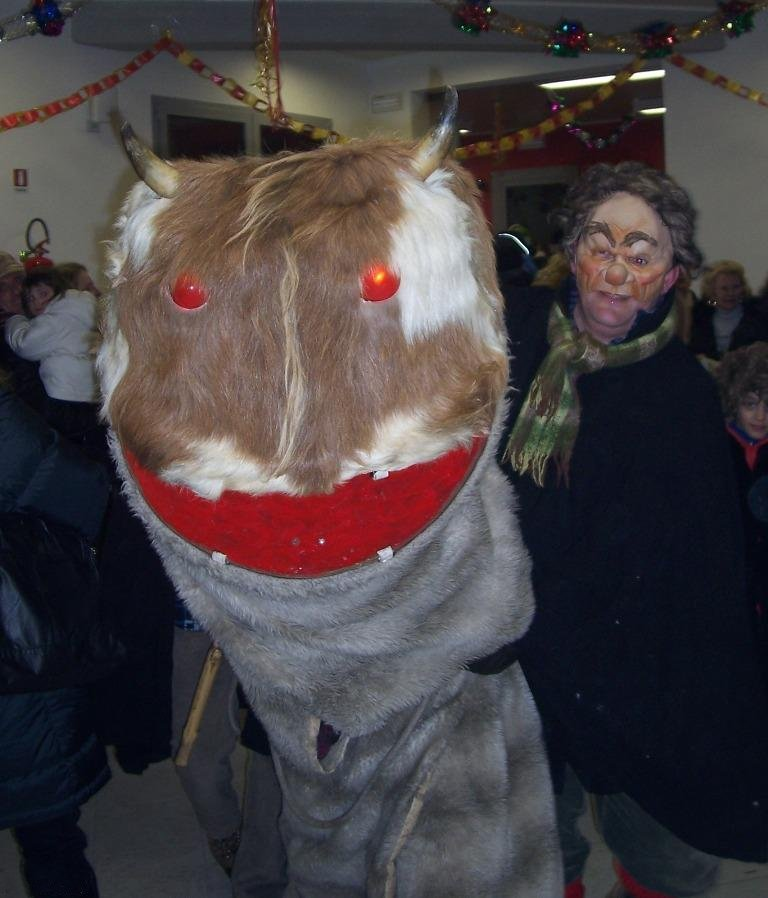
- Badalisc of Andrista

Creature information
- Other name(s): Badalisk, Badalisch
- Similar entities: Turoń, Old Tup
- Folklore: Italy

Origin
- Country: Italy
- Region: Andrista in Val Camonica, Central Alps
- Habitat: Alps

The Badalisc (Lombard: Badalisch, pronounced [badaˈlisk]) is a mythical creature of the Val Camonica, Italy, in the southern central Alps. The Badalisc is represented today as a creature with a big head covered with a goat skin, two small horns, a huge mouth and glowing eyes.

== The celebration ==
According to legend the Badalisc lives in the woods around the village of Andrista (commune of Cevo) and is supposed to annoy the community: each year it is captured during Epiphany's eve (5th January, the Twelfth Night) and led on a rope into the village by masked characters, including il domatore, gli spazzavia (the sweepers), il vecchio (the old man), la vecchia (the old woman) and the young signorina (the maiden), who is "bait" for the animal's lust, and the hunters.

Traditionally only men take part, although some are dressed as women.

In the village square (formerly in a stable) the Badalisc's speech ( 'ntifunade) is read, in which the mythological animal gossips about the community. The Badalisc itself is a dumb creature, so the speech, nowadays written in rhyme, is read by an "interpreter". Once improvised, now written in advance, the speech reveals all the supposed sins and scheming of the community. During the speech the hunchback bangs his stick rhythmically at intervals.

The speech is followed by singing, dancing and feasting. In the evening the community eats the "Badalisc polenta" (a commercial version of this traditional food was launched in 2010). Until recently, village children would beg from house to house during the Badalisc celebrations for cornmeal to make the polenta; a Badalisc salami was also specially made for them. The badalisc has a place of honour at the feasts.

On the second day, at the end of the exhibition, the Badalisc is set free and allowed to return to the woods.

== Related customs ==
The ritual has strong similarities with the Bosinada, Bosinade or Businade, satirical performances of prose, poetry or song, in which a storyteller (the Bosin) denounced the misdeeds of the community. Known from the 16th century, these were once widespread throughout northern Italy and derived from the purification rituals of New Year's Eve.

Any link between the Badalisk of Andrista and the mythical Basilisk (half lizard, half serpent, with a head like a cat, but squarer, like a toad) that incinerates everything on which it rests its gaze (well known in Cevo and elsewhere in northern Italy) is unclear.

== Gallery ==
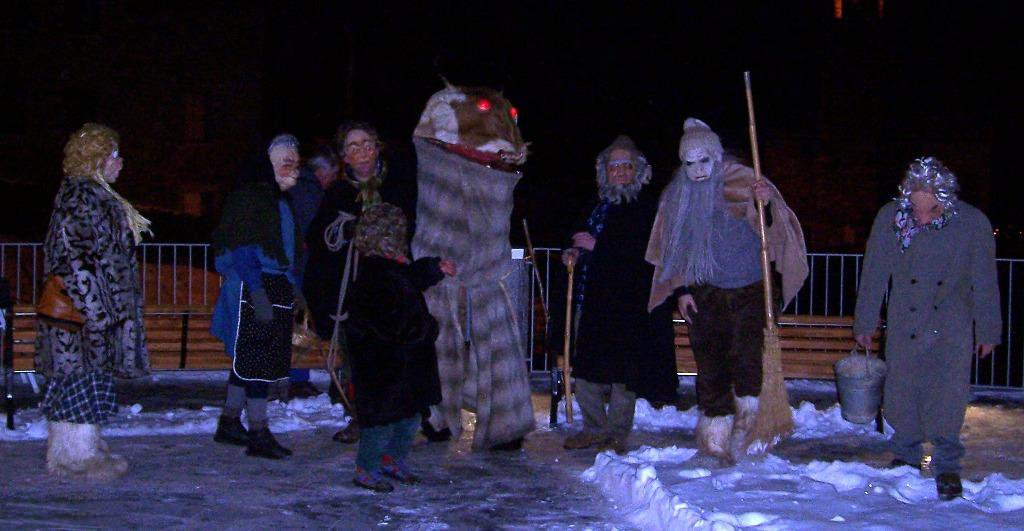
The capture of the Badalisc

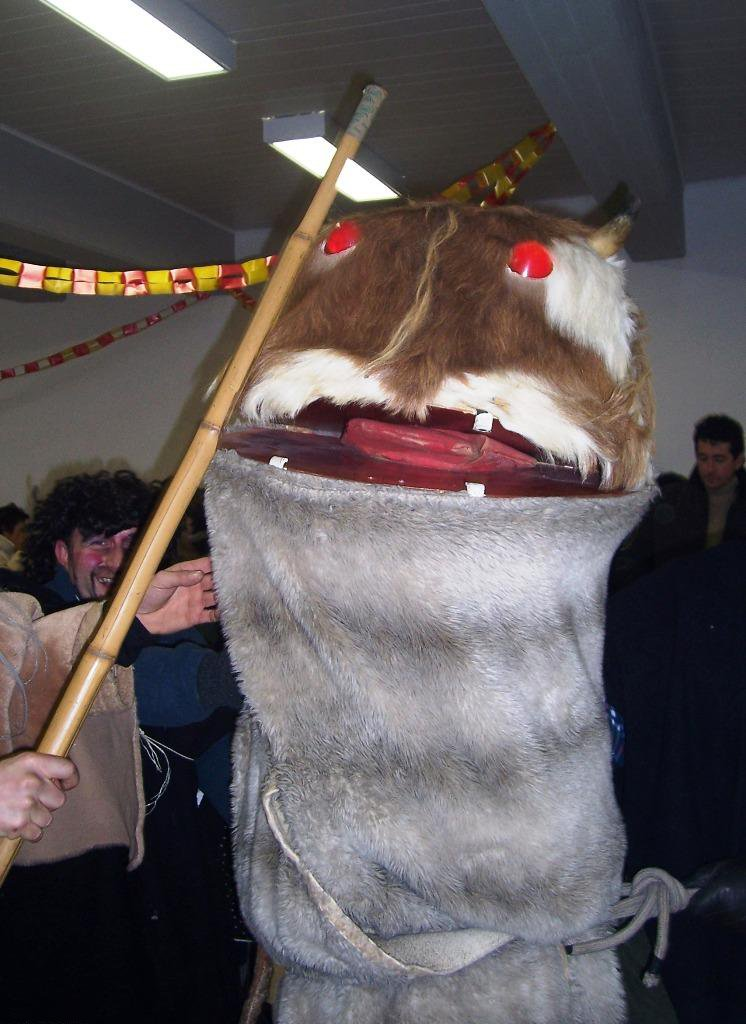
The Badalisc

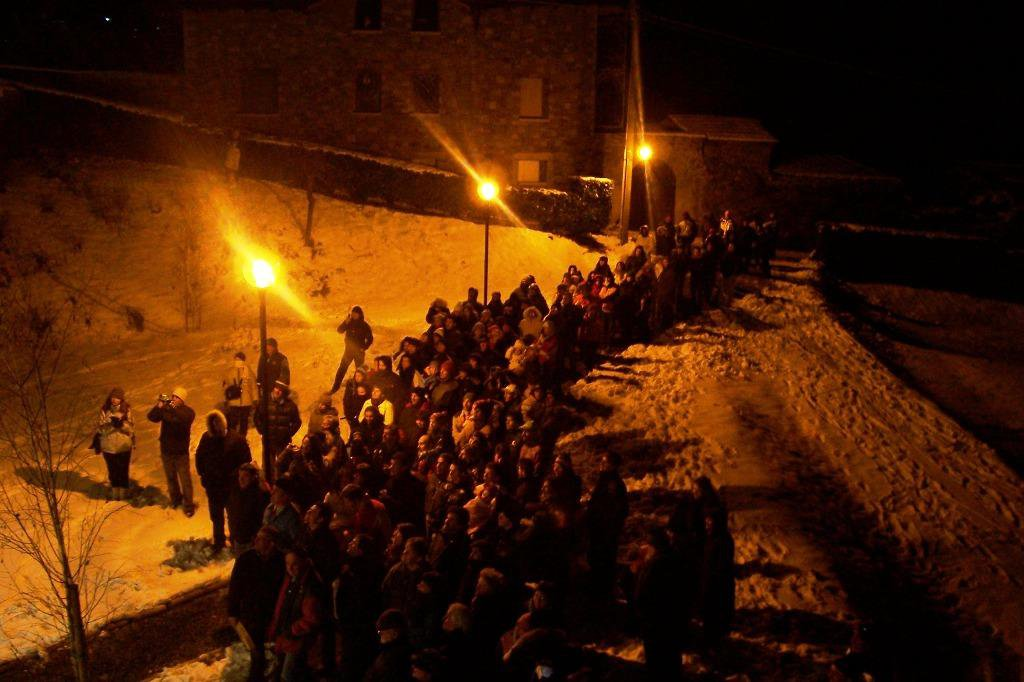
People listening to the "Badalisc's speech"

== See also ==
- Perchta
- Krampus
- Pre-Christian Alpine traditions

== Bibliography ==
- Luca Giarelli, Il Badalisc di Andrista: maschera di Cevo in Valle Camonica, in Carnevali e folclore delle Alpi. Riti, suoni e tradizioni popolari delle vallate europee, 2012, ISBN 978-88-6618-948-0.
