= History of Legnano =

History of Legnano, Italy

Coat of arms of Legnano

Legnano, an Italian municipality of the Metropolitan City of Milan in the Alto Milanese, has a recorded history from the first mention of the Legnarello district to the present day.

During the Middle Ages, Legnano was the site of an important battle wherein the Lombard League defeated Frederick Barbarossa. Because of that battle, Legnano is the only city other than Rome, capital of Italy, to be mentioned in the national anthem.

Industry has had significant impact on Legnano's history and the municipality remains one of the most developed and industrialized in Italy.

== Geological history ==
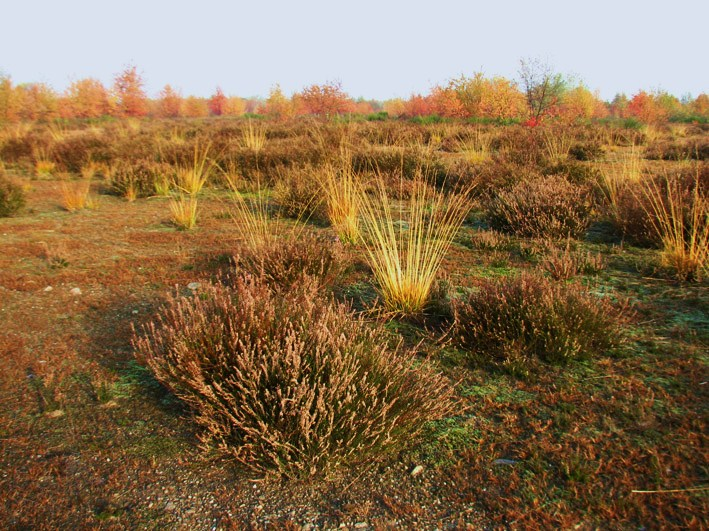
The Brughiera, near the Malpensa Farmhouse, for which the Milan Malpensa Airport was named, in autumn.

From the Paleozoic to the Cenozoic Eras, the area to be Legnano was below sea level. The primordial ocean blanketed the municipal area in many different layers of sediment. The largest factor in the creation of Legnano's geography is the glaciation in northern Italy during the Quaternary period. It was during this period that the fertile alluvial plain of the Po Valley was formed by glaciers and later the rivers of the Alps and Prealps. In the Legnano area, the Olona river was the executor of this later sedimentary process. The result of this process in Legano was a moorland characterized by poor fertility due to a lack of humus and the presence of dry and stony soil. The largest plant life in the area to be found were Calluna shrubs, known locally as brugo; this is the origin of Brughiera, the name for the local moorland.

With the arrival of humans, the soil was made fertile serviceable by the labor of farmers and the digging of irrigation channels such as acequia. Following these alterations, cultivated fields and forests spread over Legnano. These forests comprised plane, ash, common oak, hornbeam, chestnut, common hazel, poplar, elm, maple, and alder.

== Etymology ==
The toponymy of the name "Legnano" is uncertain, as the early settlement was known by several names, but it is obvious that Legnano's name is older than that of the surrounding municipalities. "Legnano" could have originated as a predial adjective, formed from the name of the most prominent landowner in the area. In Legnano's case, this landowner's name could have been Lemennius or Limenius, to which was adjoined the suffix -anum. This would confirm the complete Latinization of the Legnano area; in other places where Celtic influence was still substantial, the suffix -acum would have been used. Thus, Lemoniano, Leminiano or Lemegniano, later to become Limnianum and finally Legnanum.

Another theory advances that one of the names that Legnano was known by in the Middle Ages, Ledegnanum, derives from the name for the region, Latinanium. Therefore, any suppositions linking the name of the city to the Celtic toponym Lemonianum ("place of the sacred grove") or the predial adjective Laenianum, referring to a potential landowner named Laenius are false.

== Prehistory ==
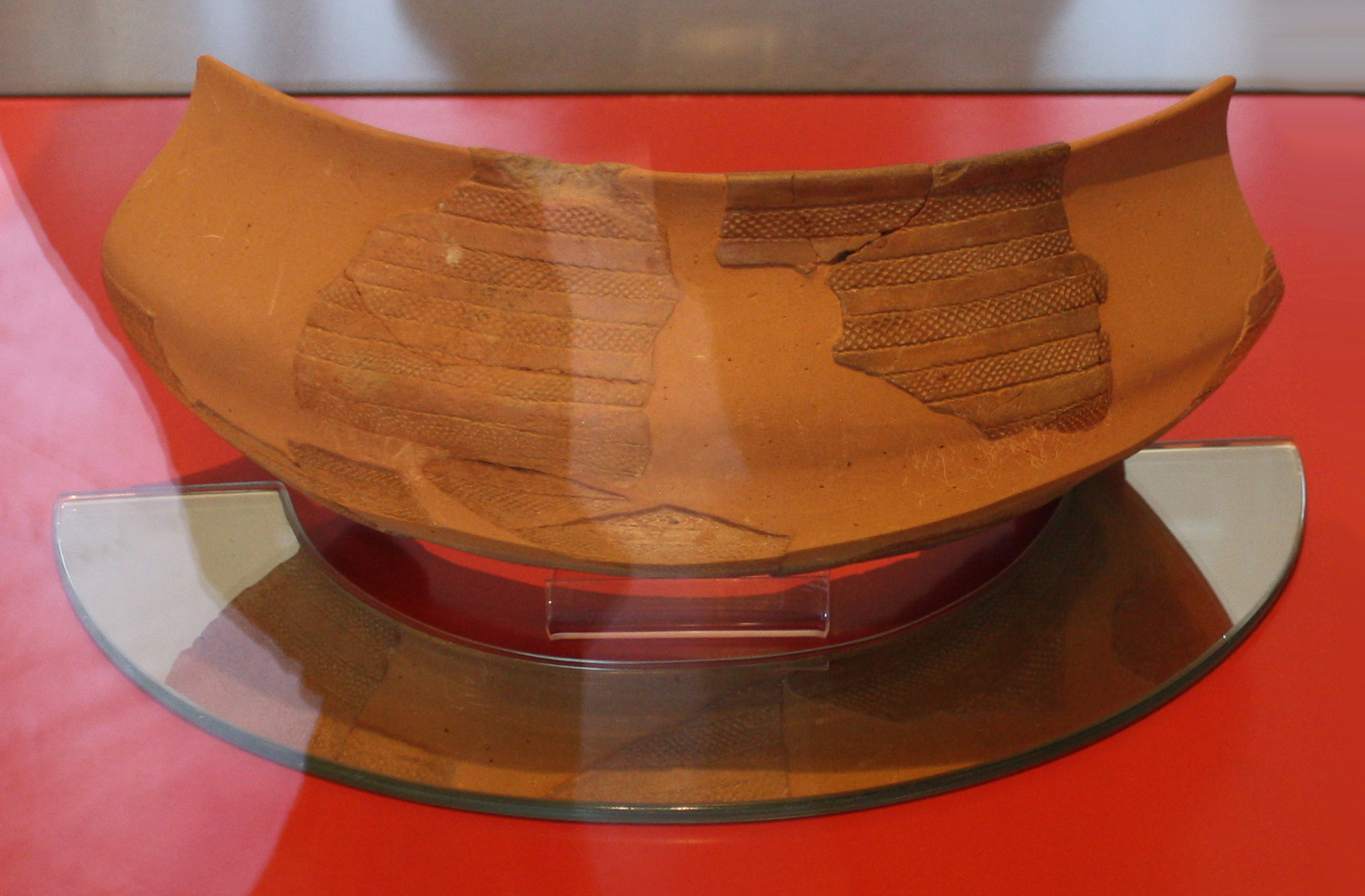
A fragment of a bell-shaped vase made by the Remedello culture

The very earliest settlers in the Legnano area lived at a distance from the Olona so that its frequent flooding would not impair them. The most important archaeological finds in the area from before the Roman period were discovered in the slopes of the Olona valley. Excavations in this area uncovered numerous necropoli, usually bedecked with everyday items as grave goods. These early inhabitants are thought to have come from the Lagozza di Besnate site or from other stilt house cultures on the Varese lakes.

The oldest finds in general in the municipal area are aurochs bones dated to the Würm glaciation, discovered in the San Giorgio area and now displayed at the Guido Sutermeister Civic Museum in Legnano. The oldest man-made find was made by Guido Sutermeister during excavations between 1926 and 1928 in the Legnanese, alongside miscellaneous Roman finds. The item, a fragment of a bell-shaped vase (pictured), made by the Remedello culture between 3400 BC to 2200 BC. The location of the discovery was a construction site for State Road 527 Bustese, near the municipal border with Castellanza. Although the nature of the relationship between the peoples along the Olona and the Remedello culture are unknown, it has been assumed they had commercial links.

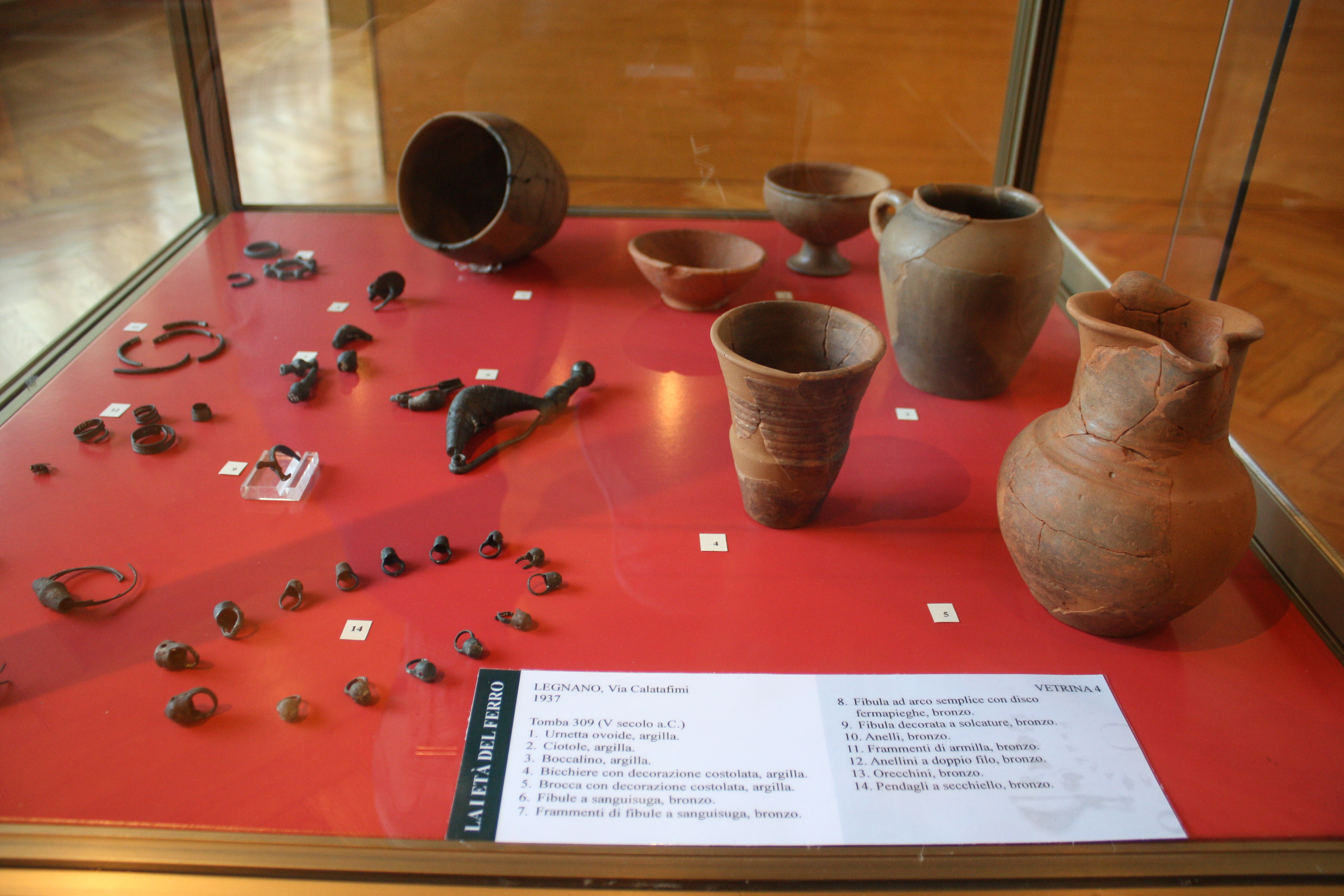
Finds dated to the Golasecca culture found in 1937

In the area of Legnano are found no traces of the early Bronze Age; there have been no finds made dated to between 2200 BC and 1400 BC. The next chronological find is from 800 years after the synthesis of the Remedello fragment, attributed to the Canegrate culture. Investigatory excavations found some 200 tombs, dated to the 13th century BC, and other finds that showed development until the Iron Age. Having been discovered in nearby Canegrate, these finds are definite evidence of prehistoric peoples in the area of present-day Legnano.

In the 1980s, dwellings dated from the 12th to the 10th centuries BC were discovered between Legnano and Castellanza. Archaeologists conjectured that these dwellings had stone foundations, wooden walls, and roofs made of several layers of dried leaves. Various household items were also discovered in these dwellings.

Two bronze spearheads dated to the 9th and 8th centuries BC were discovered in 1892 and 1895 near Legnano. They have been attributed to the Golasecca culture. More Golasecca finds, this time household items, were discovered in 1925 and 1937 and were dated to the 5th and 4th centuries BC. In the course of these excavations, two more necropoli were unearthed that contained yet more household goods as well as funerary urns.

=== Pre-Roman population ===
An excavation along the State Road 33 Sempione uncovered two bronze items of the Celtic La Tène culture dated to between the 4th and 1st centuries BC. Other digs, even on small-scale, have unearthed numerous items corresponding to this culture throughout the Alto Milanese. No finds connected to either the Etruscans or Adriatic Veneti have been made.

Strong Celtic influence is extent even in finds dated to the period after the Roman conquest of the Po Valley, only disappearing in the reign of Emperor Augustus.

== Roman Empire ==
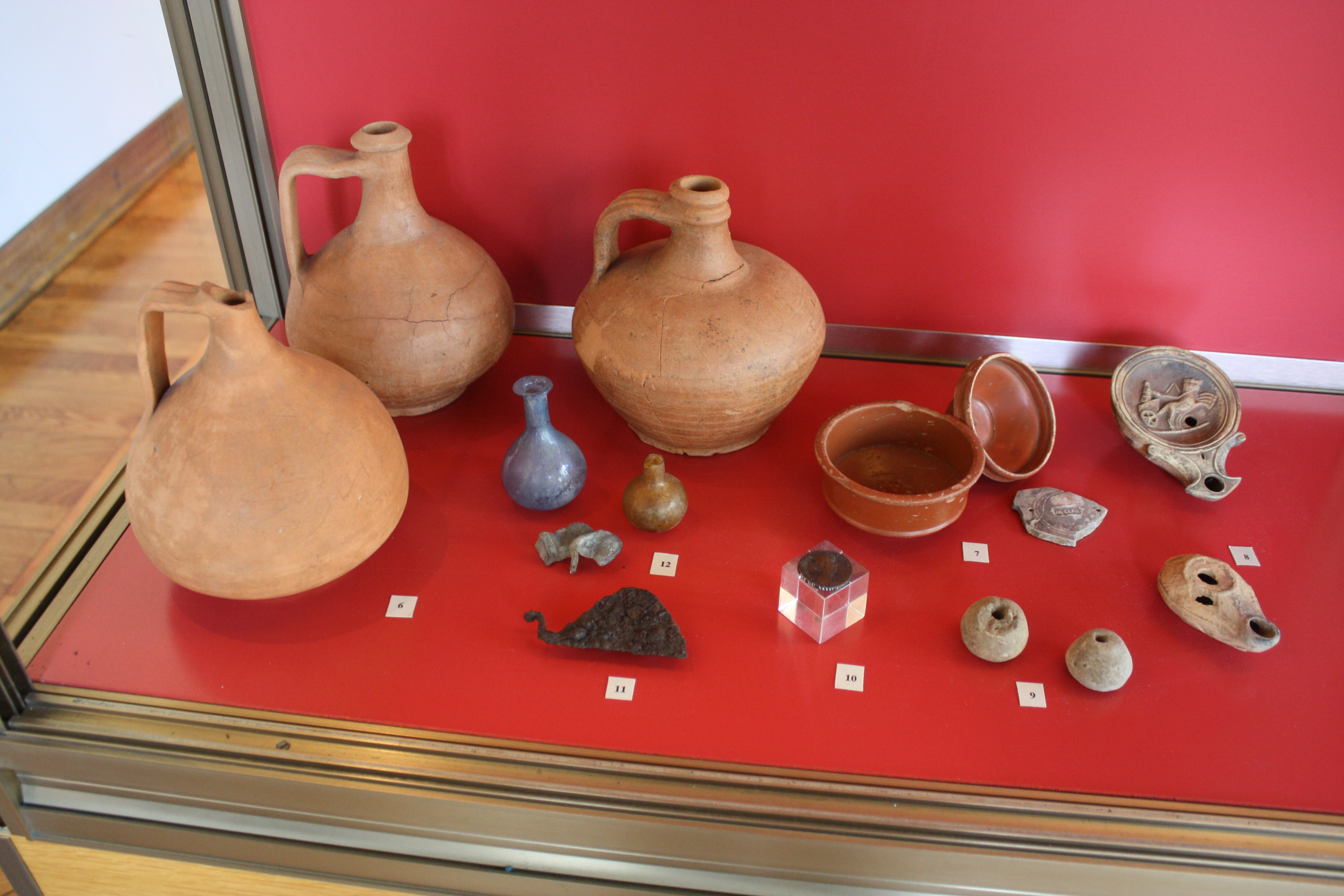
Findings from the 2nd century AD found between 1957 and 1960

The romanization of the Legnano area took place slowly, as the Empire allowed the locals to continue speaking their language, worship their own gods, and practice their culture.

In Roman times, the inhabitants of the Legnano area were part of a vicus, as evidenced by abundant archaeological finds. Those discoveries were generally of poor quality, suggesting that the Legnano vicus was inhabited by poor citizenry. This is contrasted by the finds in nearby Parabiago, especially the Parabiago Plate. The Legnano vicus findings also suggested an agricultural character, particularly farming, husbandry, and weaving. The finds date from the 1st century BC to the 4th century AD suggest that the vicus was continuously inhabited. Legnano experienced socio-economic decline with the rest of the Roman Empire in its twilight years. With the arrival of Christianity, the inhabitants of the vicus began to bury rather than cremate their dead.

With the arrival of the Romans, Legnano became permanently inhabited by humans. The Roman vicus belonged to Regio XI Transpadana and sat upon the Mediolanum-Verbannus road, which ran along the Olona.

=== Archaeological finds ===
Archaeological evidence of Roman activity in Legnano is plentiful, beginning in the 2nd century BC with the Roman conquest of the region. From the amount and type of goods found in the middle Olona valley, it has been assumed that it was part of an important route of communication.

Numerous excavations in the 19th and 20th centuries found numerous Roman furnishings distributed evenly through the vicus. Among the items found, and now displayed at the Sutermeister Civic Museum, are portions of walls, terracotta piping, tiles, and bricks, necropoli, and household ceramic, glass, and metal objects, and currency.

The most important finds were made in 1925–26 between the Via Venegoni and the Via Firenze. These are coins, plates and cups, unguentaria, mirrors, and iron tools in a graveyard. The coins dated these finds to the reigns of Augustus and Caligula, or the 1st centuries BC and AD. Another dig in this same place in 1997 discovered goods from the 2nd and 4th centuries AD. Another 36 graves were discovered along the Via Micca that consisted to more of the same finds, albeit from the 1st and 2nd centuries AD. More tombs, from the reigns of Licinius and Constantine, were discovered along with their myriad grave goods. Other notable finds from the late antiquity include more coins and some amphorae from the 4th century AD.

== Middle Ages ==
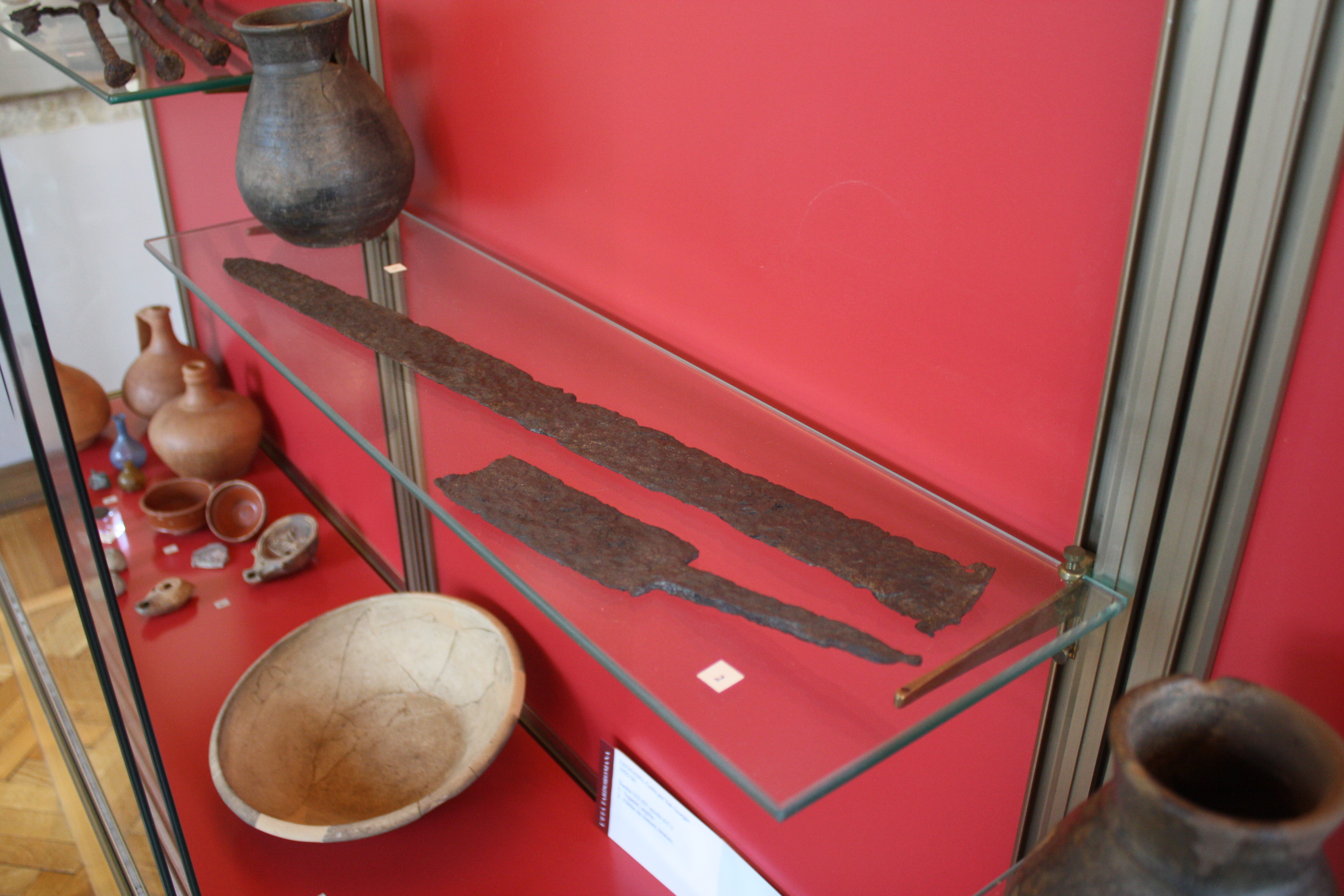
Early medieval finds discovered on the border between Castellanza and Legnano in 1926 from the 7th or 8th centuries AD

With the Migration Period the remaining territories of the Western Roman Empire experienced socio-economic implosion. Among the Germanic peoples migrating into the Roman Empire were the Lombards, who came to dominate Cisalpine Gaul. Their influence, and especially that of their dialect, was to be lasting; legnanese schirpa, a 19th-century term for a dowry, is Lombard in origin. Excavations in the municipal area have at various times revealed Lombard items from the 7th century. Swords and a shield boss were found on the Corso Giuseppe Garibaldi in 1894, a tomb was found in an adjacent area in 1926, and in 1950–51 household items were found near the INA Gallery.

Under the Carolingian Empire, the Legnano area was the border of the counties of Seprio and Burgaria, both part of the Obertenga March. Charlemagne preserved the structure of the Kingdom of the Lombards after defeating it, but replaced the native rulers with Franks. Specifically, the fortification of Castelseprio, founded by the Lombards, was placed at the head of the county of Seprio. Legnano originally gravitated around the latter, although the beginning of the process that would lead the village to be closely linked to Milan also from an economic and military point of view dates from this period.

The first document concerning Legnano was drawn up during Frankish rule and mentions the district of Legnanello. This documented deed refers to an exchange of land between Pietro I Oldrati, archbishop of Milan, and the monastery of Sant'Ambrogio in Milan. This written testimony, which is dated October 23, 789, is included in the Lombard Diplomatic Codex under number LIV. Within it one can read:

[...] with our properties in Legnanello [...] (Latin: [...] curtem proprietatis nostre in Leunianello [...])

— Lombard Diplomatic Codex, Number LIV,

It seems that the ward already existed in 687, when the religious celebration of Candlemas began, which was introduced by Pope Sergius I and was officiated every February 2. It is no coincidence that the document mentioning Legnanello was connected to the monks of St. Ambrose. During the Middle Ages, the monasteries of the most important cities were the reference of the peasants of the smaller villages, to whom they provided protection and support, and the farmers of Legnanello had the monastery of Sant'Ambrogio in Milan as their reference. It is from the period of Frankish rule that the town centers flourished again after the barbarian invasions; Legnano also followed this trend, experiencing a phase of economic growth also thanks to the resumption of trade, which once again took advantage of the ancient Roman road bordering the Olona.

However, the first mention of the main village of Legnano is linked to the capture of Arialdo, leader of the Pataria, which took place inside the Cotta Castle. On the Historia Mediolanensis written by Landulf Senior in the 11th century, which deals with the history of Milan in the Middle Ages, it can be read that Arialdo was captured:

in the vicinity of Legnano
Latin: [...] iuxta locum Legnani [...]

— Historia Mediolanensis

=== Early medieval Legnano ===
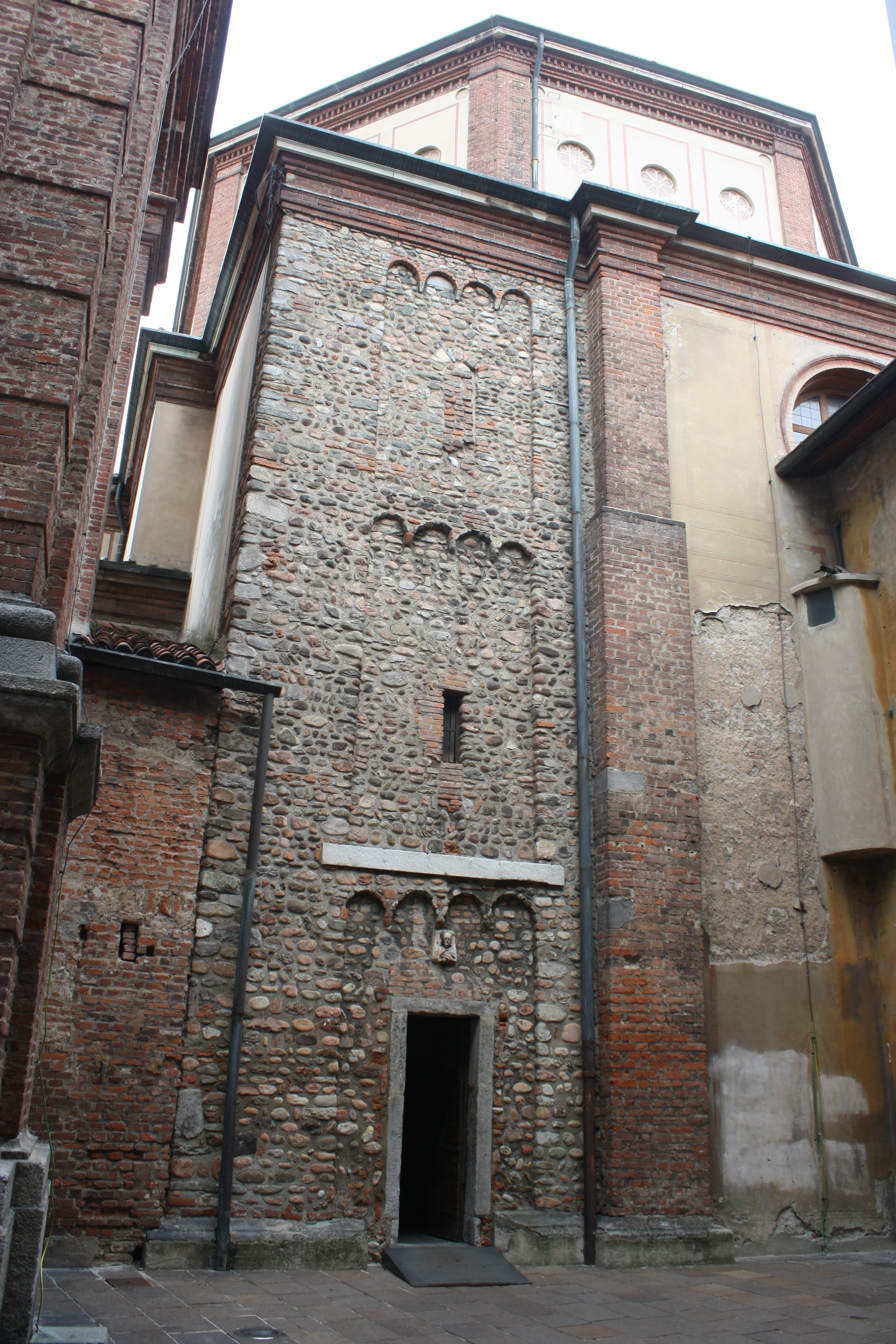
The remains of the Romanesque bell tower of the ancient church of San Salvatore, now incorporated into the basilica of San Magno, where there is a side entrance to the church

Early medieval Legnano was dominated by a fortified palace that had served the people of Legnano as a defense against Hungarian raids and later to defend Leone da Perego Palace, the occasional seat of the archbishop of Milan. The Cotta Castle passed in 1014 to the family of the same name, who fortified it into a real castle and gave it its name; this manor was located on the area occupied by the modern Leone da Perego Palace, which was rebuilt at the end of the 19th century. The Cotta family was closely linked to the archbishop of Milan through the monks of the convent of Sant'Ambrogio; it was the emperor himself who recognized the power over Seprio of this family and their connection with the archbishop.

Legnano, in the early Middle Ages, was surrounded by a not very deep but floodable moat that originated at the height of the modern Piazza 4 Novembre and drew water from a derivation originating from a natural branch of the Olona, the Olonella. Outlining a wide perimeter, the moat flowed back into the main course of the river between modern-day Corridoni and Ratti streets. Within this first defense structure, there was a wall that ran, for a stretch, parallel to the moat. Remains of these fortifications and the Cotta castle were found during two excavation campaigns that took place in the mid-1950s between the erected INA Gallery and an adjacent area located a little further north toward Corso Garibaldi.

In the early Middle Ages Legnano thus appeared as a fortified citadel formed by the church of San Salvatore, i.e., the religious building to which the Legnano community referred before the construction of the basilica of San Magno, the castle of the Cotta family, which was the seat of political power, and a small group of houses gathered around the square, all enclosed by defensive walls and a floodable moat. The shape of the town center of early medieval Legnano was still recognizable from the outline of the city drawn on the map of the Theresian Cadastre, which was made in 1722, while the shape of part of the walls can still be identified in the 21st century by following the route of modern streets Palestro, Giulini and Corridoni.

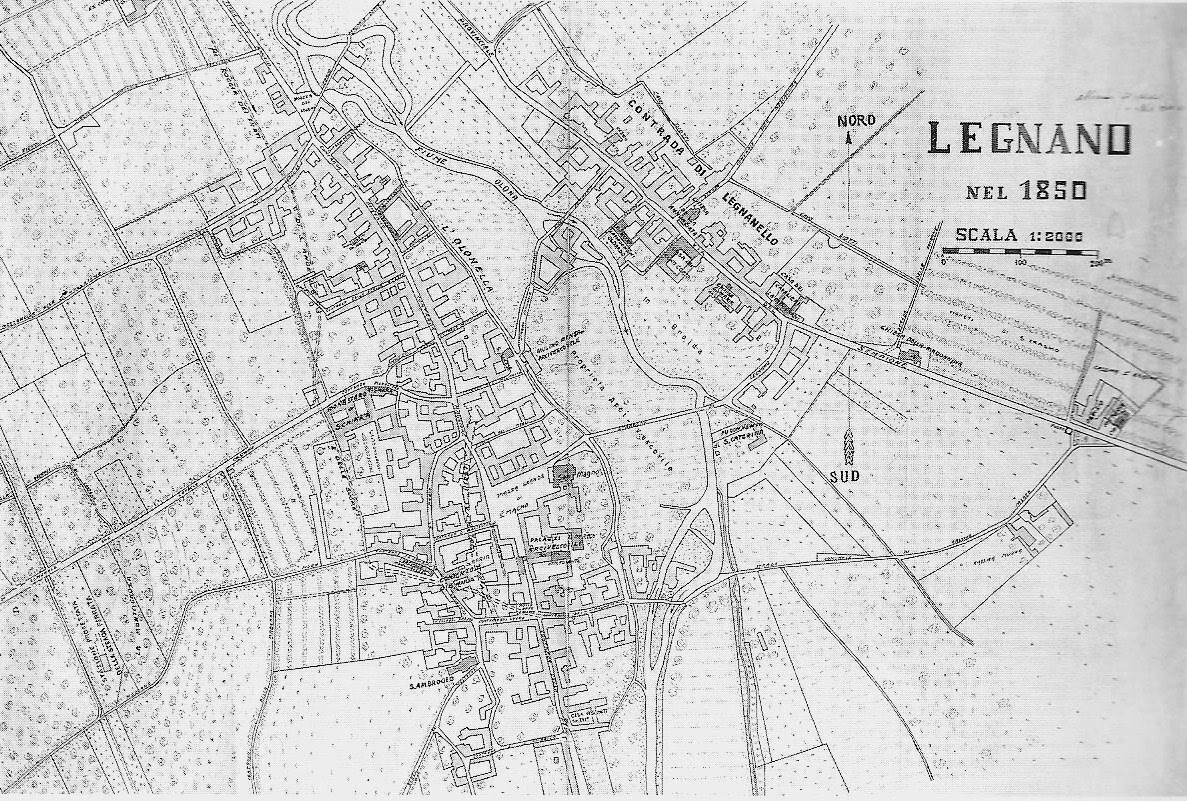
A map of Legnano from 1850: the two settlements of Legnano and Legnanello (still distinct at the time) divided by the Olona and Olonella rivers can still be seen. The two settlements were later welded into a single urban conglomerate with the 20th-century building expansion

As a document dated October 23, 789 testifies, since the time of Frankish rule Legnano was divided into two parts: the larger and more important agglomeration located on the right bank of the Olona River and corresponding to the modern city center (the so-called Contrada Granda, in the dialect of Legnano) and a smaller village, Legnanello, on the left bank of the river. At that time the two communities, which had an independent existence, were in connection thanks to the presence of some bridges. The land between the two settlements, which was crossed by the Olonella and the main course of the Olona, was free and was known as "Braida arcivescovile" being owned by the Archdiocese of Milan; the Braida Arcivescovile remained free of buildings until the 20th century because it was often flooded by the waters of the river.

The Olonella originated from the river just before the main town and, after lapping the main village near the modern basilica of San Magno and Palazzo Malinverni, re-entered the Olona a little further downstream. The Olonella was later buried in the first part of the 20th century. Legnanello at the time consisted of a few houses that were located along the road parallel to the main course of the Olona known since Roman times (the modern Corso Sempione, popularly known, even earlier, as "strada magna"), while the main village consisted of a cluster of dwellings around a square (the modern Piazza San Magno).

In the Middle Ages people began to bury the dead near churches. More precisely, nobles were interred within the perimeter of religious buildings, while the deceased of the general populace were buried in mass graves outside the churches. In the Middle Ages, the Legnano temples that were most affected by this phenomenon were the church of San Martino, the church of Sant'Ambrogio, and especially the church of San Salvatore. Legnano's main cemetery was thus located in the modern Piazza San Magno, and it continued to be used even after the basilica was built. Later a large underground room was built where the dead were interred, known as "the big pit" and which was used until 1808.

=== Late Middle Ages ===
==== Late medieval Legnano ====
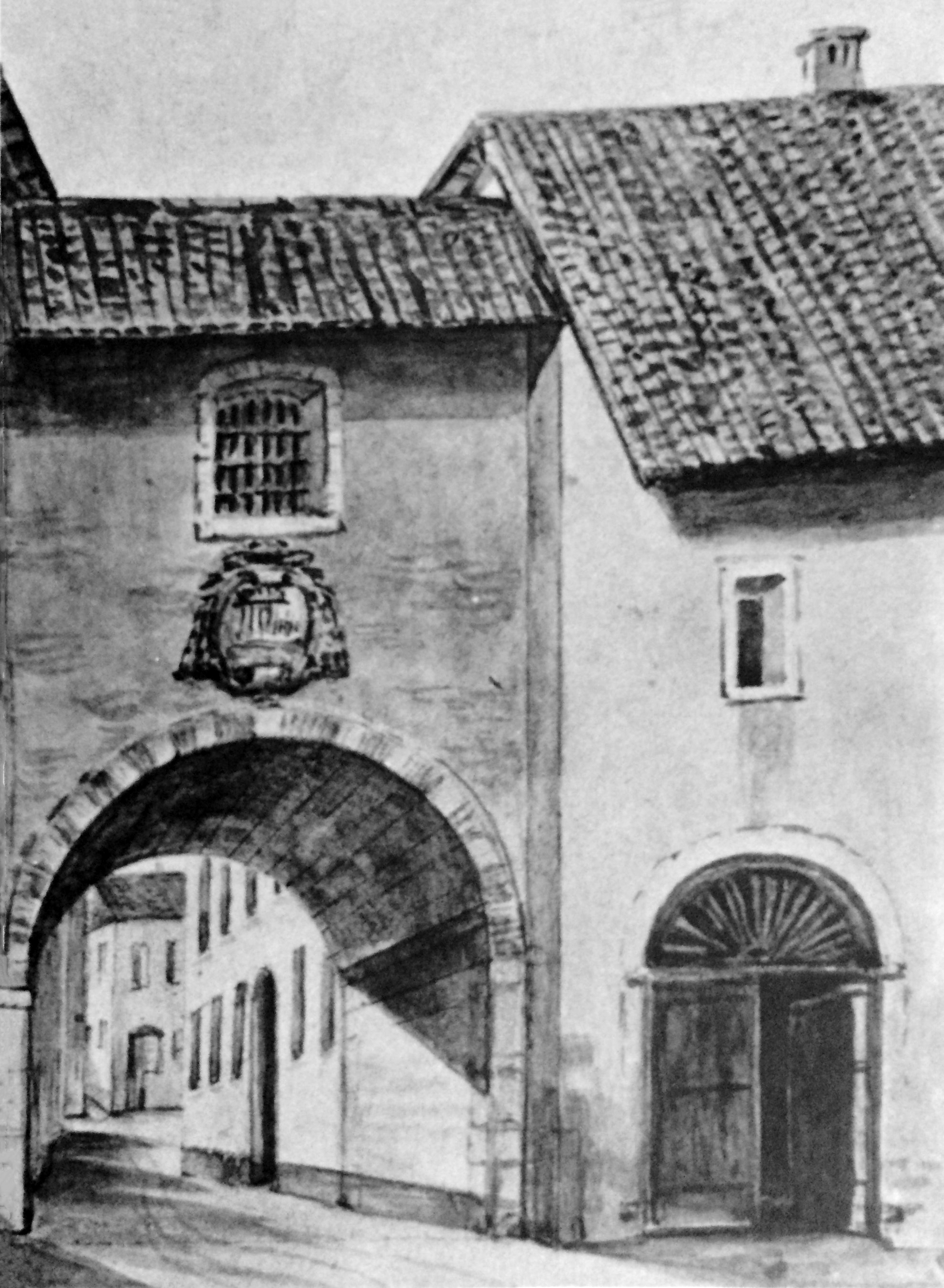
The Porta di Sotto in an 1875 watercolor by Giuseppe Pirovano

The main urban agglomeration of Legnano, even during the Late Middle Ages, began to develop with an elongated shape following the direction traced by a road that constituted, together with the already mentioned road built by the ancient Romans that passed through Legnanello, the main system of communication with the surrounding area. The road passing through the main settlement, which also followed the course of the Olona and corresponds to modern-day Corso Magenta and Corso Garibaldi, crossed the urban agglomeration from north to south; this road came from the Olona valley and connected Castellanza, Legnano, the modern Legnanello district Costa di San Giorgio and Milan; two gates were built at the entrance and exit from Legnano, one of which, known as the "Porta di Sotto," was demolished in 1818 because it made it difficult for farmers' wagons to circulate. It was located south of the town, along the modern Corso Magenta, which at that time was called Via Porta di Sotto, just ahead of the entrance to Palazzo Leone da Perego and near the old Cotta Castle. The "Porta di Sotto," which was embellished with a 16th-century fresco, took the form of an arched opening above which a covered passageway had been carved out, connecting the architectural complex formed by Palazzo Leone da Perego and the adjacent Palazzo Visconti to the Cotta Castle and, after the demolition of the latter, to a building located on the other side of modern-day Corso Magenta. To the north was presumably located a "Porta di Sopra" of which, however, no tangible evidence remains, since it was likely demolished in earlier times.

In the Middle Ages, pilgrims traveling along one of the Roman roads to Milan, the so-called Via Romana, had among their stops the Sant'Erasmo hospice in Legnano. Legnano was the fourth stop from the Simplon Pass and the last before Milan; from the Milanese capital, pilgrims then headed to Rome or Venice, where they could embark for the Holy Land. The Sant'Erasmo hospice thus functioned as a place of shelter, prayer and care for the sick, as well as a hospital and orphanage for the local inhabitants.

As recorded in two lists of churches compiled in 1304 and 1389, there were, in addition to San Salvatore, other buildings dedicated to religious worship in Legnano; specifically, there were the church of Sant'Agnese (which stood in the area occupied by the headquarters of the modern Bank of Legnano and was demolished during the period of construction of the basilica of San Magno), the church of San Martino (which was erected in the same place as the modern one) and the church of Santa Maria del Priorato, to which the convent of the Humiliati was attached. The 1389 list also includes a church dedicated to St. Ambrose, which was located on the same site as the modern one. From the presence of as many as five churches, it can be deduced that Legnano at that time was a rather active and industrious community.

Since the Middle Ages, the village was rich in water mills. The oldest writing that has come down to us in which a milling plant on the Olona River is mentioned is from 1043; this mill, which was owned by Pietro Vismara, was located between Castegnate and the Gabinella locality in Legnano.

Even in the Middle Ages, Legnano was not considered a village, but rather a borgo, that is, a town provided with a fortification and a market. After the medieval period, at a date impossible to define due to the absence of documents testifying to the event, the market in Legnano was closed.

==== The clash with Frederick Barbarossa ====
In the Middle Ages Legnano was the scene of an important battle. In several military campaigns prior to the famous clash, the German emperor Frederick I (known as "Barbarossa") aspired to assert his dominance over the communes of northern Italy. The latter overcame their rivalries by uniting in the Lombard League, i.e., a military alliance chaired by Pope Alexander III, which defeated the Holy Roman Emperor's army near Legnano (May 29, 1176) ending Barbarossa's hegemonic dreams in northern Italy.

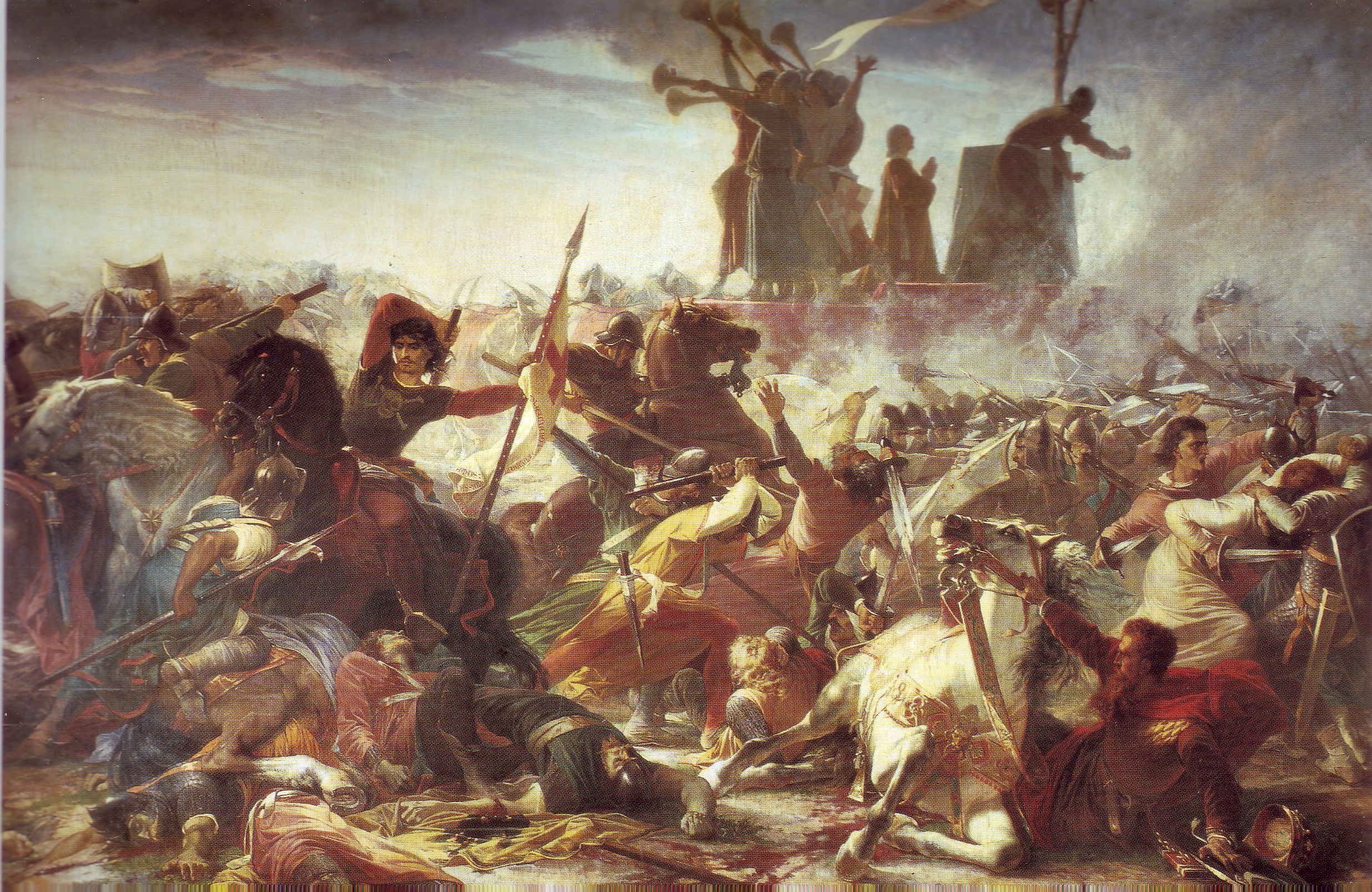
The Battle of Legnano in a painting by Amos Cassioli (1832-1891)

Today it is difficult to determine precisely where the battle was fought. According to the vague information contained in the documents of the time, one can assume a place near the district of San Martino or in the vicinity of the Legnano district of Costa San Giorgio, and thus on territory now also belonging to the municipality of San Giorgio su Legnano. The choice to seek the clash with Barbarossa in Legnano was no accident. At the time, the village represented an easy access to the Milanese countryside for those coming from the north, since it was located at the outlet of the Olona Valley, which ends in Castellanza; this gateway therefore had to be closed and strenuously defended to prevent an attack on Milan, which was also facilitated by the presence of the important road that had existed since Roman times, the Via Severiana Augusta.

Because of this strategic function, Legnano, starting in the 11th century, began to bind itself more and more with Milan even from an economic and military point of view, although it formally belonged to Seprio. Legnano and the other counties that gravitated around the Milanese capital also supplied Milan with foodstuffs. Milan also influenced the Legnano dialect, which began to differentiate itself from the Busto dialect. Due to the frequent contacts between the two cities, the Milanese dialect began to "contaminate" the language spoken in Legnano. Despite this trend, the Legnano dialect continued to retain a certain diversity from the Milanese dialect over the centuries. Legnano's connection with Milan exacerbated friction with Busto Arsizio, which instead continued to be linked to the County of Seprio. The latter was annexed to the Duchy of Milan in 1395.

During this period more and more Milanese noble families began to stay in Legnano at various times of the year and to buy properties in the village. In this way, a rich noble class began to form in Legnano, which at the time of the battle was inhabited by about 1,400 residents; from these lineages, in the following centuries, many personalities who would mark the political and cultural life of Legnano would originate. Among them were the Oldradi (or Oldrendi); the first mention of this family is found on a document dated 1173, where they sign themselves as da Legniano in such a way as to recall and remark their control over the village. From the Oldrendi descended the well-known 14th-century jurist Giovanni da Legnano, who later changed his surname and became the progenitor of the family later called Legnani.

==== Leone da Perego and Bonvesin de la Riva ====
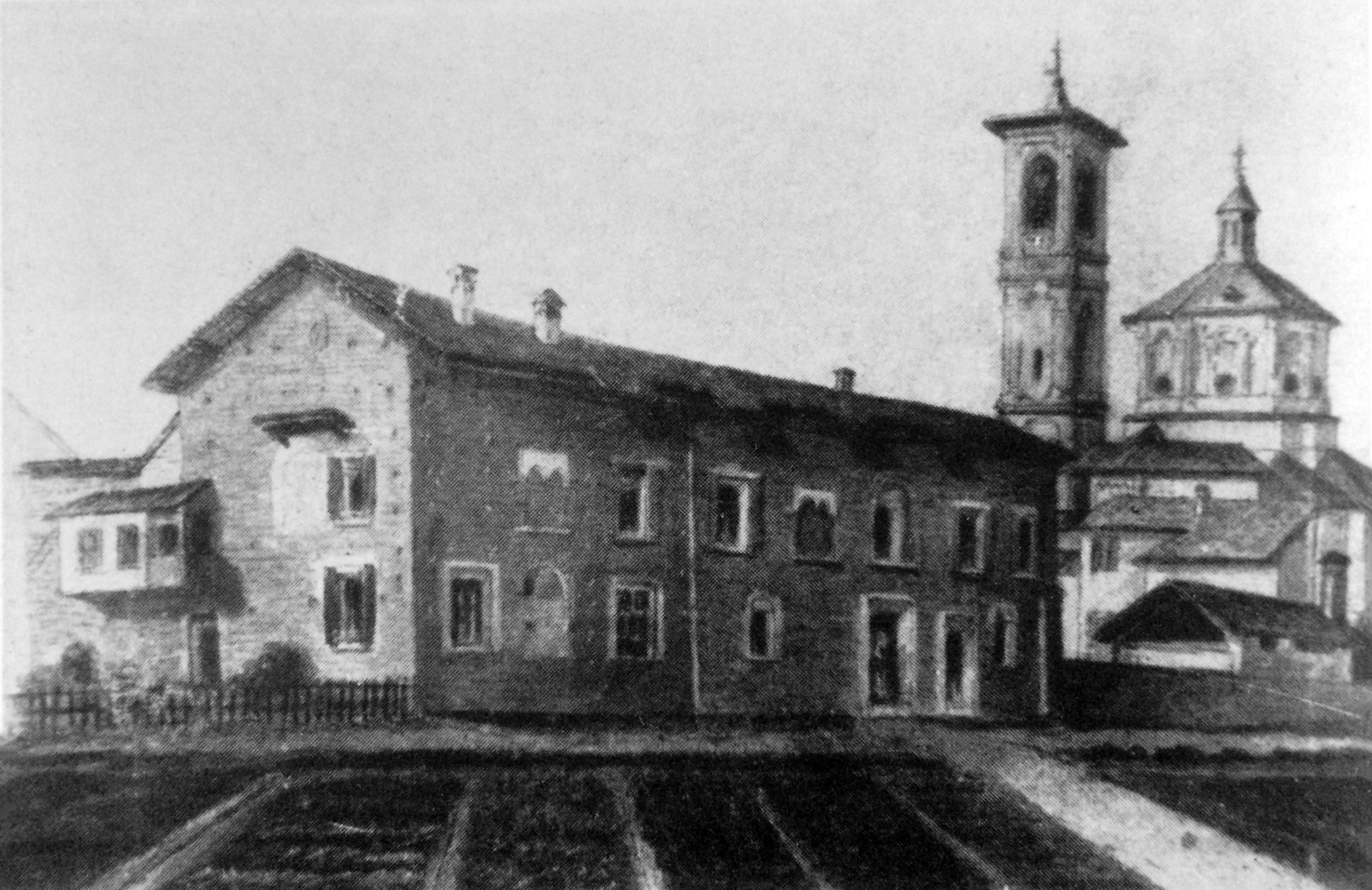
The ancient Leone da Perego palace, founded in the Middle Ages, in a watercolor by Giuseppe Pirovano

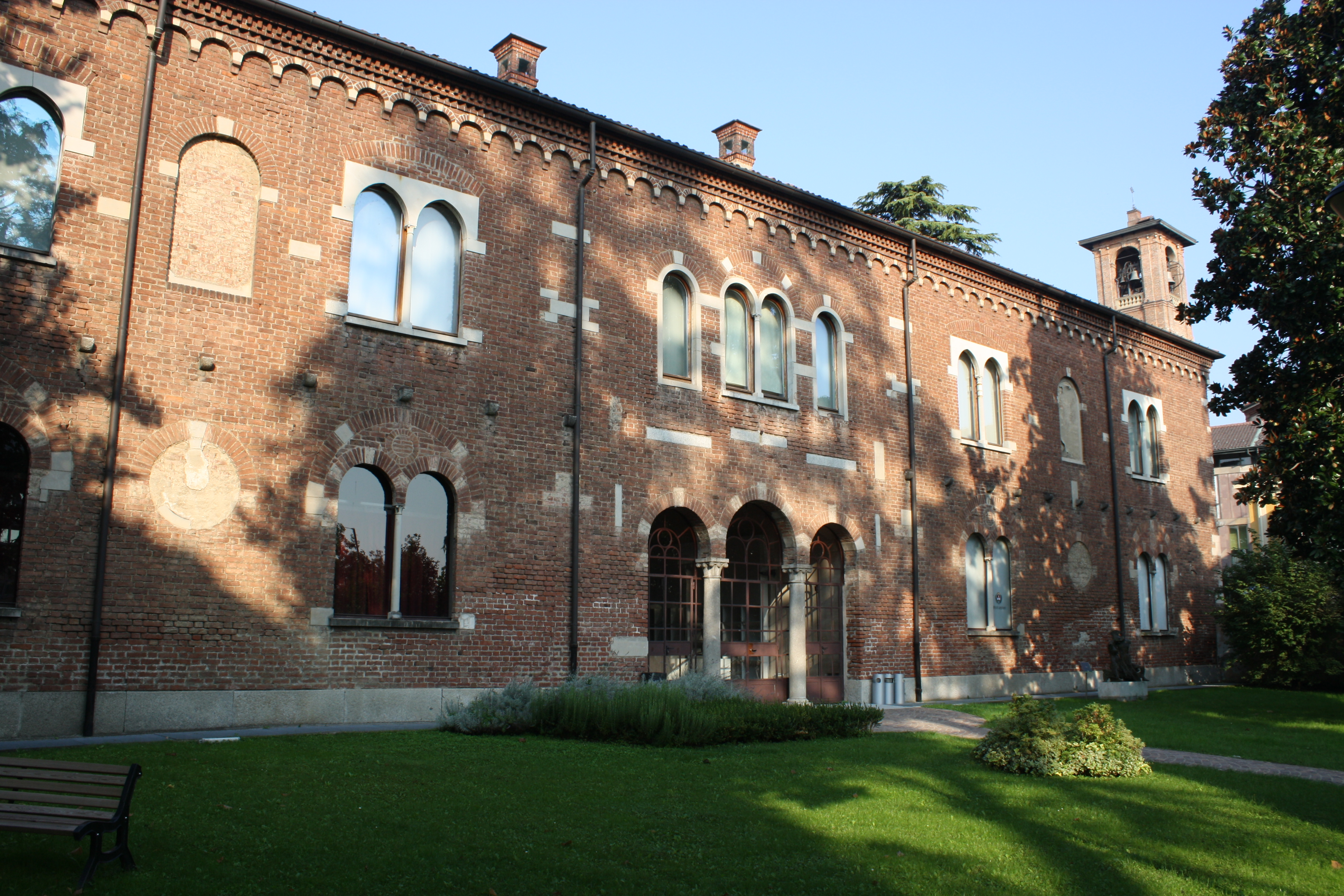
The 19th-century reconstruction of the medieval building of the same name

Leone da Perego, bishop of Milan from 1241 to 1257, stayed in Legnano. He lived in the palace of the same name, where he died on October 14, 1257. At first he was buried in the church of Sant'Ambrogio, then the body disappeared. As a consequence of the Battle of Legnano, the medieval Lombard communes became enfranchised from imperial power and their people gained the ability to elect consuls. I Previously, the government of the cities was held by the bishop, the nobles and the upper middle class. This led to the emergence in Milan of a situation of political instability, and thus Leone da Perego, who was among the leading proponents of the return of archiepiscopal supremacy over the city's government, was forced to leave the Milanese city on several occasions.

The archbishop often chose Legnano as his home because of the town's strategic function: Legnano was one of the closest fortified towns to Milan, and from it Leone da Perego could control political events in the Milanese capital. Leone da Perego's role was later taken over by Ottone Visconti, who became archbishop of Milan in 1262. The struggle was now no longer between the social classes of Milan, but between the Della Torre and Visconti families, who vied for supremacy over Milan. Legnano was one of the theaters of these clashes, which ultimately saw the victory of the Visconti. The Della Torre family, before being defeated and disappearing from the political scene, purchased a convent in Legnano that stood south of the town on an island in the Olona River (after causing the Augustinian friars who lived there to flee), and fortified it by converting it into a military structure. The fortified outpost then passed to the new rulers, from whom it took its name: thus was born the modern Visconti castle of Legnano. After its fortification, the Visconti castle acquired the role of defensive bulwark of the Milanese countryside, replacing the Cotta manor in that function. Legnano, retaining its strategic function until the 15th century, thus continued to be the scene of political events related to Milan even after the battle against Barbarossa. The Legnano community approved, in 1261, its first statutes, a deliberation that gave birth, formally, to the municipality of Legnano.

From 1270 Bonvesin de la Riva, the greatest Lombard poet and writer of the 13th century, lived in Legnano. Born in Milan, he lived at the convent of Santa Caterina in the Contrada Sant'Erasmo, where he wrote one of his best-known works, De quinquaginta curialitatibus ad mensam, a manual of good table manners. The first verse of that work reads:

[...] Bonvesin Dra Riva who is in Legnanọ [...]

— Bonvesin de la Riva

With this verse, Legnano makes its debut in Italian literature. Regarding Legnano, the poet wrote:

[...] Among all the cities of Lombardy, it is praised as the rose or the lily among flowers, as the cedar in Lebanon, as the lion among quadrupeds, as the eagle among birds, so as to look like the sun among celestial bodies, because of the fertility of the soil and the availability of the goods needed by the people [...]

— Bonvesin de la Riva

In Legnano Bonvesin de la Riva was a teacher and perhaps subsidized the construction of the hospice of Sant'Erasmo. He was a prolific writer, especially in the Milanese vernacular, of which eighteen works remain. Of his production in Latin, however, only three remain.

== 15th century ==
=== The noble families of Legnano and their palaces ===
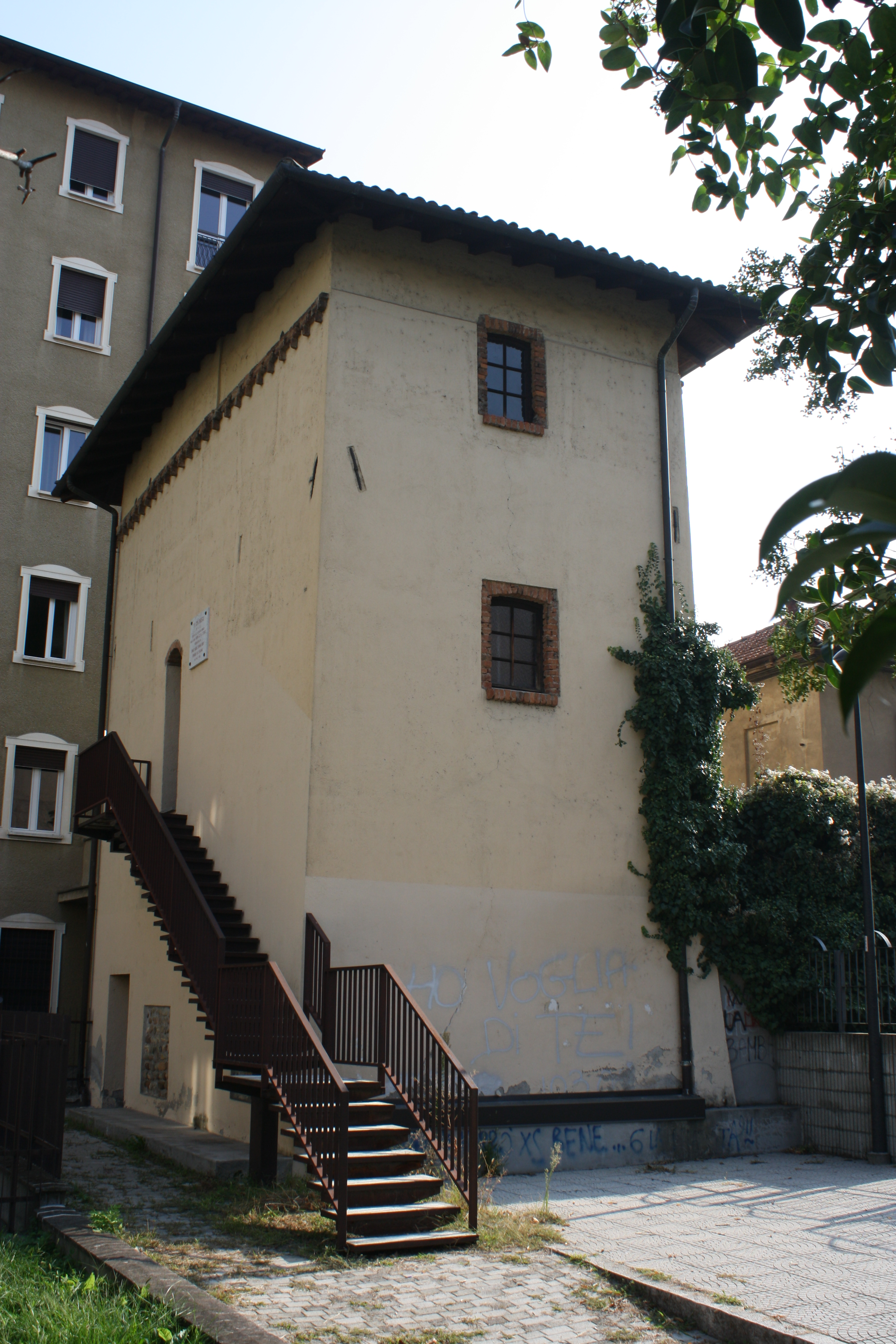
The 15th-century Colombera Tower

During the 15th century Legnano was dominated by several noble families. Despite the presence of these lineages, Legnano was never a true lordship to the point that the town of Legnano, unlike many neighboring communities, was never the subject of enfeoffment.

Among the most important noble families of Legnano in the 15th century, the Lampugnani family stands out; their head of the family, Oldrado II Lampugnani, was a nobleman of Milanese origin who became secretary and general of Filippo Maria Visconti's army. At the outbreak of the war between the Visconti and the Sforza for dominance over Milan, Oldrado II Lampugnani switched from supporting the former to supporting the latter, and his services to Francesco Sforza procured him important land holdings. In Legnano, in particular, he chose as his residence the castle already owned by the Della Torre family, which he strengthened by building new fortifications.

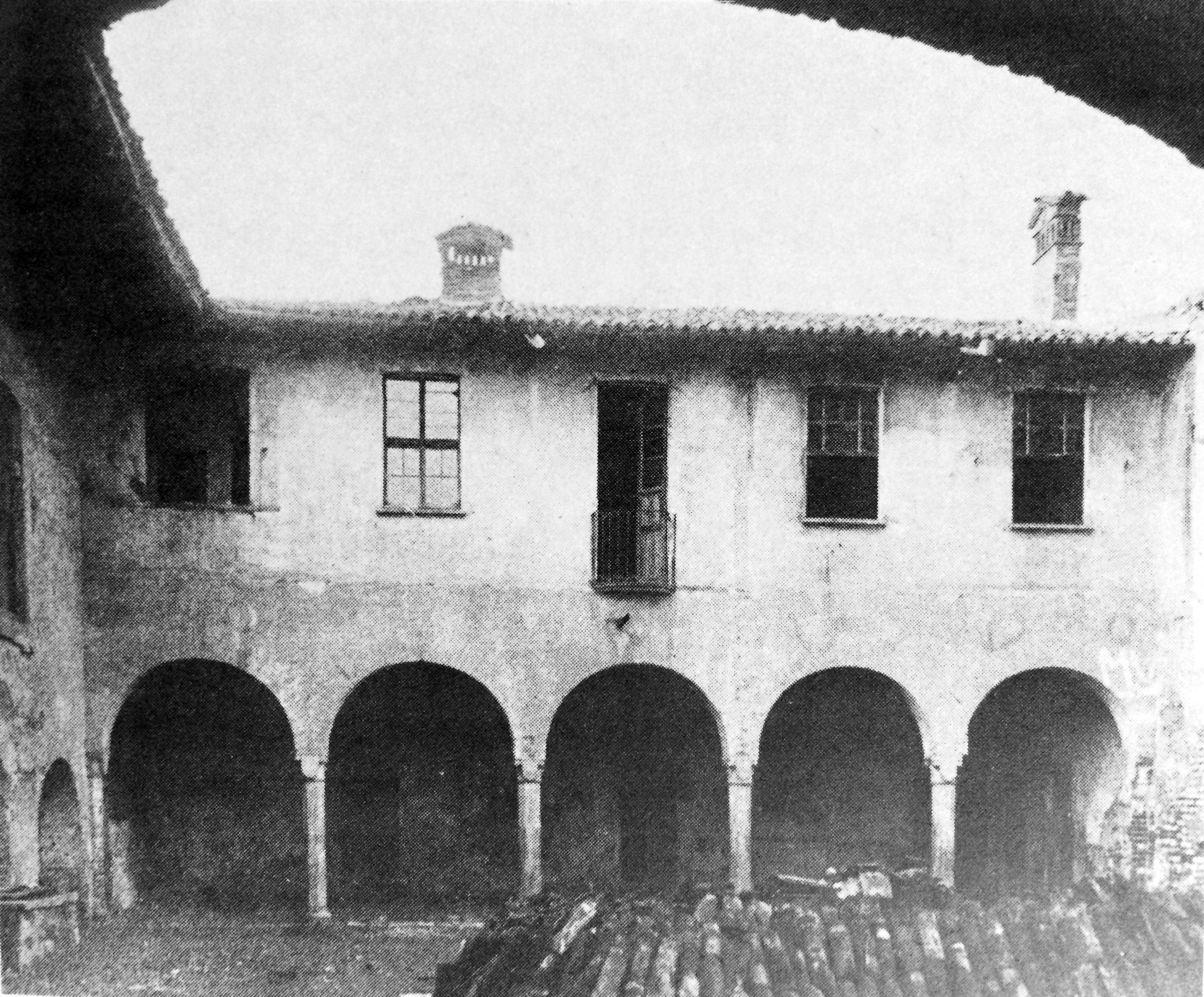
Inner courtyard of Lampugnani Manor

In this context, in 1448, Legnano was the scene of a phase of the clashes between the Visconti and the Sforza: part of Francesco Sforza's army camped in Legnano after conquering Abbiategrasso; with the support of Oldrado II Lampugnani, these troops then conquered Busto Arsizio.

Starting in the 15th century, in addition to the Lampugnani, Legnano began to be dominated by other noble families: the main ones were the Oldrendi (or Legnani), the Bossi, the Vismara, the Visconti, the Crivelli, the Maino and the Caimi. Among the latter, the most important in terms of possessions and wealth, besides the Lampugnani, was the Vismara lineage.

In the course of the century, in addition to the Visconti Castle and the Leone da Perego Palace, Legnano was enriched with many noble dwellings. In the 15th century, the Lampugnani manor house, the house of Gian Rodolfo Vismara, the Corio house and the Lampugnani painters' house were built; of these, the only one that has survived, although much remodeled, is the Corio house. The only civil structure that has survived intact until the 21st century from 15th-century Legnano is a small building in Corso Garibaldi, which was later incorporated into a courtyard. It is known as the Colombera Tower and is enriched by the remains of frescoes belonging to the mentioned noble houses that were saved before their demolitions.

=== Social aspects ===
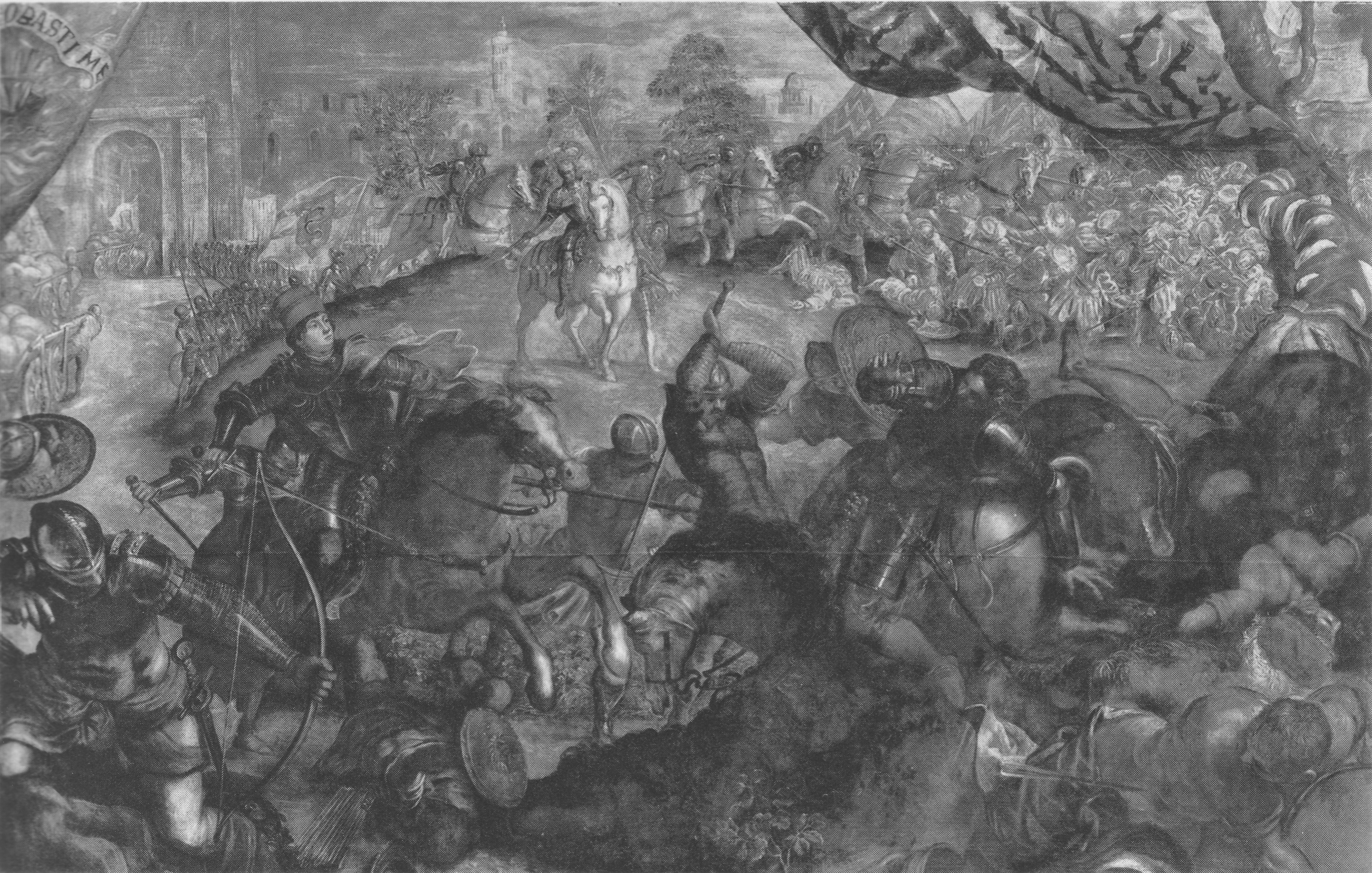
Federico I Gonzaga liberates Legnano from the siege of the Swiss (1478) on a painting by Tintoretto

Another distinguishing feature of 15th-century Legnano were the convents. There were four important ones in the town, two of them for males and two for females; the male ones were the convent of Sant'Angelo and the convent of the Humiliati, which had the ancient church of Santa Maria del Priorato attached, while the female ones were the convent of Santa Chiara and the convent of Santa Caterina.

On June 20, 1499, the people of Legnano asked the Duke of Milan that their market, which had been closed at an unspecified date, be reopened, but the request was not acted upon because the duke was at the time involved in a busy war against the French. It was probably the veto placed by the neighboring boroughs that convinced the duke to deny permission to reconstitute the market. Since the people of Legnano were forced to ask for government intervention, it is conceivable that the market that was held in Legnano in past centuries was not officially permitted, but was formed spontaneously without formal authorization.

== 16th century ==
=== Transformation into a simple agricultural center ===
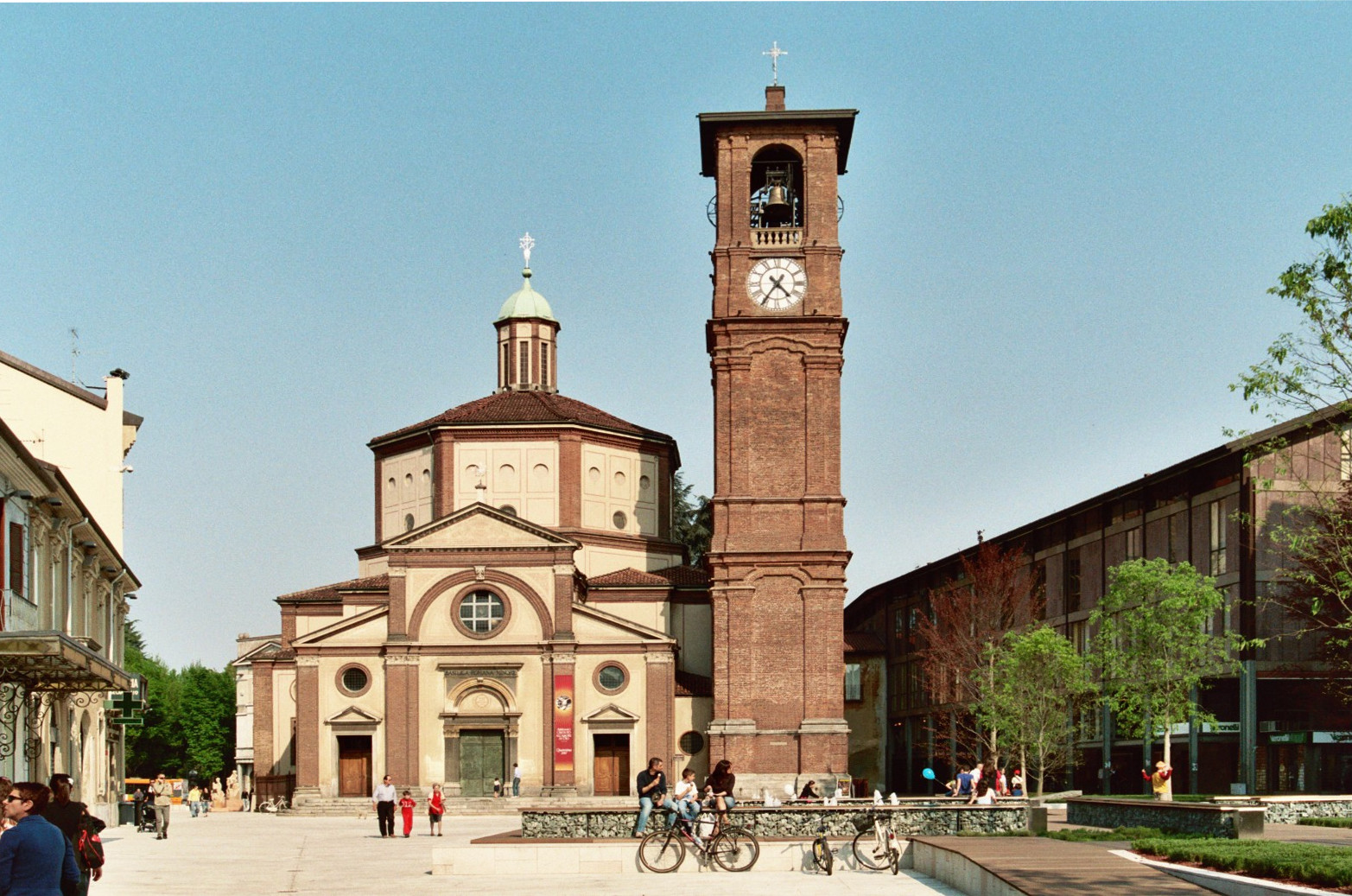
The 16th-century basilica of San Magno

The century began with a very important event in the history of Legnano: in 1504 construction of the basilica of San Magno began. Work on the erected basilica came to a halt in 1511, when Swiss soldiers sacked Legnano and set fire to the building site; earlier, in 1509, soldiers from Switzerland and at war with the Duchy of Milan had devastated Legnano and Busto Arsizio.

In the 16th century, in spite of the turmoil that led to the construction of the basilica, the village experienced a phase of decline, as it began to untie itself from Milan and gradually lost its strategic function; in this way, it turned from an important military outpost into a simple agricultural center. Already since the previous century, Seprio lost its rebellious attitude toward Milan, and thus the presence of fixed troops on the border of the Milanese countryside was no longer justified.

Thus, agriculture was the main activity on which Legnano's 16th century economy was based. Legnano's peasants mainly cultivated cereals (millet and wheat), vines and mulberry trees, which formed the basis of silkworm breeding. Gian Alberto Bossi, a poet, man of letters and humanist from Busto Arsizio, thus described Legnano in an inscription that is still placed on a stone above the side entrance door of the basilica of San Magno:

The pastures, the vineyards, the crops, the abundance of water, the temple, and the many noble families bring prestige to Legnano
Latin: Pabula, vina, ceres, rivorum copia templum Legnanum illustrant multaque nobilitas

— Gian Alberto Bossi

=== Administrative aspects ===
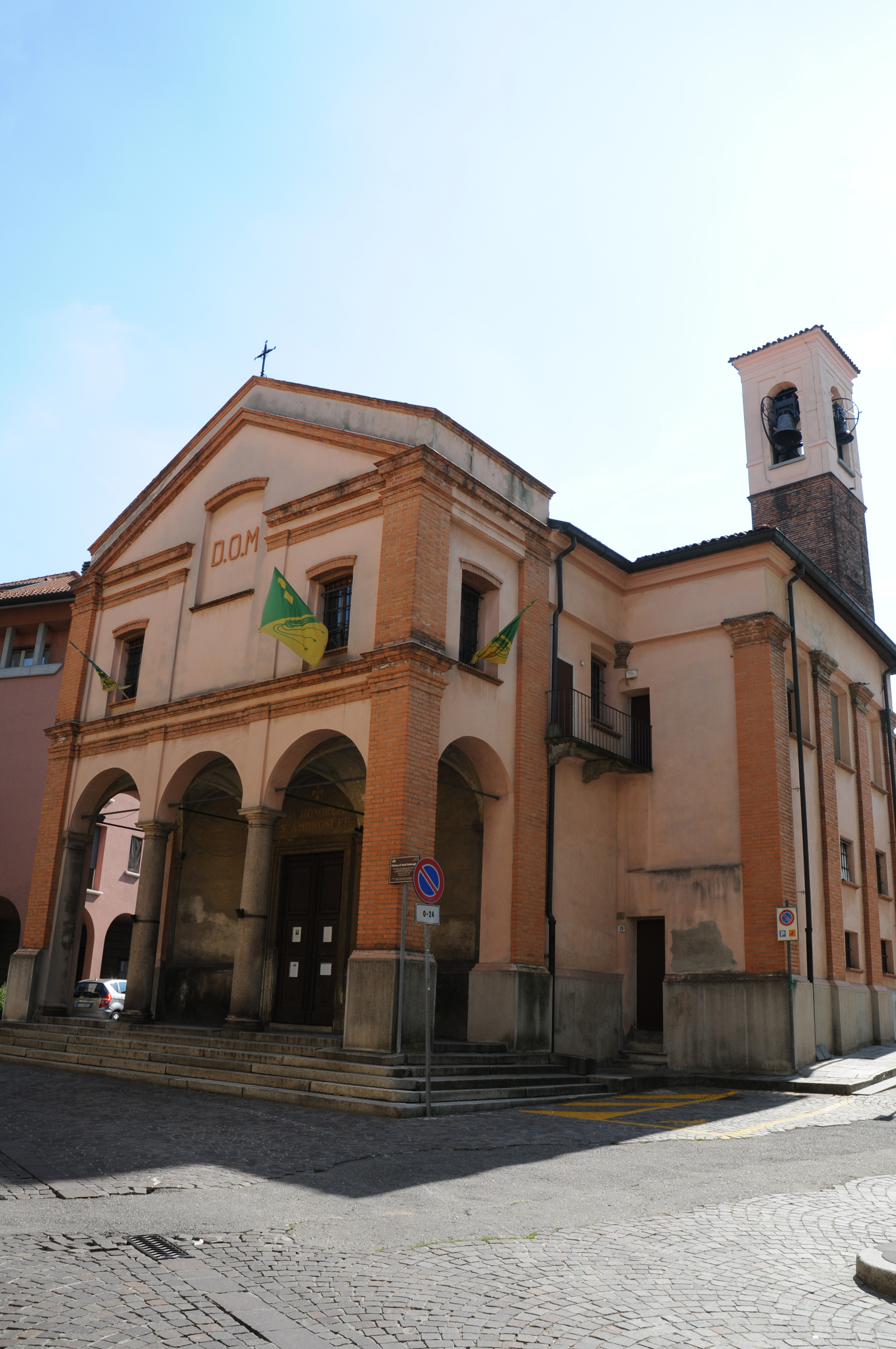
The church of St. Ambrose

In the 16th century, Legnano was divided into nine "comunetti," or administrative divisions whose function was to administer the various parts into which the territory of Legnano was divided. They were the "Vismara commune," the "commune of the Nuns," the "commune of Camillo Prata," the "Visconti commune," the "Morosinetto commune," and the "Comunetto." Each entity was governed by the wealthiest landowners, who corresponded to the noble families. They competed in the appointment of a mayor. The latter, who was the representative of the community, was assisted in the government of his municipality by two deputies and a cursor. Until the administrative reforms of Maria Theresa of Austria in Legnano there was frequent conflict between the landowners, who were of aristocratic origin, and the peasants who worked their property. In this context, at the beginning of the 16th century, Legnano reached a population of 1,500.

=== Social aspects ===
The religious momentum after the Counter-Reformation supported offerings for the construction and expansion of convents and churches. In addition to the Vismara family, other noble families competed to curry favor with the Milanese archbishops by linking their names to charitable works or works for the benefit of the community. In this context, on August 7, 1584 Charles Borromeo decided to move the provostry from Parabiago to Legnano. The foundation of the oldest public school in Legnano dates from this century, which was established at the church of Sant'Ambrogio in 1570 at the behest of Charles Borromeo.

In 1594 the population of Legnano, despite being decimated by famines and the plague epidemics of 1529, 1540 and 1576, grew to about 2,500 inhabitants, who were distributed in 221 houses. There were 470 households, while the average number of household members was five; on the other hand, the average age of the population was 27. Also in 1594, there were 16 water mills serving the millers of Legnano.

== 17th century ==
=== Social and administrative aspects ===
In the 17th century, the affairs of Legnano followed those of the Duchy of Milan, which came under Spanish rule. The administrative structure of the communes was confirmed even though, in order to limit the complaints of the peasants against the nobility, the Spanish government partially reformed this administrative system: eligibility rules for mayors were set, it was established that the administrators had to be accountable to the government for the work they did, and the resources that the peasants would have to provide to the Legnano administration were limited. The latter was accountable to the County of Seprio, which was governed by a captain or vicar who resided in Gallarate and supervised, among other things, justice and police, answering directly to the central administration in Milan.

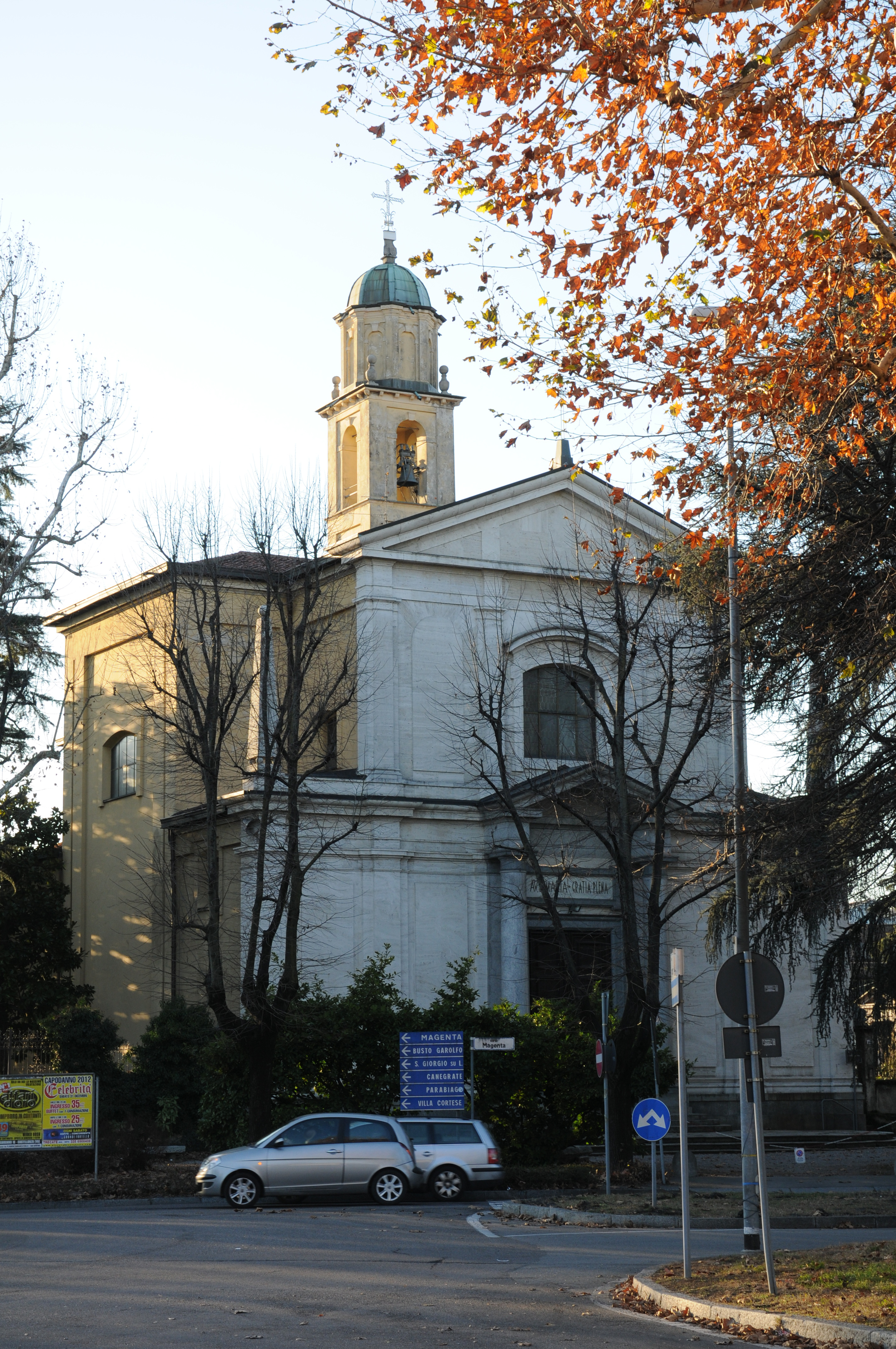
The 17th-century shrine of Our Lady of Grace

The population of Legnano, according to a 1620 census, amounted to 2,948 inhabitants, who were divided into 474 families. That statistical survey also surveyed productive businesses, land use and the size of the village (which amounted to 22,994 Milanese perches). Based also on other surveys taken in this century, the Legnano of the 16th century appeared as a community based on agriculture that relied on the fertility of the land and the presence of water mills; this wealth attracted passing armies, which often camped near Legnano plundering and damaging crops.

In 1627, the people of Legnano again requested, this time from the Spanish government, the opening of "a public market on each Thursday": the petition was opposed by Busto Arsizio, Gallarate and Saronno because they were concerned about possible competition, and so the request remained unfulfilled once again. In this context, from 1610 to 1650, the sanctuary of Madonna delle Grazie was built: this religious building was erected to celebrate a miracle that occurred to two deaf-mute boys.

Legnano was also ravaged by the plague epidemic of 1630; this pandemic, which was also recounted by Alessandro Manzoni in The Betrothed, mowed down the population of Legnano perhaps decimating, according to some interpretations of sources of the time, up to 90% of the inhabitants.

=== Attempted enfeoffment and loss of strategic role ===
Legnano, as already mentioned, was never enfeoffed and was never ruled by a podestà. On September 17, 1649, the people of Legnano, as a result of natural disasters that compromised the local economy and because of the Spanish government's plan to enfeoff the lands of the Duchy of Milan, were forced to pay a large sum of money to keep their properties. Thanks to the payment of 6,680 liras, Legnano remained under the direct sovereignty of the Duke of Milan without intermediaries.

In the seventeenth century, the gradual loss of strategic importance of Legnano continued, loosening contacts with Milan more and more. This downgrading put an end to the golden age of Legnano's aristocratic palaces built in the 15th century: these noble villas repeatedly changed ownership, eventually becoming simple residences of peasants, who did not care to preserve the valuable environments thus causing the decay of the buildings. During the Spanish rule over the Duchy of Milan, Legnano was chosen as a residence by many Iberian nobles. Legnanello, in particular, became a real aristocratic neighborhood inhabited by Spanish aristocrats.

== 18th century ==
=== Administrative aspects ===
In 1714, the Austrians succeeded the Spanish as rulers of the Duchy of Milan; among the first acts that were decreed was the reform of public administration. The primary local body of Austrian administration was the "community," which could be subdivided into several "communes." The communities were grouped into parishes which, in turn, formed a district, at the head of which was a chancellor, who was the representative of the Austrian government in the territory. When the village was of modest size there was only one municipality; if, on the other hand, the community was large, there was a subdivision into several municipalities. Legnano, in particular, was fractionated into nine communes: the "Dominant Commune," the "Trotti Commune," the "Lampugnani Commune," the "Large Morosino Commune," the "Morosinetto Commune," the "Visconti Commune," the "Commune of the Nuns," the "Vismara Commune," and the "Personal Commune." The further territorial division into communes was partly inherited from the administrative organization that was already in place at the time of Spanish rule. The community was governed by the estimati, i.e., citizens holding real estate, who were united in a "convocato," which appointed an "executive" of three members. The latter then appointed mayors (i.e., those who were in charge of the communes) and tax collectors. The community of Legnano was then legally accountable to the vicar of Seprio.

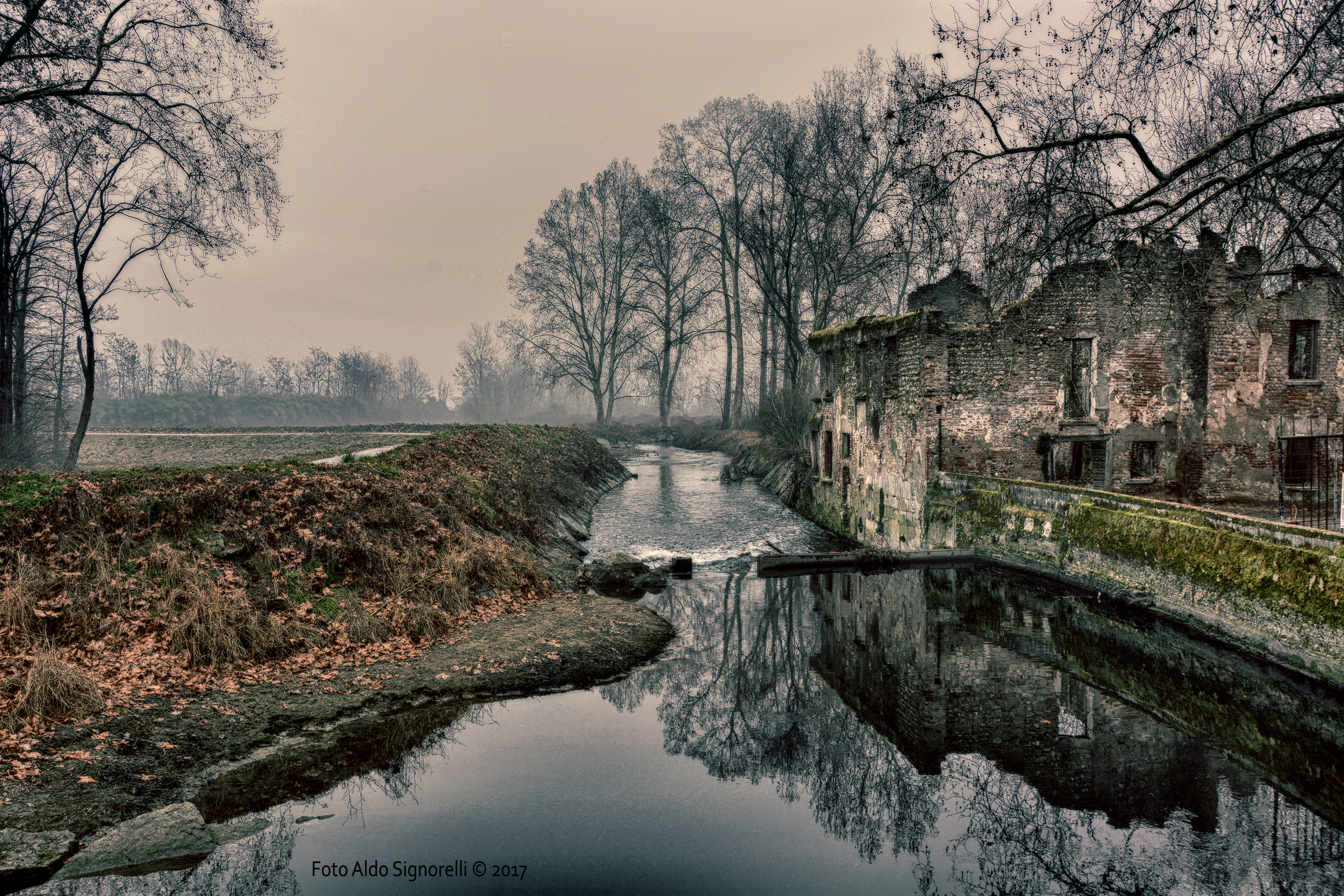
The remains of the Cornaggia mill, located in Legnano downstream from the Visconti castle

Under Austrian rule, a number of censuses were organized to collect data on the various boroughs that made up the empire: through them, the demographic and economic profiles of individual communities were determined. The result of this census was given the name Theresian Cadastre. As for Legnano, a total area of 26,422.13 perches was recorded in 1723. In this census, land uses were also determined with the precise measurement of areas. The statistical survey was then repeated in 1749; the latter showed the number of inhabitants to be 2,120. In 1760 the Austrian administration reformed the tax system; as a result of this update, landowners now paid taxes according to the yield of their land, which was calculated at the time the obols were paid and was therefore not constant as it could vary with time. From 1770 to 1784 the population of Legnano increased from 2,256 to 2,525.

=== Social aspects ===
The economy of eighteenth-century Legnano was purely agricultural with intensive farming. In 1772 there were 12 mills on the Olona River that used the motive power of the river to move the millstones. Some of them are depicted in Giuseppe Bossi's couplet in the basilica of San Magno. In later centuries they were gradually abandoned, and the last seven were demolished between the 19th and 20th centuries by the large textile industries of Legnano to be replaced by more modern plants that used the motive power of the river more efficiently. Crops were irrigated by the waters of the Olona thanks to water drawn and distributed by the branches and multiple irrigation ditches originating from the river.

In addition to grain cultivation, the economy of Legnano was also based on handicrafts and livestock raising. The people of Legnano, who lived in Lombard courtyard or railing houses, were part of groups that descended from several patriarchal families. They were subjected to metayage, or "colonia lombarda," under the supervision of the patriarch (in Legnanese ragiò, known in Milanese dialect by the term regiù), and worked cultivated land that stretched from the center of the village to the farmhouses on the outskirts. The elevations above the Olona River were cultivated with orchards and vineyards. The lands along the irrigation ditches originating from the river, the areas on either side of the lanes, and the land in the center of the farmhouses were used for the cultivation of mulberry trees, which were the basis of silk production.

The low incomes that were offered by the agricultural economy encouraged supplementing the activity of the fields with other tasks to which women took turns during the day. In the evenings, the Legnano farmers became spinners and weavers of silk, cotton, and wool, or dyers. The fabrics were dyed in copper cauldrons with the dye diluted in boiling water. After the fabrics had assimilated the dye, they were rinsed in the waters of the Olona, at which appropriate wooden structures were erected. These activities were the premise for the birth of industry.

After a provision of Emperor Joseph II issued in 1786 forbidding the use of mass graves, the Legnanese community was obliged to provide itself with a new cemetery located outside the town center to replace the "big pit" of medieval origin. This new cemetery had an initial area of 3,000 sq. m., later increased to 5,500 sq. m., and was located in the area now occupied by the Bonvesin della Riva schools, near the shrine of Madonna delle Grazie. Between 1808 and 1898 it housed the remains of 21,896 Legnanese.

Until the first half of the 18th century, education was practiced by private individuals, mainly religious, who practiced it on a small minority of the people of Legnano without depending on the municipal authority. It was, however, an education that provided only the rudiments of knowledge. Those who wanted to deepen their knowledge were obliged to go to centers larger than Legnano. The situation began to change in the second half of the 18th century with an imperial edict issued during Austrian rule and dated October 31, 1787, which mandated the opening of free schools in Lombardy. In Legnano, however, there was already, before this edict, a free school that had been established thanks to a testamentary bequest from Canon Paolo Gerolamo Monti dated September 15, 1749. It was established at the collegiate church of San Magno, but could accommodate only a few dozen Legnano schoolchildren.

Also from this period is the opening of the pellagrosario (a specialized hospital for pellagrins). It was inaugurated on May 29, 1784 inside the monastery of Santa Chiara to combat pellagra, a disease that had become common in the eighteenth century due to the increasing spread of corn among crops. On October 2, 1795, after the vain requests made in the previous centuries, the city market was reopened; according to the government provision, the market was to be held every Tuesday.

Legnano, too, was affected by the political and military upheavals following the French Revolution: after the annexation of Lombardy to the Cisalpine Republic, French soldiers, during one of their military campaigns, took silverware from Legnano's churches.

== 19th century ==
=== Napoleonic era ===
Even during the years of Napoleonic rule, Legnano maintained its role as an important agricultural town. Helped by the abundance of crops, since the Middle Ages the village also benefited from trade because of the roads that passed through it. However, it was Napoleon who built the Simplon road, which connected Milan to Paris by crossing the Alps (Simplon Pass). The Rho-Legnano-Gallarate-Arona section of this important communication route, which traced the ancient Roman and medieval road, greatly helped to increase the strategic importance of Legnano, the second post station from Milan: "Passàa a Legnàn e Castelànza se va drizz in Frànza" ("Passing from Legnano and Castellanza you go directly to France"), as a dialectal saying of the time goes. This important communication road, and the town's strategic position within the Milan-Como-Varese triangle, laid the foundation for the future industrialization of the village.

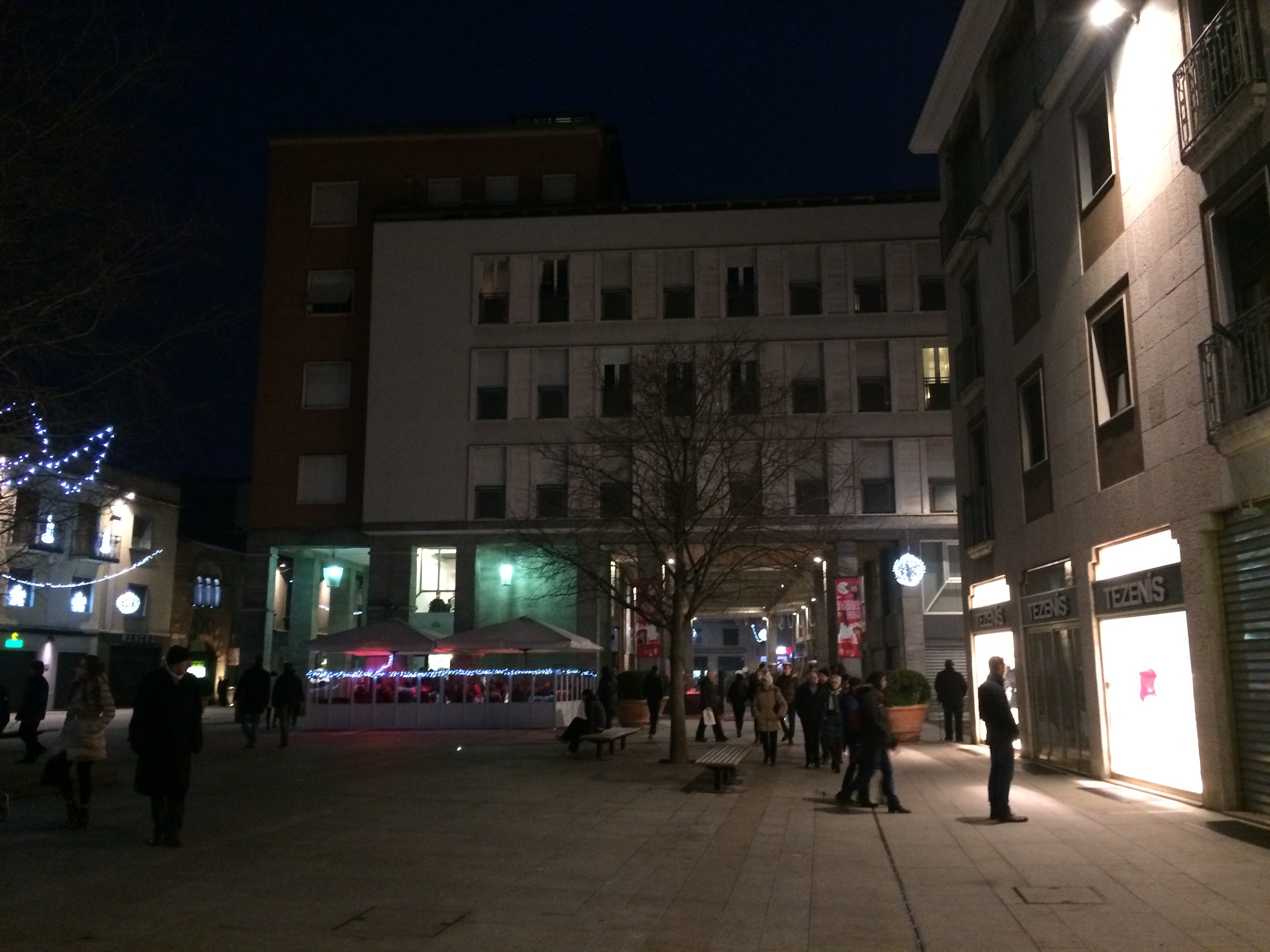
Piazza San Magno in a photo from the early part of the 19th century

In 1806 was the construction of the artificial canal Cavo Diotti, dug to irrigate crops that could not be reached by the Olona, and the establishment of the annual November fair; originally held on November 2 to commemorate the dead, it was later extended to the following days. The tradition of the autumn fair has not died out over the centuries: it is still organized in the 21st century in November on an area near the Visconti castle. At the beginning of the 19th century the nature of the area was still relatively wild: until the first half of that century wolves were present in the woods of Legnano.

As reported in a Napoleonic government document, in June 1805 the population of Legnano reached 2,784. The act was enclosed with a decree granting Legnano a modern administrative body in the form of a city council and a municipality: the former consisted of 15 members chosen by the prefect, while the latter consisted of a mayor and two "sages." At this time Legnano was the capital of the 4th canton, which was part of the Gallarate district, which in turn belonged to the department of Olona, which instead had its seat in Milan. The canton headed by Legnano encompassed a territory with a total population of 12,727 inhabitants, who were distributed among 17 municipalities.

At that time, the municipal administration of Legnano, which was ruled by the large landowners and wealthier bourgeoisie, was often forced to intervene to draft regulations on agriculture, pastures and land management, as well as to settle heated disputes between farmers and millers, especially during lean periods on the Olona River. The farmers, seeking protection, associated themselves with the Olona River Consortium, that is, the body that was founded in 1606 and already owned the rights to the irrigation ditches. In 1818, after paying 8,000 scudi to the Napoleonic government, the consortium obtained state rights over the Olona.

Napoleon passed through Legnano the day before his coronation as king of Italy. The event is documented by a circular letter from the prefect of the Olona department addressed to the municipal administrations: with it were set the requirements and procedures for the reception of the French ruler.

=== From the Conservative Order to the Unification of Italy ===
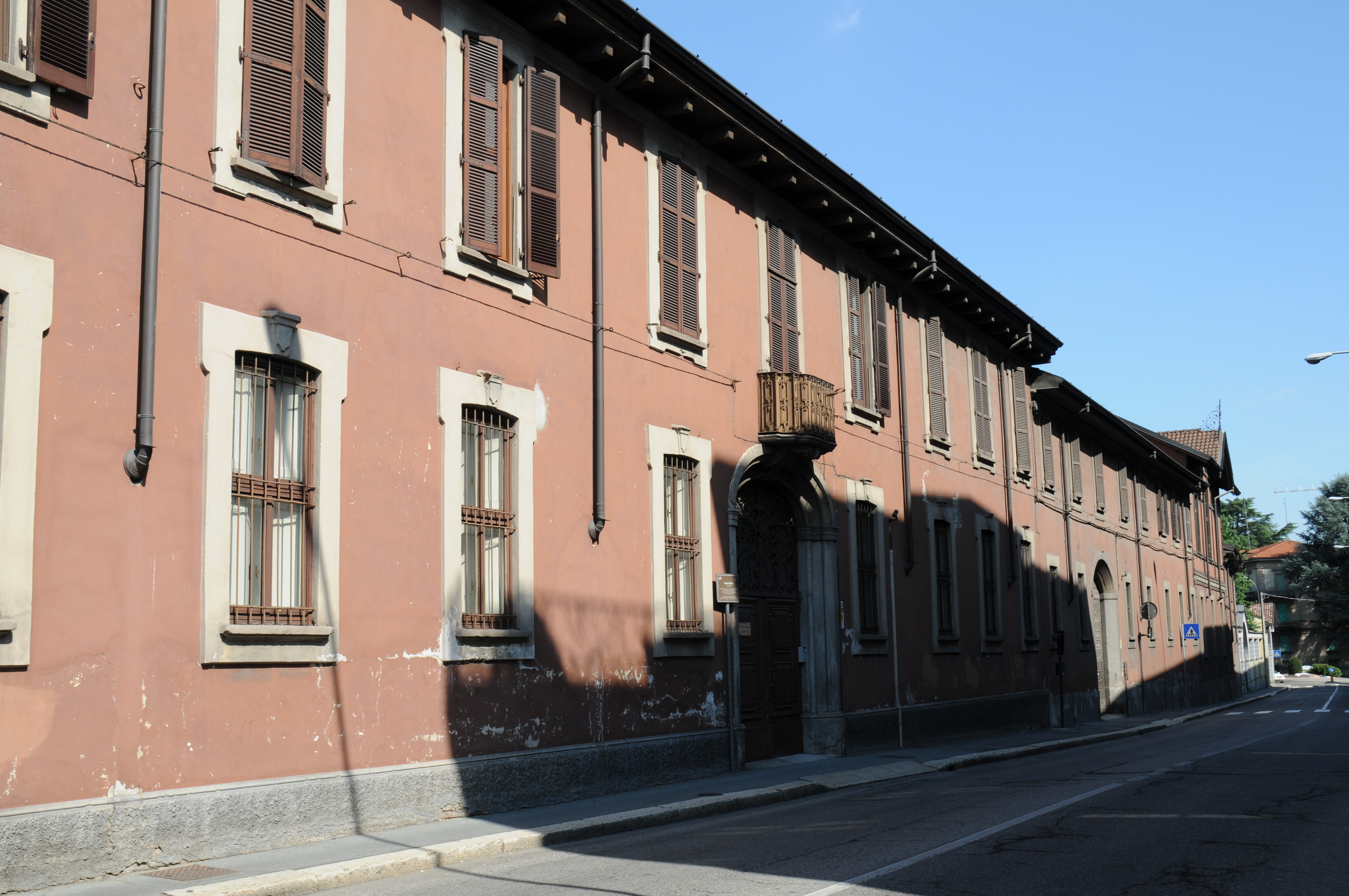
Palazzo Melzi

At the end of Napoleonic rule, with the Conservative Order, Lombardy was annexed to the Austrian Empire. Under Vienna's rule, local administrations were reorganized. On February 12, 1816, by imperial decree of Maria Theresa of Austria, the new territorial organization of Lombardy came into effect: Legnano ceased to be the capital and was joined to the 15th district of Busto Arsizio. In terms of services, the inauguration of the first post office dates from these years (1827).

The first intervention of the Legnanese municipal administration with regard to public education is from the beginning of the 19th century, when the city government entrusted two teachers with the management of two classes of schoolchildren, one for boys and one for girls. The establishment of premises for the exclusive use of the school, however, is from 1832; previously classes were held in makeshift rooms. A document from 1848 records how the number of students enrolled in this school, whose location was in modern Via Verdi, was 470 for the male class and 475 for the female class; in 1852 this school was moved to some premises in modern Corso Magenta. From these years is the foundation of the private institute by Barbara Melzi (1854), with the setting up of the kindergarten and elementary school; the building housing this institute, which belonged to the noble family of the same name, is of historical significance. A strong boost to public education came with the promulgation of the Casati Law (1859), following which the municipality of Legnano was obliged to set up a permanent municipal school; the administration solved the problem by renting a building from Marquis Cornaggia to be used as a school building. A few decades later, in 1896, the municipality of Legnano purchased the convent of Sant'Angelo, converting it into an elementary school; the old monastery was later demolished in 1967 and rebuilt (today's Mazzini schools).

Legnano, too, was traversed by the Risorgimento turmoil that involved Italy from the middle of the 19th century. During the First War of Independence a referendum for annexation to the Kingdom of Sardinia was also held in Legnano, and its result was an overwhelming victory in favor of annexation, although this was not followed up due to the subsequent defeat of Charles Albert of Savoy. Among the Legnanese who played a leading role in the Risorgimento were Saule Banfi and Ester Cuttica: the latter, in particular, also had direct relations with Giuseppe Mazzini.

In the wars of the Risorgimento that followed, at least eight Legnanese participated in battles framed in the Sardinian-Piedmontese army; Legnano also had one fallen in the Battle of San Fermo (Luigi Fazzini). A uniform of a Garibaldian was later discovered in an old house in Legnano, and is now among the objects preserved in the Sutermeister Civic Museum: the name of the soldier who wore it, however, is not known.

In this context, on December 20, 1860, the Legnano railway station was inaugurated, which served the recently built Milan-Gallarate line, and at that time still with a single track. The railway line was later doubled in the year 1900.

On March 17, 1861, with the proclamation of Victor Emmanuel II of Savoy as King of Italy, Legnano also became part of the modern Italian state. On June 16, 1862, from a balcony of a no longer existing building that was located along the modern Corso Garibaldi at the site of the headquarters of the Banca di Legnano, Giuseppe Garibaldi invited the people of Legnano to the construction of a monument in memory of the battle of May 29, 1176 with these words:

[...] We have little care for the memories of patriotic events; Legnano lacks a monument to note the valor of our ancestors and the memory of our related fathers, who succeeded in thrashing outsiders as soon as they were able. [...]

— Giuseppe Garibaldi

The people of Legnano followed Garibaldi's exhortation, and erected a first monument in 1876 on the 700th anniversary of the battle; this statue, which was made by Egidio Pozzi, was later replaced by the present one, which is instead the work of Enrico Butti. A plaque placed on the back of the Banca di Legnano building in Corso Garibaldi commemorates this event.

The first census taken by the newly formed Italian state (1861) recorded an increase in the population of Legnano of almost two thousand residents, from 4,536 in 1840 and 6,349 in 1861. This decade also saw the construction (1865) of the first public lighting system.

=== Second half of the century and industrialization ===
==== Proto-industrial phase ====
The industrialization of Legnano took place mainly between 1820 and 1880. What had a decisive weight in the genesis of this process was the tradition of handicrafts and domestic manufacturing that had been present in the productive fabric of Legnano for a few centuries; these activities were practiced to supplement work in the fields. The earliest factory of which there is documented evidence is a manufactory aimed at the production of wool dating back to the 12th century within one of the convents of the Humiliati located in the city.

In 1807, on a document sent by the municipality to the Napoleonic government it was reported that many artisanal spinning mills existed in Legnano, both of silk and cotton. Conversely, the first proto-industrial businesses in the modern sense of the term were two cotton spinning mills that were founded in 1821 by the Swiss Carlo Martin and in 1823 by his compatriots Enrico and Giovanni Schoc and Francesco Dapples. These very first businesses foreshadowed by a few years the founding of the Cantoni Cotton Mill, opened in Legnano by Camillo Borgomanero in 1828.

The process of industrialization that led to the gradual transformation of the economy of the Alto Milanese was accelerated by two natural disasters that threw local agriculture into crisis: cryptogamia, a disease that affected the grapevine, and nosemosis, an epidemic that damaged silkworm cocoons. For the first infection, which appeared between 1851 and 1852, the result in Lombardy was a rapid fall in the amount of wine produced: hectoliters of wine produced fell from 1,520,000 in 1838 to 550,000 in 1852. The final blow to wine production came from two other vine diseases that struck the plant between 1879 and 1890: downy mildew and phylloxera. Following these epidemics, wine cultivation in the Alto Milanese disappeared for good, and farmers concentrated their efforts on grain production and silkworm breeding. Before the disappearance of vines in Legnano, the wine of the Colli di Sant'Erasmo, which was produced in the district of the same name, was famous; the last fields of the Colli di Sant'Erasmo cultivated with vines were eliminated in 1987 to allow the construction, between Via Colli di Sant'Erasmo, Via Canazza and Via Trivulzio, of a parking lot to serve the civic hospital.

Shortly after the spread of vine disease, a silkworm infection, pébrine, appeared. In addition to this problem, in the second part of the 19th century, Europe was hit by an agricultural crisis involving cereal crops: this was due to the spread on the markets of competitively priced American grains. Vast areas of the U.S. Middle West had been earmarked for cultivation, while technological advancement brought about a marked decline in sea transport costs. The result was a profound crisis that affected grain crops in Europe; this conjuncture peaked in the 1880s and characterized Old World agriculture until the early 20th century. This event gave a further push toward the industrialization of the Alto Milanese, as it also put into crisis the most important sector of agriculture in the area after the disappearance of vineyards and the crisis of silkworm breeding: cereal cultivation.

==== Industrialization ====
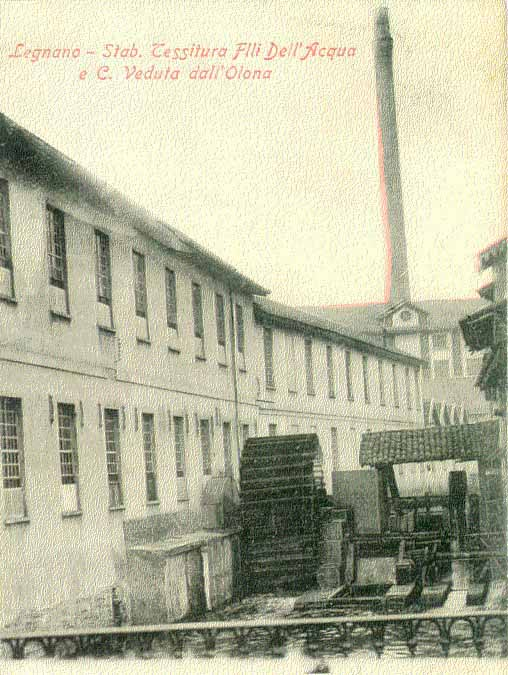
Dell'Acqua Cotton Mill

The first phase of industrialization in Legnano, which took place in the early part of the 19th century and was characterized by a pre-capitalist production system, was later followed by a modernization of production processes. This initiated, in the second half of the century, the second phase of the industrial revolution in Legnano, which led to the establishment of real textile and mechanical factories in the modern sense of the term. The first capitalist businesses that gradually formed were spinning mills, which originated from the proto-industrial activities that had sprung up in the first decades of the 19th century; some of them grew considerably until they were counted among the main cotton mills in Lombardy. In 1878 the first Italian customs tariff led to a certain protectionism, especially with regard to yarns and textiles in common use: this put the Italian cotton industry in a better position to withstand competition from the English industry. This led to the great expansion achieved by the Italian textile industry, which peaked from 1890 to 1906. Among the industries in Legnano, the leading one, in terms of organization and technology, was Cotonificio Cantoni; this supremacy is mentioned on an 1876 document describing the industrial situation of the time in the Legnano area.

The machines used in the textile industry, which were increasingly efficient and therefore complex, meant that there was a need for maintenance equipment. In addition there was a need for quick repairs. Consequently, in the last decades of the 19th century, the first mechanical industries in Legnano were born, which built and repaired textile machinery; later, more extensive production was added to the mechanical field. In 1876 Eugenio Cantoni hired engineer Franco Tosi, who had just returned from an apprenticeship in Germany, as director of his company. Franco Tosi then founded the mechanical industry of the same name in 1882; the first steam engine to come out of the factories of the newly formed company was destined for the Cantoni Cotton Mill in Castellanza. Among the largest companies operating in Legnano between the 19th and 20th centuries were also the Bernocchi, Dell'Acqua and De Angeli-Frua cotton mills; the last large textile factory to be planted in Legnano was the Manifattura di Legnano, which arose in 1903. Many other small textile and mechanical factories were then born in the Legnano area. One of the aspects of industrial development in the Legnano area was also the emergence, especially in the fields of foundry and mechanics, of small industries implanted by former employees of large companies who had themselves become entrepreneurs. In 1908 Andrea Pensotti, former foreman of Franco Tosi, established first a foundry and then a machine shop, both located near the railroad. Andrea Pensotti, which within a few decades became Legnano's fourth largest manufacturing site, concentrated on the manufacture of boilers that were also exported abroad.

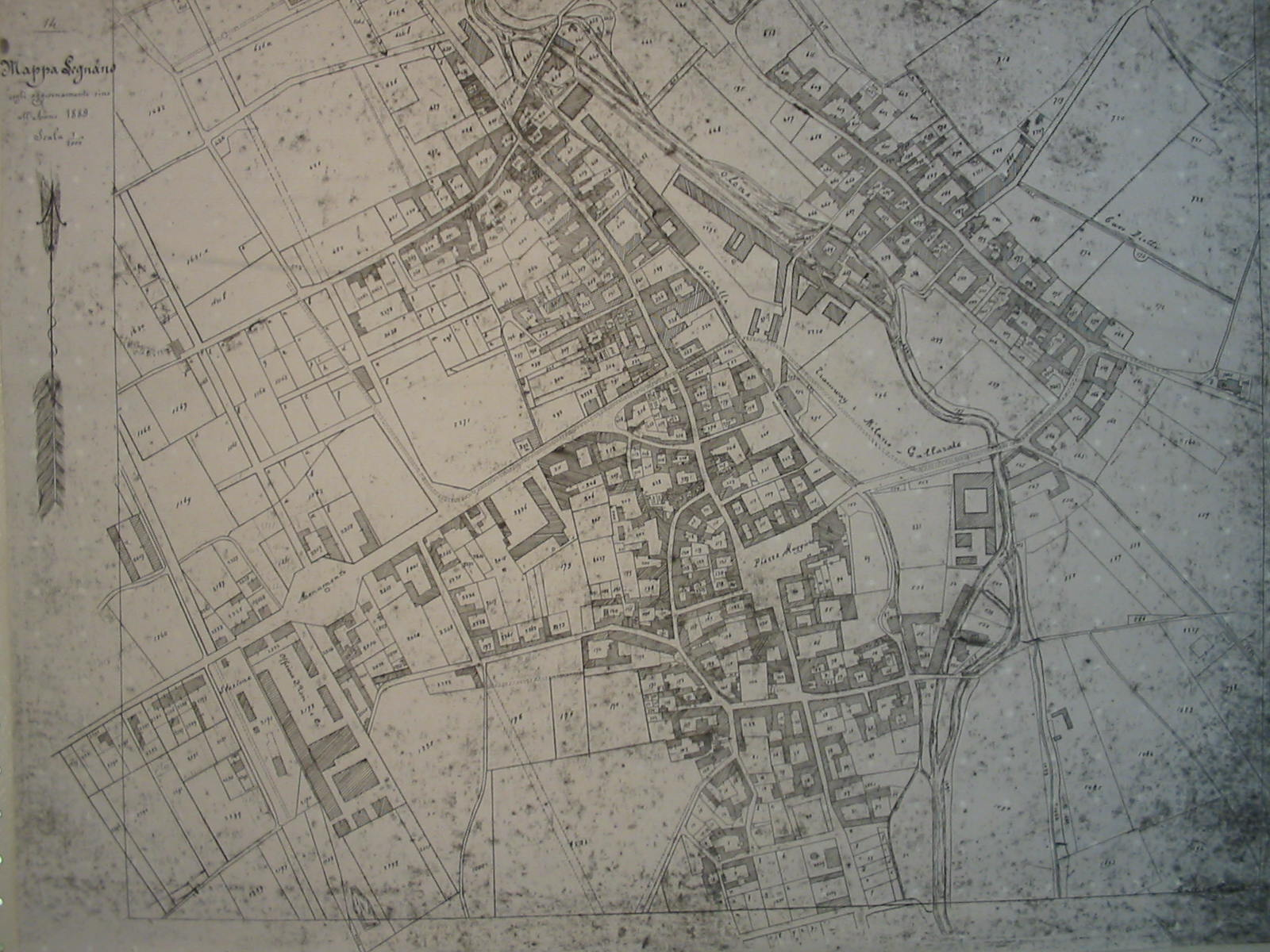
A map of Legnano from 1889

From this period is the opening of the first bank branches and the birth of the Legnano credit institutions. In July 1875 the Legnano branch of the Cassa di Risparmio delle Provincie Lombarde was opened, while on June 11, 1887 the Banca di Legnano was founded, which opened its first branch on January 16, 1888. On the other hand, Credito Legnanese was born in 1923, which was absorbed in 1975 by Banco Lariano.

==== Social aspects ====
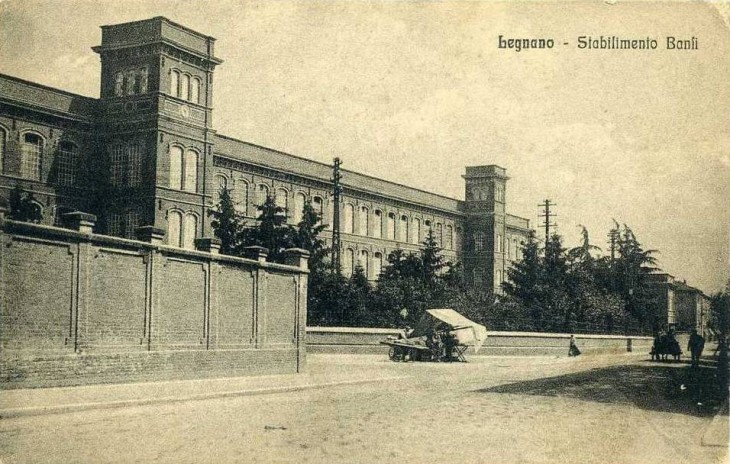
The De Angeli-Frua factory in Legnano

Between 1885 and 1915 there was the complete industrial transformation of the former agricultural village, which was accompanied by a strong population increase. The population of Legnano increased from 7,041 in 1885 to 28,757 in 1915. As the number of inhabitants grew exponentially, it was decided to build (1906) the municipal aqueduct.

Industrial development led to a new agricultural crisis in the area: many farmers began to work in factories, abandoning agriculture. The ratio of people employed in industry, compared to total workers, rose from 12% in 1857, to 28% in 1887 to 42% in 1911: at the end of the process of transformation of the agricultural village into a modern industrial city, Legnano began to be nicknamed the "little Manchester" of Italy, a title disputed in the area with the neighboring and equally industrialized Busto Arsizio. The pace and scope of this transformation had few other comparable examples on the European continent.

Employees during these years in the Legnano companies had a 12-hour work schedule, with a one-hour lunch break. During the industrialization of Legnano there was extensive use of child labor; in 1886 a law was enacted to protect minors, but the change was gradual, as there was resistance from industrialists. Still in 1897, children under 15 years of age employed in Legnano companies corresponded to 21.6 percent of the total for textile industries and 8.75 percent for mechanical companies. In the 19th century this was a common phenomenon in many European countries, particularly England. In this context, in the early 1880s, the first strikes were organized in the Legnano factories, which did not always have positive effects for the workers, and the first workers' societies were born. The peak of labor unrest was reached during World War I due to the restrictions of the conflict, which undermined the already fragile social balance.

At the turn of the century there was also a strong commercial development. Infrastructure for transporting people and goods was very important for this expansion. In 1880, the Milan-Gallarate tramway was also built along Corso Sempione, which connected Legnano with the Lombard capital and was suppressed in the second half of the 20th century. In 1882 there was a disastrous flooding of the Olona River: for the courageous and philanthropic actions of its inhabitants, as can be read in the reasons for the distinction, Legnano was awarded the gold medal for civil valor. Until 1898, the only parish present in Legnano was that of St. Magnus: later the parishes of the Holy Redeemer (1898), St. Dominic (1907) and Holy Martyrs (1911), St. Theresa of the Child Jesus (1964), St. Paul (1970) and St. Peter (1973) were established.

Due to the increase in population at the end of the 19th century, Legnano's municipal administration decided to build a new cemetery, as the one inaugurated in 1808 could no longer be enlarged because of the roads and houses rising around it. The monumental cemetery of Legnano, which was inaugurated on July 24, 1898, initially had an area of 18,942 sq. m.; it was later expanded in 1907 to an area of 50,000 sq. m.

== 20th and 21st centuries ==
=== From the beginning of the 20th century to World War I ===
In 1903 Legnano's first covered public baths were inaugurated, which also included a gymnasium for gymnastics; when their function ended, the gymnasium became home to the municipal band corps, while the public baths later began to house the local headquarters of the Italian Red Cross. Both buildings are eclectic in style. Also in 1903, the first pavilion of the Civil Hospital was built with the contribution of the industrialists of Legnano, while on November 28, 1909, Malinverni Palace was inaugurated as the town hall. In 1915, on the eve of Italy's entry into World War I, Legnano reached 28,757 inhabitants: from the beginning of the 20th century the city underwent a strong demographic increase that was due to immigration and was brought about by the great development of industry.

These years were also marked by the extension of public education, with the founding of new school buildings: elementary schools, middle schools and high schools were built. As early as 1897 there were 1,648 pupils in Legnano schools, both public and private, a remarkable number for the time.

In the first part of the 20th century, technical and vocational institutes were founded, which catered to the future workers of local companies, made possible by the contribution of Legnano entrepreneurs; in this era there was a strong need to train, from a professional point of view, the future workers of industries, namely skilled workers and technical and commercial employees. Thus the "Carlo Dell'Acqua" Technical Commercial Institute (1917-1918) and the "Antonio Bernocchi" Vocational Institute (1917) were founded. The latter was then joined in 1959 by the Industrial Technical Institute, also named after Bernocchi; on the other hand, in 1943 the scientific high school was inaugurated, followed in 1960 by the classical high school with gymnasium.

In 1915, Italy declared war on the Central Empires, thus entering the First World War. The consequences of the entry into the war were also reflected in Legnano: many soldiers from Legnano left for the front and perished on the battlefields. The suffering and renunciations for the civilian population became more acute as the months and years passed. During World War I, the city's large industrial complexes were in trouble due to the shortage of raw materials; the latter, before the conflict, came from Germany and Great Britain, that is, two nations involved in the conflict. During the war, industries in Legnano converted their plants to produce war supplies; Franco Tosi, in particular, helped equip the Army's artillery units.

Two natural disasters further worsened the situation caused by the war: a devastating flood of the Olona River, which broke its banks and invaded the town (1917), and the Spanish flu epidemic, which mowed down the population starting in early 1918.

=== Between the two world wars ===
==== The first postwar period and fascism ====
At the end of World War I, in 1918, Legnano was also involved in deep social tensions, which were a consequence of the conflict and resulted, at the national level, first in the Two Red Years and then in Fascism. In these years the municipal administration extended the aqueduct and gas networks. Also from this period is the strong urban expansion and the radical transformation of the city center, which involved, among other things, the demolition of some important historical buildings: the hospice of Sant'Erasmo (which was later rebuilt) and two ancient bridges over the Olona River were also demolished.

On the economic front, in the following years, industry in Legnano resumed the sustained growth that had characterized it until the outbreak of the conflict. This rapid development had been slowed, but not stopped, by the war. In the postwar years a number of workers' houses were built by the owners of the large industrial complexes in Legnano, work that continued even after World War II ended. From the manufacturing point of view, the interwar period was characterized by the birth and growth of medium-small companies, mostly textile and mechanical, which flanked the large industries already present for decades in the economic fabric of Legnano. In this context, in 1936, Giovanni Crespi was founded, a company in the chemical branch specializing in the production of synthetic materials for footwear and leather goods.

Beginning in 1920, the first fascist groups were also formed in Legnano. In this context occurred (1921) Benito Mussolini's first official visit to the city; at that time he went as a member of the National Fascist Party, since he was not yet president of the Council of Ministers. However, the first contact between the future Duce and Legnano had been earlier: in 1901 Mussolini had applied to the mayor for a position as a substitute elementary school teacher, an application, however, that was not granted. After the 1921 visit, on October 5, 1924 Mussolini returned to Legnano as head of government to deliver the decree conferring the title of city and to inaugurate the "Antonio Bernocchi" schools; on the occasion, he also visited the cotton mill of the same name. Benito Mussolini visited Legnano again on October 4, 1934: he spoke in Piazza San Magno from a stage placed on top of a Franco Tosi turbine in front of a few thousand people. On this occasion he also visited the Dell'Acqua cotton mill.

In 1920 the "Federazione industriali legnanesi" was formed, which had its heyday in 1924 (previously the city's entrepreneurs were headed by the "Federazione industriali Altomilanese"). The association was later abolished by a law on April 3, 1926: this regulation eliminated local federations, making them merge into provincial unions.

==== The 20-year Fascist period ====
On August 15, 1924, Legnano was granted the elevation of municipality to "city" status; the title was awarded by royal decree by King Victor Emmanuel III. According to a 1927 census, the population of Legnano was about 30,000, with 677 industrial or handicraft businesses; on the other hand, the labor force consisted of 9,926 workers in textile factories, 4,056 workers in mechanical factories, 1,762 workers in commerce, credit, insurance and other services, and 287 employees in transportation and communications. In this context, the Legnano bicycle brand was born; the most popular means of transportation at that time was the bicycle. 1927 was also the year of the administrative reform sought by the Fascist regime: the office of mayor was abolished with the establishment of the figure of the podestà, who was a government appointee, and the town council and council were eliminated. The podestà was supported by a municipal council, appointed by the prefect.

During the two decades of Fascism, many public works were built and completed, including the completion of the hospital and the reconstructions of the Sant'Erasmo hospice and Palazzo Lampugnani. Buildings of the institutions of the Fascist Party were also constructed, such as the Casa del Balilla in Via Milano and the Casa del Littorio (today Palazzo Italia in largo Tosi, the headquarters of the State Police headquarters). The monumental cemetery was enlarged and Corso Sempione was widened. On June 19, 1923, the sanatorium named after Queen Elena was inaugurated on Via Colli di Sant'Erasmo to combat tuberculosis; the structure, which is in Art Nouveau style and was not demolished when the sanitary emergency ended, later became the site of a socio-educational center for the disabled and welfare institutions. In May 1935, the first Palio di Legnano was organized to commemorate the victory of the Communes of the Lombard League against Frederick Barbarossa in the battle of May 29, 1176.

On December 16, 1937 Benito Mussolini awarded a representation of industrialists and workers from Legnano invited to Palazzo Venezia in Rome about three million lire for the erection of a heliotherapy colony and the construction of a swimming pool; these funds were donated by local businessmen and workers and then solemnly handed over by the Duce. The building that once housed the heliotherapy colony still exists today and is the site of the psycho-social center, that is, a health facility under the psychiatric department of the Legnano hospital.

On July 23, 1937, by royal decree signed by Victor Emmanuel II, Legnano was granted the use of a civic banner. At that time the city had the weekly newspaper La voce di Legnano as its newspaper. This press organ is associated with one of the episodes of violence that the fascists perpetrated in Legnano. The newspaper had not sided with the will of the Fascist leaders, and so its office was ravaged. The Varese daily Cronaca Prealpina had, even at that time, a page devoted to events in the Legnano area, as did the periodical "Luce," a Catholic newspaper.

=== World War II and the Resistance ===
==== From the first part of the war to the armistice of September 8 ====
In 1940 Italy entered World War II, and the events of the war consequently affected Legnano as well. Many Legnano soldiers died on the war field, and the effects of hardship on civilians became more acute as the months and years passed. Industries in Legnano were converted for military orders; for example, a department had been set up in the Cantoni factories to produce clothing for the armed forces. However, a small velvet cutting sector was kept active in this factory, almost clandestinely, in order to retain skilled workers and resume civilian production when the war was over.

On the night of August 13–14, 1943, over 500 British bombers flew over Lombardy bound for Milan; some of them, by mistake, ended up over Legnano where they dropped bombs. In Legnanello this bombing caused 27 deaths, almost all of whom perished on the road as they fled to the woods. Some ordnance also fell on the Cantoni Cotton Mill (two bombs were found in 2008).

The decisive turning point of the war was the September 8, 1943 armistice between Italy and the Allies. As early as the next day German armored cars began patrolling Legnano. Legnano industries, now controlled by the Nazis, began to supply the Third Reich with the manufactured goods needed to continue the war. From the fall of 1943, the Legnano companies went into crisis due to shortages of raw materials and fuels; however, the danger of dismantling the plants and moving them to Germany was averted.

==== From Resistance to Liberation ====
In October 1943, the first armed groups made up of soldiers fleeing after September 8, workers and students, who became part of the Resistance, were organized in Legnano and neighboring towns. At the same time, in the Legnanese companies, boycotts against the Germans began in order to prevent industrial goods from being used by the Nazis to continue the war. Later, the partisan brigades "Carroccio" (linked to Catholic circles), "Garibaldi" (close to social-communist instances) and other autonomous formations, including "Sicilia," were formed in Legnano, which operated together with the partisan brigades of Northern Italy following the directives of the National Liberation Committee.

It was in this context that one of the most dramatic events of the Legnano Resistance took place. On January 5, 1944, the SS carried out a reprisal action in the Franco Tosi factory because of a strike called by the company's workers. Six workers with anti-fascist leanings who were part of the factory council were picked up; upon the rebellion of the other workers, 63 workers were arrested. After lengthy interrogations, the Germans released the workers, except for seven of them, who were deported to Nazi concentration camps. Similar reprisals were carried out in other companies such as Metalmeccanica, Manifattura di Legnano and Società Industrie Elettriche. A total of 11 Legnano workers died in Nazi concentration camps during the war.

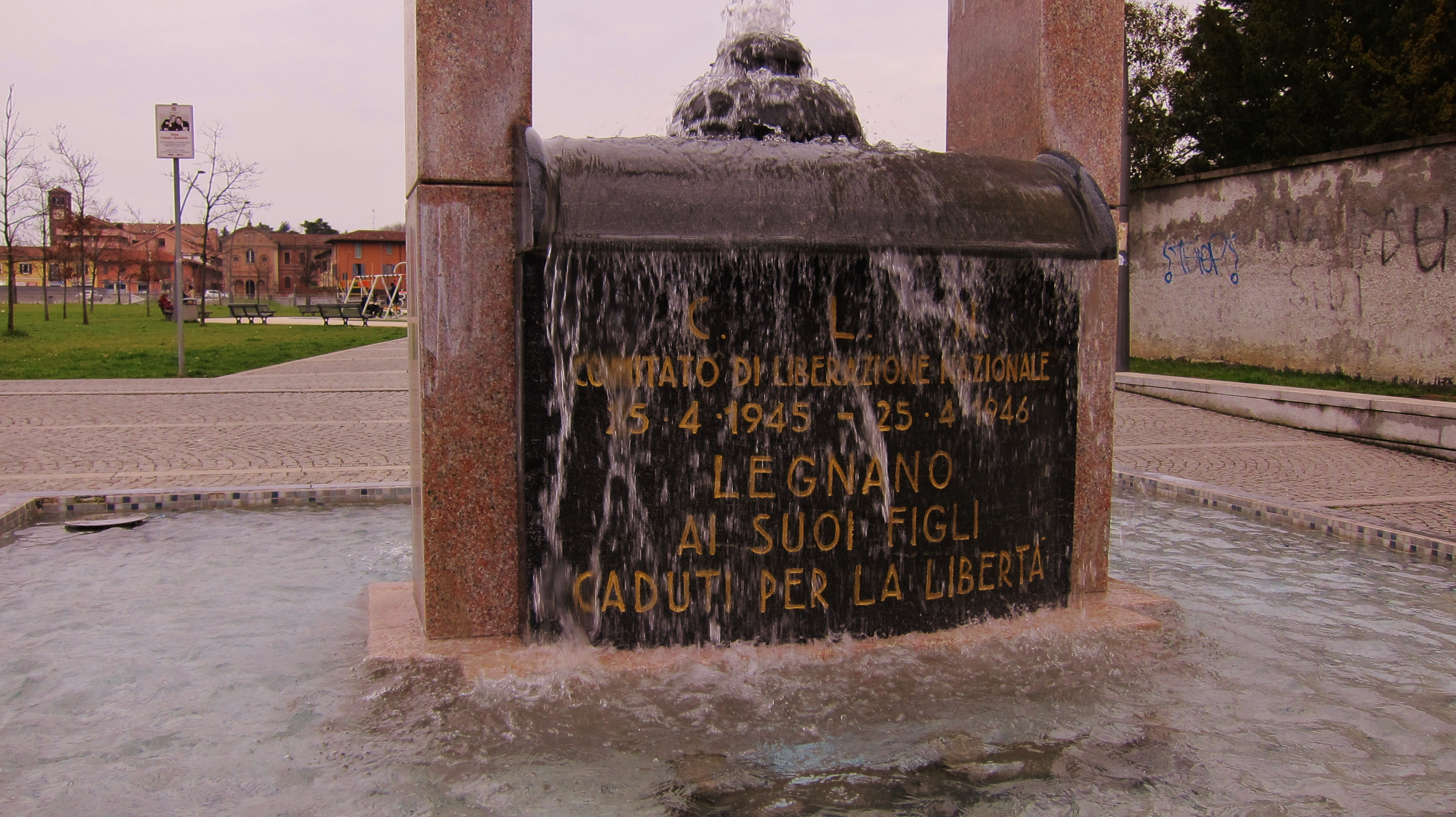
Detail of the National Liberation Committee fountain placed in memory of the people of Legnano who fought and died for the liberation of Italy from Nazi-fascism. The dedication reads, "Legnano, to its sons who fell for freedom." This monument is located in Largo Franco Tosi in Legnano.

In the winter of 1944, however, the attack on the Mantegazza hotel-restaurant took place. In the restaurant of the public establishment, on the evening of November 4, 1944, fascist and Nazi soldiers were gathered for a dinner. Some partisans who were part of the "Garibaldi" brigade detonated, on one of the windows, a device that left five dead and twenty-five wounded: the attack caused a reaction from the fascists, who carried out several arrests and beatings. In October of the same year, one of the instructors of the "Garibaldi" brigades, Mauro Venegoni, was captured by the fascists: the squadrists ordered him to confess the names of the partisans of his brigade, but upon his refusal they tortured, blinded and killed him in Cassano Magnago. For this tragic episode, when the conflict was over, Venegoni was awarded the gold medal of military valor in memory and a street in the town was dedicated to him.

After April 27, 1945, the day Legnano was liberated from the Nazi-Fascists, there were episodes of revenge against the exponents of the newly collapsed regime: in total, sixteen Legnanese were shot. Some of them belonged to the former republican militia, while others had been involved in fascist actions. The killings were carried out in Piazza San Magno, in Piazza del Mercato, at the Mazzafame farmstead and at the Milan-Laghi highway junction in Castellanza. The body of Benito Mussolini, who was executed on April 28, 1945, passed through the outskirts of Legnano on its way to a convent of Capuchin friars in neighboring Cerro Maggiore, to whom it was momentarily handed over before being returned to his wife, Rachele Guidi.

Legnano figures among the decorated cities after the war. The city was awarded the bronze medal for military valor for the sacrifices of its population and for its activity in the partisan struggle during the conflict.

=== From post-World War II to the 21st century ===
==== Reconstruction and economic boom ====
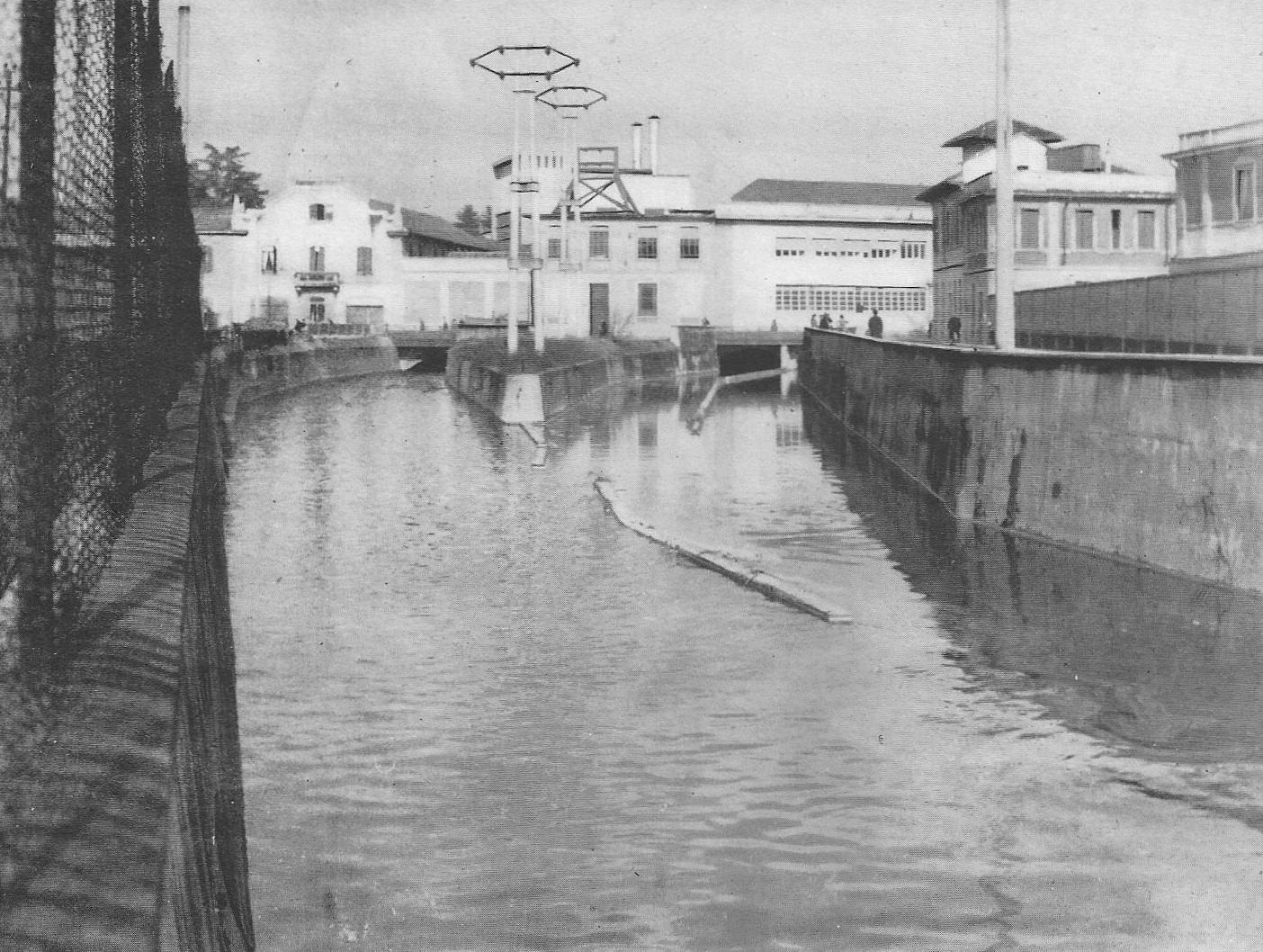
The Olona River running through the area that was later covered becoming Carroccio Square. The Dell'Acqua Cotton Mill can be recognized in the background. The image dates back to February 1955

After the war Legnano was affected, like the rest of Italy, by the severe economic recession that followed the conflict. Basic foodstuffs were insufficient, public transportation was lacking, and roads were bad. On June 2, 1945, the municipal council met for the first time since the Fascist dictatorship. The reconstruction phase after the destruction of the war was long and difficult, but eventually the city recovered from the crisis and returned to economic growth as well. In the 1950s the sewerage (work began in 1946), street lighting and drinking water networks were extended, while a plan to asphalt all municipal roads was begun.

With Italian politics also having been stabilized, the economic system in Legnano began to develop again, returning to the growth rate of the pre-World War II period also thanks to the Marshall Plan. During Italy's strong economic growth during the economic boom, Legnano achieved between 1951 and 1961 the second highest rate – nationally – of employees in industry relative to inhabitants (65.2 percent), second only to Sesto San Giovanni (67.14 percent). Among the textile industries, in 1951, the largest was Cotonificio Cantoni with as many as 3,465 employees, followed by De Angeli-Frua (1,504), Cotonificio Dell'Acqua (1,495), Agosti Dye Works (1,393), Manifattura di Legnano (1,165), Giulini & Ratti Dye Works (972) and Cotonificio Bernocchi (851).

In the engineering sector, Franco Tosi dominated (more than 4,800 employees), followed by Ercole Comerio (454), Mario Pensotti (387), Bozzi (331), Industrie Elettriche di Legnano (253), and the SAFFES foundry (246). Other notable industries were Officine Fontana, Fratelli Gianazza, Ranzi (employing 150 to 200 workers each), and Calzaturificio di Legnano (145). There were 694 companies with fewer than 25 employees, again in 1951, employing a total of 3,060 employees. In this context, Legnano was involved in an important migratory phenomenon concerning the arrival of immigrants from the Triveneto and Southern Italy, who settled permanently in the city with their families.

==== The crisis of industry ====
The golden age of Legnano industry, which began in the 1880s, ended in the 1960s. Thereafter, Legnano experienced a long period of crisis that led to the closure of many manufacturing businesses. This unfavorable conjuncture was caused by rising labor costs and competition from foreign industrial systems, to which were added the periodic crises that cyclically affect production systems and – in the 1970s – the inconvertibility of the dollar (1971), the oil crisis and the Kippur War (both in 1973). In the wake of these events, the De Angeli-Frua (1955), Dell'Acqua (1965) and Bernocchi (1971) cotton mills, Agosti (1967) dye works, Giulini & Ratti (1974) dye works, Cantoni cotton mills (in 1984 the factory that was built along the Olona River and in 2004 the factory in the Olmina district) closed, the mechanics Mario Pensotti (1989) and Andrea Pensotti (1994), and – because of the great recession that began in 2007 – the Manifattura di Legnano, the Tintostamperia Mottana (both in 2008), and Giovanni Crespi (2014). It was thus a general and lasting crisis, which affected the various traditional industrial sectors in Legnano, from textiles to mechanical engineering, chemicals and footwear.

The rate of employees in industry in relation to the inhabitants in 1981 dropped to 29.6 percent (with this percentage, Legnano dropped to 141st place nationwide), while the industrial fabric of Legnano, as the decades passed, went through a phase where the average size of companies decreased: from 23 employees in 1951, it went to 20 in 1961, 17 in 1971 to 16 in 1978. At the same time, a phase of the birth of small companies began, which allowed Legnano to remain included in a highly advanced productive context, still placing it in the 21st century among the most developed and industrialized areas in Italy. Many former industrial areas were then reconverted to other uses, often with the disappearance of evidence of industrial archaeology; the beginning came with the area once occupied by De Angeli-Frua, which was the first major Legnano company to go bankrupt.

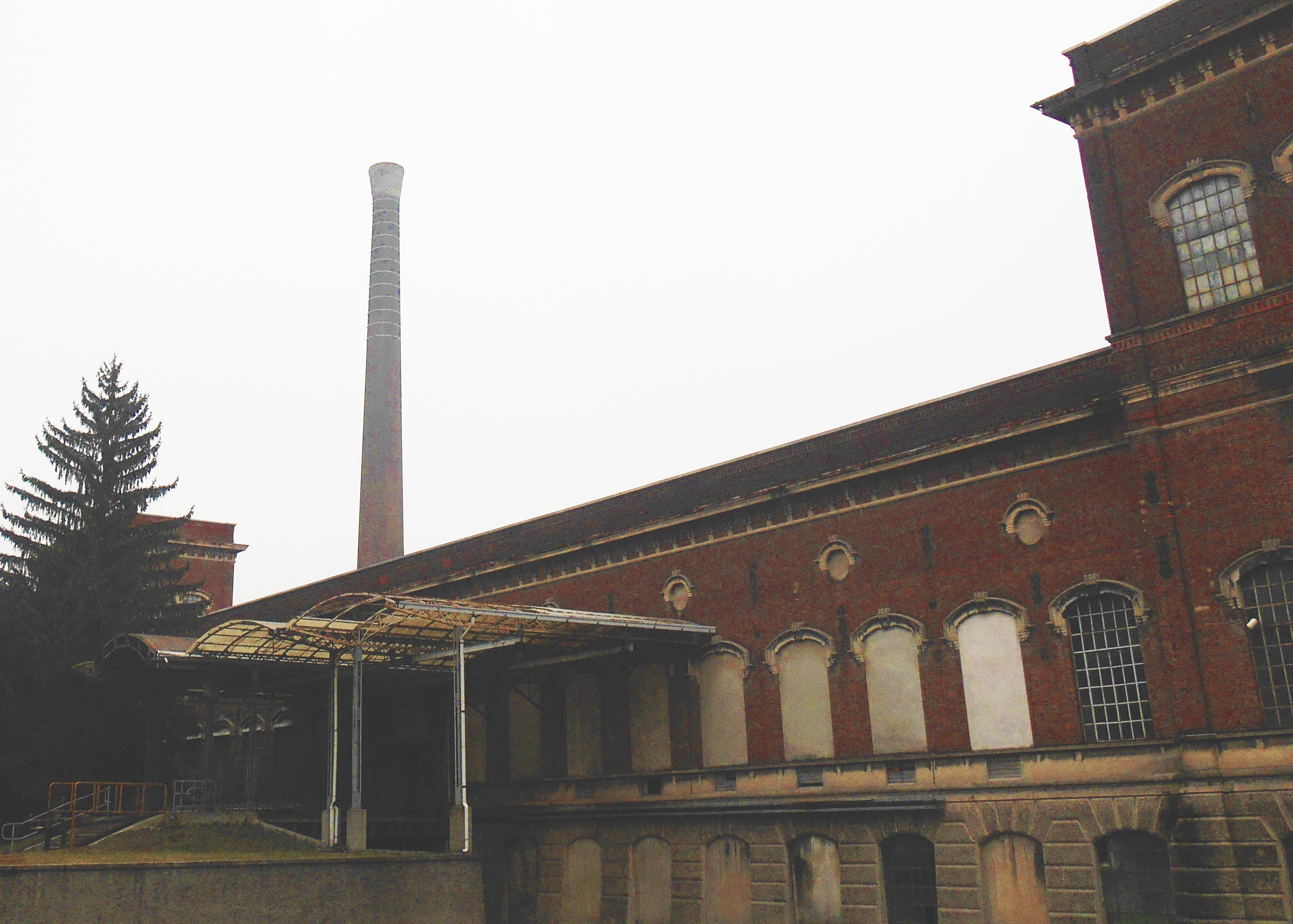
Glimpse of the Legnano factory of the Manifattura di Legnano

The economy of Legnano veered toward the tertiary sector; in particular, there was strong growth in manufacturing services, telecommunications, insurance, transportation, financial management, banking services, and, to a lesser extent, legal and computer services. An exception to this dynamic was the founding in Legnano in 1985 of the Dolce & Gabbana fashion company.

The rate of development of the tertiary sector, however, did not lead to sufficient growth to make up for the disappearance of the large industrial complexes of the past, and this led to a major social change: from being the seat of important industries and a destination city for employees in the area, Legnano turned into a center of heavy commuting, especially to Milan.

As of December 1999, the largest entities, public or private, employing people in Legnano were the Civil Hospital (1,714 employees), Franco Tosi (1,600), the municipality (383), the Bank of Legnano (345), and the Legnano Factory (335). In the same year there were 1,650 businesses in Legnano, including retail and wholesale, public places and street vendors, which experienced a new phase of growth after the stagnation of the 1970s.

==== 21st century ====
It was on May 8, 2000 that Tecnocity was inaugurated, a technological citadel aimed at fostering a process of reindustrialization in the Legnano area through the exploitation of European, state and regional funds. Of great significance, this time in the sports sphere, is the organization in Legnano, from June 15 to 20, 2012, of the XXV edition of the European Fencing Championships. The competitions were held at PalaBorsani in Castellanza and at the Visconti Castle in Legnano.

== See also ==
- History of Milan
- Legnano
- Cotta Castle
- Lombard Courtyard
