= Visconti Castle (Legnano) =

Castle in Legnano, Italy

- Castello Visconteo di Legnano
- Legnano
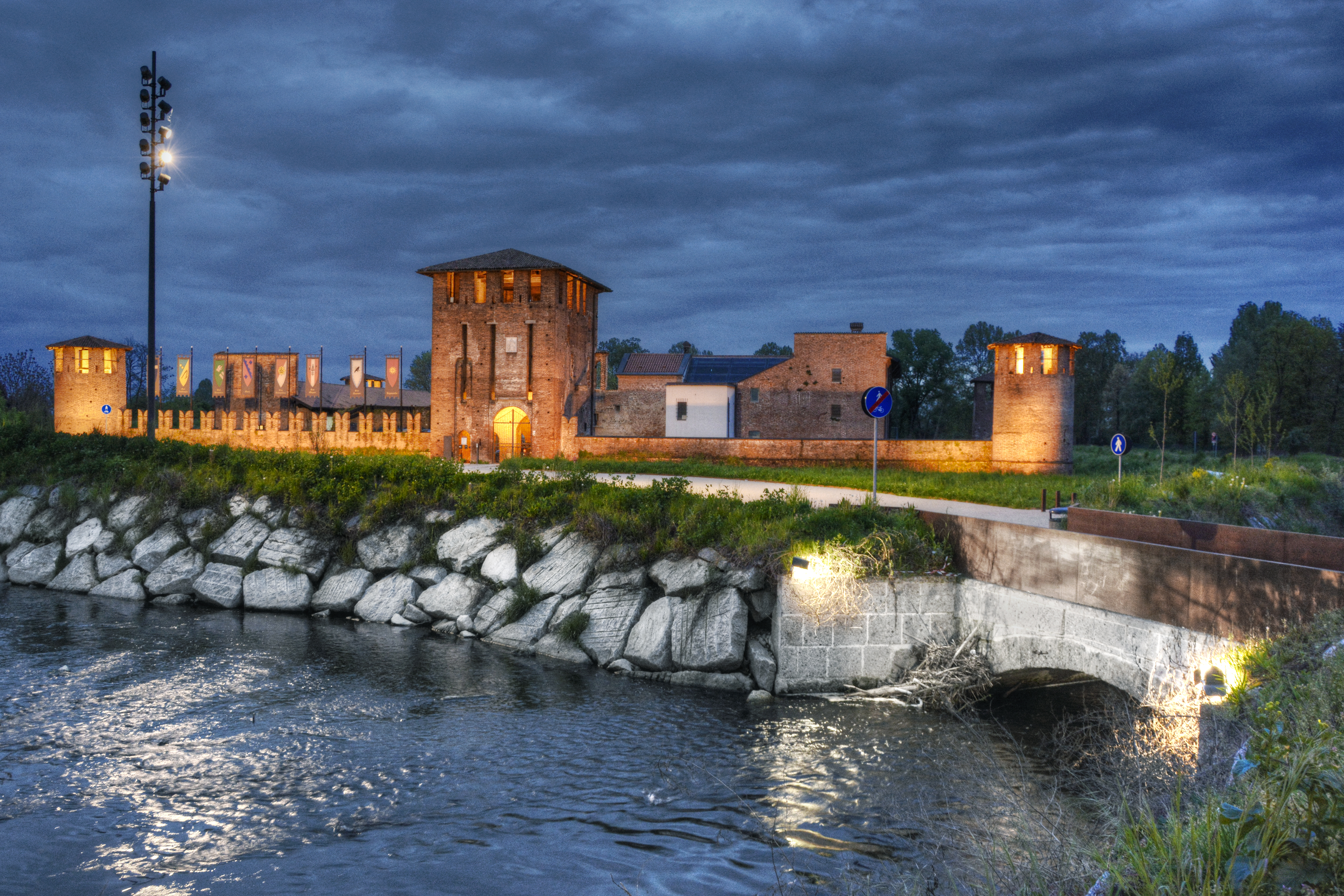
- Night view with the Olona river in the foreground

Site information
- Type: Medieval castle
- Owner: Municipality of Legnano
- Open to the public: Yes
- Condition: Good (survived portions)

Location
- Location within Northern Italy
- Coordinates: 45°35′09″N 8°55′29″E

Site history
- Built: 13th–15th centuries
- Built by: Della Torre, Visconti houses, Oldrado II Lampugnani
- Materials: Bricks
- Battles/wars: 1449: It was besieged and conquered by Francesco Piccinino, opponent of Francesco Sforza; 1524: attack by Teodoro Trivulzio, which caused a fire that severely damaged the entire complex; 1526: Unsuccessful siege by the imperial troops of Charles V of Habsburg
- Events: 1287: A peace table was organized in Legnano, probably at the castle, between Guido da Castiglione and Ottone Visconti; 1339: Lodrisio Visconti, before waging war against Azzone and Luchino Visconti, decided to establish his headquarters in Legnano, probably at the castle

Garrison information
- Past commanders: Napoleone della Torre; Ottone Visconti; Oldrado II Lampugnani
- Constructed in medieval and baroque style. (Note: Some of the exterior decorations of the buildings are in baroque style.)

The Visconti Castle is a medieval fortification that stands south of Legnano on a natural island in the Olona River. It has also been known as the castle of San Giorgio (lat. Castrum Sancti Georgi) since the 13th century. The architectural complex is located on Viale Toselli, between Castello Park and Piazza I Maggio.

== Strategic function ==
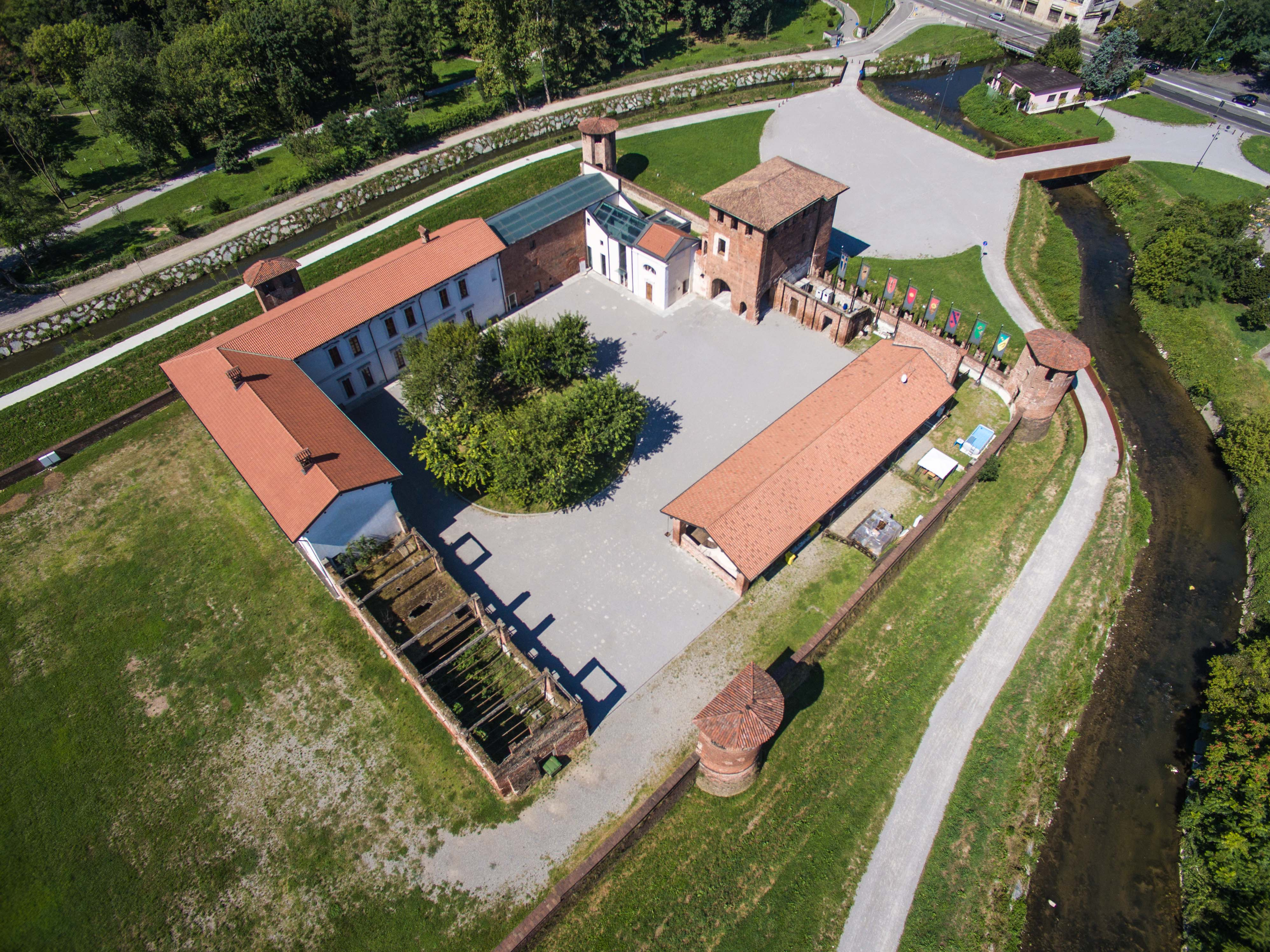
Aerial view of the castle

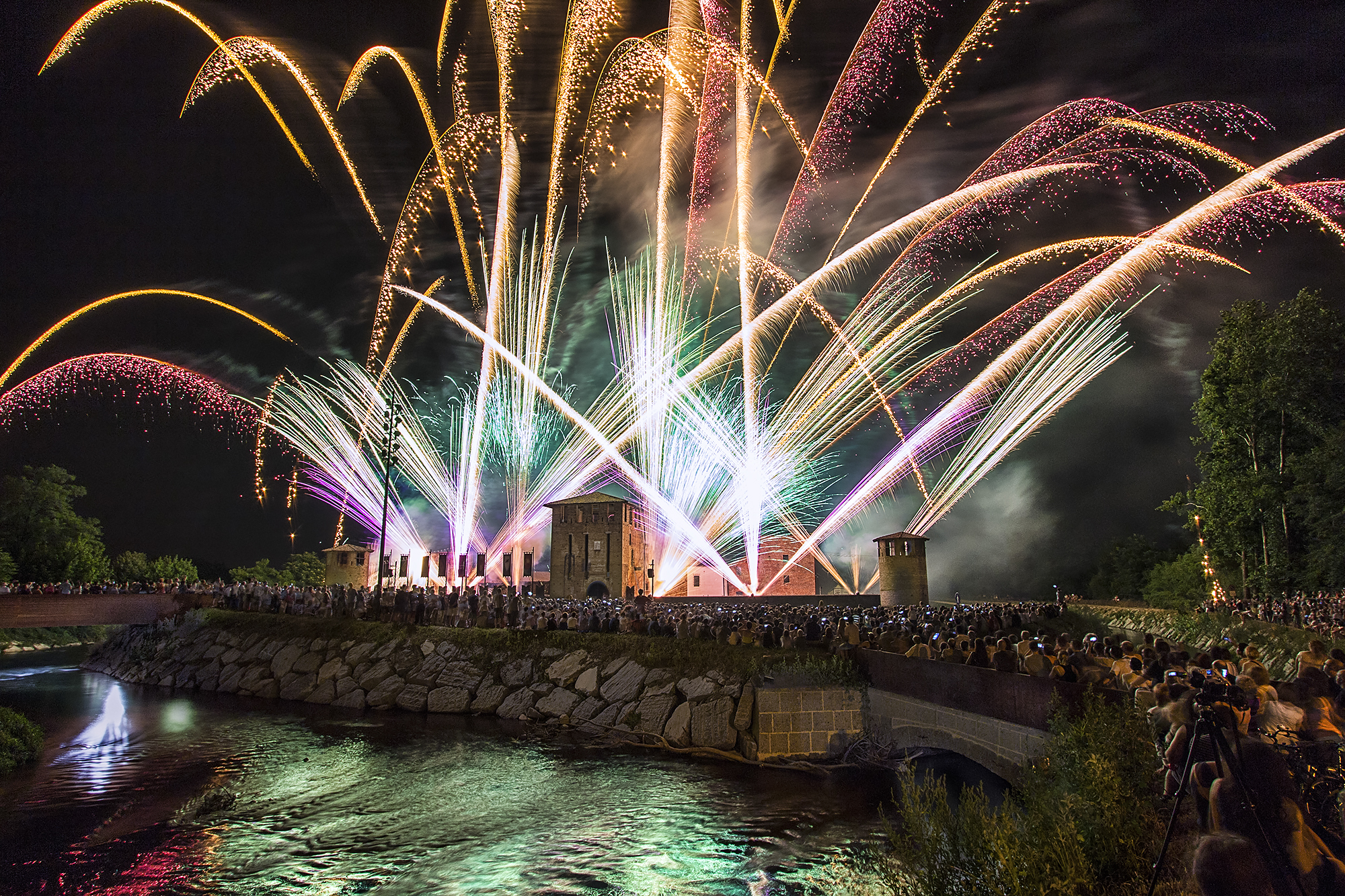
The Legnano castle during the Castello in festa event, 2015 edition

The presence of a castle in Legnano is linked to the strategic function the city of Carroccio had from the Middle Ages to the 16th century. Legnano was located along an important medieval communication route that ran along the Olona River and connected Mediolanum (modern Milan) with the Verbannus Lacus (Lake Verbano, i.e., Lake Maggiore), the Via Severiana Augusta, which existed since Roman times. The modern Simplon road, built during the Napoleonic era, echoes in its layout the ancient road in use in Roman and medieval times.

The defense of Legnano was important because its eventual conquest could allow Milan's enemies easy access to the northwestern Milanese countryside due to the fact that it was located at the outlet of the Olona Valley, which ends at Castellanza and to aim, through this road, at the Milanese capital. In the Middle Ages Legnano, although formally belonging to Seprio, gravitated around Milan. The link between Milan and the city of the Carroccio was not only military, but also economic: Legnano and the other contadi that gravitated around the capital of Milan also supplied Milan with part of the foodstuffs produced.

When it belonged to the Viscontis, the castle of Legnano was part of a larger defensive system of the belt that enclosed Milan. In particular, fortifications were located in places where the Visconti owned a greater amount of real estate. The castles located around Milan served their function both for military purposes, mainly for external attacks and internal civil wars within the Milanese lordship, and for other purposes. They were also used as summer vacation spots, which allowed the lords to leave the city during the hottest months, during which water was scarce and heat prevailed, aided by the proximity of city buildings: at the time, dwellings in Milan were divided by narrow streets. Another use was the organization of hunting parties in the woods located near the castles, a sport that was very common in the 12th and 13th centuries.

In the Upper Milanese area, castles were numerous. The fortresses of Crenna, Somma Lombardo, Orago, Cassano Magnago, Fagnano Olona and Turbigo have also come down to the 21st century, while Busto Arsizio, Gallarate and Saronno possessed castles, later destroyed over the centuries.

In the 16th century, the village experienced a phase of decline, as it began to untie itself from Milan and gradually lost its strategic function; in this way, it turned from an important military outpost into a simple agricultural center. Already since the previous century, Seprio lost its rebellious attitude toward Milan, and thus the presence of fixed troops on the border of the Milanese countryside was no longer justified. As a result, the castle also lost its military function. For this reason, no artillery gun emplacements are found on the towers of the castle, which in fact began to spread on the battlefields precisely in the 16th century.

== History ==
=== Origins: the convent of St. George ===
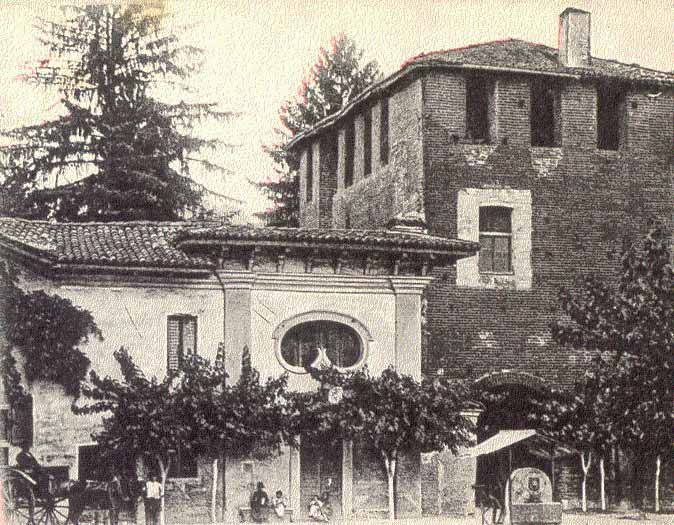
The inner courtyard of the castle in a 1905 image. To the left of the main keep, the small church dedicated to St. George can be glimpsed

The origins of Legnano Castle are linked to an ancient convent of Augustinians dedicated to Saint George, whose presence is documented as early as 1231. However, this religious building does not appear in the register of churches in Goffredo da Bussero's Liber Notitiae Sanctorum Mediolani, which describes the religious context of the Milan area in the late 13th and early 14th centuries.

This monastery, which included a small church also dedicated to St. George, owned much of the arable land that extended beyond Legnano to Canegrate, San Vittore Olona, Villa Cortese and Dairago. The dedication of the convent and the small church to St. George may have been related to the cult of this saint, which may have been common in the surrounding countryside and which would then have influenced the choice of the monastery's dedication, or the opposite may have happened, that is, the popular cult of St. George would have spread through the dedication of the convent and the small church. It is likely that the presence of this monastery later led to the dedication of not only the castle but also a district of Legnano (the "Costa di San Giorgio") and the neighboring municipality of San Giorgio su Legnano to St. George. Hypotheses discarded by scholars consider instead that the reference to the saint derives from the municipality of San Giorgio su Legnano, which in the early 15th century was known as locus Sancti Georgi Plebis Parabiaghi Duc. Mlni ("locality of San Giorgio, of the parish of Parabiago, Duchy of Milan").

The presence of ecclesiastical properties in Legnano is evidenced by documents dating back several centuries before the mentioned written deed of 1231. The first document that mentions archiepiscopal properties located in the village of Legnano dates back to October 23, 789, thus in Frankish times: it deals with an exchange of land located in Legnanello between Pietro I Oldrati, archbishop of Milan, and the monastery of Sant'Ambrogio of Milan. This document, which is also the first that mentions the village, reads:

[...] curtem proprietatis nostre in Leunianello [...]
[...] with our properties in Legnanello [...]

—Lombard Diplomatic Codex, number LIV

Other evidence of the presence in Legnano of conspicuous landed properties belonging to the Church was the so-called "Braida Arcivescovile," which was a natural island formed by the Olona River and one of its secondary branches, the Olonella, located east of the modern basilica of San Magno and named so because it was owned by the archdiocese of Milan.

=== The convent of San Giorgio is passed on to the Della Torre family ===
The monks of the convent of San Giorgio, as shown in an ancient document, were subjected to harassment by some powerful people in the area ("magnates et potentes") who had settled on land bordering those of the archbishopric. This situation was a consequence of the struggles between the Milanese archbishopric and some nobles, a war that was a direct consequence of the events that followed the Battle of Legnano (May 29, 1176): after the victory of Legnano, the medieval Lombard communes became enfranchised from imperial power and their entire population obtained the possibility of electing consuls. Previously, the government of cities was held by the bishop, the nobles and the upper class: in particular, Milan was governed by a lordship at the apex of which was the archbishop although, formally, the city had a republican form of government.

A proponent of the return of archiepiscopal supremacy over the city's government against the claims of the people was the archbishop of Milan Leone da Perego, who engaged in a struggle with some local nobles who, on the other hand, were part of the faction in favor of the new political situation that had arisen after the Battle of Legnano: the most important noble family that opposed Leone da Perego was the Della Torre family. In 1257, upon the death of Leone da Perego, it was not immediately clear who would prevail over the lordship of Milan: after a phase characterized by a heated dispute between the various factions, the family that managed to impose itself was eventually that of the Della Torre. Therefore, when Leone da Perego died, the Della Torre family began to occupy all the archiepiscopal properties in the Milanese countryside. The Milanese noble family also decided to take possession of the Milanese convent of San Giorgio, given its strategic location, taking advantage of the vacant archiepiscopal see. More generally, the Della Torre family in this area acquired several landed properties between Legnano and Dairago.

In order to avoid unpleasant consequences, and considering the political situation of the time, which was unstable and characterized by continuous wars, the friars decided to abandon the monastery by signing on October 14, 1261 a notarial deed of exchange with the brothers Raimondo, Napoleone and Francesco della Torre and their nephew Erecco, although it is not known whether of their own free will or forcibly obliged. The motivation for this choice, as can be read on this document, is described as follows:

[...] [The monks] are in the midst of perverse and powerful people residing in Legnano, so that they cannot live quietly without danger to their persons and the property of the Church [...]. [...] [The Church of St. George] has been abandoned and almost destroyed for more than 30 years because of the above-mentioned injustices [...].

— Deed of cession of the early convent and surrounding land to the Della Torre family

The main motivation for the local nobles to put great pressure on the monks lay in their claim to have a voice in the appointment of chapter members: the various lineages in fact coveted the chance to have their own relatives in this assembly that could have influenced the chapter's choices in their favor. As the documents show, the chapter of the monastery, at the time of its cession to the Della Torre family, consisted of the provost Ruggero de Quinque Viis, known as Cippus, and others by three clergymen, Guiscardo da Viggiù, Guido Lampugnani and Mainfredo Toppus.

On the other hand, the monks obtained 1,400 perches of fertile and well-watered land in Limito and the church of San Primo in Milan. Notably, the land, shortly before the exchange, was not in the possession of the Della Torre family and therefore was acquired for the occasion. The Della Torre family paid a considerable amount of money for the purchase of the land located in Limito: this confirms that this family considered the acquisition of the monastery, which was considered of significant strategic value, to be very important.

The monastery and surrounding lands were later acquired by the Della Torre and Lampugnani families, that is, the two families that had harassed the monks along with the inhabitants of the Meraviglia farmstead. The Della Torre family also acquired, through the same deed of exchange, some buildings in Legnano, two mills on the Olona River and several properties between the parishes of Dairago and Parabiago. In this way, the noble family of Milan carried out a real occupation of the land and the economy of the Alto Milanese.

=== The Della Torre family transforms the convent into a fortified castle ===
When the canons left, a small watchtower existed at the convent. This military outpost had the function of controlling the aforementioned road that connected Milan to northwestern Lombardy. Presumably this original tower was built in 1231 by the Della Torre family when they settled on the land of the archbishopric just before the war they engaged in with Leone da Perego. According to other studies, the tower may have been built by Uberto Visconti instead.

Shortly after the Della Torre family purchased the convent, on July 22, 1262, Ottone Visconti was appointed archbishop of Milan, ending the vacant archiepiscopal see. Ottone belonged to a noble family, the Visconti, which in the struggle between the people and the archbishopric sided with the latter: the Della Torre family tried to have their brother Raimondo elected archbishop in vain. However, Ottone Visconti did not succeed in occupying the archiepiscopal seat, but remained an exile in areas outside the diocese: in this context, the Della Torre continued their work of acquiring and occupying archiepiscopal property in the diocese of Milan. In Legnano, in particular, they further expanded their possessions, making the village one of their military strongholds.

The warlike operations between the Viscontis and Della Torre, however, took place far from Legnano, mainly around Lake Maggiore, and thus the village of Legnano experienced a relatively quiet period. The exception was the passage of the Milanese army to Legnano in 1285: the first time was on the occasion of the shift of war operations to Seprio, which took place in April of that year, while the second was a few months later, in July 1285, during the siege of Castelseprio.

Between 1261 and 1273, as a confirmation of their strong control over the Legnanese, the Della Torre family expanded the former monastery building by constructing two wings - one to the right and the other to the left of the original tower - which became the original core of the castle perhaps incorporating - if they were not demolished earlier - the former convent and the small church of San Giorgio. Partial preservation of the former monastery is not ruled out because the style in use at the time, exposed brick and pointed arch windows, was common to all constructed buildings except for very few variations, and thus served the purpose.

Legnano Castle hosted for one night in April 1273 the English royals Edward I of England and Eleanor of Castile on their way back from a trip to the Middle East. The two guests were taken to the Legnano castle, thus considered a prestigious residence, by Napoleone and Francesco della Torre. However, a legend says that the two royals instead stopped at the so-called "Queen's House" in San Giorgio su Legnano. This event demonstrates the firm control that the Della Torre family had over the Legnano village, so much so that they could safely afford to accommodate two sovereigns. On documents of the time, the event is described by mentioning that the English royals were hosted "at Santo Georgio near Legnano."

=== The Visconti ===
In 1277 the building passed to the Viscontis following the defeat suffered by Napoleone della Torre in the Battle of Desio (January 21, 1277) at the hands of the Archbishop of Milan Ottone Visconti, which caused the expulsion of the Della Torre family from Milan and its countryside. The latter fled northward and occupied, in 1285, Castelseprio. Ottone Visconti decided to move toward the Della Torre stronghold by settling in Legnano, where he gathered his army. War, however, was temporarily avoided: the two sides met in Varese to sign a truce, which provided for the abandonment of Castelseprio by the Della Torre, whose place was taken by Guido da Castiglione, their associate.

Ottone regained all the properties taken by the Della Torre from Leone da Perego, namely the Braida Arcivescovile, the castle of Legnano and all other landed properties. In particular, the small church of the castle was assigned on December 16, 1277, to the mensa of the chapter of the ordinaries, who also obtained the annuity of some lands bordering the castle, given their economic situation, which had worsened a lot with the presence of the Della Torre family.

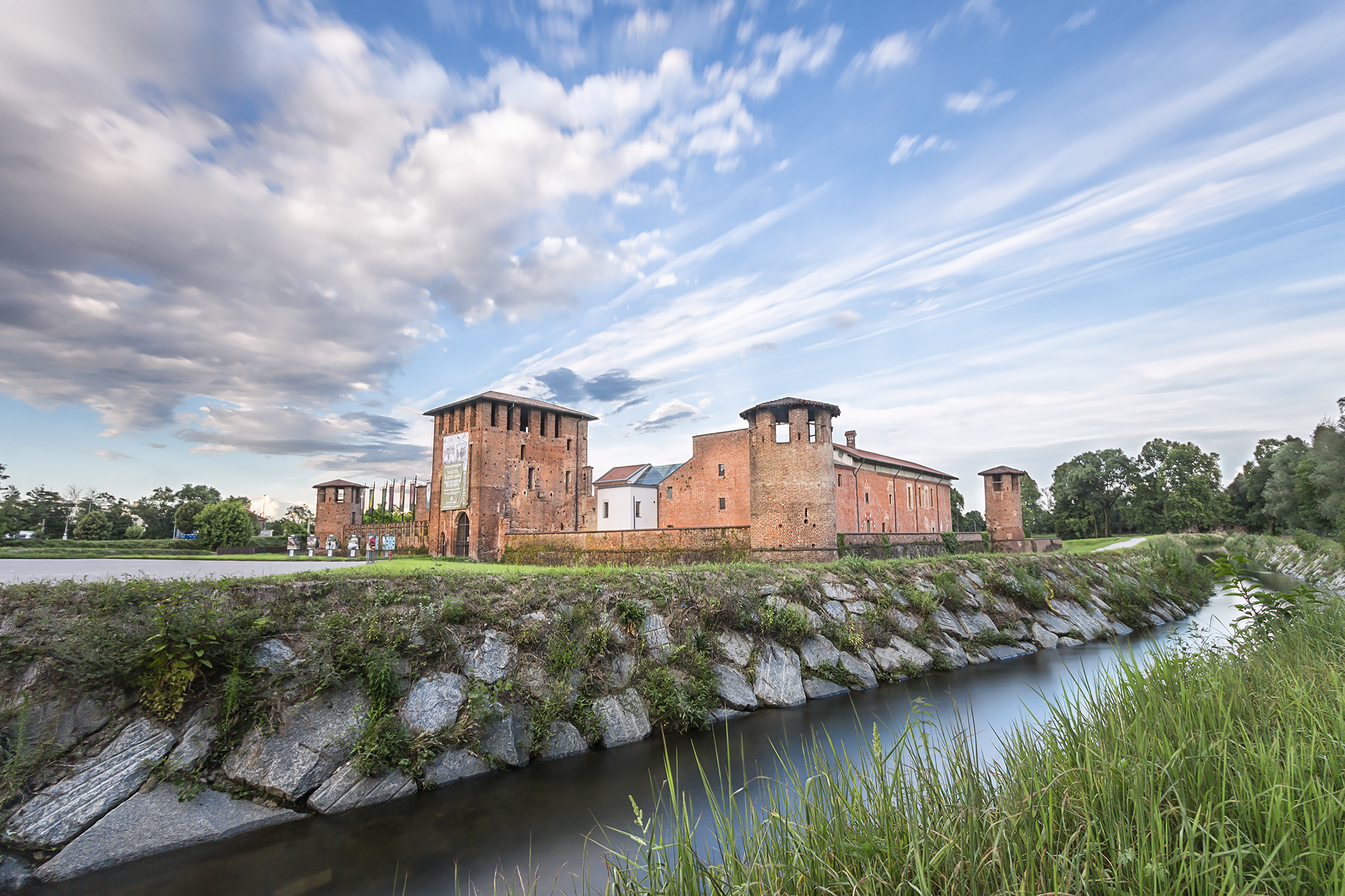
The Visconti castle of Legnano in 2015

Ottone Visconti then decided to establish his residence at the castle of Legnano because he preferred it, as a military outpost, to the Braida Arcivescovile: although the latter was located in the city center of Legnano, Ottone Visconti did not consider it suitable for the purpose, because it was not sufficiently secure from a military point of view: the Cotta castle, in fact, was difficult to expand unless a too large number of houses in the city center were demolished. The archbishop then granted the castle's small church of St. George the use of a consecrated altar in December 1277.

In the fall of 1286 Ottone Visconti decided to break the truce by gathering a new army in Legnano. He then attacked Castelseprio, still ruled by Guido da Castiglione, which partially surrendered: Ottone managed to sack the town but not the fortress, which resisted. In February 1287 a peace table between the two contenders was organized in Legnano, probably at the castle, but to no avail. Castelseprio then capitulated on March 28, 1287, when it was razed to the ground by Ottone Visconti, who managed to conquer it.

In 1339 Legnano was again affected by political and military events related to Milan. In the mentioned year Lodrisio Visconti, with the intention of becoming lord of Milan by ousting Azzone and Luchino Visconti, decided to establish his headquarters in Legnano, perhaps at the Visconti Castle. The armed clash between the two fractions occurred not far from Legnano, at the Battle of Parabiago (February 21, 1339). In particular, Lodrisio had hired three hundred mercenaries of English origin who came from Verona and whom he paid with money from tributes paid by the local population. The battle then had as its epilogue the defeat of Lodrisio, who was taken prisoner.

The consequences of this affair continued even after the end of hostilities. Lodrisio's three hundred mercenaries, who were at first hired by Galeazzo II Visconti, left the latter to indulge in the sacking of Legnano, Nerviano, Castano Primo, Vittuone and Sedriano, during which they stole all the valuables found in local houses and kidnapped some local nobles. The events related to the Battle of Parabiago were the last endowed of any importance involving Legnano: since 1339 the village was no longer a protagonist in the history of Italy. To return to national prominence, Legnano would have to wait for its industrialization, which for the town of Legnano occurred in the 19th century: the pace and scale of this transformation had few other comparable examples on the European continent.

The castle of Legnano and its properties were administered by the Visconti family until the 15th century: the only exceptions were Guido della Torre in 1311, who temporarily succeeded in imposing himself in the lordship of Milan for a short time. In the 15th century, a political and administrative link was created between the Visconti and the Lampugnani, which led to the transfer of the ownership of the castle to the latter noble family.

=== The Lampugnani ===
==== Oldrado II ====
The first Lampugnani to gravitate to the lordly court of the Visconti was Umberto, whose father, Oldrado I, had already performed some services for the lords of Milan. It was Umberto, however, who held important roles in the court: having graduated in law from the University of Pavia, of which he was also a full professor, he was involved by Gian Galeazzo Visconti, due to his academic knowledge, in the administration of the Duchy of Milan. In this context all of Umberto's five sons had the opportunity to be later involved, with different roles, in the administration of the duchy. Prominent among them all was Oldrado II, who later had an important career, so much so that he became tutor to Filippo Maria Visconti, one of Gian Galeazzo's sons.

Upon Gian Galeazzo's death, Giovanni Maria Visconti became Duke of Milan. Upon the latter's untimely death (1412), a civil war broke out that was spearheaded by the captains of fortune and the squires of the Milanese countryside who opposed the rise of Filippo Maria Visconti, the legitimate heir to the throne. Filippo Maria, in order to counter his opponents, turned to Francesco da Bussone, known as "Il Carmagnola," who succeeded in prevailing, after a bloody war, over the duke's enemies. Also playing a role in this war was Oldrado II Lampugnani, who became a close advisor to the duke and who also participated militarily in the activity of opposing the opponents of the Visconti lordship: in particular, Oldrado II succeeded in defeating Gabrino Fondulo, feudatory of Cremona, from whom he also took away all his properties, including the castle of Castelleone, which he handed over to the Visconti. Gabrino Fondulo was then executed in the public square on February 12, 1425. For this reason Filippo Maria, in order to repay him for his services, which were both military and diplomatic, in 1437 gave Oldrado II the castle of Legnano as a gift:

[...] [Filippo Maria Visconti gives] as a gift the castle of Legnano [to Oldrado II Lampugnani] [...].

— Filippo Maria Visconti

Oldrado II Lampugnani had already earlier begun a series of operations aimed at expanding his land holdings with the purchase of several pieces of land, especially around the castle of Legnano. The intent was clear: to one day own the fortress of Legnano. Oldrado II was moved above all by the characteristics of his residence, the Lampugnani Manor, which was located in the historic center of Legnano: this mansion, which was purchased by Oldrado II in 1419, was too stately and not very militaristic, and therefore did not suit, in his opinion, his resolute and warlike character.

He therefore urged his nephew Cristoforo Lampugnani, son of his brother Giovanni, who was already the administrator of his estates and his personal secretary, to purchase large tracts of land along the Olona River and the area planted with vineyards that was close to the castle and that corresponds to the modern Legnano district of Costa di San Giorgio, a total of 857 perches of land distributed in the modern municipalities of Legnano, Canegrate, San Vittore Olona and San Giorgio su Legnano. The milling plant along the Olona River that is now known as the "Cornaggia mill" was also part of this real estate. Specifically, these purchases were made on October 8, 1426, according to a document of the time. 8,706 lire were paid.

One of the reasons that led the Duke of Milan to donate the Legnano castle to Oldrado II was precisely the possession of vast areas around the fortification. The first acquisitions of real estate made by Oldrado II in Legnano, after the acquisition of the Lampugnani Manor, which is dated 1419, date back to a few years earlier, to the two-year period 1421-1422, with the purchase of some land (1421) and a water mill located along the Olona River (1422), assets that were all adjacent to his residence. Other noteworthy acquisitions were made in 1434, when Oldrado II purchased a mill located in San Vittore Olona, thus south of the castle, and in 1436, when he bought a 50-perch piece of land located between Legnano and Rescaldina.

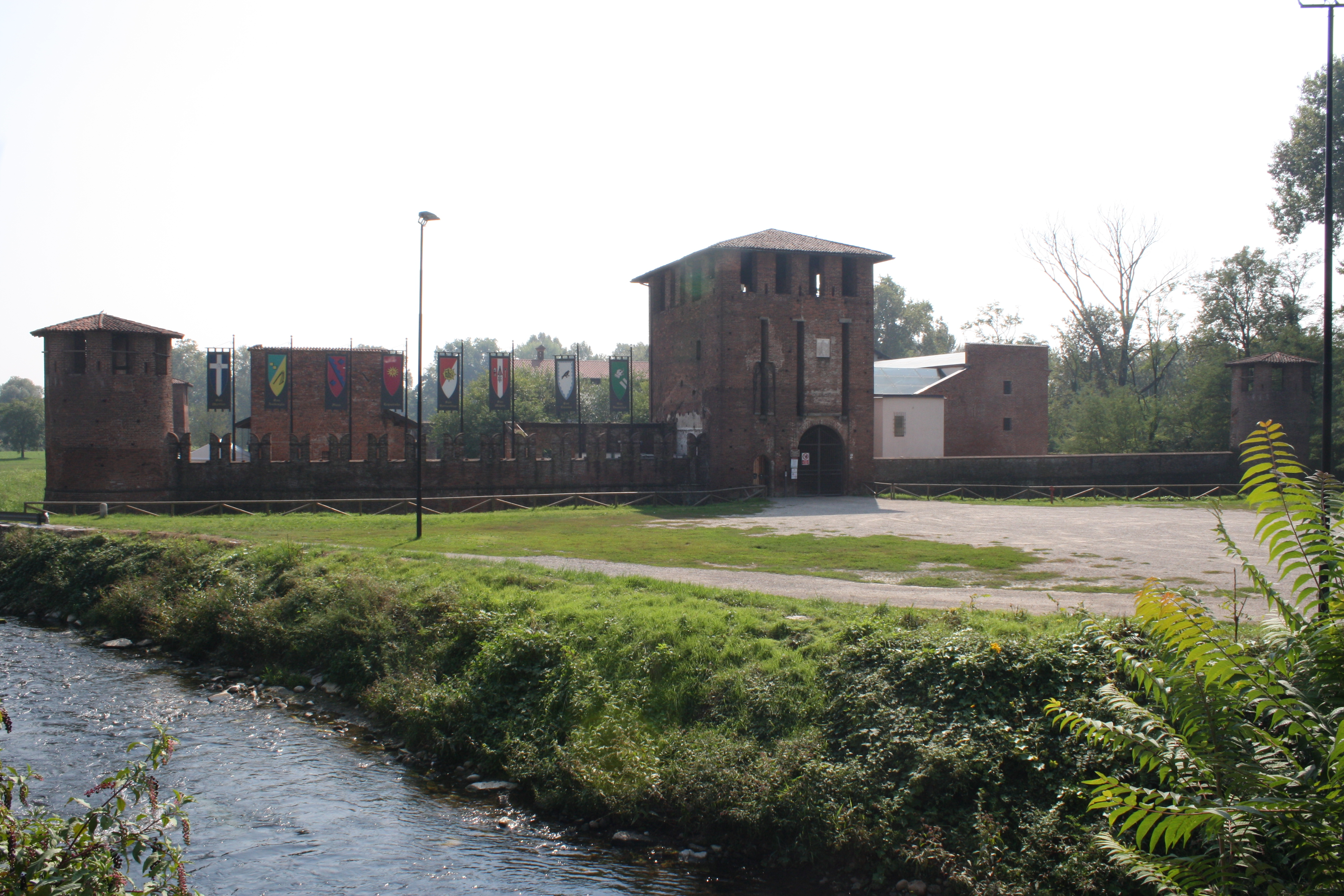
View from the west of the castle before the arrangement of the river banks and the square in front of the structure. On the left, the main branch of the Olona.

In 1445 Lampugnani obtained permission to fortify the building, and the following year he built the towers, defensive walls, a floodable moat and a drawbridge. Until then, as a defensive system, the barrier naturally created by the Olona River was sufficient, but a change in warfare techniques made this further expansion of the castle's defensive infrastructure necessary. With this expansion, the main entrance, which used to be on the west side, was suppressed and a new and larger entrance tower was built. After the fortification, the Visconti castle acquired the role of a defensive bulwark of the northwestern Milanese countryside, replacing in that function the ancient manor of the Cotta family, which was located on the same site as the modern Leone da Perego palace in the city center.

The castle was used by Oldrado II Lampugnani more as a summer residence; however, being fortified, it was still part of the system of military structures that protected Milan from enemy attacks. These outposts, besides being arranged along a wide perimeter around the Milanese capital, were entrusted to families loyal to the lords of Milan. When Oldrado II moved to the castle, the Lampugnani Manor became the official residence of his brother Maffiolo.

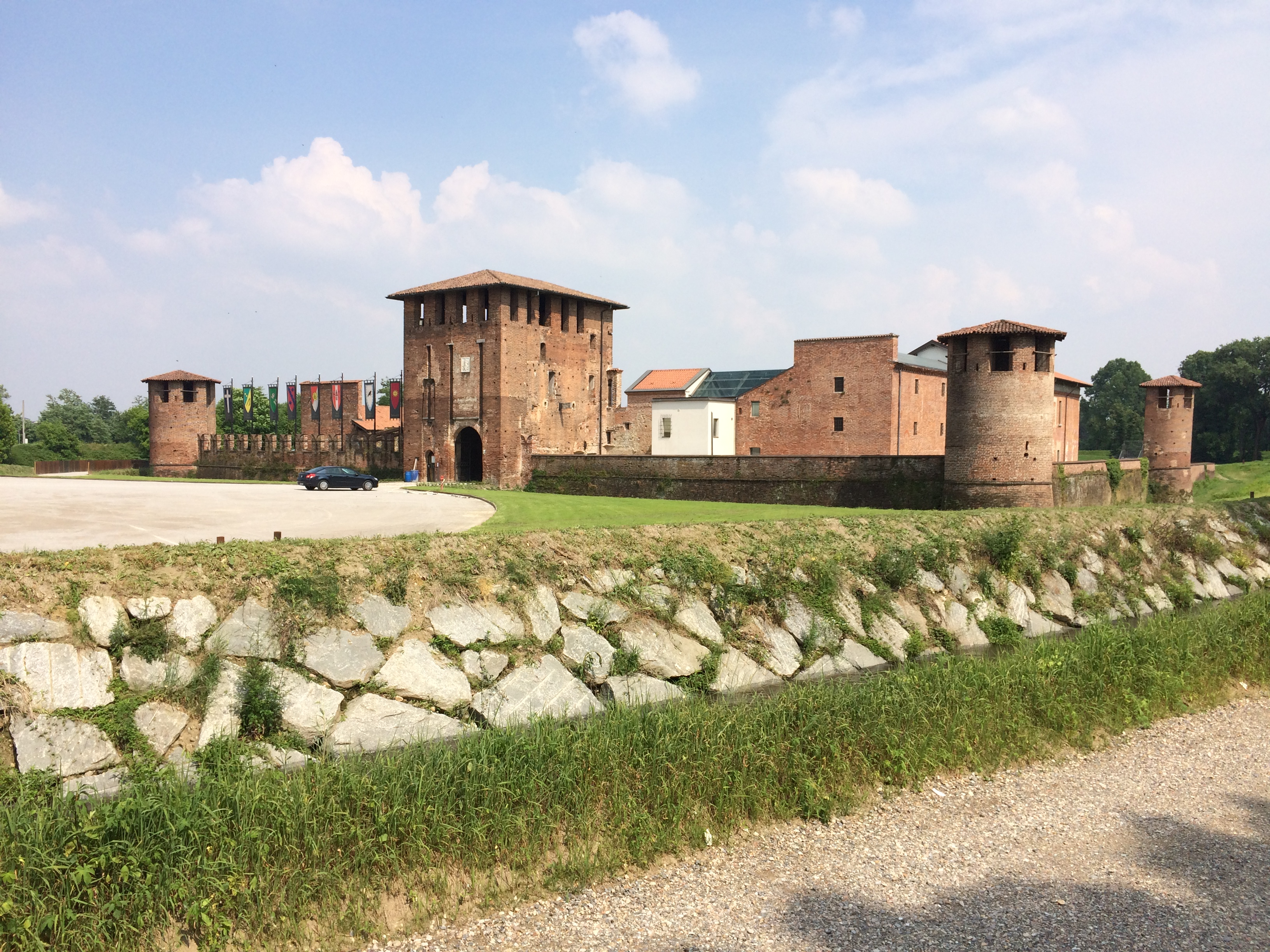
View from the east of the castle after the arrangement of the river banks and the square in front of the fortification. On the right, the secondary branch of the Olona River, the Olonella, which with the main course of the river forms the island on which the fortification stands

In 1448 Legnano was the scene of a phase of the clashes between the Sforzas and the Milanese Republic: part of Francesco Sforza's army, whose goal was to seize the lordship of Milan after the death of Filippo Maria Visconti and the proclamation of the republic, encamped in Legnano after conquering Abbiategrasso; with the support of Oldrado II Lampugnani, these troops then conquered Busto Arsizio despite letters of pleading from its inhabitants, which were sent to the Sforza with the aim of avoiding the attack. For this decisive help to Francesco Sforza, on April 19, 1449, Oldrado II Lampugnani was proclaimed a "rebel" by the Milanese republic: as a consequence, Lampugnani was confiscated of all his property, including his castle. After the truce between the Milanese republic and Francesco Sforza, Oldrado II Lampugnani managed to regain his lost prestige. In 1449, Legnano Castle was besieged and conquered by Francesco Piccinino, Francesco Sforza's opponent during the war of succession to the Duchy of Milan. On a document from 1530, referring to these events, one can read:

[...] After the wheat had been harvested, the Count, together with Carlo Gonzaga and the two Piccinini, who had returned to Milan without doing anything, besieged S. Giorgio, a castle with strong walls and moats, well guarded by many Milanese. [...]

— Document dating back to 1530

==== The successors of Oldrado II ====
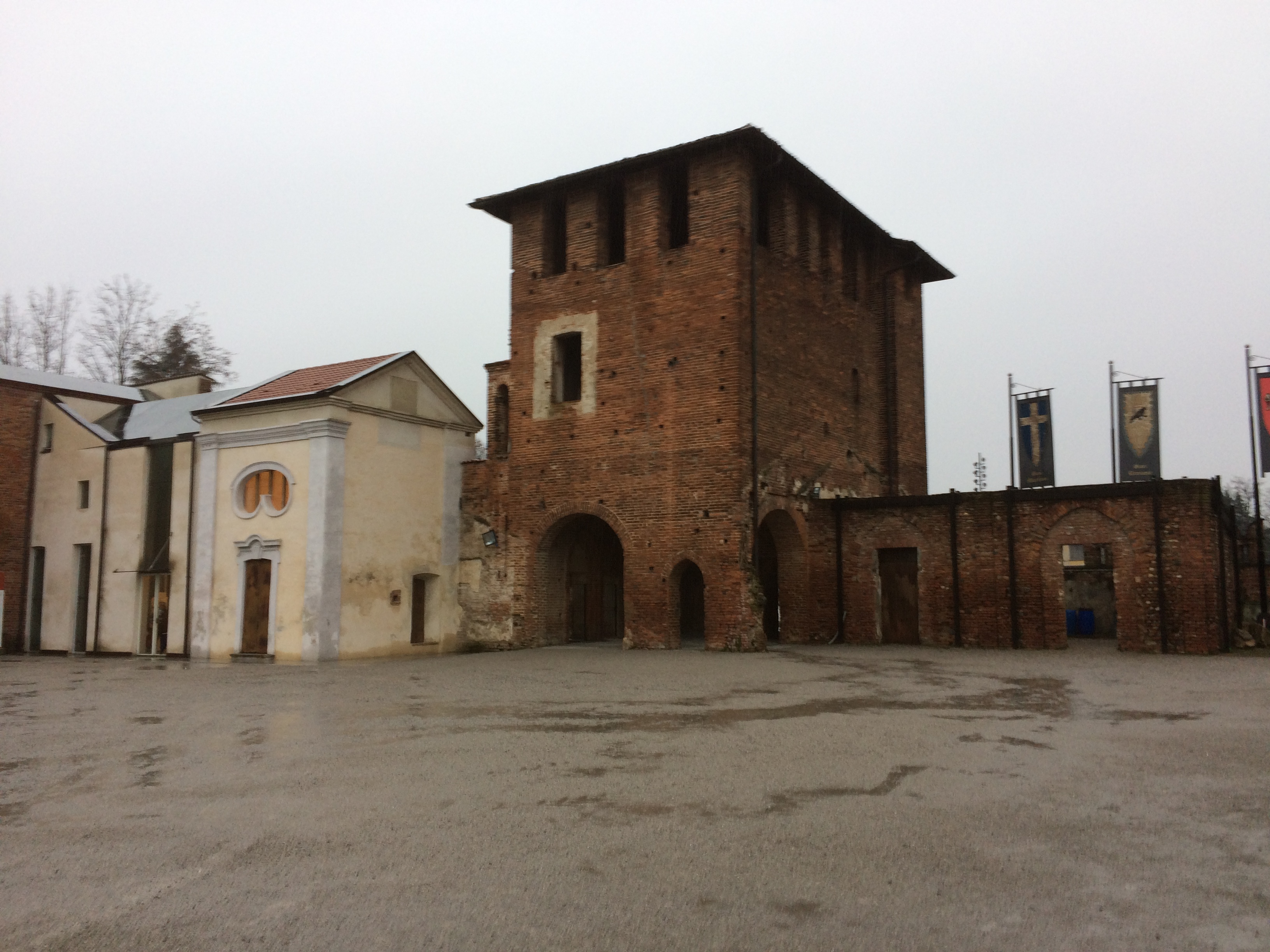
Inner courtyard of the castle. On the left, the small church of San Giorgio

The castle of Legnano, upon the death of Oldrado II, which occurred in 1460, passed to his nephew Giovanni Andrea Lampugnani, the son of his brother Maffiolo, who had meanwhile passed away: Oldrado in fact had no male children. Giovanni Andrea was succeeded by his son Oldrado III Lampugnani as possessor of the Legnanese fortress. Oldrado III, who was later appointed senator of Milan, was forced to flee as an exile to France following Ludovico Sforza, who was dethroned by King Louis XII of France during the French army's invasion of the Duchy of Milan; during his exile, Lampugnani was confiscated of all his property, including Legnano Castle. Commander Teodoro Trivulzio, in retaliation for his loyalty to Ludovico Sforza, in 1524 set fire to the Legnano Castle. Oldrado III, upon his return to the Duchy of Milan, later restored the historic Legnano fortified residence, given the extensive damage suffered from the flames.

Legnano Castle was considered very important from a strategic point of view, so much so that in 1526, during the third Sforza Duchy, the captain of Seprio Giovanni Arcimboldi, who had his headquarters in Gallarate and who also had jurisdiction over Legnano, asked the ducal authorities and the Lampugnani family for the use of the Legnano fortification. In those years the war raged between Francesco II Sforza and Charles V of Habsburg, Emperor of the Holy Roman Empire and King of Spain, and a year after the Battle of Pavia (February 24, 1525), the imperial troops had military dominance in Italy: in particular, in northwestern Lombardy, the Spaniards had their headquarters in Abbiategrasso, from which they were also able to control Legnano. For this reason, Giovanni Arcimboldi asked the Milanese authorities on October 29, 1526, for permission to make use of Legnano Castle, so as to defend both Gallarate and Milan by, among other things, preventing the people of Legnano from paying obols to the Spaniards. The excerpt from the request reads:

[...] and not finding in Seprio a more suitable and convenient place than the castle of Legnano, to ensure that the provisions are not taken by the enemies, as well as to prevent the great contribution that said country makes to the Spaniards of Abbiate, and to keep my company, I have requested said castle from Lord Oldrado Lampugnano, making him understand the great benefit it would be to the country if he would grant me the said castle [...].

— Giovanni Arcimboldi

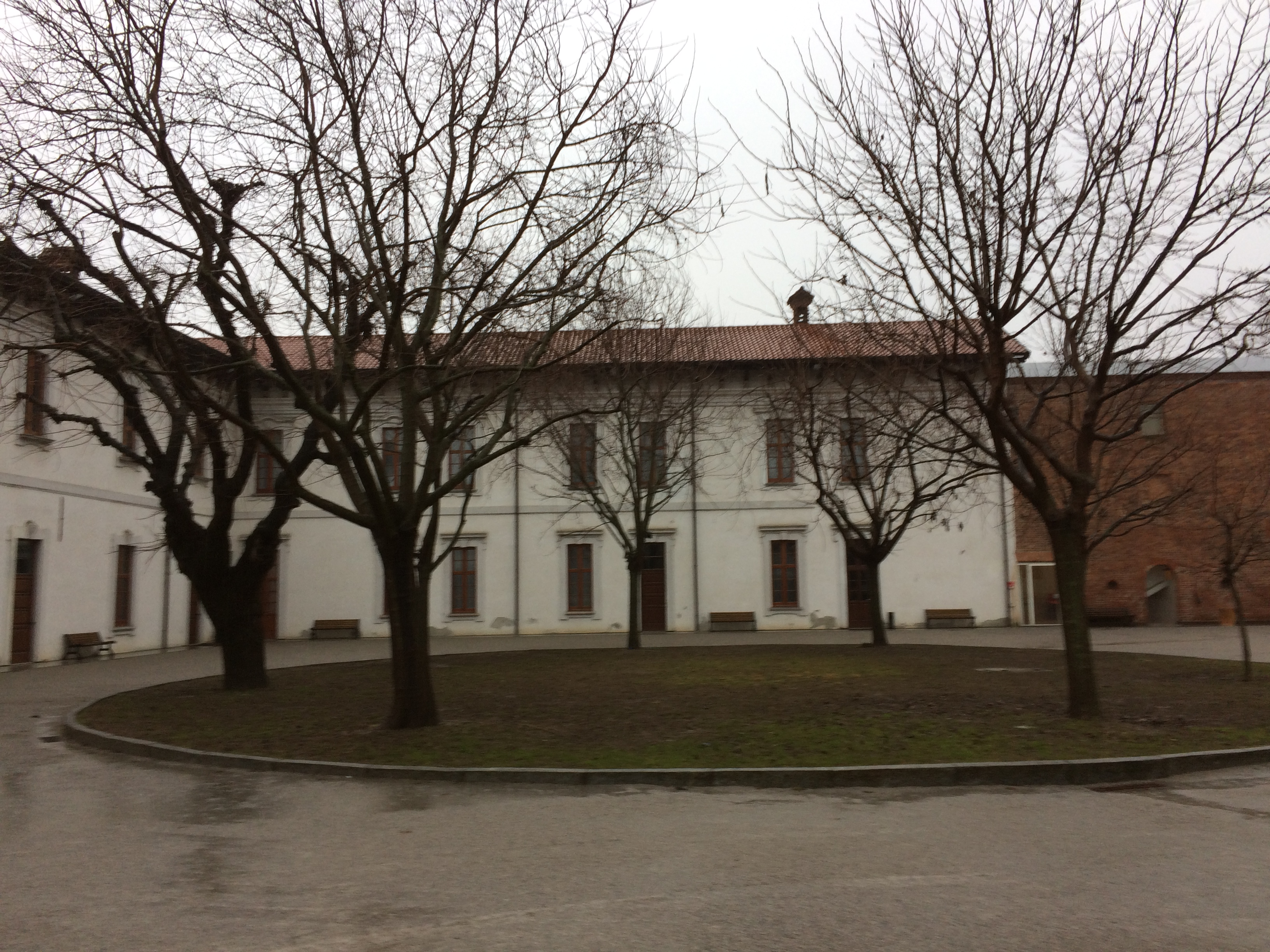
Inner courtyard of the castle. On the left, the part of the castle plastered white in the Baroque style.

Oldrado III Lampugnani then answered affirmatively, but granted the use of the castle to Giovanni Arcimboldi alone and not to his troops, since the Legnanese fortification could not accommodate an entire garrison for reasons of space; another reason lay in the fact that Lampugnani had already denied the use of the castle to the Spaniards and the Duke of Urbino and therefore, in order not to antagonize the latter, he could not give full assent to the other faction. At the end of 1526, the castle of Legnano was subjected to a siege by the imperial troops of Charles V, which was unsuccessful due to the sturdiness of the structure. On an excerpt from a letter dated November 22, 1526, after the siege had already taken place, written by Giovanni Arcimboldi and addressed to the Milanese authorities, one can in fact read:

[...] In another letter of mine, dated the 19th of this month, I wrote to Your Excellency how the enemies had descended to the castle of St. George to enter it, but they did not succeed. [...]

— Giovanni Arcimboldi

Although the castle had begun to lose its strategic importance from the previous century, the subsequent transfer of ownership between members of the Lampugnani family, made necessary by the death of Oldrado III, which occurred in 1528, was not without its problems, as it was characterized by continuous legal disputes that went on for almost two centuries. The legal disputes arose because of the will of Ferdinando Lampugnani, Oldrado III's son, which provided for the passage of the family's vast estates to multiple legitimate heirs and no longer exclusively in the firstborn male line.

The owners of the castle after Ferdinando Lampugnani were Lucrezia and Ottavia Lampugnani, Alessandro Lampugnani, Isabella Lampugnani, Ferdinando II Lampugnani, Francesco Maria I Lampugnani, Giuseppe Lampugnani, Oldrado IV Lampugnani and Ferdinando III Lampugnani. The fortification was owned by the Lampugnani family until 1729, when it was donated to the Policlinico of Milan by the last descendant of the family, Count Francesco Maria II Lampugnani, who had secured the property after succession problems and had no direct heirs. Francesco Maria II was the son of Ferdinando III: he was the sole heir of the castle after the death of his brother Giovanni Andrea II.

=== The Cornaggia ===
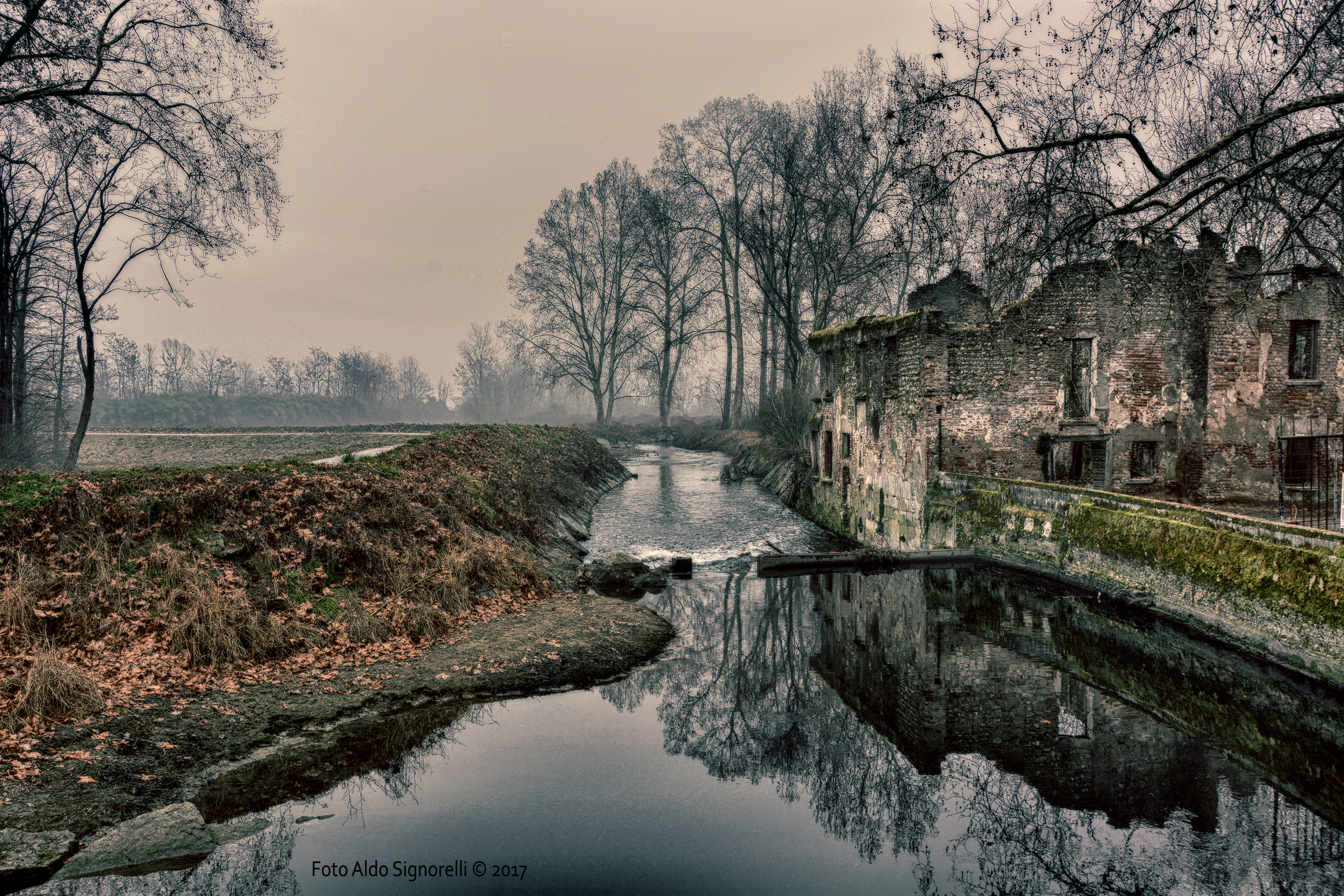
The remains of the Cornaggia mill in Legnano, located downstream from the Visconti castle

In 1798 the castle was purchased by Marquis Carlo Cristoforo Cornaggia for 124,620 lire along with the other properties associated with it, including a water mill along the Olona River, the so-called Cornaggia mill, which is located to the south, not far from the fortification, also on the island where the castle stands. The Cornaggia family was a wealthy family originally from Sedriano that traded cotton and had been present in Legnano since 1598. In 1748 the Cornaggia family expanded their properties, and through the purchase of the "fief on Castellanza" from the Crivelli family, they obtained the noble title of marquis.

The goal of the new owners was to make it their aristocratic home, restoring the structure to its former glory: confirmation of this desire is the addition of their noble coat of arms alongside that of the Lampugnani in the family cartouches. It was Carlo Cristoforo Cornaggia himself who frescoed the right towers with floral motifs. The Cornaggia family used the castle as a summer residence until the end of the 19th century, when they decided not to inhabit it anymore even during the hottest season by staying all year round in their main stately home, which was located in Milan.

As a result, a phase of decline began for the Legnano Castle, as it was no longer followed directly by their owners. In 1883, the Cornaggia family decided to turn the castle into a farm, given the conspicuous landed properties in its surroundings that provided a large amount of hay: from an aristocratic residence it was converted into a simple dwelling for peasants. On this occasion the dairy cattle stables were built, namely the low building that is located, entering from the entrance of the main keep, frontally on the left side, and the similar low building that is located on the left side of the part of the castle used as a noble residence. Originally the number of cattle housed reached about fifty head.

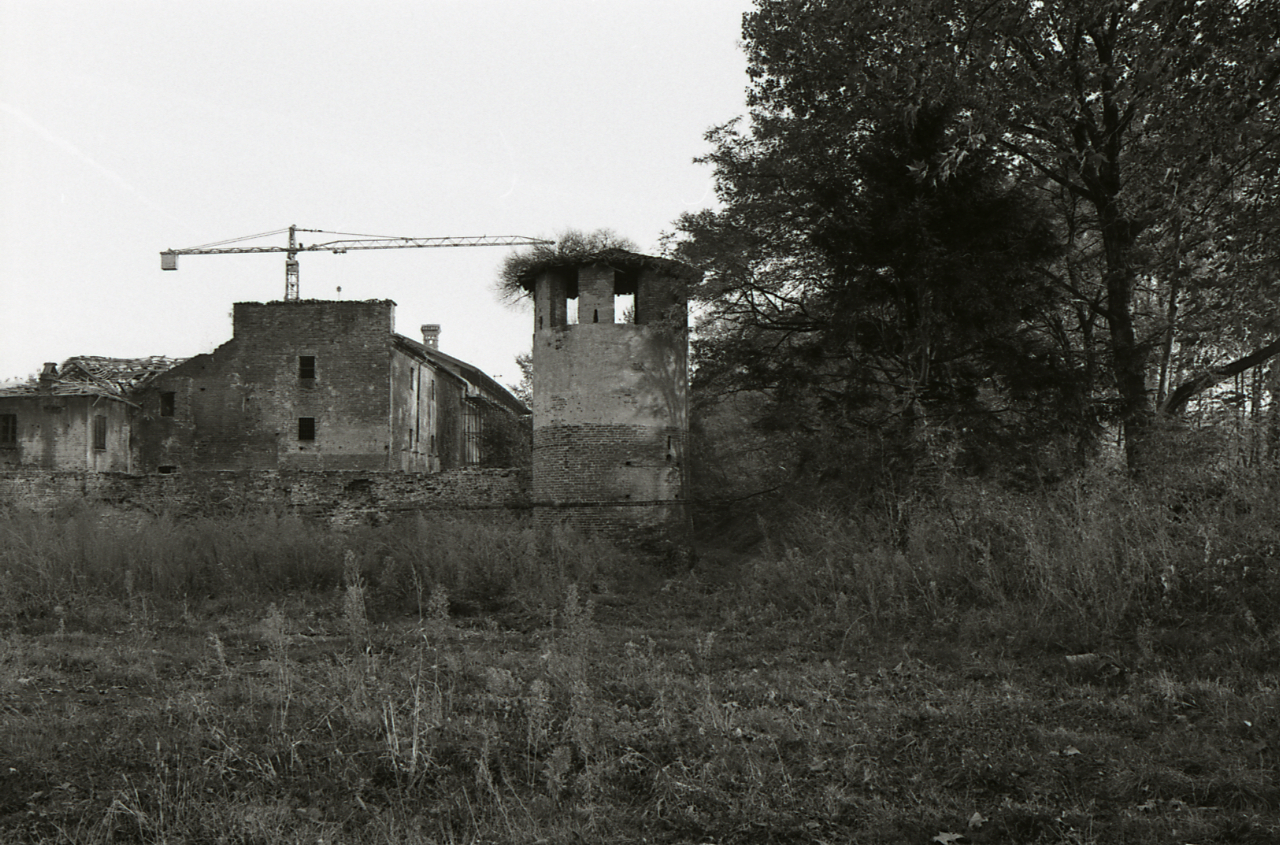
The castle before the renovations

It was probably during this period that the castle was stripped of all its artwork and fine furniture, as also witnessed by Guido Sutermeister. In this regard, Sutermeister wrote:

[...] From the time I got to know the castle, that is, from 1906, it had been practically stripped of almost everything [...]

— Guido Sutermeister, Il castello di Legnano, 1940

Sutermeister again observed that the Cornaggia family, who resided in the castle only at certain times of the year, the optimal ones to follow the agricultural activities carried out on their estate, used furnishings of their era, since the historical furniture of the fortification had long since disappeared. As late as 1940, the year Sutermeister wrote his work, a wooden bed characterized by the presence of four candelabra turrets in the Baroque style that had belonged to Oldrado III Lampugnani, and thus dated back to the 16th century, was still preserved in the room above the hall of honor. This bed was later transferred by the Cornaggia family to their noble residence in Mozzate Seprio. At that time there were also some paintings of some artistic value, such as an Ecce Homo presumably made by Guercino, which was purchased in 1939 by a well-known history and art enthusiast from Legnano. In the same years a wealthy Milanese aristocrat purchased two valuable 19th-century oval canvases representing two members of the Cornaggia family.

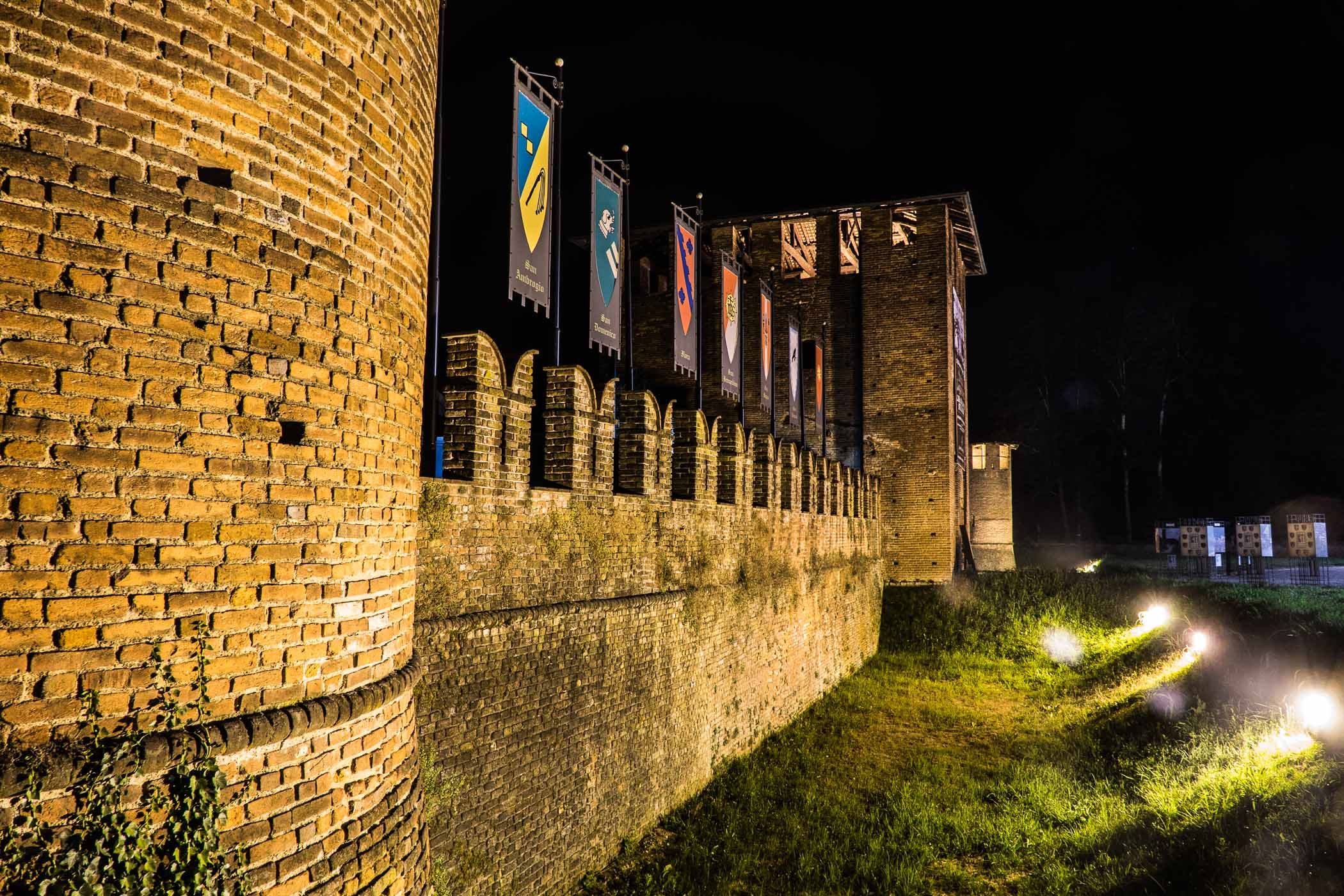
Nighttime glimpse of Legnano Castle. In the center, behind the battlements, are the coats of arms of the eight Legnano districts.

Until 1929 there was also a cabinet made in the 19th century that contained the castle's historical archives, documents dating back as far as the 17th century; it then disappeared without a trace. The castle's ancient fireplaces disappeared at an unspecified time, as even Sutermeister did not witness their presence. At the Ca' Granda in Milan there are some paintings that depicted members of the Lampugnani family and that may have once been in the castle: whether they were actually in the Legnanese fortification, the date of their transfer is unknown.

=== The purchase by the municipality of Legnano ===
After it was abandoned by the Cornaggia family, the manor of San Giorgio was no longer maintained. In addition, the new tenants, namely the sharecropper and peasants, modified the residential part of the castle by building partition walls inside the larger rooms. In 1963 the municipality of Legnano signed a preliminary contract with the Cornaggia heirs providing for the sale of the historic property. This first sale compromise was modified several times, mainly because of the future destination of the castle, the adjoining areas and the surrounding areas, which was the subject of extensive discussion. The latter, in 1976, would later be transformed into the Legnano Wood Local Park, while the castle would be used, as decided, for cultural events.

The purchase process ended in 1973, when the municipality of Legnano acquired the castle, the Cornaggia mill and 240,000 square meters of surrounding land. After decades of decay and neglect, the castle was renovated by architect Luigi Ferrario and reopened to the public in 2005. Since 2007, being part of the SALe Legnano project, it has been an exhibition venue together with the Leone da Perego palace. Inside the Visconti Castle is based the "college of captains and contrade", that is, a body that has the function of coordinating the activities, actions and intentions of the captains of the Legnano contrade, that is, the historical districts that participate annually in the Palio di Legnano.

== The architectural complex ==
=== The remains of the ancient lookout tower ===
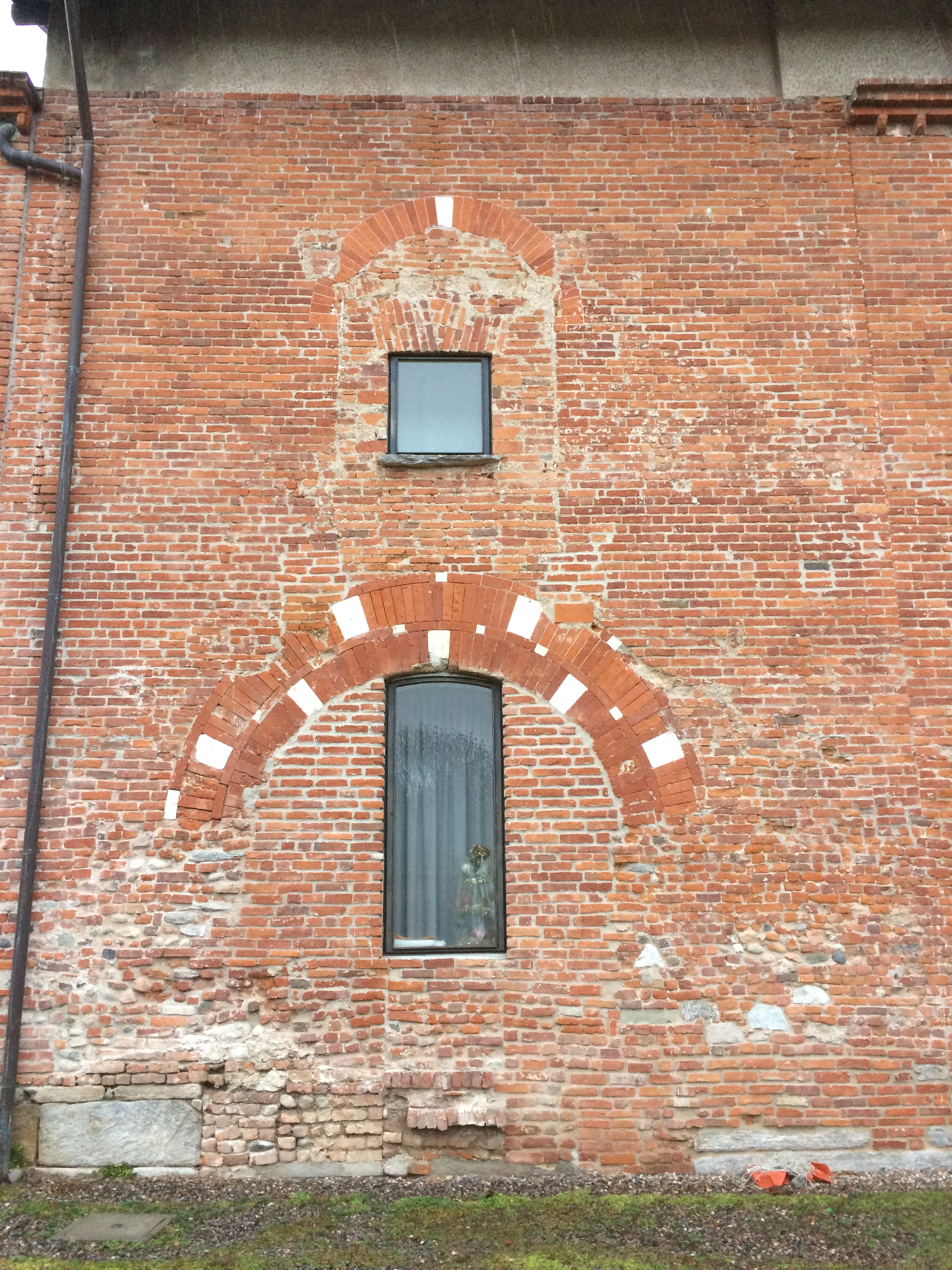
The remains of the ancient lookout tower, dating back to 1231 and later incorporated into the building

The lower part of the watchtower, which was presumably built in 1231 and belonged to the ancient convent, can still be seen in the modern structure: this building, which is the oldest part of the Legnano fortification, was in fact incorporated into the castle and corresponds to the central portion of the wing that is immediately to the right of the main keep.

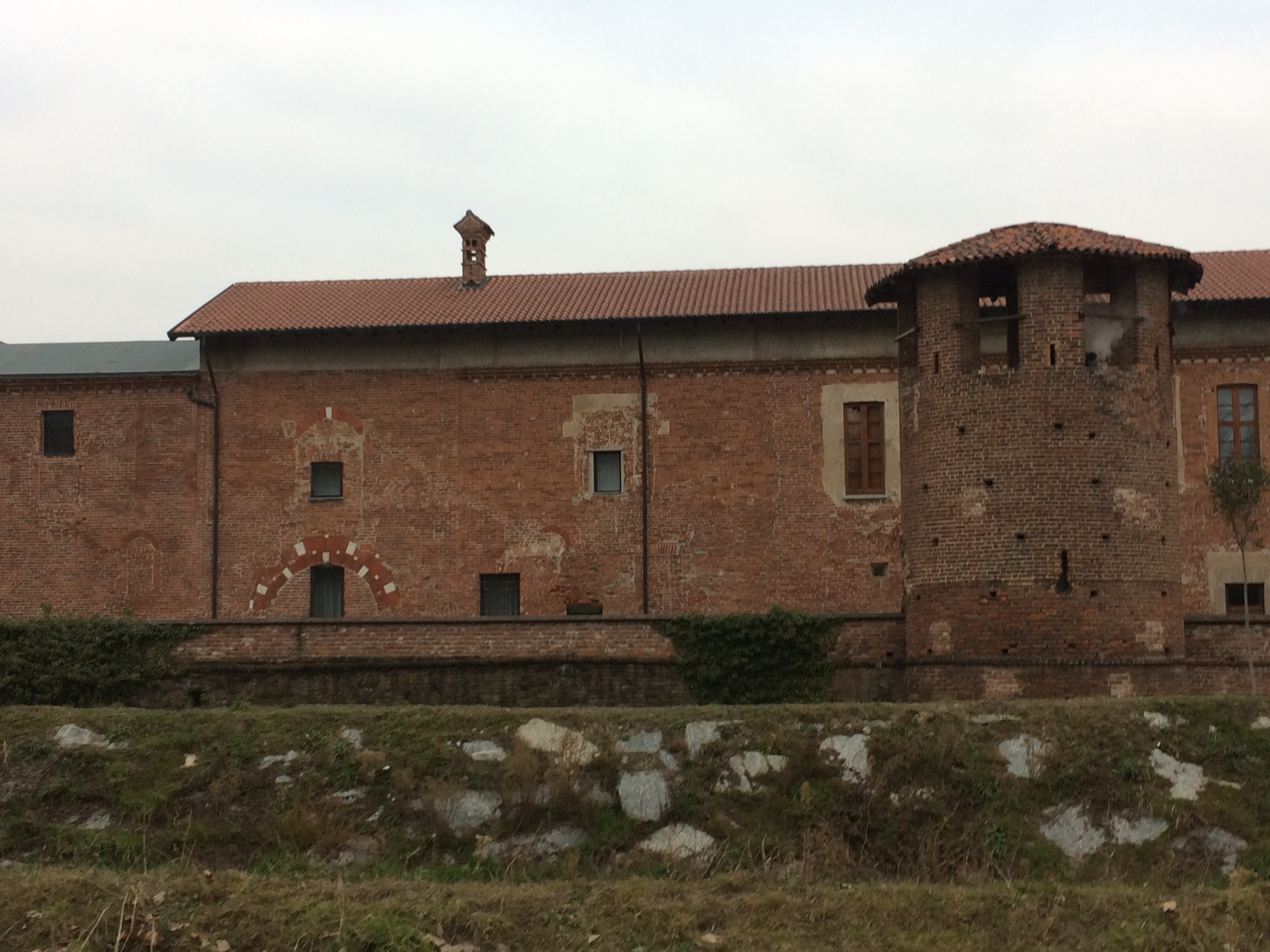
On the left, the remains of the ancient watchtower, later incorporated into the building

The remains of the tower are square in shape and possess a 7.5 m edge. The windows and doors, which were later bricked up, were single-arched windows and are still recognizable in the modern structure: the arches were made of brick ashlar and white marble. At this tower was the original entrance to the structure, which is still recognizable on the west side although it has been walled up: it features a wide brick arch embellished with white marble inserts. However, the name or family of the builder of the watchtower is uncertain. As already mentioned, according to some studies, the tower may have been built by Uberto Visconti, or by the castle's later owners, the Della Torre family.

The greater antiquity of this part of the castle is also indicated by the appearance of the outer walls, which are rougher and look different from those of the remaining part of the structure, as well as by the level of the original floors, which is 1.5 m lower than the rest of the ground floor. Work performed in the 15th century later restored all the floors to the same level. Originally, this portion of the building, when it served as a tower, was taller and had an additional floor at the top marked by defensive battlements.

As for decorations, those on the ground floor have disappeared, while on the upper floor there are frescoes from the Renaissance period. When the castle was converted into an agricultural estate, wine presses were allocated in the original watchtower: the channels dug on the stone floor that were used to transport the must remain from this use. The scaffolding holes that were used at the time to carry out the work of this conversion have also come down to the 21st century: they are rough hut-shaped niches and can be distinctly seen on the walls of this portion of the castle.

=== The buildings constructed by the Della Torre family ===
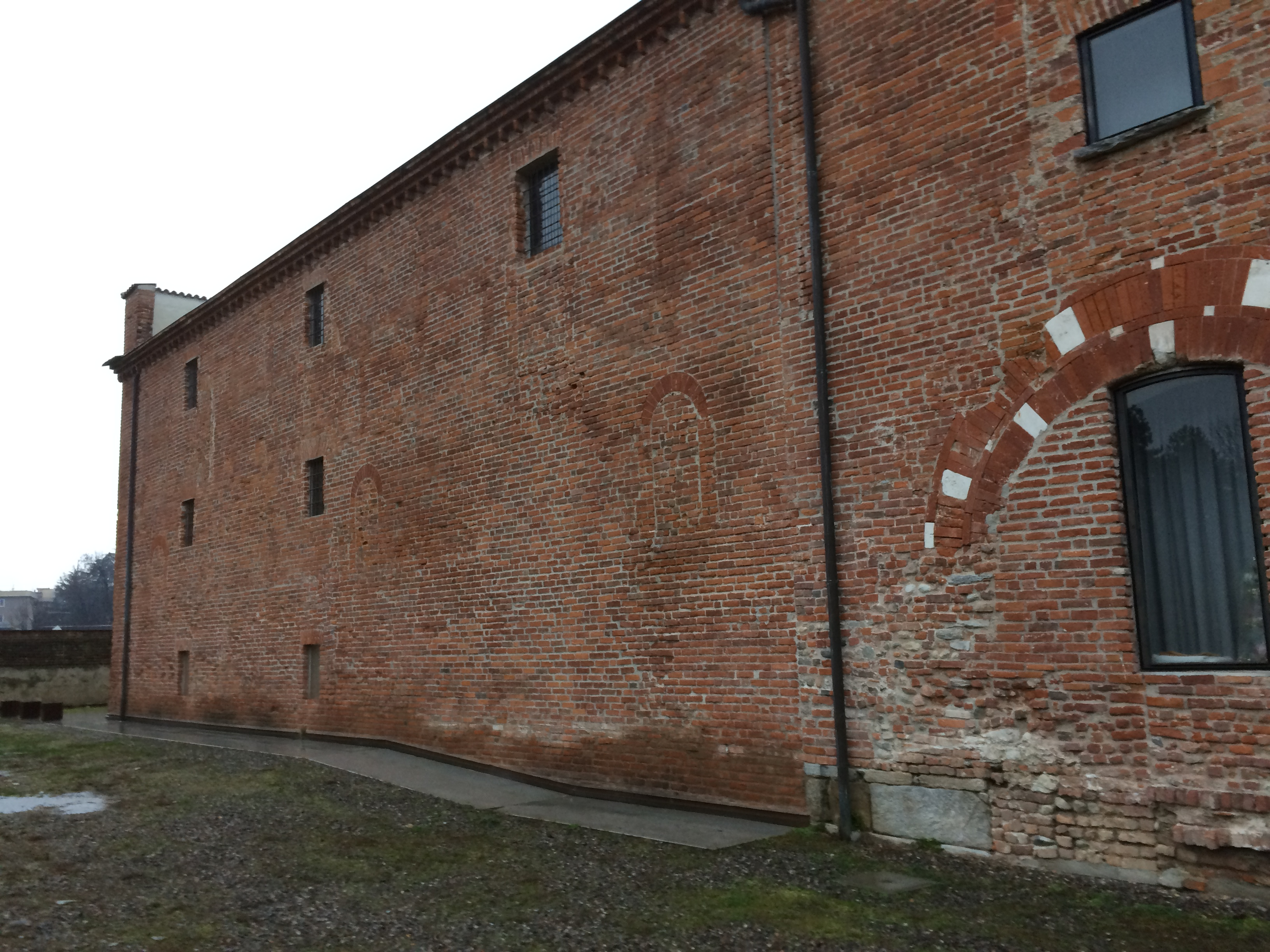
On the left is the part of the building constructed between 1261 and 1273 by the Della Torre family. It is located north of the ruins of the watchtower, toward Toselli Avenue.

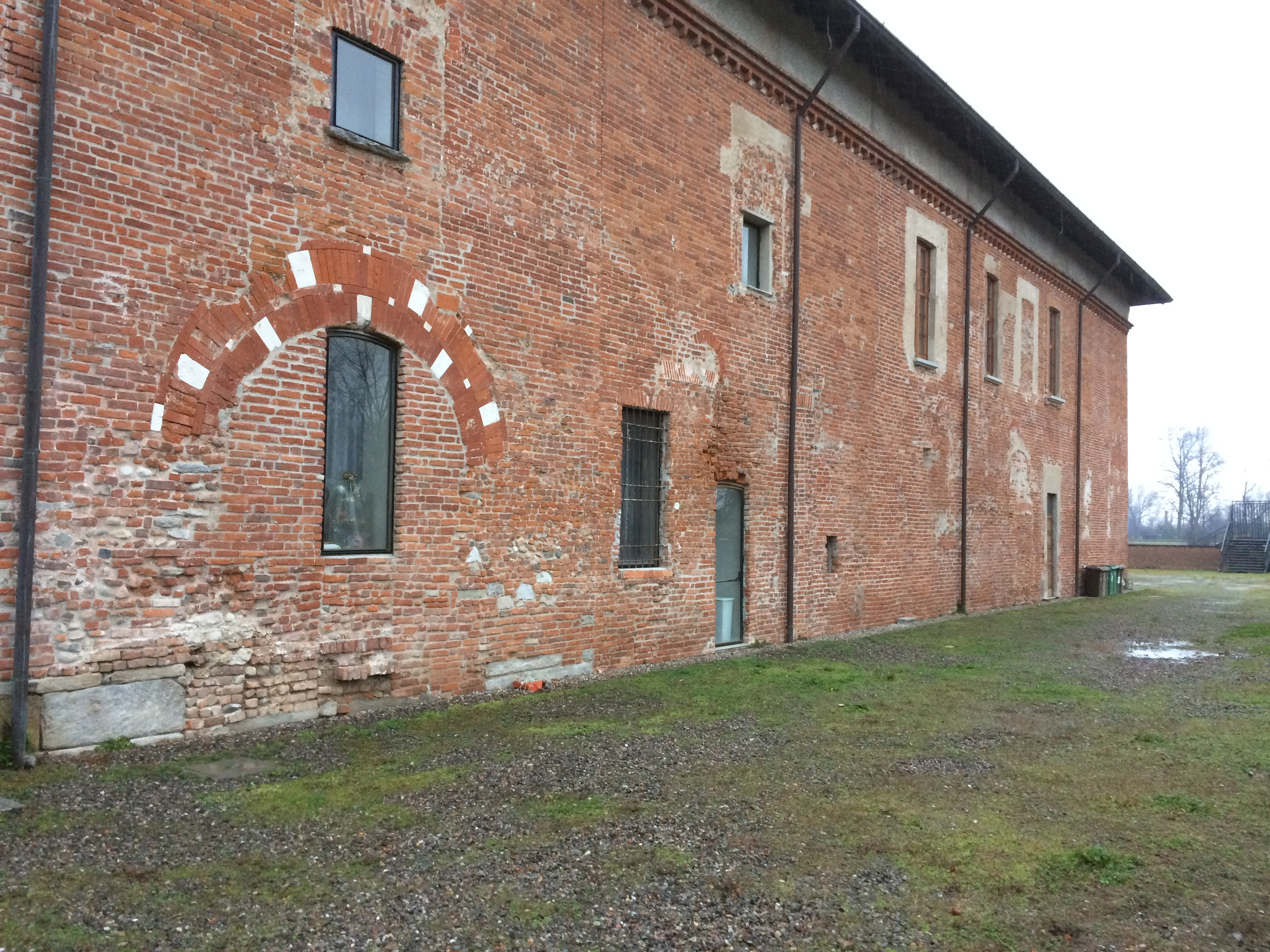
On the right, the part of the building built between 1261 and 1273 by the Della Torre family and rebuilt between 1523 and 1528 by Oldrado III Lampugnani

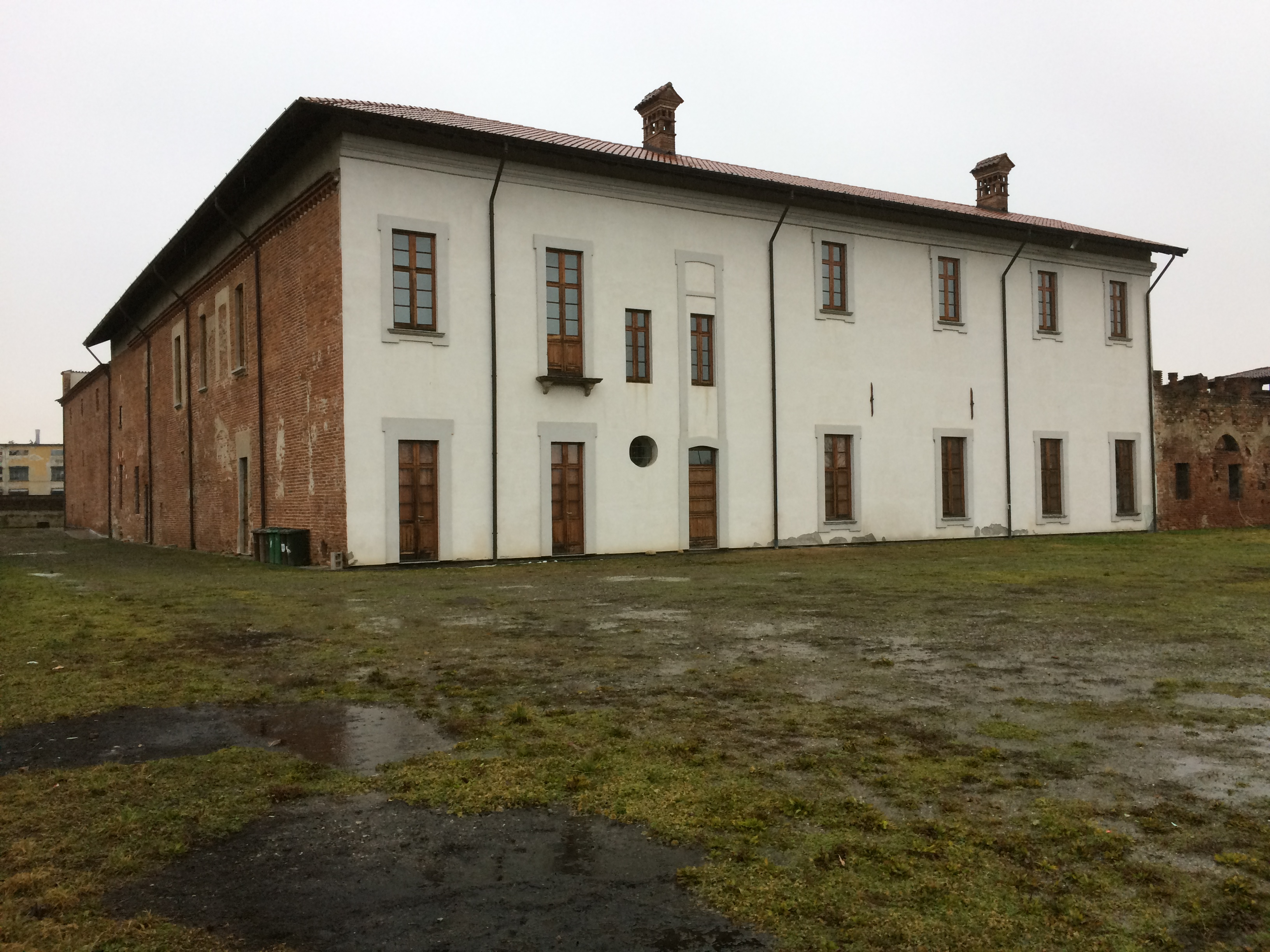
The southwest part of the castle. On the right, plastered white in Baroque style, is the wing built by Oldrado II Lampugnani in the 15th century, while on the left is, adjacent to the latter, the other part of the castle (with exposed brick walls) built between 1261 and 1273 by the Della Torre family and rebuilt between 1523 and 1528 by Oldrado III Lampugnani

After acquiring the convent and related land, the Della Torre family built two more buildings. The first one, which has dimensions of 20 m by 7.5 m and was built between 1261 and 1273, is the one located north of the ruins of the watchtower of the ancient convent: it is therefore located parallel to the Olona and towards modern Viale Toselli. Again, the original arched windows have been walled up. Also in this case, the arches were made of ashlar in terracotta and white marble: however, the remains of the ancient windows have completely disappeared due to some later restorations involving the exterior of the building and carried out by Oldrado III Lampugnani in the 16th century. Moreover, with the transformation of the castle into an agricultural estate, the original two floors were changed to three with the change of use from residence to warehouse: in particular, vats and barrels for wine production were placed in the basement, while the two upper floors were used as a warehouse for foodstuffs.

The other building, which was also originally built by the Della Torre family between 1261 and 1273, was the wing that was located south of the original tower of the old convent, also parallel to the Olona: this building was later replaced by a new complex that was rebuilt and then expanded between 1523 and 1528 by Oldrado III Lampugnani. According to other authors, this second building was later built by Oldrado II Lampugnani. A few walls remain of the old thirteenth-century building, which are still characterized by the presence of the old arched windows, which were, however, bricked up by Oldrado III Lampugnani in the sixteenth century: the latter also made the external white plaster in the Baroque style. Other remnants of the thirteenth-century construction, this time more tangible, are the part of the building immediately adjacent to the old lookout tower, which has a similar different style corresponding to that of the latter. This wing has dimensions 7.5 m by 30 m.

Continuing southward, the appearance of this building in fact changes: evidence of this change is the style of the windows, which is different. In this wing there are, on the first floor, the rooms where the Lampugnani lived, rooms that are characterized by the absence of decorations and coffered ceilings, while on the upper floor there are two bedrooms, which are frescoed with motifs representing marble inlays. These decorations were made in the 16th century by the painter Gian Giacomo Lampugnani, who also supervised, among other things, the construction of the basilica of San Magno: Lampugnani also executed the first decorations of the major church of Legnano. In the second bedroom there is a small niche that served as a closet for the owner and where a female head of unknown subject is frescoed. All the rooms in this building have fireplaces, hearths that present a rustic appearance that is a far cry from the refined and richly decorated fireplaces of the other aristocratic mansions in Legnano. This building was equipped with a hot-air heating system that consisted of terracotta pipes, grills, and hearths, and was used to heat the entire south wing of the castle.

=== The small church of St. George ===
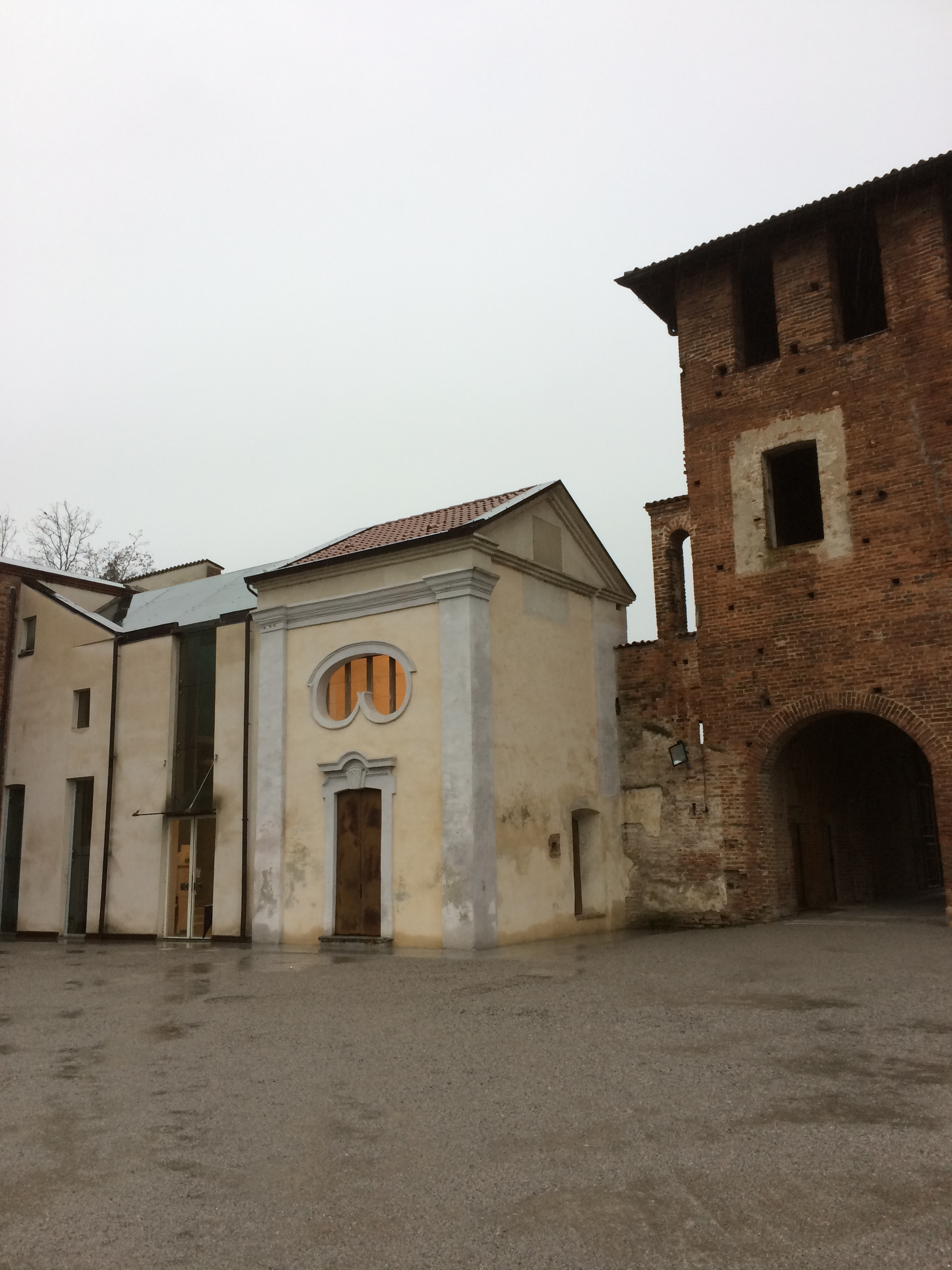
On the left, next to the main keep, the small church of St. George, which dates back to 1440

Within the perimeter of the castle there is still a small church dedicated to St. George, which was built in 1440 probably on the remains of the temple belonging to the former convent of Augustinians. This hypothesis is based on a common custom in vogue for centuries: to give buildings of similar use that followed one another in the same place the same name or, in the presence of religious buildings, to dedicate the structure to the same saint. The original small church may have always been inside the convent of the Augustinians, or it may have been built by the Della Torre. Other conjecture considers the hypothesis that the original small church was opened for worship by Ottone Visconti, who lived in the castle and may have needed a church to officiate religious services, being a priest. As shown in the aforementioned notarial deed dated October 14, 1261, the one concerning the abandonment of the convent by the Augustinian monks, the primigenial small church of St. George certainly existed for at least thirty years: it was therefore built before 1231.

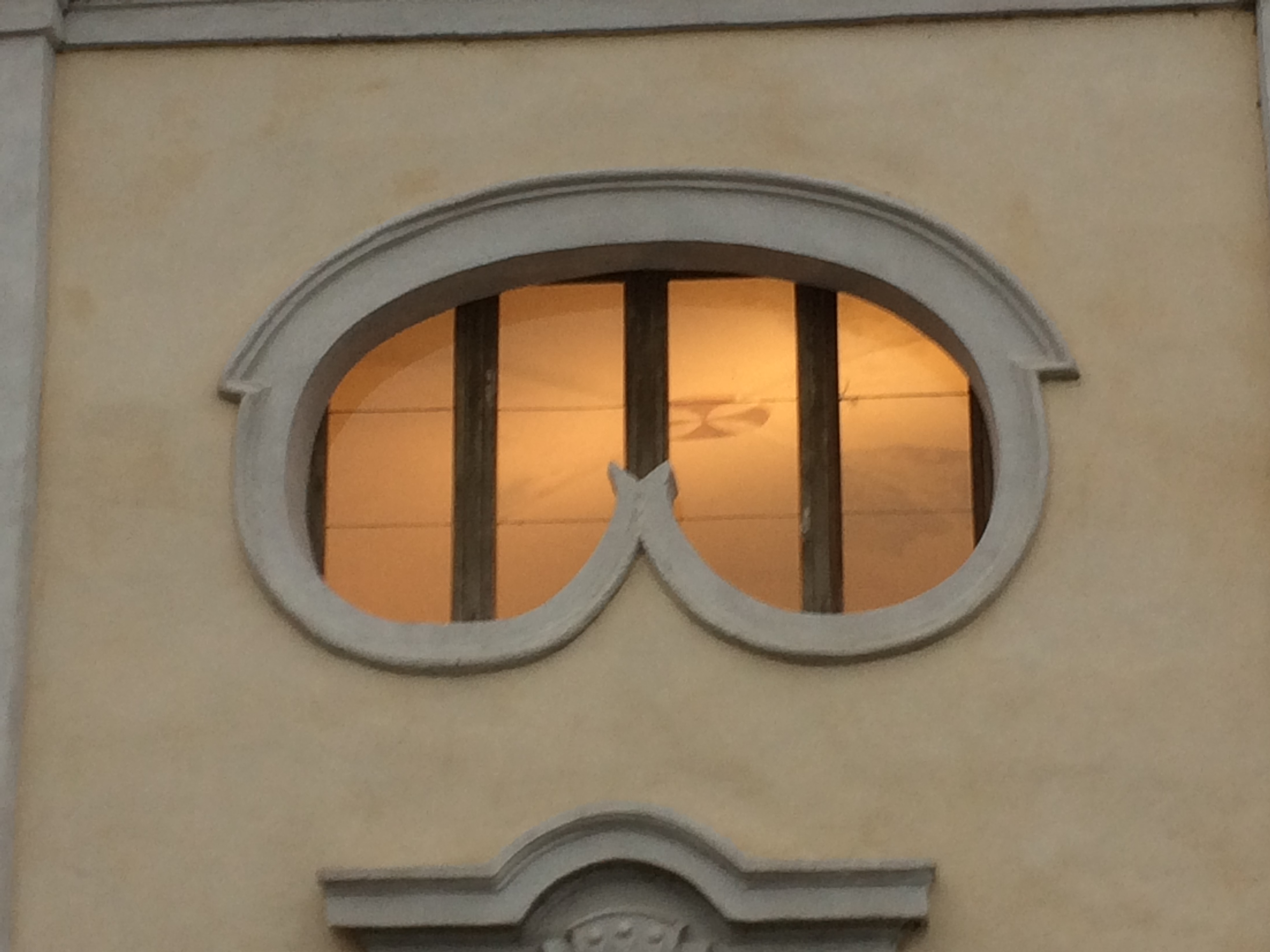
Detail of the small church of St. George

Other documents where the modern church is mentioned are dated 1580, 1640, 1686, 1779 and 1845, although the house of worship is mentioned under different titles. The document of 1580, which in turn recalls a writing of 1262, gives the name "oratories of St. Maiolus," while the written record of 1640, which was compiled by Agostino Pozzo, provost of San Magno from 1628 to 1653, calls the sacred building by the name "private oratory of San Giorgio." On the documents of 1686 and 1779 the name is reiterated in "church of St. George," while the written testimony of 1845 shows the dedication to St. Angelo. Over the centuries all possible references, for example on frescoes, that might have mentioned the dedication of this place of worship have since disappeared. However, the dedication of the little church to St. George is reiterated by Guido Sutermeister in one of his writings:

[...] Why St George's Castle? A small church with an unknown convent gave it its name. [...]

— Guido Sutermeister, Notizie Archeologiche Zona Legnanese. Notizie storiche Castello di Legnano. Tutela paesaggio., 1956

The Legnano fortification was commonly called "Castle of San Giorgio" (lat. Castrum Sancti Georgi) especially in documents dating back to the 14th, 15th and 16th centuries, then the name "Legnano Castle" began to prevail. At one time the little church of St. George also included a room located to the right of the main keep that was frescoed with floral subjects and became the castle's entrance guardhouse. The small church was later renovated in the 19th century by the Cornaggia marquises, who redid the vault and facade.

This religious building was used both as a private place of worship and as a family tomb. As for works of art, the little church is devoid of wall decorations except for tomb inscriptions. There is only a painting depicting St. George that can be dated to the early part of the 19th century.

=== The extensions of the Lampugnani ===
==== The main keep ====
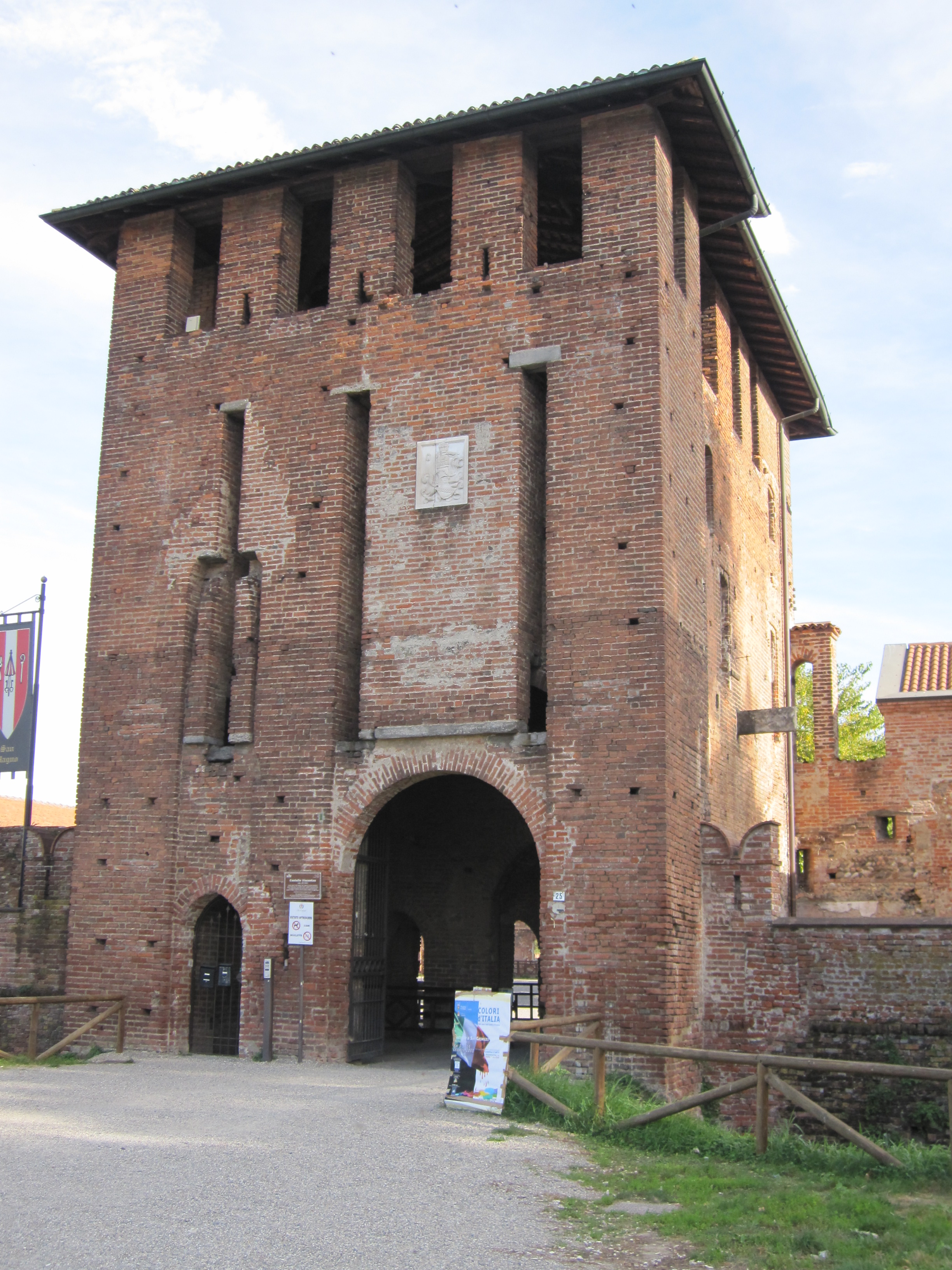
The main keep, which was built between 1437 and 1445, pictured from the square in front of the castle

The main keep was built between 1437 and 1445 by Oldrado II Lampugnani. This defensive structure, which is set toward the north, has a rectangular base (9.2 by 14 m) and is 16.5 m high from street level. This tower, which was the most important defensive part of the castle, includes the main entrance to the structure: with its construction, the entrance moved from the west, that is, from the original lookout tower, to the north. In the main keep, there are two rooms on the upper floors that were once used to house the guard and the captain of arms: they were ascended by an external wooden staircase that was supported by serizzo corbels. Later this staircase was eliminated and was replaced by a similar interior masonry structure that is located on the right just past the entrance. There is also an attic at the top.

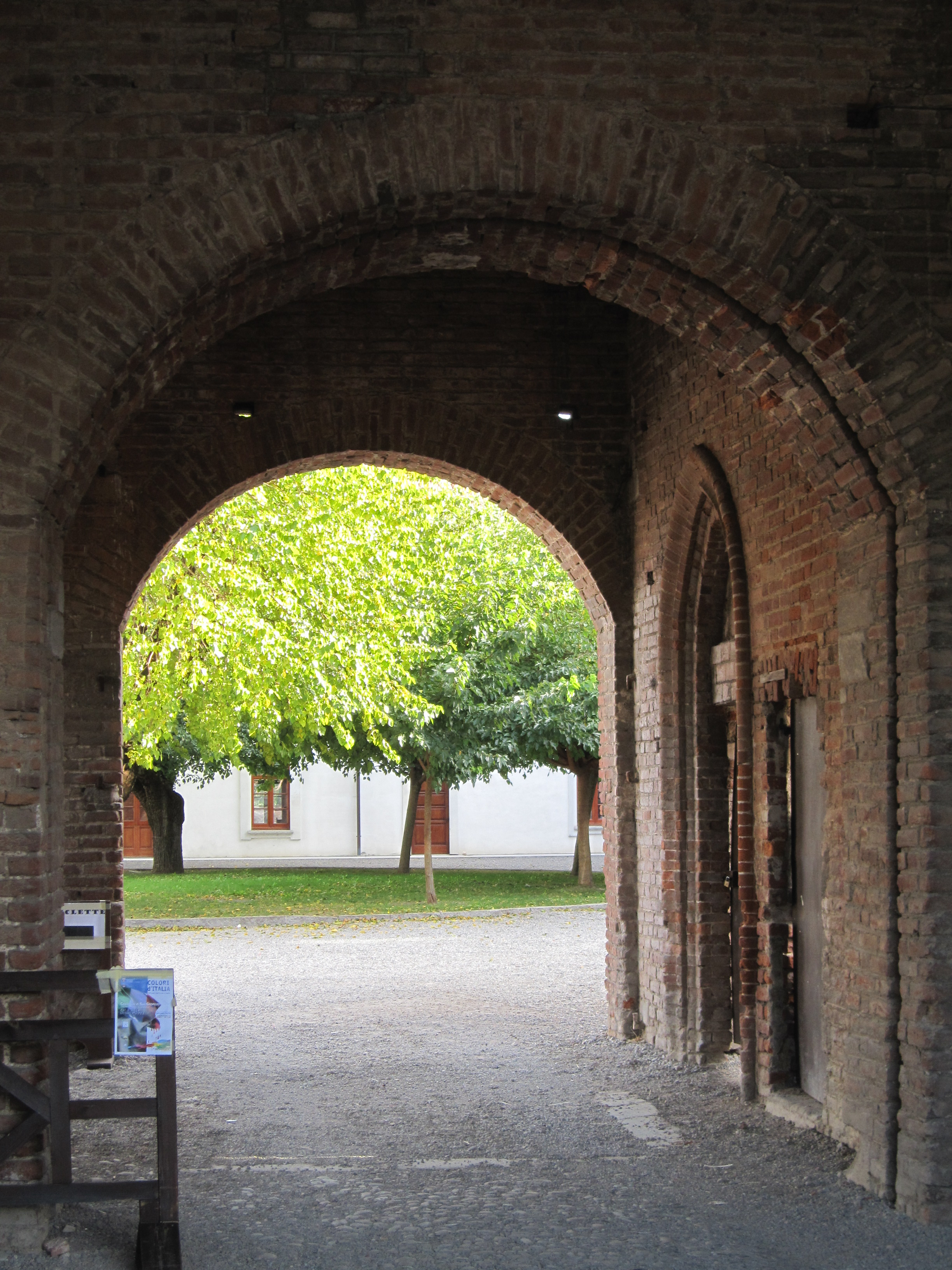
The entrance to the castle, which is located at the main keep

On this building, above the entrance, there is a coat of arms made of Candoglia marble, measuring 1 by 1.2 meters, rather elaborate, of the Lampugnani family: above this coat of arms there is an armet, which emphasizes the military quality of Oldrado II; there is then placed a basket containing a lamb, a symbol of his meekness, which has a bridle in its mouth, which is used to tame spirited horses and is a symbol of the cavalry command. The coat of arms is completed by his initials, a pine cone and some pine branches, the meaning of which is unknown, and a Maltese cross, which is on the neck of the crest and has been credited to Oldrado II for the role the noble Lampugnani played in some negotiations between the Duke of Milan and the King of Cyprus. On the facade of the main tower there were some frescoes, of which only a few traces remain, that may have depicted Saint George or a noble coat of arms.

As already mentioned, Oldrado II Lampugnani also dug a moat around the structure, which was floodable by a system of locks installed on the banks of the Olona River, and built a drawbridge in front of the main entrance. The moat, in particular, was effective even in winter: when the surface of the water froze, it was simply necessary to open the lock and empty it into the basin so that the ice fell on the steep walls of the moat.

In addition to the drawbridge, there was once a barricade at the main entrance that could be lowered to prevent the entrance of attackers, assailants who could be subdued by the blows delivered by soldiers stationed in the upper floors of the keep. This garrison could also defend the entrance to the castle by means of some trap doors that could be opened above the attackers, as well as by the loopholes and wooden walkways located in the courtyard facing the keep.

Both the grating and the drawbridge, including the mechanisms, were removed during the period when the castle was used as a farm by the Cornaggia family. Until the 20th century on the first floor of the main keep was a bridge scale that was used to weigh farm wagons.

==== The walls and courtyard ====
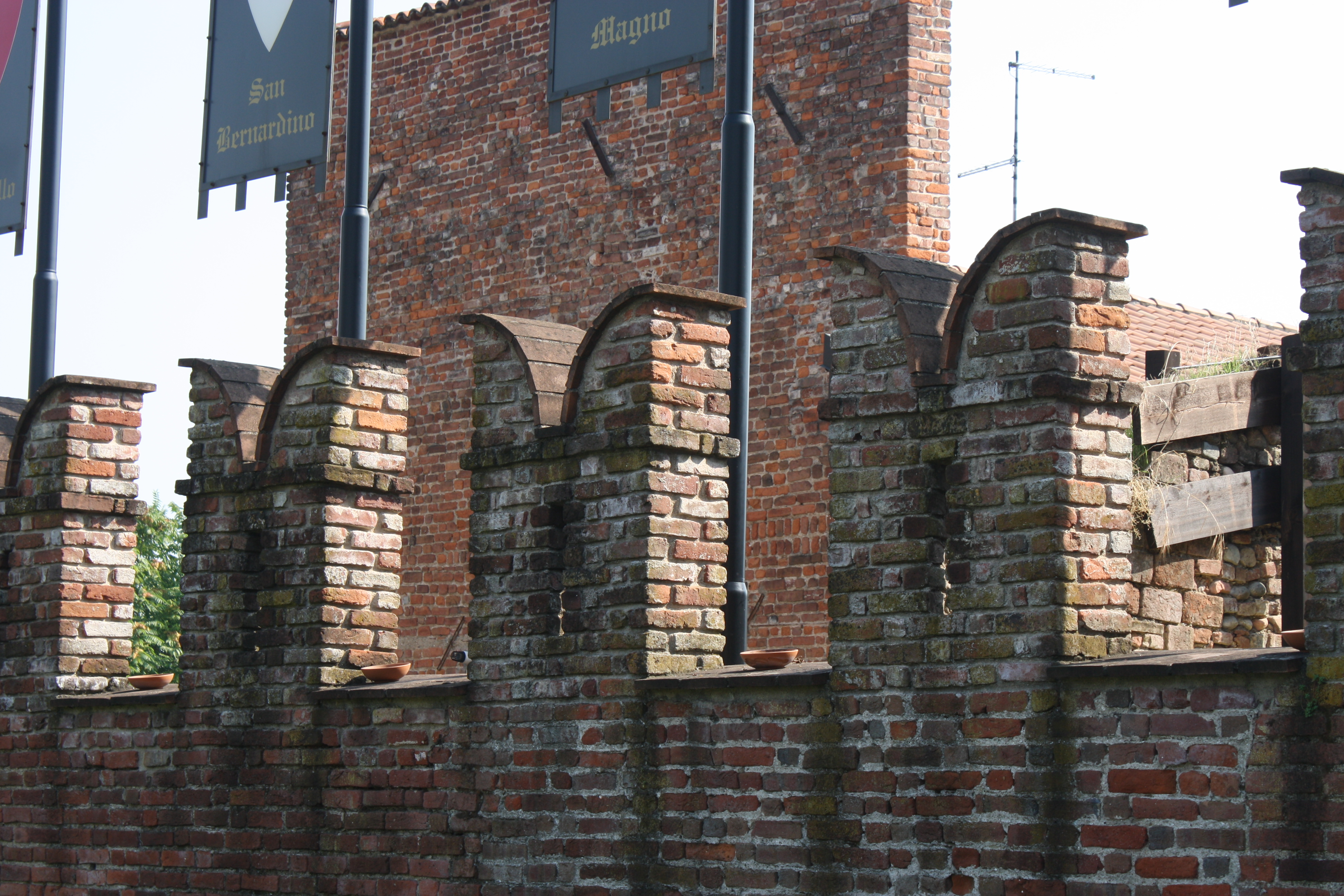
The battlements of the defensive walls to the north of the complex, which were built in the 15th century by Oldrado II Lampugnani

Oldrado II Lampugnani also built the sturdy walls enclosing the structure, which are between one and two meters thick and 5.2 meters high from the bottom of the moat. They once had a perimeter of 80 m by 120 m, while today they outline a rectangle of 80 m by 70 m.

The walls, in the time of Oldrado II, were bordered by an inner wooden walkway connecting the six minor towers. Originally there was also another wooden overhead walkway that directly connected the walkway around the walls with the rooms located on the second floor in the part of the building that corresponds to the old lookout tower. This walkway was removed in the 16th century by Oldrado III Lampugnani.

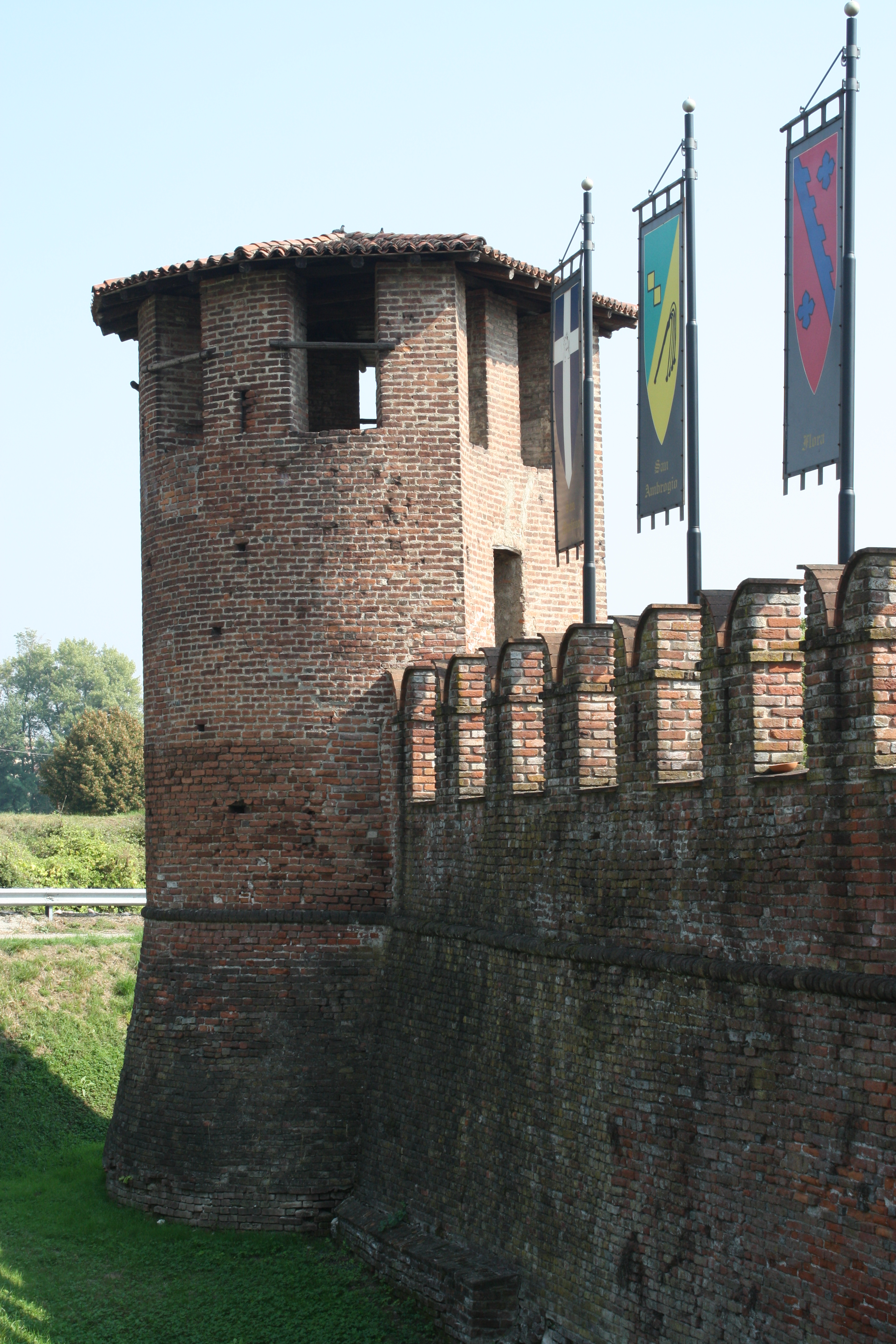
One of the defensive towers, which were built in the 15th century by Oldrado II Lampugnani

On this occasion Oldrado III Lampugnani also changed the appearance of the inner courtyard, having panels made on the outer facades of the south wing of the castle that contained depictions of weapons and rural scenes, which have been almost completely lost apart from a few traces of paintings that have weathered.

Oldrado III also made the exterior cornices, which feature exquisitely crafted joists and corbels, and the chimney pots, which are also of a refined style. In the 17th century, on the other hand, the railings of the balcony windows were put in place.

==== The secondary towers ====
Six cylindrical towers with a flared base were inserted along the walls, which are provided with battlements and a roof, a covering that served to protect soldiers from the bad weather. Four towers were positioned at the corners of the quadrilateral, while two were placed in the middle of the east and west sides: they are all slightly asymmetrical, with the slightly flattened side facing the interior of the castle. Later the two towers placed towards the south were demolished: they were probably demolished by the Cornaggia marquises, since they still existed in the 17th century, as reported in the writings of the provost of San Magno Agostino Pozzo. No material traces of these two towers have reached the 21st century, so they were demolished down to the foundations.

The towers are 12.5 m high and have a diameter of 5.5 m: they have embrasures at the height of the wooden chemin de ronde, while there are battlements under their roofs: both embrasures and battlements had the function of stopping enemies who tried to climb over the walls by means of the shots fired by the soldiers who manned the towers protected behind these defensive systems. The shape of the walls and that of the towers recalls those built at the Castello Sforzesco in Milan between 1450 and 1466, from which Oldrado II Lampugnani drew inspiration, albeit with the difference in the material used: instead of the more expensive stone, the cheaper brick was opted for fortification in Legnano.

The right towers, on the other hand, are frescoed, as already mentioned, with floral festoon motifs that are supported by rings: however, only traces of these works remain. The study of these traces of painting has led to determine the time of their creation: since they were made in the Empire style, they were probably painted at the behest of Carlo Cornaggia, who purchased the castle in 1798. Presumably the Cornaggia also wanted to decorate other parts of the castle in the Empire style, since in 1925 Guido Sutermeister found piled up, inside the tower located to the northwest, terracotta decorations and moldings of the same style as the ornaments added in the mid-19th century to various buildings in the fortress by the Cornaggia family itself.

==== The building to the south of the complex ====
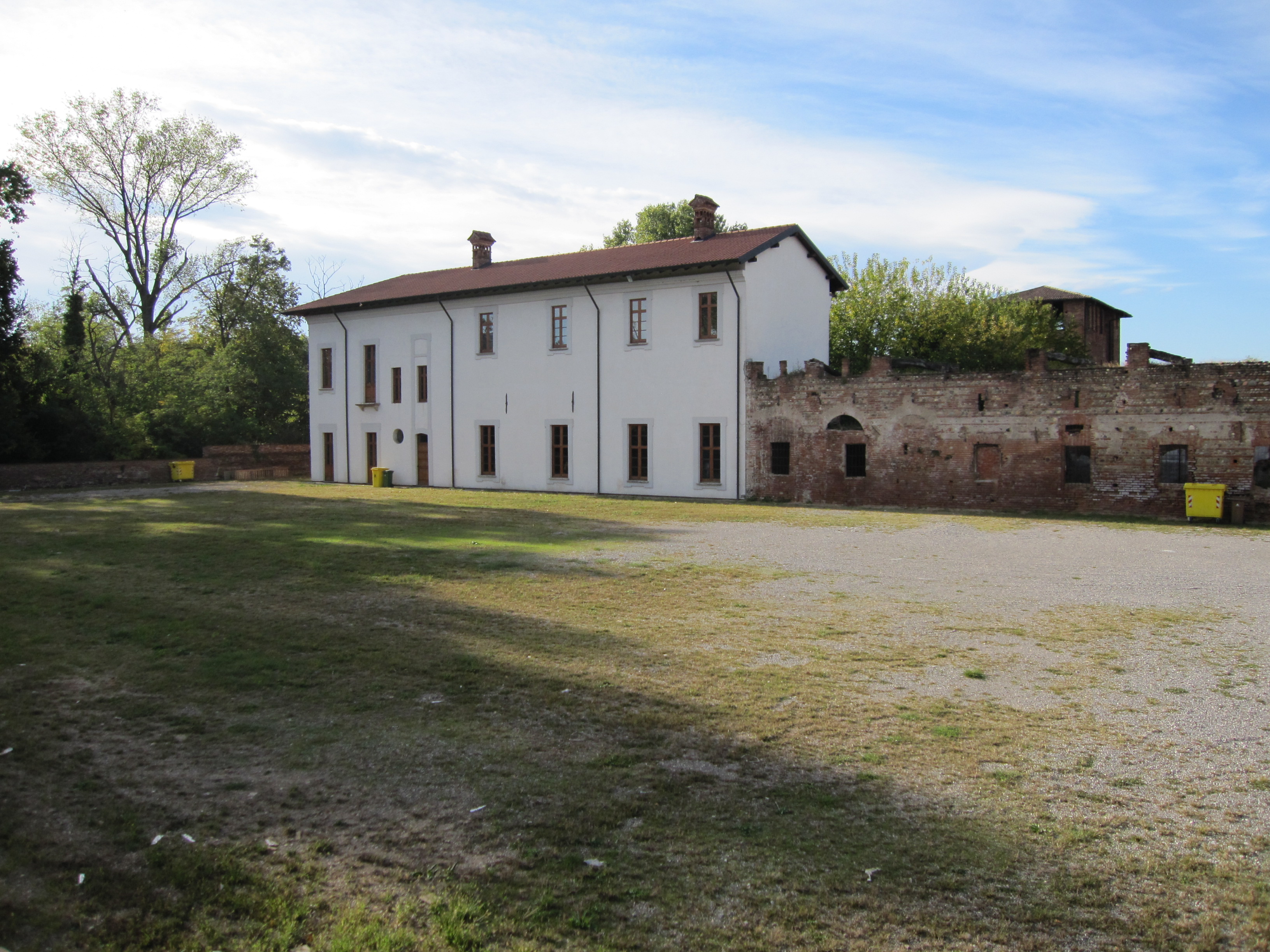
The building to the south of the complex, distinguished by white plaster in the Baroque style, which is parallel to the southern walls and was built by Oldrado II Lampugnani in the 15th century. On the right, part of the barns and stables built by the Cornaggia marquises in the 20th century

South of the Della Torre wing - parallel to the southern walls - is another two-story building built by Oldrado II Lampugnani and later plastered white in the Baroque style by Oldrado III in the 16th century. On the ground floor of this building was a large room that had dimensions 15 m by 8 m and possessed a barrel-vaulted ceiling embellished with crossings and pendentives. To the east of this hall is a fireplace behind which is a small study inside which was found the heating plant of the hot-air heating system that served, as mentioned, the entire south wing of the castle, including this building. Access to this small room is outside the building. Considering the size and architecture of the ceiling, the large room on the ground floor probably served as a reception hall.

On the upper floor, on the other hand, there are three rooms with coffered oak ceilings, the tiles of which were decorated with motifs representing leaves and flowers. With the construction of this building, which has a length of 24 meters, the residential area was considerably enlarged: in this way, the castle took on the characteristics of a fortified stately home equipped with large spaces and halls useful for the purpose.

=== The extensions of the Cornaggia ===
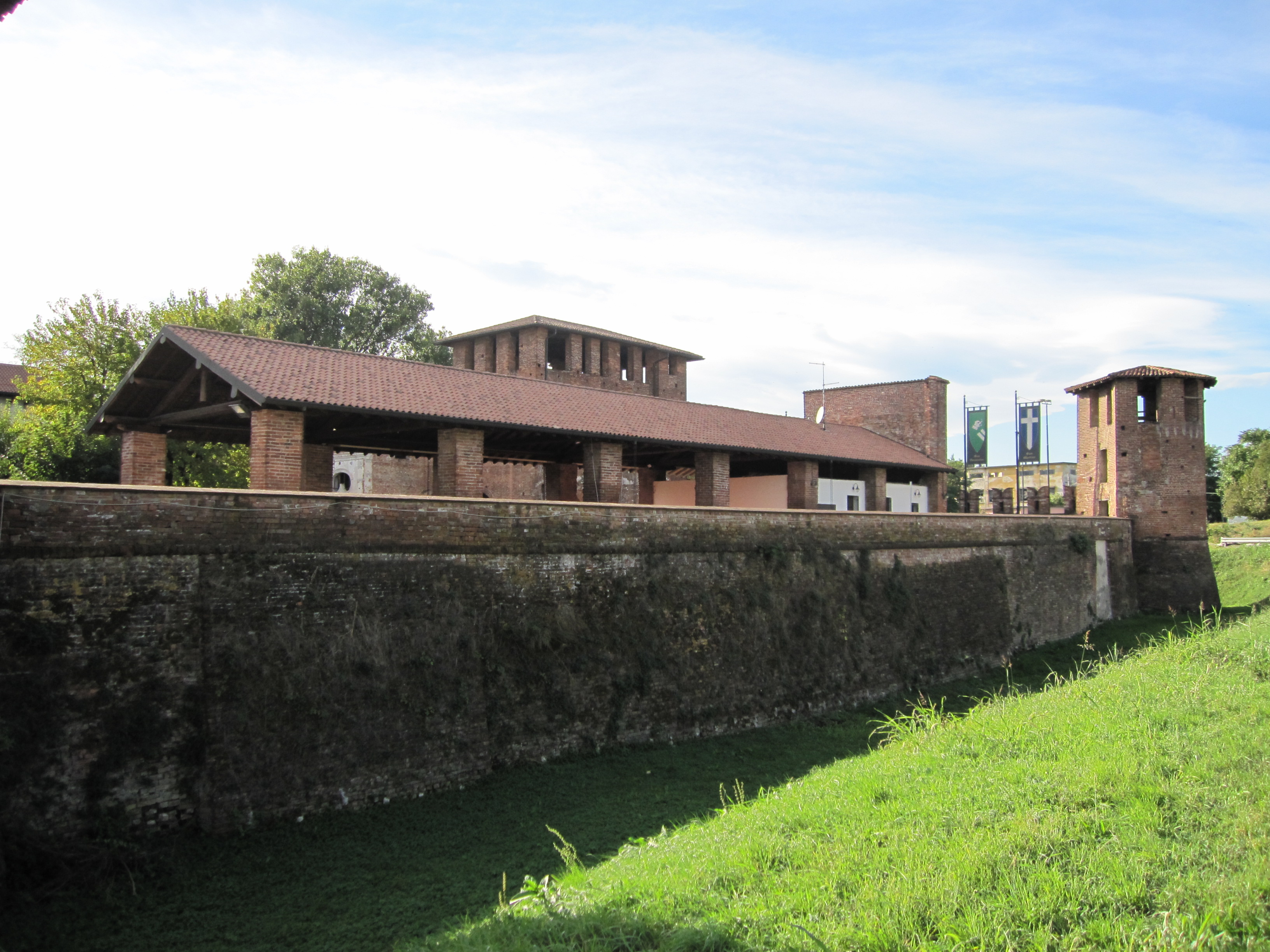
The east side of the structure. Behind the walls and the remains of the flooded moat, other stables built in the 19th century can be glimpsed, this time to the left of the main keep, after the transformation of the structure into an agricultural estate

Next to the building constructed by Oldrado II Lampugnani are part of the barns and stables built by the Cornaggia marquises in the 20th century. The Cornaggia family then added a clearing to the south of the structure that was originally intended as an indoor garden, removed the battlements from the walls (except for a short section), and demolished the towers to the south of the complex.

In the same century, more stables and barns were built, this time on the far left of the main keep, which feature brickwork and ogival arches. This construction was built above the so-called "caneva," i.e., the icehouse serving the castle: this underground room, which is 8 meters below the level of the walls and was made entirely of brick, is characterized by a small entrance door protected by a grille that is located in these stables and that leads to the inner courtyard. Both buildings later used as stables and barns were made with the building material obtained from the demolition of the southern towers and battlements of the walls.

=== The network of underground passages ===
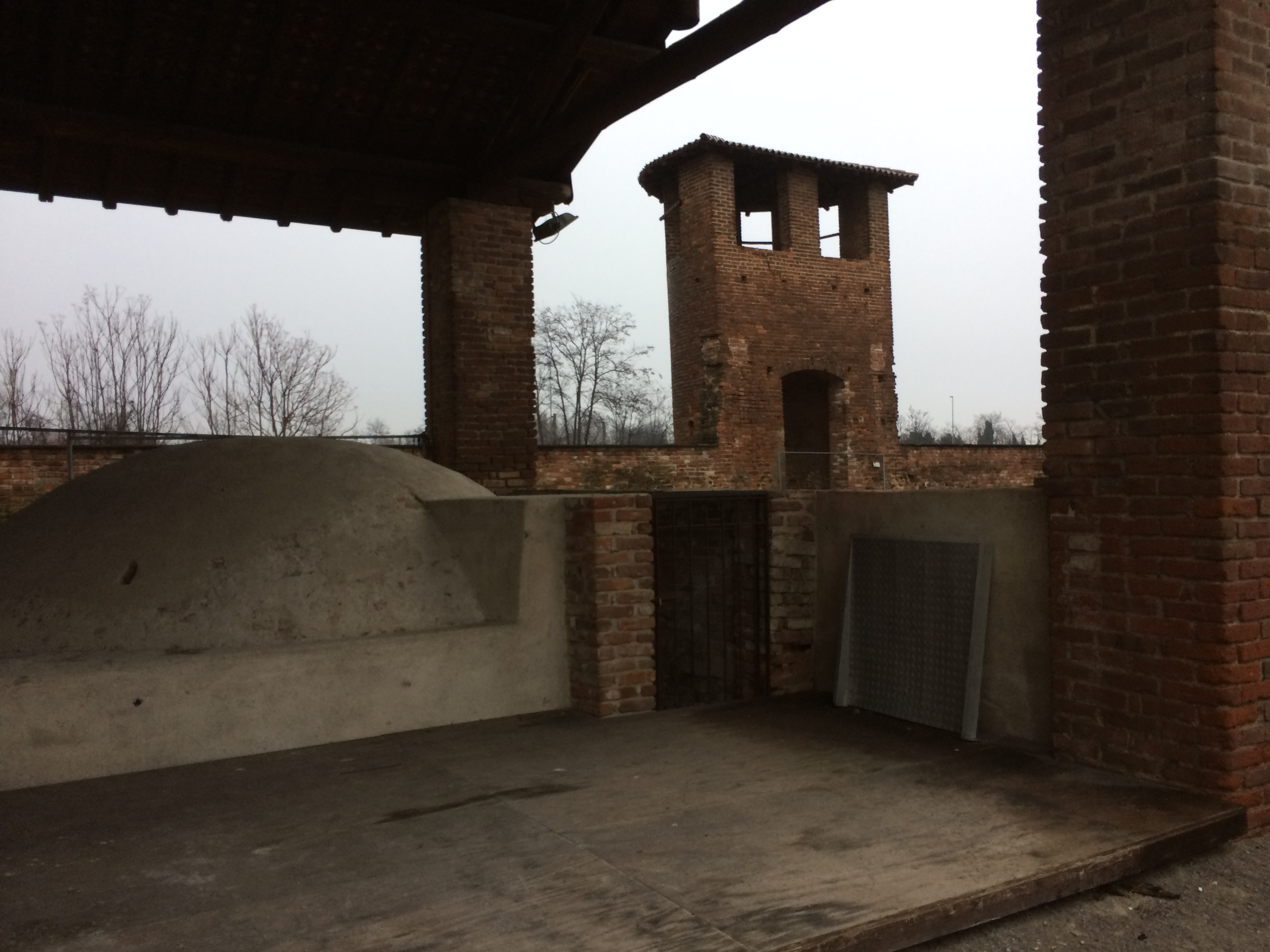
The entrance to the caneva of Legnano Castle, which is recognizable by a small grating. The building that houses it is the stable located to the left of the main keep

Surrounding Legnano Castle was a network of underground tunnels whose function was to connect the estates of the owners of the fortification and the properties of the families related to them. These tunnels made possible an eventual escape from the castle or also allowed the inhabitants of the surrounding areas to take refuge in the manor. Such tunnels were mainly used in the 14th and 15th centuries.

One of the entrances to the tunnels is located inside the ancient caneva: this entrance, which was walled up when this room was used as an icehouse, was discovered in 1935 by Guido Sutermeister. The tunnel beginning at this entrance connected Legnano Castle with San Vittore Olona. In this locality, a similar small doorway was found in the basement of a 15th-century mansion house located in modern Magenta Street, leading to a section of a tunnel going in the direction of the Legnano Castle: however, the tunnel is interrupted due to a landslide.

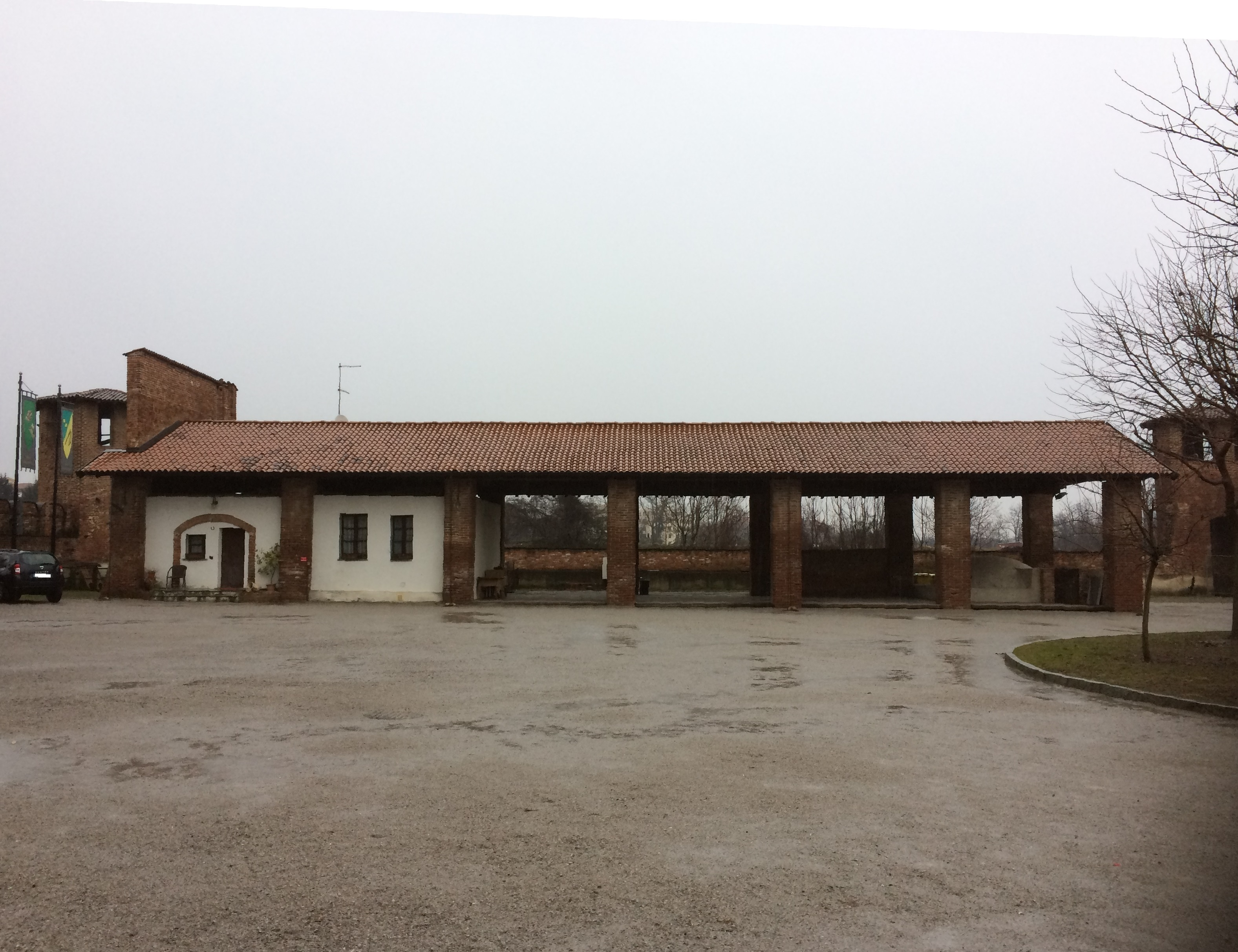
The stables located to the left of the main keep.

In the 20th century, during several excavations, other sections of these tunnels a few meters long were found. A first section, not far from San Giorgio su Legnano, was partially explored by one of the workers who unearthed it. This worker was discouraged from exploring after walking 5 or 6 meters because of a strong wind that blew out his candle. Another section towards Legnano was discovered and immediately obstructed by the city administration for safety reasons. A further section of tunnel was instead discovered, this time in the town of San Giorgio su Legnano, in the basement of the so-called "Queen's House," which is located on Via Gerli and is perhaps the oldest dwelling in the municipality. Similar remains of tunnels have also been found elsewhere.

According to a legend, from one of these tunnels Emperor Frederick Barbarossa managed to escape and save himself after the defeat he suffered in the Battle of Legnano. However, the Visconti Castle of Legnano was built by enlarging and fortifying the ancient convent of Augustinians only after the famous armed clash of May 29, 1176: in fact, the military outpost used by the Lombard League during the Battle of Legnano was the Cotta Castle, an early medieval fortification present in Legnano from the 10th to the 13th/14th centuries on the area where the modern Palazzo Leone da Perego and Galleria INA stand.

== Events ==
The Visconti Castle in Legnano is the site of a festival that takes place towards the end of June and is called "Castello in festa". It has in its program performances, exhibitions, culinary and musical events, cultural initiatives and historical reenactments that are set in the Middle Ages. The festival closes with a fireworks display. Since 2017, the island where Legnano's Visconti Castle stands has hosted Rugby Sound, a summer music event of national appeal.

== See also ==
- Della Torre
- Ottone Visconti
- History of Legnano
- Visconti of Milan

== Bibliography ==
- AA.VV (1991). Il Castello di Legnano. Fascino e suggestione di una testimonianza storica. Ed. Museo civico Sutermeister.
- Autori vari (2015). Il Palio di Legnano : Sagra del Carroccio e Palio delle Contrade nella storia e nella vita della città. Banca di Legnano.
- Agnoletto, Attilio (1992). San Giorgio su Legnano - storia, società, ambiente.
- D'Ilario, Giorgio; Egidio Gianazza, Augusto Marinoni, Marco Turri (1984). Profilo storico della città di Legnano. Edizioni Landoni.
- Ferrarini, Gabriella; Marco Stadiotti (2001). Legnano. Una città, la sua storia, la sua anima. Telesio editore.
- Percivaldi, Elena (2009). I Lombardi che fecero l'impresa. La Lega Lombarda e il Barbarossa tra storia e leggenda. Ancora Editrice.
- Raimondi, Giovanni Battista (1913). Legnano: il suo sviluppo, i suoi monumenti, le sue industrie. Pianezza e Ferrari.
- Guido Sutermeister (1940). Il castello di Legnano - Memorie n°8. Tipografica Legnanese.
- Carlo Perogalli; Enzo Pifferi; Angelo Contino. Castelli in Lombardia. Como: Editrice E.P.I.
