= WeBank =

WeBank may refer to:

- WeBank (China), a Chinese private online bank launched by Tencent
- WeBank (Italy), a commercial bank in Milan, Italy
