= Massaroni =

Massaroni is an Italian surname from Lazio, originally borne by families of metayers or sharecroppers. Notable people with the surname include:

- Candy Massaroni (born 1980), American politician
- Filippo Massaroni (born 1945), Italian bodybuilder

== See also ==
- Massaro
- Massarone
- Masseroni
- Massironi
