= Masseroni =

Masseroni is an Italian surname from Cremona, originally borne by families of metayers or sharecroppers. Notable people with the surname include:

- Carlo Masseroni (1891–1957), Italian entrepreneur
- Daniela Masseroni (born 1985), Italian rhythmic gymnast
- Enrico Masseroni (1939–2019), Italian Roman Catholic archbishop

== See also ==
- Massaroni
- Massironi
- Masseron
