= Massironi =

Massironi is an Italian surname from Lombardy, originally borne by families of metayers or sharecroppers. Notable people with the surname include:

- Cinzia Massironi (born 1966), Italian voice actress
- Marina Massironi (born 1963), Italian stage and film actress, voice actress and comedian
- Mauro Massironi (born 1979), Italian racing driver

== See also ==
- 11440 Massironi, a main-belt asteroid
- Massaroni
- Masseroni
- Masseron
