= Massaro =

Massaro is a surname. Notable people with the surname include:

- Antonio del Massaro, nicknamed il Pastura (1450–1516), Italian painter
- Ashley Massaro (1979–2019), American wrestler, valet and general manager
- Bentinho Massaro (born 1988), Dutch spiritual leader
- Daniele Massaro (born 1961), Italian football player
- Davide Massaro (born 1998) Italian football player
- Domingo Massaro (1927–2025), Chilean football player and referee
- Dominic W. Massaro, Professor of Psychology and Computer Engineering at the University of California, Santa Cruz
- Francesco Massaro (born 1935), Italian director and screenwriter
- John Massaro (conductor) (born 1957), music director for Blues in the Night with BTT
- John Massaro (guitarist), guitarist for the 1980s band Kid Lightning
- John R. Massaro (born 1930), 8th Sergeant Major of the US Marine Corps
- Laura Massaro (born 1983), English squash player
- Mike Massaro (born 1970), racing analyst at ESPN for the NASCAR Sprint Cup Series
- Nicola Massaro, Italian painter of the late-Baroque period
- Paulo Massaro (born 1981), football player
- Roberto Massaro (born 1983), Italian football player
- Ryan Massaro or Amos Lee (born 1977), American singer-songwriter
- Sylvio Massaro, vocalist in Vanishing Point, an Australian pop group

== See also ==
- Massaro House, U.S. residence inspired by designs of a never-constructed project conceived by the architect Frank Lloyd Wright
- Masari
- Masaru
- Masoro (disambiguation)
- Massarah
- Massari
- Massaria
- Massarosa
- Masserano
- Mazaro
