= History of San Giorgio su Legnano =

History of the municipality of San Giorgio su Legnano, Italy

The coat of arms of the municipality of San Giorgio su Legnano

The earliest documented trace of the history of San Giorgio su Legnano, a municipality in the province of Milan in the Altomilanese, refers to an inscription engraved on some bricks dated 1393 where the word "Sotena," which is believed to be the original name of the San Giorgio community, is engraved. These bricks were found during some excavations carried out near the Church of the Most Holy Crucifix in 1769. The oldest archaeological evidence found in the territory of San Giorgio su Legnano, on the other hand, consists of Roman necropolises, the dating of which corresponds to the Imperial Age.

San Giorgio su Legnano was an agricultural town for centuries, whose stony soil provided the material for the construction of local farmsteads. At the end of the 19th century, an economic and social transformation began in the Altomilanese that led San Giorgio su Legnano to be included in one of the most industrialized areas in Italy. Between the end of the 20th century and the beginning of the 21st, however, a process of deindustrialization set in, causing the closure of many manufacturing activities.

== Prehistory ==
Origins of the name

The reference to the saint in the name of the municipality derives from a small church dedicated to St. George attached to a convent of Augustinian friars found in the Legnano countryside, the existence of which is attested in a manuscript from 1261. This monastery was the original nucleus of the Legnano Castle. It is likely that the presence of this monastery later led to the naming of not only the castle but also a district of Legnano (the "Costa di San Giorgio") and the neighboring municipality of San Giorgio su Legnano after Saint George.

In the Middle Ages the San Giorgio community was known as "Sotena" or "Sotera," as can be read in some parish archive notes that refer to a medieval find. The first reference to "San Giorgio" in the name of the town appears on documents from the early 15th century, which indicate the community as locus Sancti Georgi Plebis Parabiaghi Duc. Mlni ("locality of San Giorgio, of the parish of Parabiago, Duchy of Milan"), while on maps from the Borromeo era (16th century) the settlement is mentioned as Cascina Sancti Georgi Plebis Parabiaghi Duc. Mlni ("Farmstead of San Giorgio, of the parish of Parabiago, Duchy of Milan"). "San Giorgio" was part of the municipality of Legnano until 1535, from which it was divided after the administrative reform of Emperor Charles V of Habsburg.

After the Unification of Italy, following the issuance of Royal Decree No. 941 on October 23, 1862, the municipality took the name "San Giorgio su Legnano" to distinguish it from other municipalities of the same name.

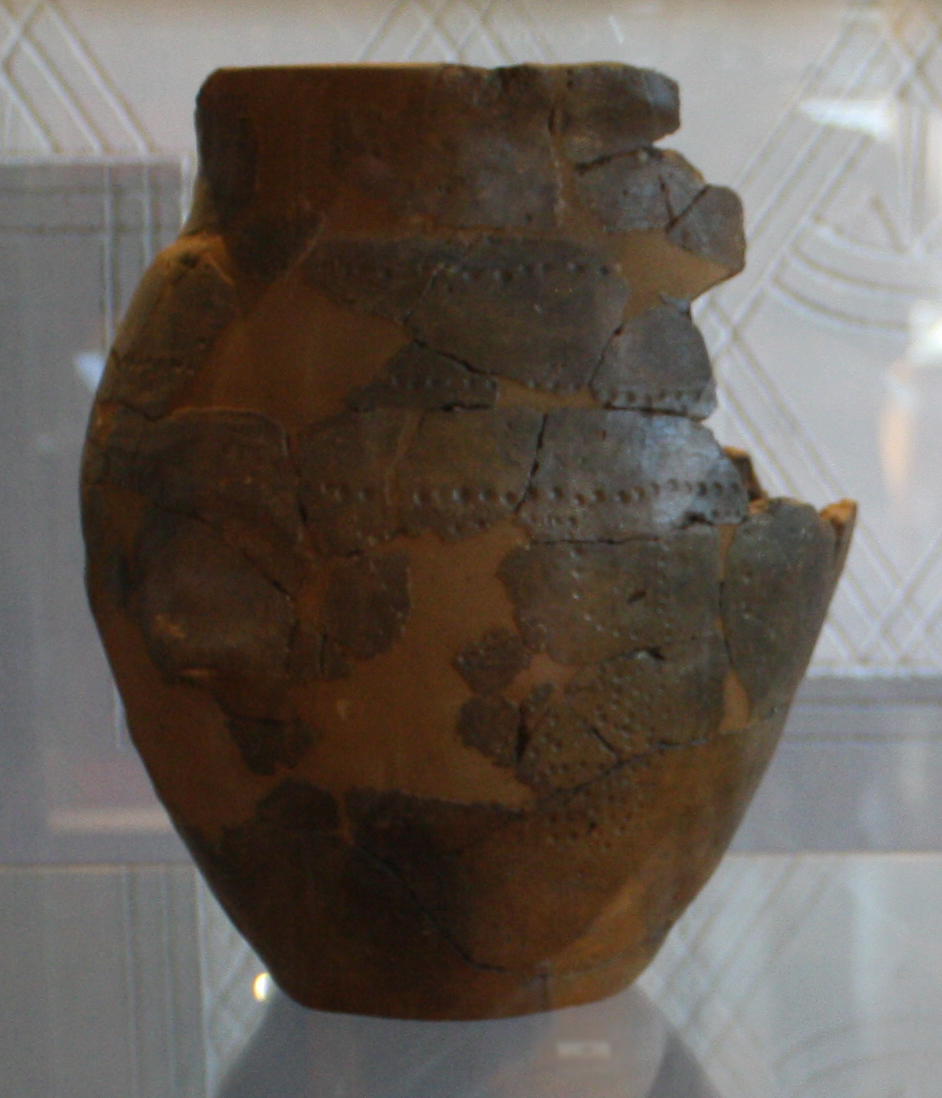
Clay ovoid jar with embossed decoration belonging to the Canegrate culture

In prehistoric times, the territory of San Giorgio was covered by moorlands. It was therefore an area where only bushes grew spontaneously, given the low fertility of the soil. Over the centuries, due to the fertilization work done by local farmers and the construction of artificial canals in the surrounding areas, the territory of San Giorgio was made cultivable. At one time vast areas were cultivated, and the flora of the wooded areas consisted mainly of pedunculate oak, hornbeam, chestnut, hazel, plane, ash, oak, poplar, elm, maple and alder trees.

Although no prehistoric archaeological remains have been found in the territory of San Giorgio, it cannot be ruled out that the area was frequented by people belonging to prehistoric cultures of which evidence has instead been found in neighboring territories. The oldest discovery in the Legnano area, dating back to the third millennium B.C., is a bowl made in the Copper Age and found near the border between Castellanza and Legnano, among Roman-era furnishings. It is preserved at the Guido Sutermeister Civic Museum.

In the Legnano area, the next prehistoric evidence are finds related to the Canegrate culture, discovered in the municipality of the same name bordering San Giorgio su Legnano and dating back to the 13th century BC. This culture developed from the Recent Bronze Age through the Iron Age.

The next archaeological finds that have been found in the area are two bronze spearheads, which are dated to between the 9th and 8th centuries B.C. They were found in Legnarello, a district of Legnano, in the last years of the 19th century and can be traced back to the archaic Golasecca culture (early Iron Age).

Other finds discovered in Legnano from later periods (5th century B.C.) are also attributable to the Golasecca culture.

From this it can be inferred that the middle Olona Valley was a relevant communication route at the time. On the other hand, the findings are multiple for the 2nd century B.C. and later, that is, at a time when the Roman conquest had already been completed.

== Roman era ==
The oldest archaeological evidence found in the territory of San Giorgio su Legnano consists of Roman necropolises, the dating of which corresponds to the Imperial Age (1st century B.C.-4th century A.D.). The oldest tombs are strongly influenced by the Celtic culture, as the process of Romanization was not yet complete. A widespread folk etymology of the word "Sotera," which has been circulating among the inhabitants of the area, would have it that this term was an allusion to the Roman necropolis ("underground," in the Legnanese dialect sota tèra).

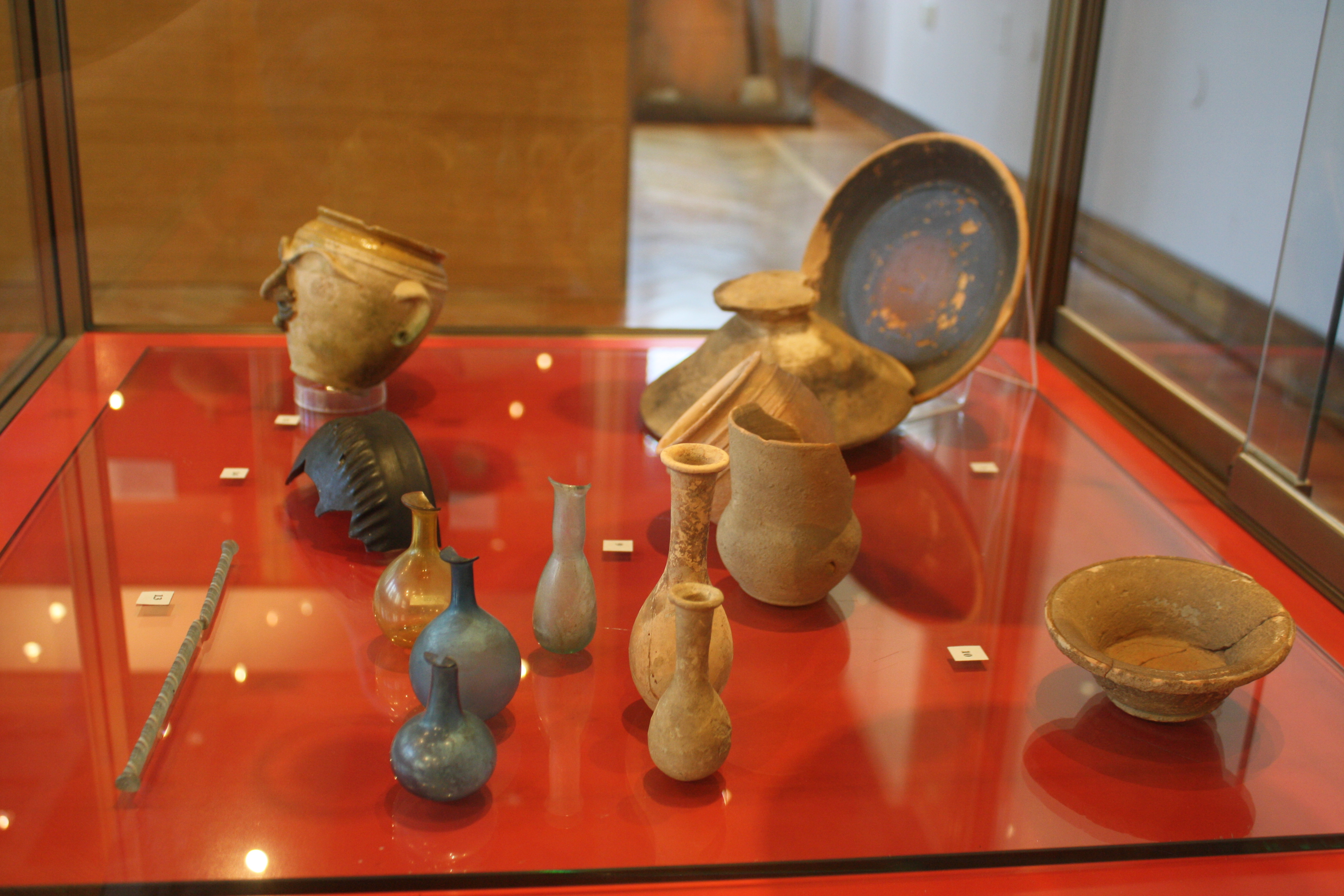
Findings from the Roman period (1st century B.C.- 1st century A.D.) discovered in San Giorgio su Legnano in 2004 in Via Trento

A total of two Roman necropolises were discovered. The first provided material dating from the first century B.C. to the fourth century. Initial excavations, which were carried out in 1925 on a farm in what was then Via Umberto I (now Via Mameli), unearthed a trove of miscellaneous pottery and iron implements datable to the Augustan period. Among them were a valuable black-glazed pottery and a purple glass bowl. In the second phase of the excavations, various artifacts came to light, including blue glass paste rings and a coin, which allowed its dating. This coin was a copper as of the Triumvir monetalis C. Gallius Lupercus that was issued in 16 CE.

In the second necropolis, excavated in 1952, more complete grave goods were found. Discovered near what is now Vittorio Veneto Street during construction work on a small villa, the necropolis consisted of twenty-three burials dated between the 1st century B.C. and the 1st century A.D., which yielded various archaeological materials including amphorae, kitchenware, balsam jars, oil lamps, knives, scrapers, nails, spindle whorls, and a coin, which made its dating possible. The coin had been issued in 8 B.C. during the monetary triumvirate of Marcelius Tullus. Other finds from the same historical period were discovered in 1927 inside the park of Villa Parravicini. These grave goods, which were contained in two tombs, consisted of a number of amphorae. Also belonging to this necropolis, several ceramic objects contained in three tombs and dating to the second half of the first century B.C. were found in 1987 during work on a sewage collector for a small villa. More artifacts were found in 2004 in Trento Street.

The findings testify that the territory of San Giorgio in late Roman times was intensively frequented, with the settlement of a wealthy social class. Unlike the early period of Roman rule, when the population was less intense, in the imperial age the area was involved in extensive trade with neighboring areas and was characterized by lively agricultural and livestock farming.

== Middle Ages ==
In the Middle Ages, the community of Sotena, like nearby Legnano, was on the border between the Contadi of Seprio (whose capital was Castelseprio) and Burgaria (probably under the hegemony of Parabiago), two counties dependent on the March of Lombardy, which was a territorial subdivision stemming from the Lombards and the Franks.

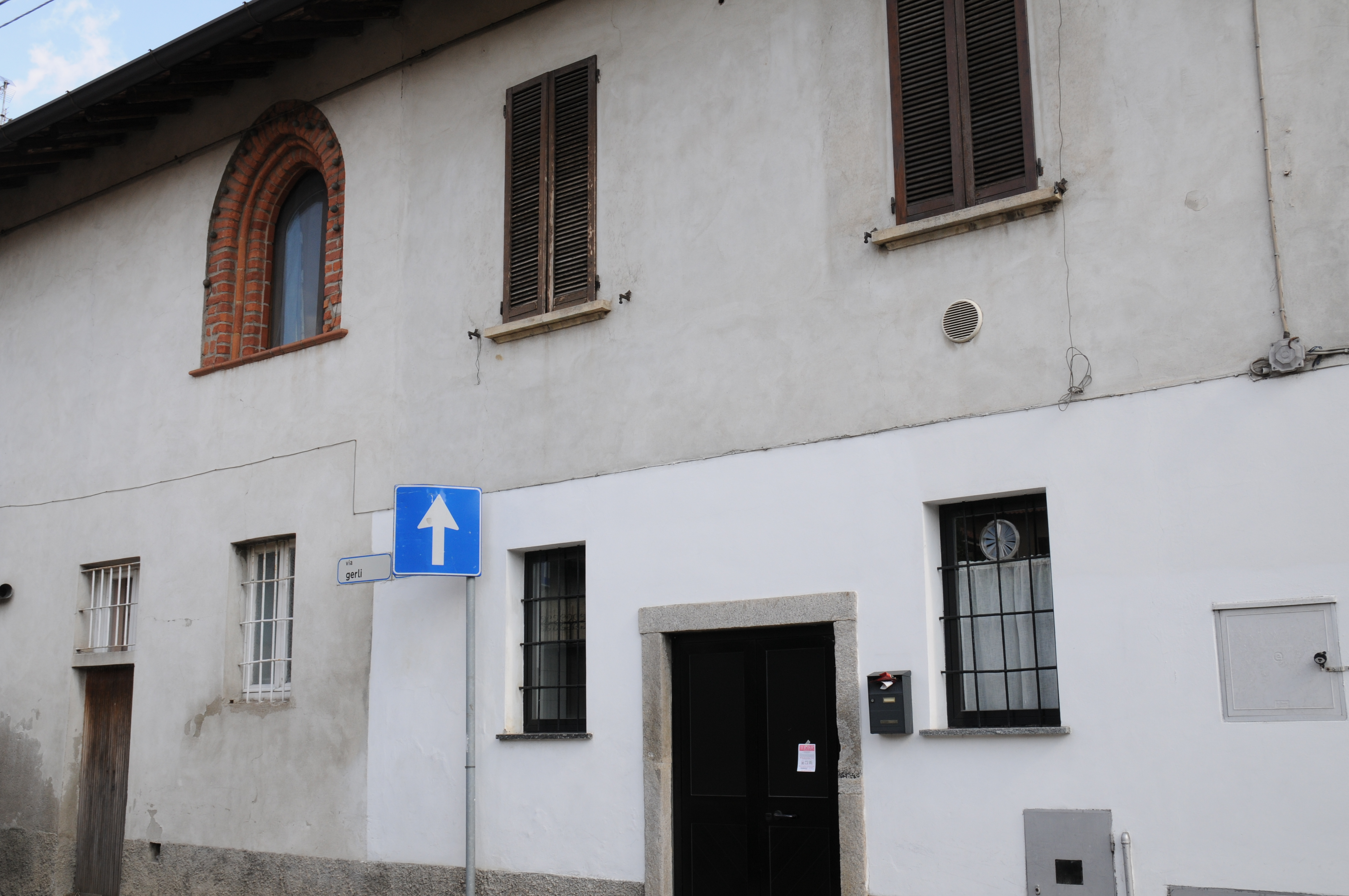
The "queen's house," perhaps the oldest building in the municipality

The earliest documented mention of the community of San Giorgio is an inscription carved on some bricks dated 1393, which were found during excavations at the Church of the Most Holy Crucifix carried out in 1769, as evidenced by notes in the parish archives:

[...] This village having lost its ancient name, adopted the name of its church entitled S. Giorgio. Since this church was demolished in the rebuilding of a new one in 1769 two large bricks were found in the foundations on which Count Giorgio Giulini wrote the following inscription: "MCCCLXXXXIII (1393) Die XXVI maii Fond.e prima Hae Ecclesia Hedificata per Comunem Istum Sotene ad Honorem dei Santi Georgii Quam Segrata Fuit per Dominum Archiepiscopun". From this inscription we see that this town was once called Sotena having the church of St. George consecrated by Archbishop Antonio, a Piedmontese Prince of Saluzzo who died in 1401, and from the rebuilding of a new one also derives the reason why that church is also now called "new" as it is the last one made in this town.

— Notes from the parish archives

Originally the community of San Giorgio was called "Sotena," and the church mentioned, now no longer extant and later replaced by the Church of the Crucifix, turns out to be the oldest temple of San Giorgio of which any record has been found. Apart from that inscription there is no written record of the San Giorgio community in the Middle Ages. In the register of churches in Goffredo da Bussero's Liber Notitiae Sanctorum Mediolani, which describes the religious context of the Milanese area in the late 13th and early 14th centuries, San Giorgio is not yet present. In this historical period, San Giorgio su Legnano was thus a small group of houses that did not yet have a church of its own; the first religious building in the community of which any trace has been found is the church mentioned above, which was consecrated in 1393.

The most probable hypothesis explaining the substitution of "Sotena" for "San Giorgio" is related to the presence of a monastery of Augustinian Regulars, with an adjoining small church dedicated to St. George, the existence of which is documented as early as 1231; however, the religious building does not appear in the aforementioned register of churches in the Liber Notitiae Sanctorum Mediolani. This monastery possessed a lot of arable land, owned by the Della Torre family, which extended beyond Legnano to Canegrate, San Vittore Olona, Villa Cortese and Dairago. The monks, as a result of the "bullying" suffered by the local powerful, abandoned the monastery, signing a deed of cession dated October 14, 1261.

When the canons left, a small building remained at the monastery, a tower (probably a watchtower), whose function was to control a road bordering the Olona River, which was strategic because it was an important communication route between Milan and northwestern Lombardy. Between 1261 and 1273 the Della Torre family, new owners of the building, built two wings to the right and left of the tower, transforming the original convent into a proper fortification. This manor, then called the Castle of San Giorgio, has come down to the 21st century and is today's Legnano Castle. The existence of the original convent dedicated to St. George would probably have transmitted the cult of the saint to the surrounding countryside, which, in turn, would have resulted in the dedication of the church of "Sotena" to St. George. Later, the saint gave his name to the community itself.

The only tangible evidence of medieval San Giorgio is a lancet window, with a terracotta border, found in a building overlooking the main square, the so-called "Queen's House," which is perhaps the oldest building in the town. On this dwelling, a coat of arms was placed until the 1930s, indicating that the building belonged to the Visconti family and which was removed by an antiquarian: traces of it were then lost.

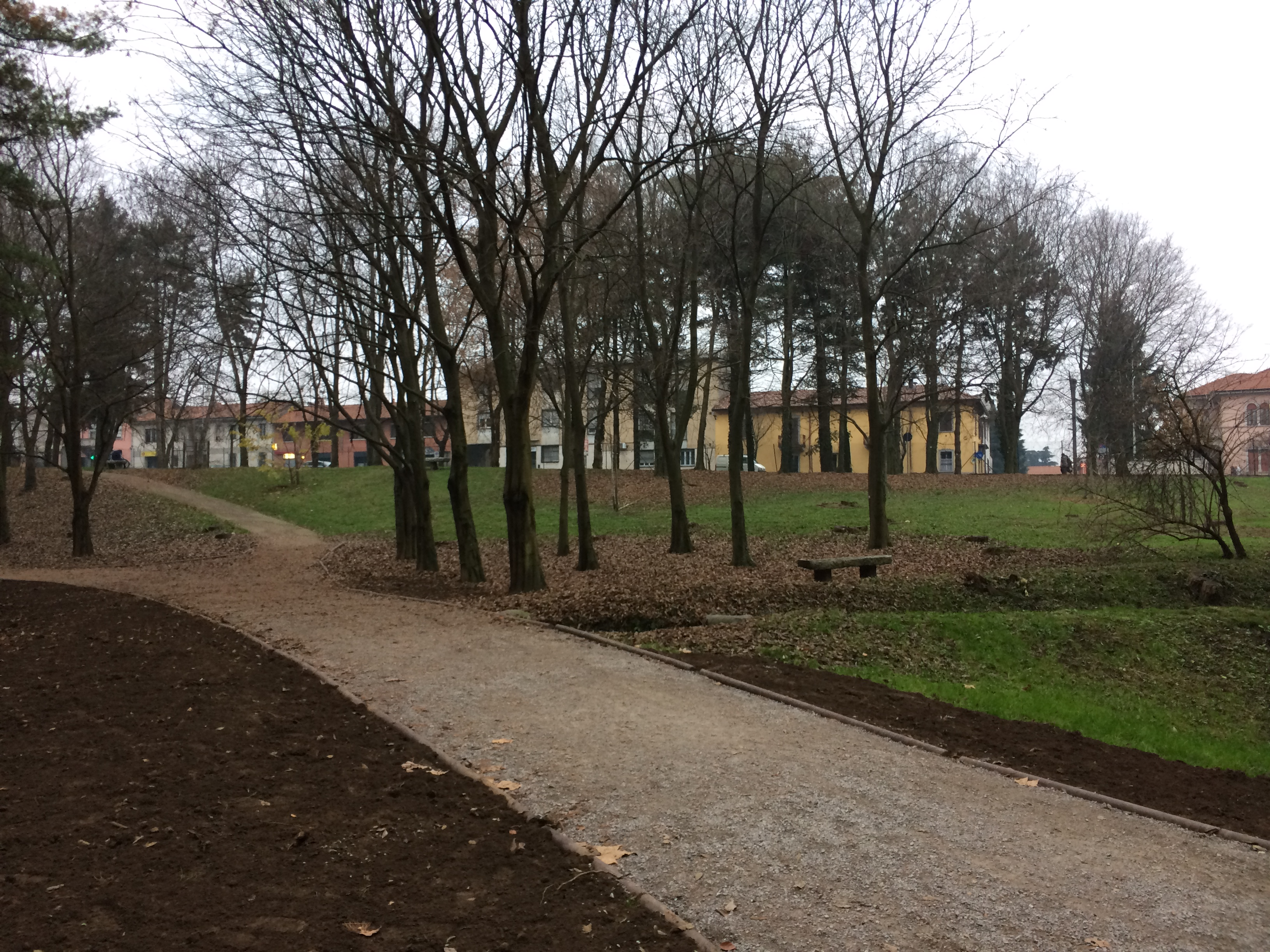
View of Castello Park in Legnano. The Legnano district of Costa San Giorgio can be seen in the background, while part of the escarpment that may have been the scene of the Battle of Legnano is visible in the foreground

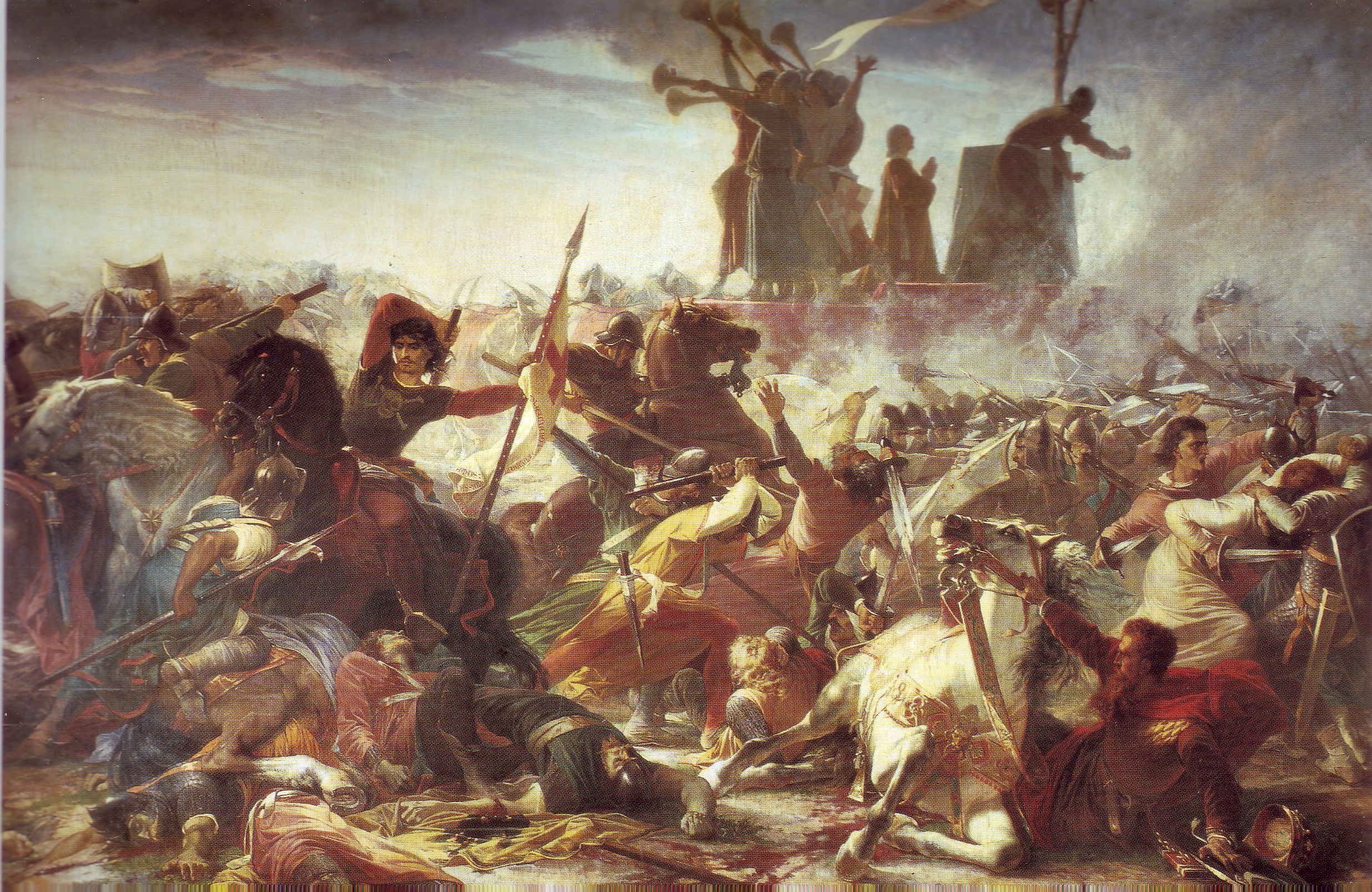
The Battle of Legnano. Detail from a painting by Amos Cassioli (1832-1891)

The Battle of Legnano may also have been fought on the territory of San Giorgio. One of the chronicles of the famous battle (May 29, 1176), the Annals of Cologne, contains a piece of information that indicates where the Carroccio probably stood, and thus where the clash plausibly would have been fought: so that no warrior could retreat, the Lombards "aut vincere aut mori parati, grandi fossa suum exercitum circumdederunt," that is, "ready to win or die on the field, they placed their army inside a large pit." This would suggest that the Carroccio was placed on the edge of a steep slope, so that the imperial cavalry, whose arrival was planned along the course of the Olona, would have been forced to assault the center of the Lombard League's army by climbing up the depression. Considering the phases of the clash, this could mean that the famous battle could also have been fought on San Giorgio soil in the vicinity of Legnano's "costa di San Giorgio" district, or on the territory of today's San Martino district in Legnano, since a depression with these characteristics could not be identified elsewhere in the area. Barbarossa's army then arrived from the opposite side, from Borsano: this forced the municipal infantrymen to resist around the Carroccio, since they had their escape route barred by the Olona River, which was behind them.

A popular legend has it that in those days an underground tunnel connected San Giorgio to the castle of Legnano, and that through this tunnel Emperor Frederick I Barbarossa managed to escape and save himself after defeat in battle. In the 20th century, during some excavations, sections of a very ancient underground tunnel were actually found. The first one, not far from San Giorgio su Legnano, was explored by one of the workers who unearthed it. The worker was dissuaded from exploration after traveling five or six meters because of a gust of wind that blew out the candle. A second section towards Legnano was discovered and immediately obstructed by the city administration for safety reasons. In addition, during some excavations carried out in 2014 at Legnano Castle, the entrance to another secret tunnel was identified.

In April 1273, Napoleone and Francesco della Torre hosted the English royals Edward I and Eleanor of Castile in Milan on their return home from a trip to the Middle East. As they took their leave, they led them as far as the Legnano Castle of San Giorgio, where they stayed for one night. However, a popular San Giorgio legend claims that the royals, on their way back, stayed overnight in San Giorgio su Legnano in the "Queen's House." On documents of the time, the event is described by mentioning that the British royals were hosted "at Santo Georgio presso Legnano."

== Modern era ==
=== 15th and 16th centuries ===
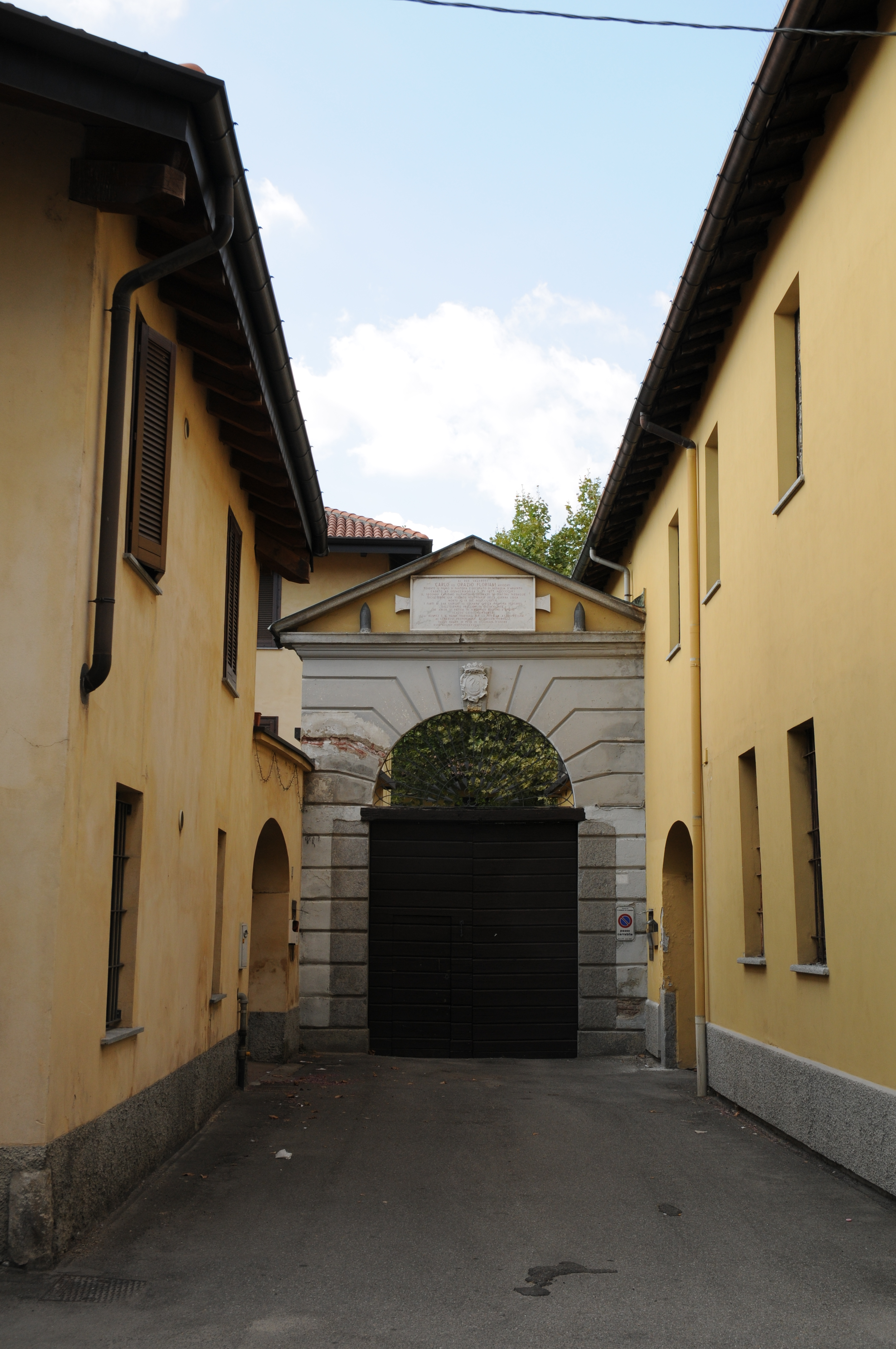
Villa Parravicini.

The document subsequent to the brick found at the Church of the Crucifix that refers to the community of San Giorgio dates back to the 15th century and indicates the settlement as locus Sancti Georgi Plebis Parabiaghi Duc. Mlni ("locality of San Giorgio, of the parish of Parabiago, Duchy of Milan"), while on maps from the Borromeo era (16th century) the settlement is mentioned as Cascina Sancti Georgi Plebis Parabiaghi Duc. Mlni ("Farmstead of San Giorgio, of the parish of Parabiago, Duchy of Milan"). Ancient San Giorgio was part of the Municipality of Legnano until 1535, from which it was divided after the administrative reform of Emperor Charles V of Habsburg.

The first document that describes in more detail the San Giorgio community of the time is the Spanish cadastre of 1558, which is preserved in the Historical Archives of the Municipality of Milan. The information that can be obtained from this document is rather scarce, but it allows us to draw a social and economic profile of San Giorgio at the time. The Spanish government decided to create a land register to survey the real estate in the Duchy of Milan and impose taxes accordingly. In 1558, as reflected in this cadastre, San Giorgio consisted of eleven courtyards, of whose layout the document specifies nothing. Sixteenth-century San Giorgio was thus still a village of modest size. All courtyards had a contiguous vegetable garden, and the land owned by San Giorgio citizens at the time covered an area of nearly 1,600 Milanese perches. There were thirty-five owners, grouped into fifteen families. However, the Spanish land register did not include land belonging to the Church, which was exempt from taxation, and to the Visconti. Nevertheless, with regard to the latter, there were also properties in Legnano Castle connected to the Milanese family mentioned above. It can be assumed that the latter occupied about 1,000 perches of territory. The ecclesiastical properties would be surveyed for the first time in 1721 by the Austrian government. The land in the cadastral list was allocated as follows: 1,400 perches were cultivated with vines, 100 perches were allocated to dwellings and vegetable gardens, 50 were occupied by wooded areas that also provided timber for heating the dwellings, and 100 were allocated to plow crops. The information listed cannot be considered accurate, however, as there was hostility on the part of the owners to declare the size of their property in order to evade taxes.

At the time, the community depended, for both civil and religious aspects, on the Parish of Parabiago, which included the communities of Arluno, Canegrate, Cantalupo, Cerro, Casorezzo, Legnano, Parabiago, Rescaldina, San Giorgio, San Vittore, Uboldo and Villastanza. The civil parish of Parabiago differed from the religious parish because it did not include Legnano, Rescaldina and Villastanza. In 1584 Charles Borromeo decreed the displacement of the religious head parish from Parabiago to Legnano, so that the religious head parish no longer belonged to the civil one. The latter, which still had its seat in Parabiago, was subject to the authority of the Contado of Seprio, which was governed by a captain or vicar who resided in Gallarate and supervised, among other things, justice and police.

In the 16th century, the individual communities of Legnano were administered by civil officials, i.e., mayors, consuls, councilors, tax collectors and the inhabitants with the highest income. They were united in a general council, and even then the mayor was the representative of the entire community; some communities, such as Legnano, San Vittore and Cerro, were run by multiple mayors, while other towns, such as Arluno and Rescaldina, lacked mayors. In San Giorgio there was only one mayor. The mayor was supported by consuls, who managed the police, and chancellors, whose duties were similar to those of the municipal secretary in the system of today's Italian Republic. Among other duties, he kept the municipal archives in his own house. In San Giorgio these officials were chosen, by at least two-thirds of the heads of families and the wealthiest, summoned to the public square at the sound of the bell.

From this century are the founding of the parish of San Giorgio (December 12, 1549) and the dating of the first document mentioning the Parravicini villa. In Ludovico Crivelli's will, dated 1584 and kept in the State Archives of Milan, the noble building is in fact mentioned as belonging to the noble Milanese family.

=== 17th century ===
One of the defining aspects of San Giorgio's history in the 17th century was the infeudation. During this century the Spanish government put many lands up for auction where the buyer, who thus became a feudatory, had the prerogative of claiming political, economic, and social rights over the fiefdom. Communities had the option to redeem the land by paying a fee that was set according to the number of families in the community. San Giorgio secured redemption in 1648 by contracting a debt of 3,000 liras with Francesco Castelli, a landowner. Two years of poor harvests, however, prevented the San Giorgio community from repaying the money loaned. For this reason the people of San Giorgio asked Camillo Castelli, son of Francesco, who had died in the meantime, to be enfeoffed for 3,430 liras. The enfeoffment took place on November 10, 1656. The Spanish-era feuds, however, were totally different from those of the medieval age. The latter, in fact, presupposed the existence of a feudal lord, endowed with extensive powers and conspicuous land holdings, who was directly answerable to the sovereign and had important military powers; therefore, he mainly dwelt within his fiefdom. In contrast, the feudal lords of the 17th-century Spanish government had more of a formal function, and the enfeoffed villages were not subject to any burdens associated with the enfeoffment. The Spanish-era feudal lord was represented by a feudal podestà, whose function was akin to that of the consuls. In the case of San Giorgio, in 1751 the citizens, responding to a request for information submitted by the central government, declared that to the feudal lord "nothing at all is paid." The feud, however, provided the titular families with a great advantage: the possibility of obtaining noble titles. In fact, at that time it was permitted to become a feudal lord without noble titles, but the reverse was not permitted.

The community of San Giorgio remained a fief of the Castelli family until 1780, when with the death of Cardinal Giuseppe Castelli, the last descendant of the lineage, the debt was extinguished. The fiefs were then abolished shortly thereafter, in 1796.

In the 17th century the Spanish government updated the cadastre begun in the previous century. The first finding from the new information is the change in ownership of many real estate properties. This can be interpreted by considering that many economically weaker owners, as a result of high taxation and limited income from land, were forced to cede their properties to financially stronger parties. It is no coincidence that in the mid-seventeenth century two Milanese noble families of Como origin, the aforementioned Castelli and the Parravicini, appeared in San Giorgio. The former were owners of several estates in the parish of Parabiago and, as already mentioned, became feudal lords of the San Giorgio community, while the latter made their first purchases in San Giorgio in 1643 from the Belloni and De Gay. Later, in 1648, they became owners of an aristocratic complex that would later take their name, Villa Parravicini. Previously, this noble mansion belonged to the Crivelli family.

As for the precise data from the Spanish land register, at the end of the 17th century there were 21 property-owning households in San Giorgio. There were 22 houses surveyed, while the land covered an area of 1,778 Milanese perches. Specifically, the land in the cadastral list was allocated as follows: 1,482 perches were cultivated with vines, 73 perches were occupied instead by dwellings and vegetable gardens, 183 perches were allocated to woods, 30 perches were used for plow crops, and finally 10 perches were occupied by moorland.

The old church of the Blessed Virgin of the Assumption, which no longer exists, was presumably built in this century. The earliest documented records of the religious building date from 1750, the year of its expansion. The building, in Baroque style, possessed a single nave that was complemented by side chapels. The apse was frescoed. The facade had a simple workmanship and was decorated with lesenes. On the left side of the facade was the bell tower, while the oratory of St. Louis was located on the right. The former parish ended its religious services in October 1934. It was deconsecrated, by archiepiscopal decree, on February 24, 1936, and was sold by the parish on January 9, 1948. It was demolished in 1974.

In the area where the victims of the plague of 1630 were buried, the 17th-century chapel Madona di Baldeur was built. Inside was visible the image of the Madonna and Child. Annually a procession was made from the village to the little chapel in commemoration of those who died from the plague, and a feast followed the ceremony. It was demolished in 1986 for the construction of Carlo Alberto Dalla Chiesa Street.

=== 18th century ===
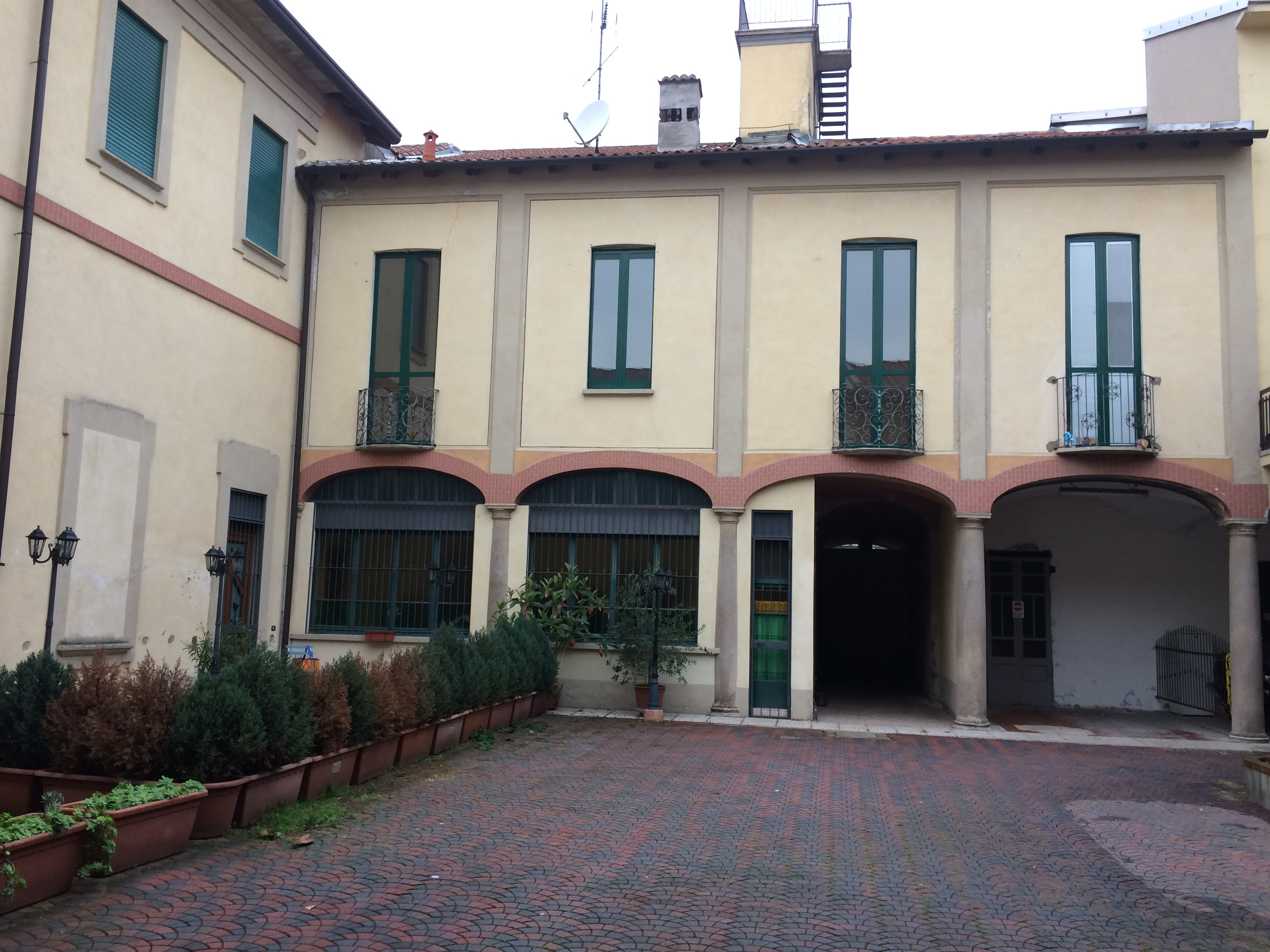
Lucini Arborio Mella Palace. The oldest records referring to this noble mansion date back to the 18th century.

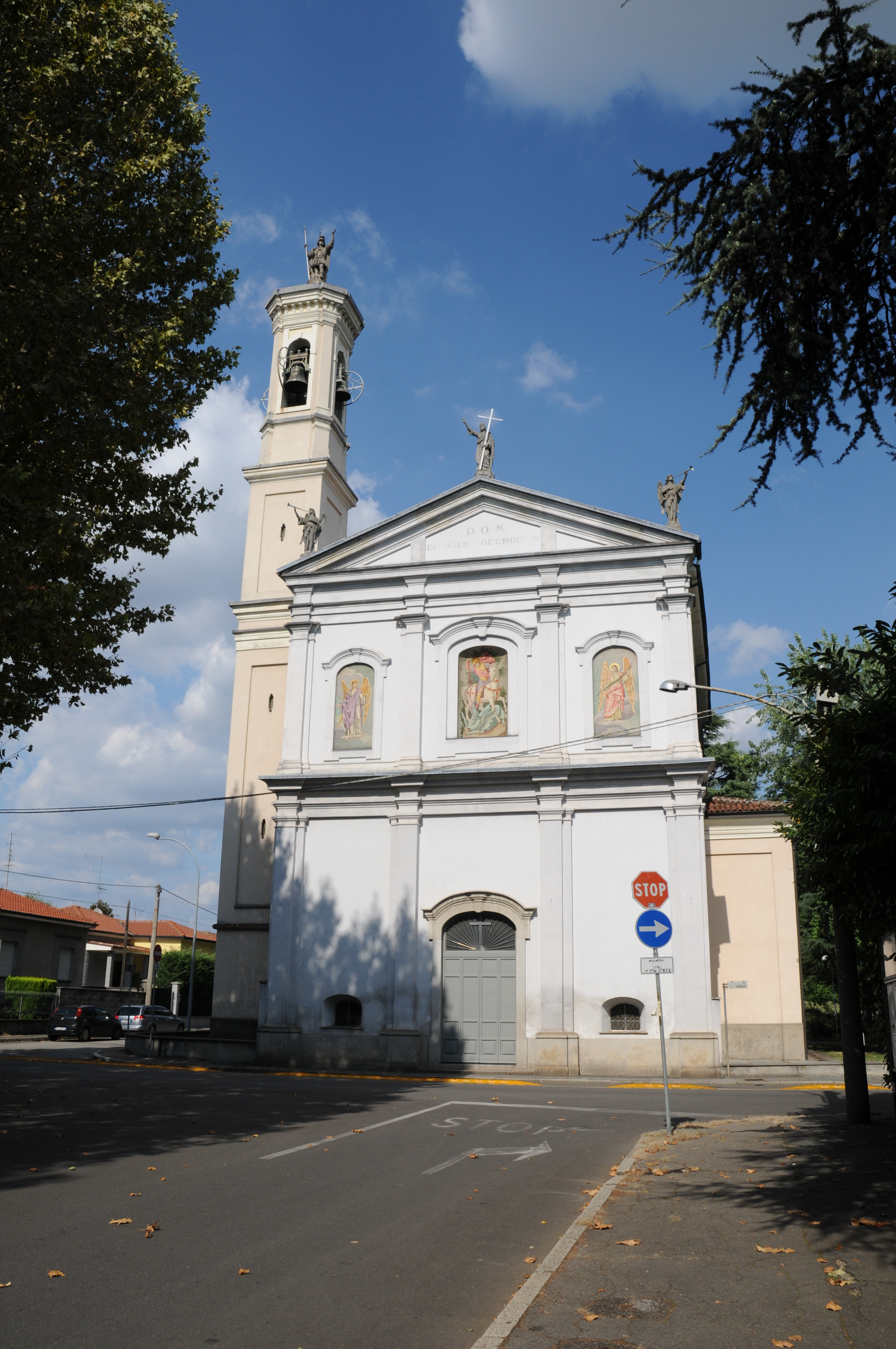
The Church of the Most Holy Crucifix. It was consecrated in 1703

In 1706 the Austrians replaced the Spanish as rulers of the Duchy of Milan. Among the initiatives promoted by the new government was the preparation of a cadastre that was characterized by having much more detailed parameters than the previous ones. In addition to the precise measurement of all real estate, houses and land, a map was also made for each municipality in the Duchy. For the first time, the properties of the Church, which until then had been exempt from taxation, were also surveyed.

Emperor Charles VI then issued a decree that established a working group, whose task was to accurately survey the municipalities belonging to his Lombard domains. In the case of San Giorgio, the determination of the size of the territory began on November 20, 1721, by a team of surveyors and draughtsmen led by surveyor Benito Corradini. In addition to the size of the municipality, all inhabitants were registered and all real estate was catalogued. The work took eight days to complete. The result was a 1:2000 scale map showing real estate (land and buildings), as well as the boundaries of the municipality. A copy of this map is still kept in the town hall today and also accurately shows the outlines of the buildings. These were gathered around the aforementioned 17th-century parish church, which no longer exists. In addition, the map shows the name given by the people of San Giorgio to the various plots of land, a designation from oral tradition. This map was complemented by a document, called a "sommarione," where the various real estate properties were arranged in a list, indicating the extent and destination of the land.

The inhabitants of San Giorgio su Legnano, as of March 16, 1730, numbered 777 and resided in 60 courtyards. There were 58 owners of real estate, although 11 of them owned as much as 92 percent of the land in the municipality. According to this cadastre, San Giorgio had an area of 3,133 Milanese perches. From a 1751 census some information about the social life of San Giorgio at the time is also available. The town's parish priest lived in the Viscarda street (today's Via Garibaldi), while the Contrada Lunga (today's Via Cavour) was home to the blacksmith, the public bakery and the well.

Between 1755 and 1758 the administrative bodies of the municipalities were reformed by Empress Maria Theresa of Austria. The general councilors disappeared and were replaced by a general assembly consisting of all citizens holding real estate. The offices of mayor, consul and collector were retained, but they were joined by two auditors. In the general assembly there was a group of five deputies who directly chose the mayor.

Eighteenth-century San Giorgio was thus a small agricultural community governed by a relatively poor economy, though adequate for the people of San Giorgio at the time to live a dignified life.

From this century is the consecration of the Church of the Most Holy Crucifix (1703). Until 1933, in order to differentiate it from the old parish church located in the square, it was called the "new church." Also from this century are the most important decorations of another noble villa in San Giorgio, Palazzo Lucini Arborio Mella, with frescoes painted by Biagio Bellotti in 1750 on the vault of the main hall. The time of construction of this building, however, is unknown.

== Contemporary era ==
=== 19th century ===
In Napoleonic times, from an administrative point of view, the municipality of San Giorgio was suppressed and incorporated into the neighboring municipality of Canegrate. It was part of the aforementioned municipality from November 4, 1809 to November 8, 1811.

On the social and economic front, this period was characterized by the profound transformation of the San Giorgio production system. The agricultural economy that had characterized the community for centuries gradually gave way to an industrial system.

In the 19th century, agricultural crops in San Giorgio were very varied. The main crops were cereals (millet and wheat), vines, and mulberry trees, the basis of silkworm breeding. In addition to cereal cultivation, the economy of San Giorgio su Legnano was also based on livestock breeding, and in particular silkworm breeding was supplementary to the preponderant agricultural activity in the fields. Vines, on the other hand, represented the most widespread crop in the area. In fact, in 1723, about 70 percent of the territory of San Giorgio was cultivated with vineyards. Vines were so common that, even in 1855, San Giorgio su Legnano was among the communities where the fraction of land worked with vineyards was preponderant.

The common agricultural contract in the Altomilanese in the early 19th century was metayage. By the 18th century, however, a transformation of the relationship between peasants and landlords was already underway, which would lead to a system that would last until the early 20th century: the mixed "grain" contract. Some aspects of the metayage contract were retained, however. The main novelty of the new system was that the farmer had to provide a fixed share of grain to the owner (for grain was the most easily marketable commodity), regardless of the size of the harvest. Because of this, the farmers of San Giorgio suffered a worsening of their situation, as household incomes were subject to fluctuations in production caused, for example, by weather conditions or mismanagement of agricultural activities.

In the second half of the 19th century, the first small proto-industrial activities appeared. The foundation of the first nucleus of the Giovanni Restelli Weaving Mill, the first textile company started in San Giorgio, dates back to 1865. The fabrics mainly processed were cotton and silk. In 1942 the company was bought by Tessitura Nosatese, which after the acquisition took the name Tessitura di Nosate e San Giorgio.

As a document from 1872 shows, two proto-industries for silk processing (one for processing and the other for twisting the yarn) were also based in San Giorgio su Legnano. Altogether they employed about two hundred people, mostly women. They were not, however, the ancestors of the modern enterprises that sprang up a few decades later, since they were still deeply linked to agricultural activity, of which they were an appendage. Instead, as revealed by a written record from 1891, proto-industrial activities included a branch of the Kramer & C. silk factory in Legnano, which employed 142 citizens of San Giorgio, and an artisanal business for the production of liquor. However, these proto-industrial activities were the first sign of a transformation that would affect the economy of San Giorgio shortly thereafter. The first businesses decoupled from agriculture were founded in the late 19th and early 20th centuries.

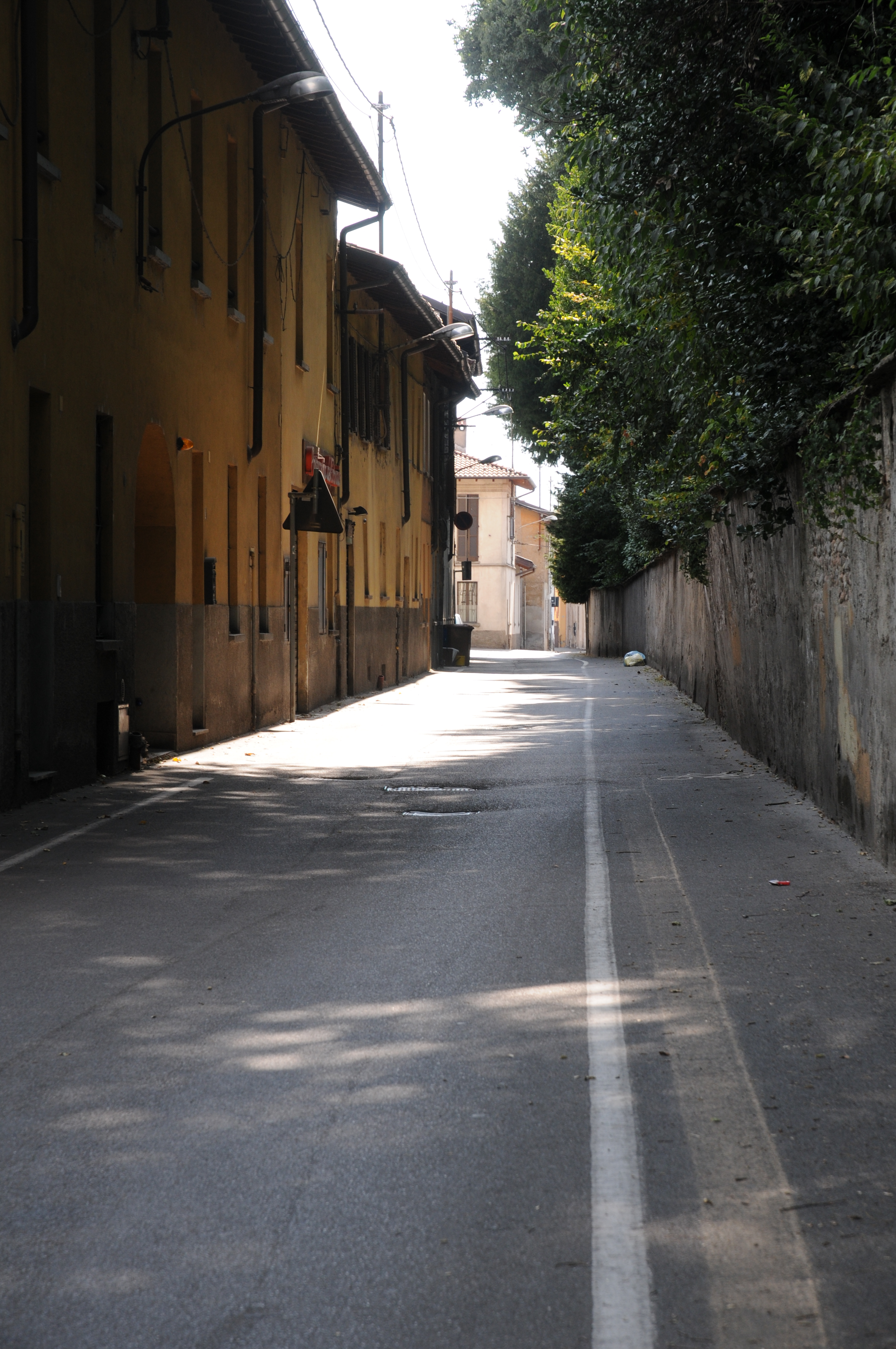
Gerli Street

The process of industrialization that led to the gradual transformation of the economy of San Giorgio was accelerated by two natural disasters that threw local agriculture into crisis: cryptogamia, a disease that affected the grapevine, and pébrine, an epidemic that damaged silkworm cocoons. For the first infection, which appeared between 1851 and 1852, the result in Lombardy was a rapid fall in the amount of wine produced. The hectoliters of wine produced fell from 1,520,000 in 1838 to 550,000 in 1852. The final blow to wine production came from two other vine diseases that struck the plant between 1879 and 1890: downy mildew and phylloxera. As a result of these epidemics, wine cultivation in San Giorgio su Legnano disappeared for good, and farmers concentrated their efforts on grain production and silkworm breeding. In other wine-growing areas the problem was solved by grafting species of vines immune to the disease (fox grape). This, however, did not happen in San Giorgio: in fact, in 1911 about 80 percent of the agricultural land in San Giorgio su Legnano was reported to be used for mulberry cultivation, with vine cultivation having completely disappeared.

Shortly after the vine disease spread, an infection of the silkworm, pébrine, appeared. It was so called because it was revealed by small dark spots covering the silkworm's body. It was a disease that had never appeared before, and it was considerably more dangerous than the muscardine that had been ruining part of the crop for centuries. Mulberry cultivation did not follow the fate of viticulture, however. In fact, the end of silkworm cultivation was less rapid than that of viticulture. In San Giorgio, mulberry trees were cultivated until the first part of the 20th century. In addition to this, in the second part of the 19th century Europe was hit by an agricultural crisis involving cereal crops. This was due to the spread in markets of competitively priced American grains. Vast areas of the U.S. Middle West were earmarked for cultivation. In addition, due to technological advancement, a sharp drop in sea transportation costs took place. The effect was a profound crisis that affected grain crops in Europe. This conjuncture peaked in the 1880s and characterized agriculture on the Old Continent until the beginning of the 20th century. This event gave further impetus to the industrialization of the Altomilanese, as it also undermined the most important branch of agriculture in the area after the disappearance of vineyards and the crisis of silkworm breeding, the cultivation of cereals.

The first reaction of the people of San Giorgio at the time was an effort to evolve and advance the agricultural society. The attempt failed, however, and so the San Giorgio society turned to industry. At this point for the economic and social structure of San Giorgio su Legnano began a phase that led to the emergence of an industrial system, which supplanted the centuries-old agricultural system. The change was not without a hindrance, however, as it changed a social structure that had been rooted in the community for centuries.

In 1821 an event occurred that affected the less well-off citizens of San Giorgio. With the death of Abbot Gaspare Raimondi on November 10, 1821, his will, which provided for the payment of 100,000 liras to the Policlinico of Milan for the hospitalization of the poorest patients of San Giorgio. For this reason Abbot Raimondi, a resident of San Giorgio, was dedicated a street in the town center. In 1909 the municipality of San Giorgio sued the hospital because it had recently decided to refuse patients from neighboring towns, thus also denying Abbot Raimondi's testamentary bequest. All pending disputes of this kind, also due to the introduction of mutual societies, were considered extinct, and thus the hospital succeeded.

San Giorgio was also affected by events related to the Risorgimento. Between the First and Second Wars of Independence, Marquis Giuseppe Parravicini, a staunch patriot, buried his armaments inside a well located within his villa, fearing a search by the Austrians. These weapons were later discovered in the 20th century by his descendants. Among them, a rifle was found on the barrel of which the date 1841 was inscribed with the trademark and the number 490. A bayonet and a sword were also found.

After the military occupation of Lombardy by the Kingdom of Sardinia during the Second War of Independence, San Giorgio was aggregated to the Gallarate district and the Saronno district. With the Rattazzi Decree of October 23, 1859, the administrative geography of the entire Savoy State was radically redrawn. Even after the cessation of hostilities and the proclamation of the Kingdom of Italy, the new administrative structure did not change, and San Giorgio remained part of the same territorial organizations until the 1920s, when the mandimenti and circondari were abolished. The Rattazzi decree also sanctioned that the San Giorgio community would be administered by a fifteen-member council and a two-person junta.

By Royal Decree No. 941 of Oct. 23, 1862, signed by Victor Emmanuel II of Savoy, the municipality's name was changed to distinguish it from other municipalities of the same name, the Unification of Italy having taken place in the meantime. From "San Giorgio" it changed to today's "San Giorgio su Legnano." Later, following the first law of the unified Italian state on municipal organization (1865), it was decreed that San Giorgio su Legnano, like all municipalities, would be administered by a mayor, a council and a town council.

In 1892 the former town hall on Via Gerli was inaugurated. Built to house elementary schools and municipal offices, it retained this function until 1929, when construction of the new school complex in Piazza IV Novembre, designed by Gino Maggioni, was completed. From 1929 to 1992, the building on Via Gerli was home exclusively to the town hall. After that date, the town hall became the same building in Piazza IV Novembre, which still has this function today.

=== 20th and 21st centuries ===
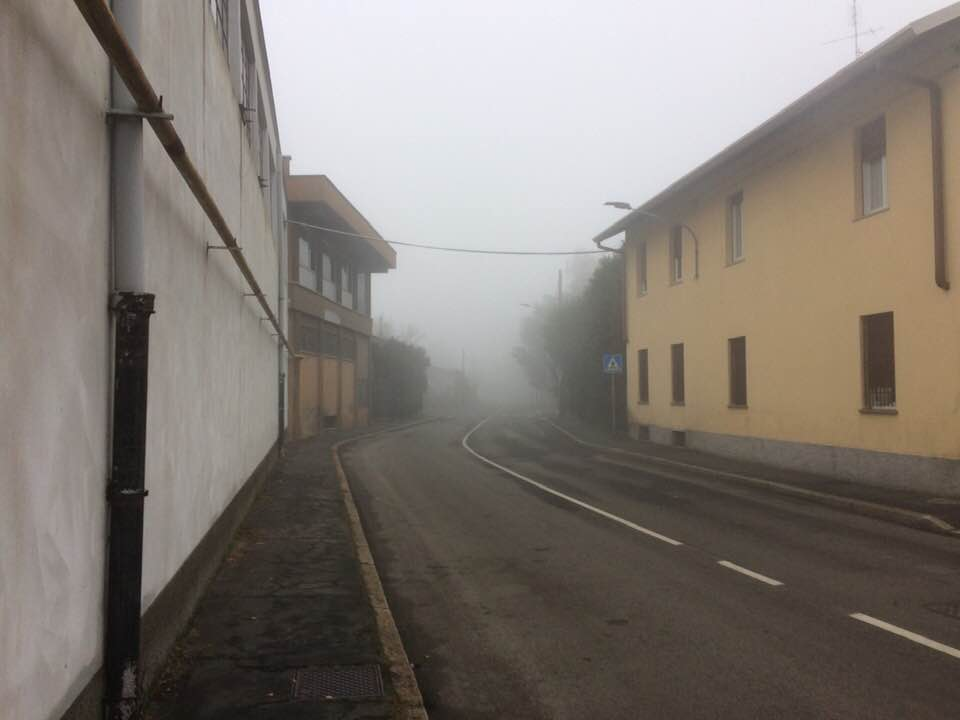
Via Monte Grappa in San Giorgio su Legnano during a foggy day. On the left, the Fonderia getti speciali Colombo Giuseppe di Carlo e figli

In 1911 the Ministry of Agriculture, Industry and Trade released data from the first statistical survey of industrial establishments. Out of 3,015 residents of San Giorgio, almost 50 percent worked in the industrial sector. To give a more precise idea about the economic system of San Giorgio in the early twentieth century, it would suffice to mention the animals in the San Giorgio stables in 1937, compared to nearly 3,900 inhabitants: 17 oxen, 31 calves, 126 cows, 46 horses, 3 donkeys, 1 mule, 1 hinny, 12 pigs and 11 goats. To complete the picture around the agricultural economy of the community of San Giorgio, in the early 1940s the cultivated fields provided about 1,800 quintals of wheat, 400 quintals of rye and 80 quintals of oats annually. These figures show that the San Giorgio production system at the beginning of the 20th century was based on an industrial economy where the agricultural system still possessed a certain importance. From this period is the founding of many historic San Giorgio industries.

From the beginning of the 20th century are two important events in the history of San Giorgio, which testify to the continuation of the industrialization process. On October 11, 1902, the city council gave the green light to the placement of an electric line between San Giorgio and Castano Primo, and this offered decisive support to the industrial development of the municipality. The second event was the establishment in San Giorgio as well, in the early twentieth century, of the first offices of trade unions. This testified to an important change in the social structure of the community, which was beginning to adapt to the changing economic structure.

In the same period, the Abbiategrasso-Magenta-Legnano-Busto Arsizio railway project, which would have had a station in San Giorgio, was definitively discarded: the reason for this shelving lay in the fact that the Milan-Gallarate line was more convenient as a railway line connecting Genoa with the Simplon Tunnel, since it passed through the Milanese capital. The Abbiategrasso-Busto Arsizio railway shortened the route between Genoa and Busto Arsizio, but this was not deemed sufficient to decree its construction. The reasons for the non-construction were mainly two, the protests of the small municipalities, which wanted changes to the project to run the railway through their territory, and the firm opposition of Milan, which feared the loss of traffic along the Milan-Sesto Calende railway: all of which caused the start of construction to be continually postponed. It was then decided not to build a second Upper Milanese railway: the decision was made by the outbreak of World War I.

In 1908 the Unione Sportiva Sangiorgese was established as the Velo Club San Giorgio. Initially, the association devoted itself exclusively to cycling. In 1921 it was transformed into a sports association, and during the following year it adopted a statute. Over the years it broadened its focus to include many sports such as athletics, basketball, volleyball, skiing and hiking, becoming a multi-sports club.

The opening of the present kindergarten building took place on April 30, 1911. Since 1897 there had been a kindergarten that had been carrying out its function in some premises temporarily ceded by the municipal administration. These premises, however, were requested by the municipality to be used as classrooms, and so it was decided to construct a new building that would be used specifically as a kindergarten. Most of the money was donated by the wealthier citizens of San Giorgio, although the remaining part of the townspeople also offered donations. Some of the money also came from the charitable organization "Victor Emmanuel II." The latter funds were later returned in installments. To celebrate the building's inauguration, Queen Elena donated a bronze sculpture entitled The Wasp, by sculptor Guendalina Williams, to the lucky dip for the San Giorgio kindergarten.

When Italy entered World War I, many San Giorgio citizens left for the front. In the fighting, 35 military personnel from San Giorgio died (30 soldiers, a major corporal, three corporals and a lieutenant). The war also caused many restrictions and sufferings that were experienced by the community of San Giorgio even in the years immediately following the end of the conflict. The first signs of recovery were there between 1920 and 1923. An important event of these years, which is an indication of this progress, is the beginning of the work on the placement of drinking water pipes.

After the conflict and following the March on Rome, Fascism took power in Italy. The last democratically elected mayor of San Giorgio was Riccardo Viganò who was replaced, after a period of commissarial rule, by Virgilio Maggioni. Maggioni in 1927 was appointed podestà, a position he held until 1936. During the Fascist dictatorship the democratic organs of the municipalities were suppressed and all the functions previously performed by the mayor, the junta and the council were transferred to the podestà, who was appointed by the government. The podestà was assisted by a municipal council, which was appointed by the prefect.

In the 1920s, the space for classrooms and municipal offices within the building on Via Gerli proved insufficient, so the municipal administration purchased a portion of Palazzo Lucini Arborio Mella in 1924 to house part of its administrative offices. Three important public buildings and a monument were also constructed in this decade: they were the Aqueduct Tower (1921, now no longer extant), the War Memorial (1921), the municipal cemetery (1928), and the present town hall (originally intended as an elementary school, 1929). The latter three buildings were designed by Gino Maggioni. For the last two works alone, the cost estimate was 425,000 liras. The schools in Piazza IV Novembre were inaugurated on October 20, 1929. Their construction was necessary as a result of the school reorganization known as the Gentile Reform, which obliged municipalities to build schools adequate to hold a larger number of pupils. With the construction of the new school complex in Piazza IV Novembre, all municipal offices, which were also previously housed in the Lucini Arborio Mella Palace, were moved to the building on Via Gerli. On April 24, 1921, the aqueduct tower was inaugurated, later demolished at the turn of the 20th century and replaced by a new tower built in the 1990s.

The establishment of the "Casa del Circolo Società Anonima per azioni" in today's Family Circle building, which already existed at the beginning of the 20th century and was originally intended for commercial activities, dates back to 1926. In 1936 the business name was changed to a Cooperative Society, a function it maintained for decades. In the 1950s the building was expanded to its present size. On December 17, 2003, the Family Circle donated the building it owned to the Municipality of San Giorgio with the latter's commitment that social activities would continue within the structure.

On April 23, 1935, the new parish church, which replaced the previous one, was consecrated. It is built in a neo-Renaissance style of Bramantesque influence. On the eight sides are side chapels and the presbytery. The two side chapels, one dedicated to the Sacred Heart and the other to Our Lady, are augmented, forming a circle-shaped surround closed by a dome. Another peculiarity of the church is the use of exposed bricks of clear Lombard origin.

In 1936, due to the celibacy law that introduced a tax on unmarried people and prohibited them from holding public office, Virgilio Maggioni, who was unmarried, was replaced in the role of podestà by Ettore Malinverni, who held the post until 1940. As for municipal infrastructure, from 1935 to 1938 sewers were built in the streets of the town center, while in 1937 paving, in porphyry cubes, was laid in some town streets.

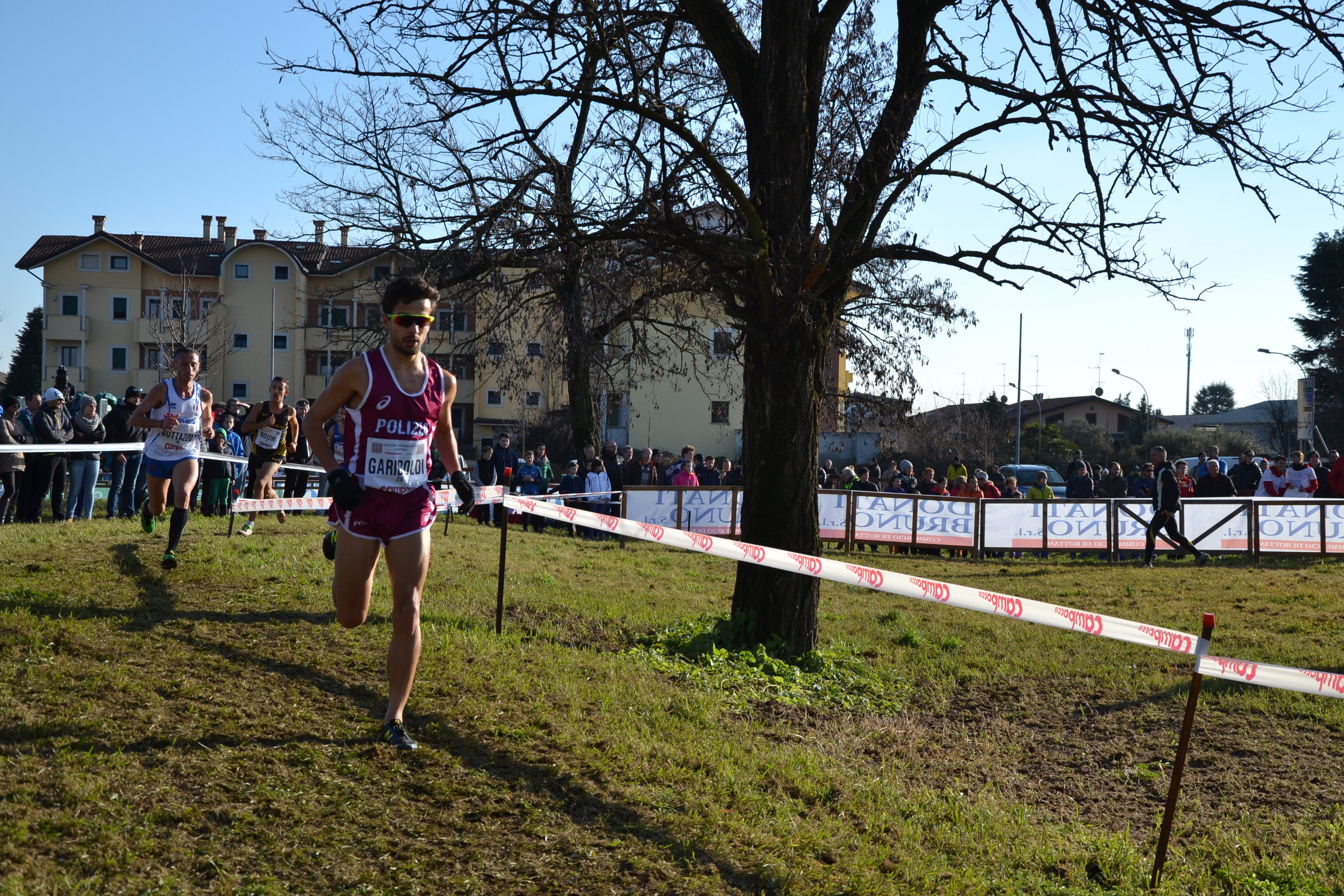
Campaccio

With the outbreak of World War II, San Giorgio was also affected by wartime events. Prominent among them were the actions of Giacomo Bassi, municipal secretary who arrived in San Giorgio in 1942. During his tenure Bassi hid a family of Milanese Jews in the elementary school of San Giorgio (today's City Hall), procuring false identity documents for them and providing continuous moral and material assistance for fifteen months until the Liberation. For this reason he was proclaimed a Righteous Among the Nations by the State of Israel. Several citizens of San Giorgio took part in the conflict, many of whom never returned home because they were killed or went missing at the war front. In total, from 1935 to 1945 (thus including the Ethiopian War) 42 military personnel from San Giorgio died on the battlefields (30 soldiers, one rifleman, one corporal, three corporal majors, two sergeants, one sergeant major, one marshal, one lieutenant, one airman of the first class, and one torpedo submarshal). Following the armistice of September 8, 1943, the Italian Armed Forces disbanded, and many soldiers of the Royal Army were interned in concentration camps in Germany. Among them, there was also a soldier from San Giorgio. In this tragic scenario, two soldiers from San Giorgio were involved in the massacre of Cephalonia. One of them was interned and died in a concentration camp in Germany, while the other perished during the sinking of the ship that brought him as a prisoner to the Teutonic country. After the armistice of September 8, 1943, numerous citizens of San Giorgio participated, as part of the Altomilanese partisan formations, in the Resistance. The most famous partisan from San Giorgio is Pino Croci, who died while delivering an order to the CNL in Legnano. A street in San Giorgio was later dedicated to him.

With the end of the war and the final fall of Fascism, pre-dictatorship administrative positions were restored in San Giorgio as well. In 1945 Orazio Peretti was temporarily appointed mayor by the CNL. He remained in office until the election of the first mayor democratically elected by the citizens of San Giorgio after the dictatorship, Mario Pastori, in office from 1946 from 1947.

The second half of the 1950s was marked by two important events in the history of San Giorgio. The first event was the granting, on January 7, 1956 by decree of the President of the Republic signed by Giovanni Gronchi, of the coat of arms and banner of the municipality. The second event was the organization by the Unione Sportiva Sangiorgese of the first edition of the Campaccio (1957), an annual cross-country race in which internationally renowned athletes participate. It is one of the most important events of its kind in Italy; for this reason, too, the Unione Sportiva Sangiorgese was awarded the gold star for sporting merit in 1988. The name of the race is derived from Campasc, which means "uncultivated field" in the dialect of Legnano.

At the turn of the 1950s and 1960s there was the golden age of industry in San Giorgio, mainly related to the textile and mechanical industries. In the decades that followed there was a slow decline caused by competition from textiles from developing countries. The crisis got progressively worse, damaging the economy, employment and the industrial fabric: many companies closed, especially in the textile, clothing and footwear sectors, and many others were involved in a downsizing process. Such processes continue to this day. Agriculture, marginal in its impact on the production system, is practiced in the few areas free of construction and infrastructure. These lands are cultivated with cereals, mainly wheat and corn. San Giorgio su Legnano, like the entire surrounding area, is still among the most developed and industrialized areas in Italy.

On October 1, 1967, the school complex housing the middle school was inaugurated. The building stands on an area that was previously occupied by the boys' oratory, which later moved to Via Manzoni. Later, the men's oratory was moved to the new parish center on Via Roma, which was inaugurated on January 13, 1982 by Cardinal Carlo Maria Martini.

On December 10, 2006, San Giorgio su Legnano hosted the 2006 European Cross Country Championships, which were organized by the Unione Sportiva Sangiorgese.

== Image gallery ==
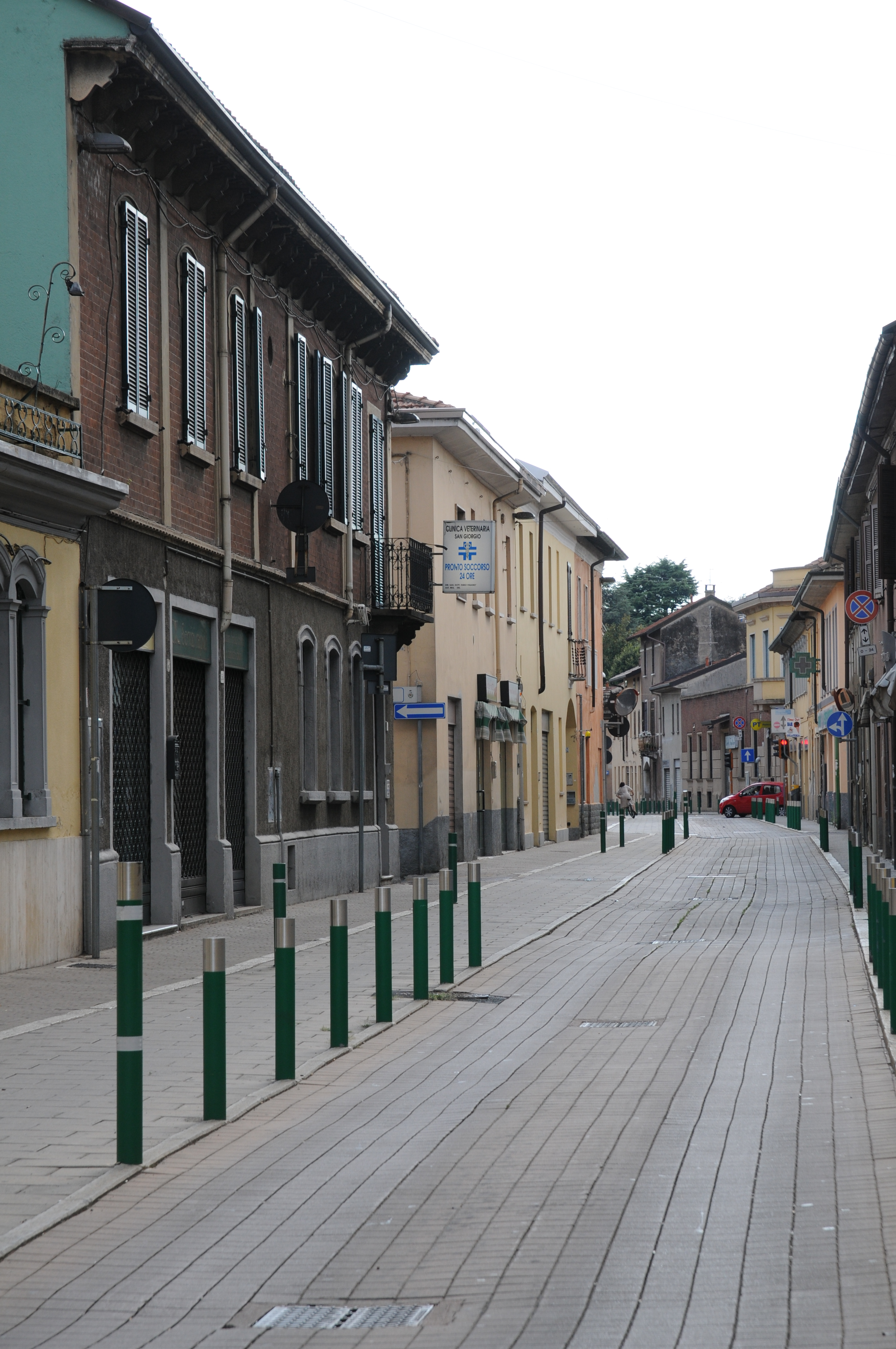
Roma Street

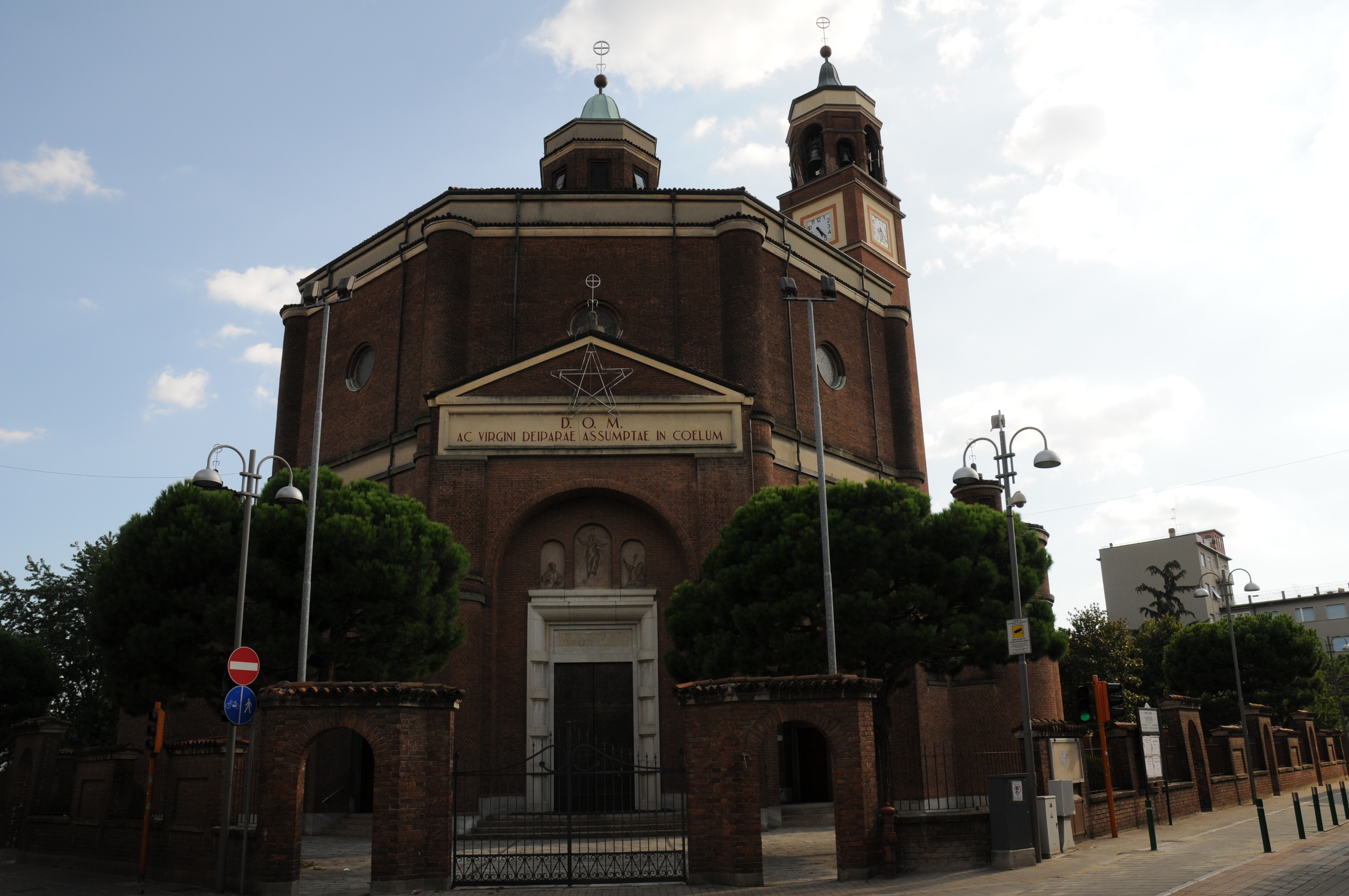
Parish Church

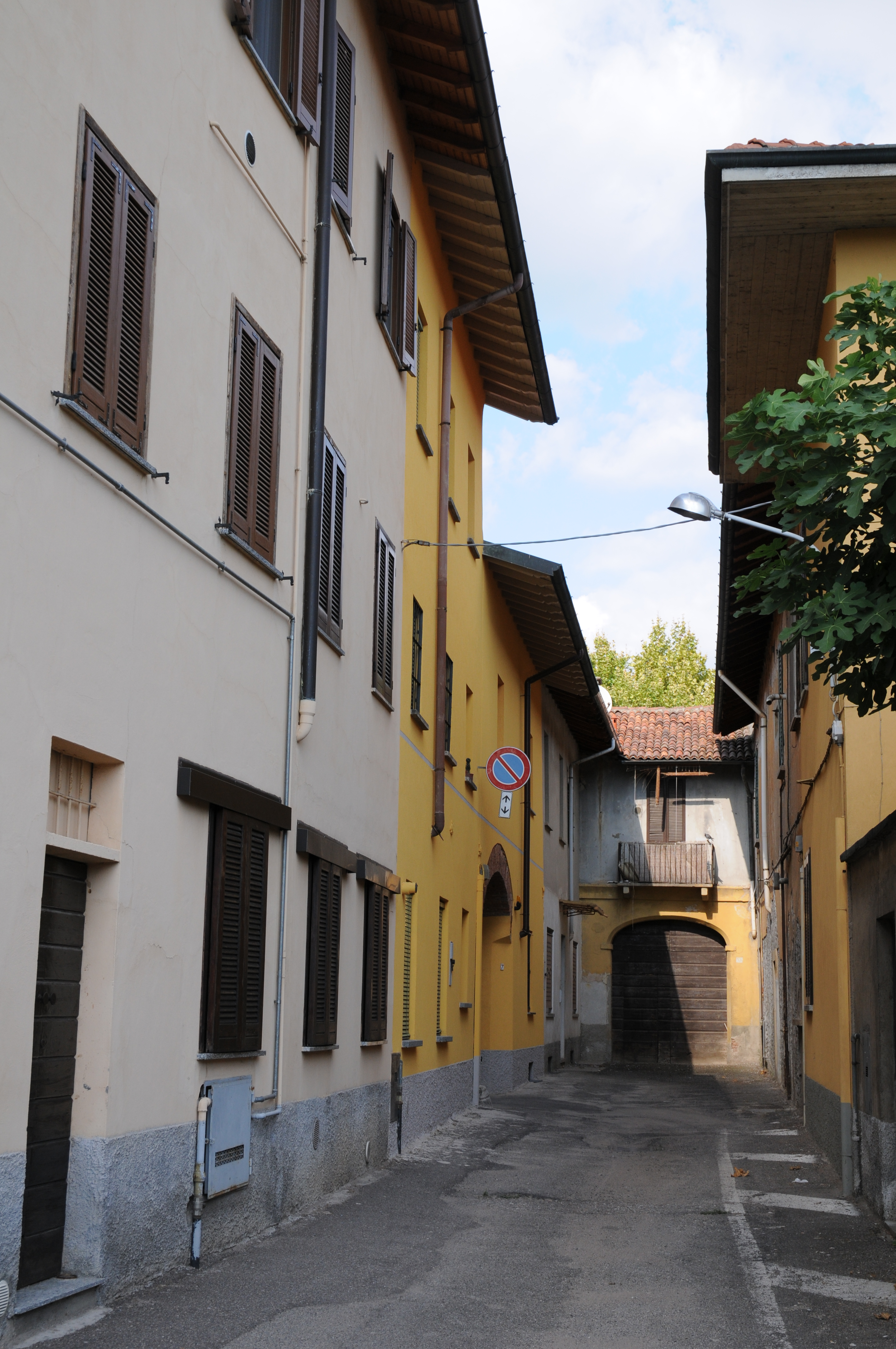
Parravicini Alley

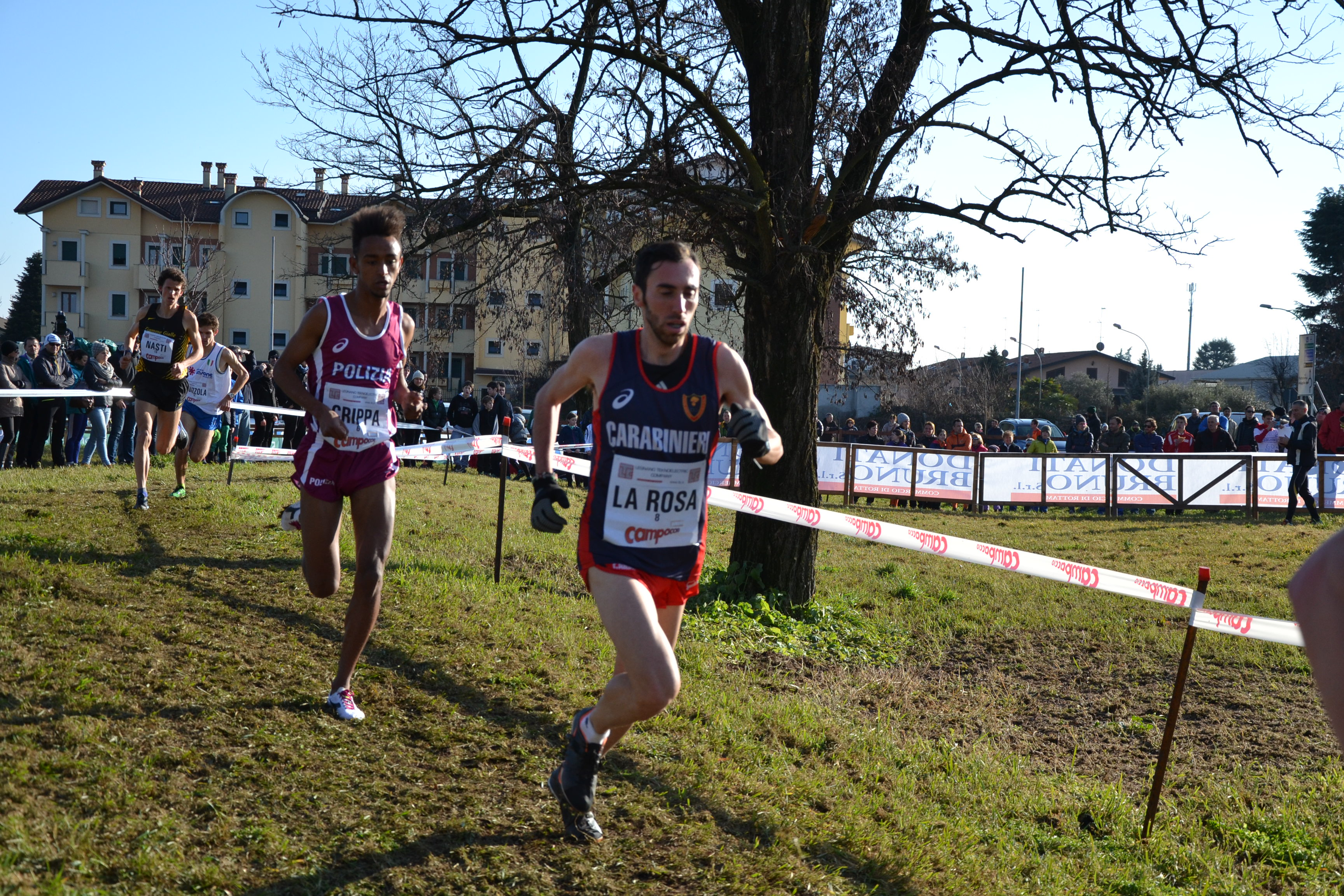
Campaccio

== See also ==
- Lombardy

== Bibliography ==
- Agnoletto, Attilio (1992). San Giorgio su Legnano - storia, società, ambiente.
- Various authors (2015). Il Palio di Legnano : Sagra del Carroccio e Palio delle Contrade nella storia e nella vita della città. Banca di Legnano.
- D'Ilario, Giorgio; Egidio Gianazza, Augusto Marinoni, Marco Turri (1984). Profilo storico della città di Legnano. Edizioni Landoni.
- Di Maio, Paola (1998). Lungo il fiume. Terre e genti nell'antica valle dell'Olona. Corsico: Teograf.
- Percivaldi, Elena (2009). I Lombardi che fecero l'impresa. La Lega Lombarda e il Barbarossa tra storia e leggenda. Ancora Editrice.
- Guido Sutermeister (1940). Il castello di Legnano - Memorie n°8. Tipografica Legnanese.
