= Bailleur =

A bailleur, a French term, is a landowner who outsourced uncultivated parcels of land as part of an early Middle Age sharecropping system known as complant — a precursor to the métayage system. Under this system, a laborer known as a prendeur would agree to cultivate land owned by the bailleur in exchange for ownership of the crop and its production. For use of the bailleur's soil, the prendeur promised a share (normally a third to two-thirds) of the crop's production or its revenue to the bailleur. The length of this partnership varied, and would sometimes extend over generations.
