= Prendeur =

A prendeur, a French term, is a labourer working as part of an early Middle Age sharecropping system known as complant, a precursor to the métayage system. Under this system, the prendeur would cultivate land owned by a bailleur. In exchange for using the bailleur's soil, the prendeur promised a share of the crop or its revenue. The length of this partnership varied and sometimes would extend over generations.
