= Beata Vergine Assunta, San Giorgio su Legnano =

Church in Milan, Italy

Beata Vergine Assunta
- Chiesa della Beata Vergine Assunta
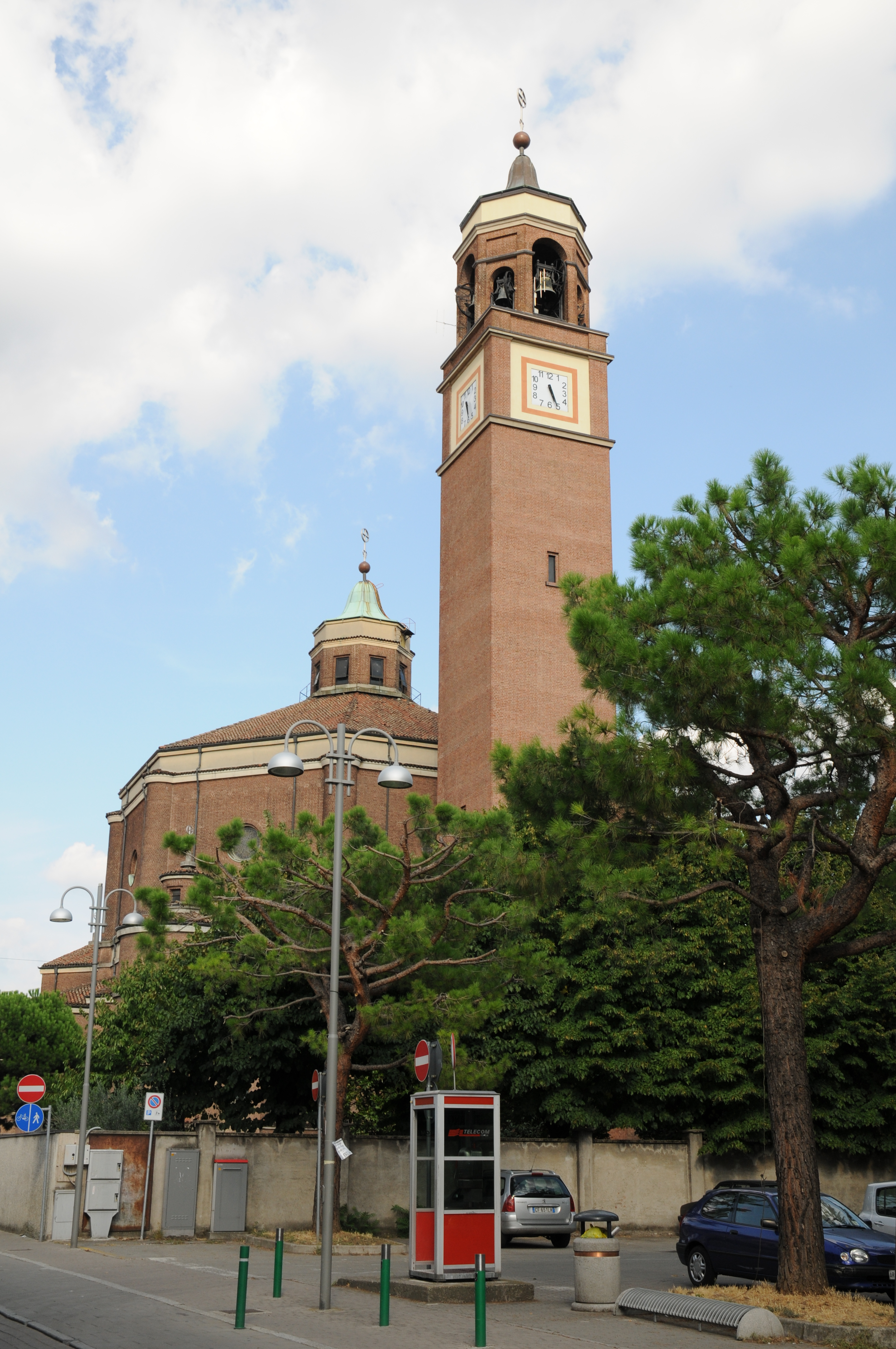
- The church of the Beata Vergine Assunta of San Giorgio su Legnano

Map location and basic information
Location in Italy
Religion
Affiliation	Roman Catholic
Province	Archdiocese of Milan
Rite	Ambrosian Rite
Location
Location	San Giorgio su Legnano, Italy
Coordinates	45°34′34.43″N 8°54′41.11″E
Architecture
Style	Renaissance Revival
Groundbreaking	March 3, 1933
Completed	April 23, 1935

Website
- www.parrocchiadisangiorgio.com

Beata Vergine Assunta is the parish church of San Giorgio su Legnano, a municipality in the Metropolitan City of Milan, in Lombardy. Dedicated to the Assumption of Mary, it was consecrated on April 23, 1935. It has a Neo-Renaissance style and is characterized by a central plane of Bramante derivation.

== Architecture ==
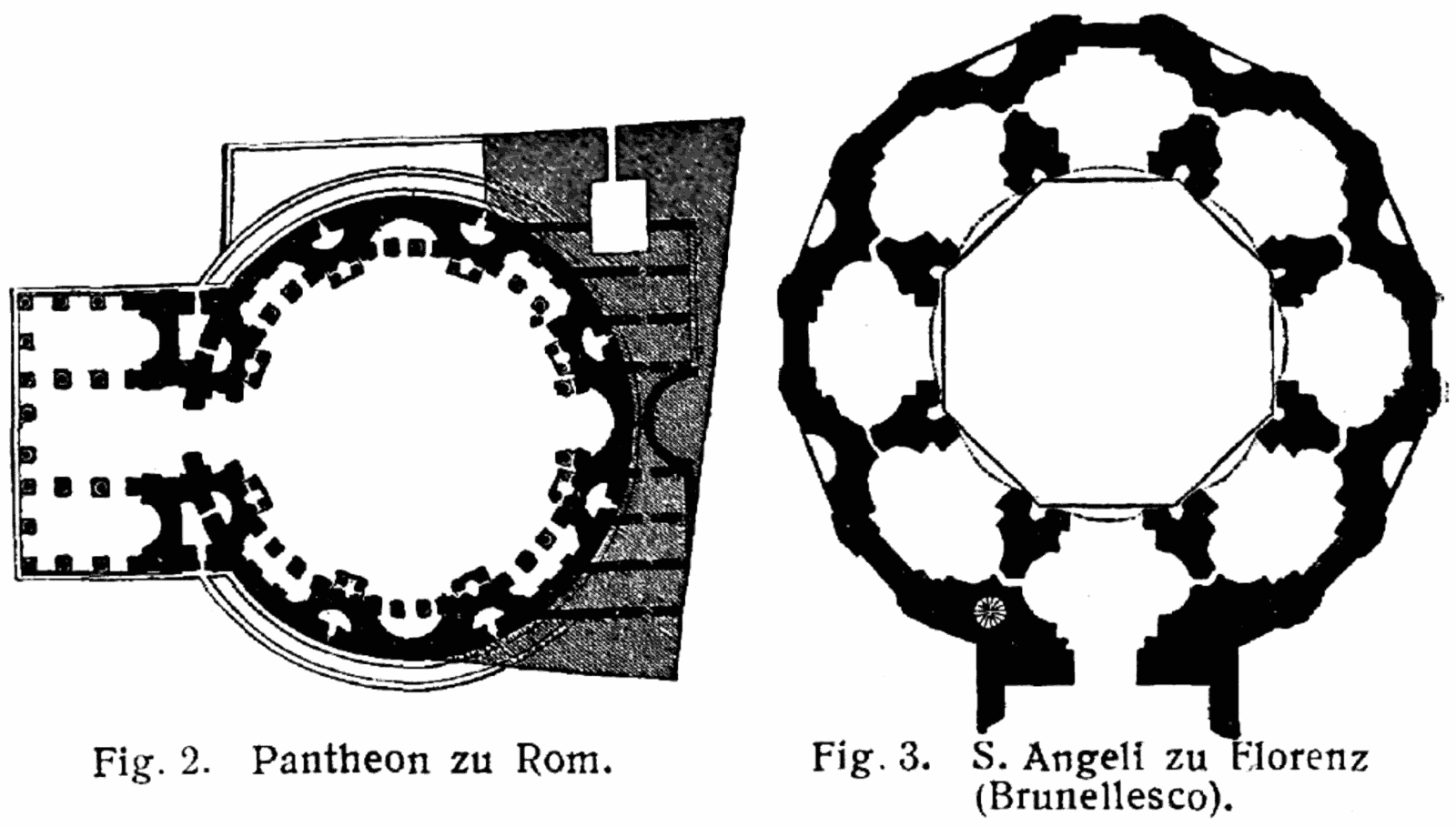
Comparison of the Pantheon in Rome (left) and Rotonda del Brunelleschi in Florence plants, two of the most famous examples of central plan

The building, which has a Neo-Renaissance style, has a central octagonal plan of Bramante derivation with a dome-shaped roof with a lantern. From the study of volumes to the detriment of the setting of the architectural project based on spaces, which is typical of central-plan architecture, and the church of the Blessed Virgin Assumed is not an exception, a perspective view descends where no part is predominant over the other: this pushes the observer not to definitively stop looking at any specific part of the architectural work.

Designed by the architect Ugo Zanchetta of Milan and dedicated to the Assumption of Mary, it was strongly desired by don Pietro Ermolli (1888-1972), parish priest of San Giorgio su Legnano from 1928 to 1969. The construction work lasted from 3 March 1933 to October 1934, with the first stone laid on 24 April 1934 and the consecration which took place on 23 April 1935.

Another peculiarity of the church of the Beata Vergine Assunta is the use of exposed bricks, which are typical of Lombard constructions. On the eight sides of the church there are six side chapels (three on each side) and the presbytery, which is surmounted by a hemispherical dome. The two central chapels on the sides, one dedicated to the Sacred Heart and the other to Mary, are increased compared to the others and are closed at the top by a dome with a roof lantern.

The church of the Beata Vergine Assunta has a surface area of 1,700 m^{2} and a height of 38 m. The main dome has a diameter of 30 m, while the bell tower has a square base of edge 6.5 m and a height of 55 m.

== Artistic works ==
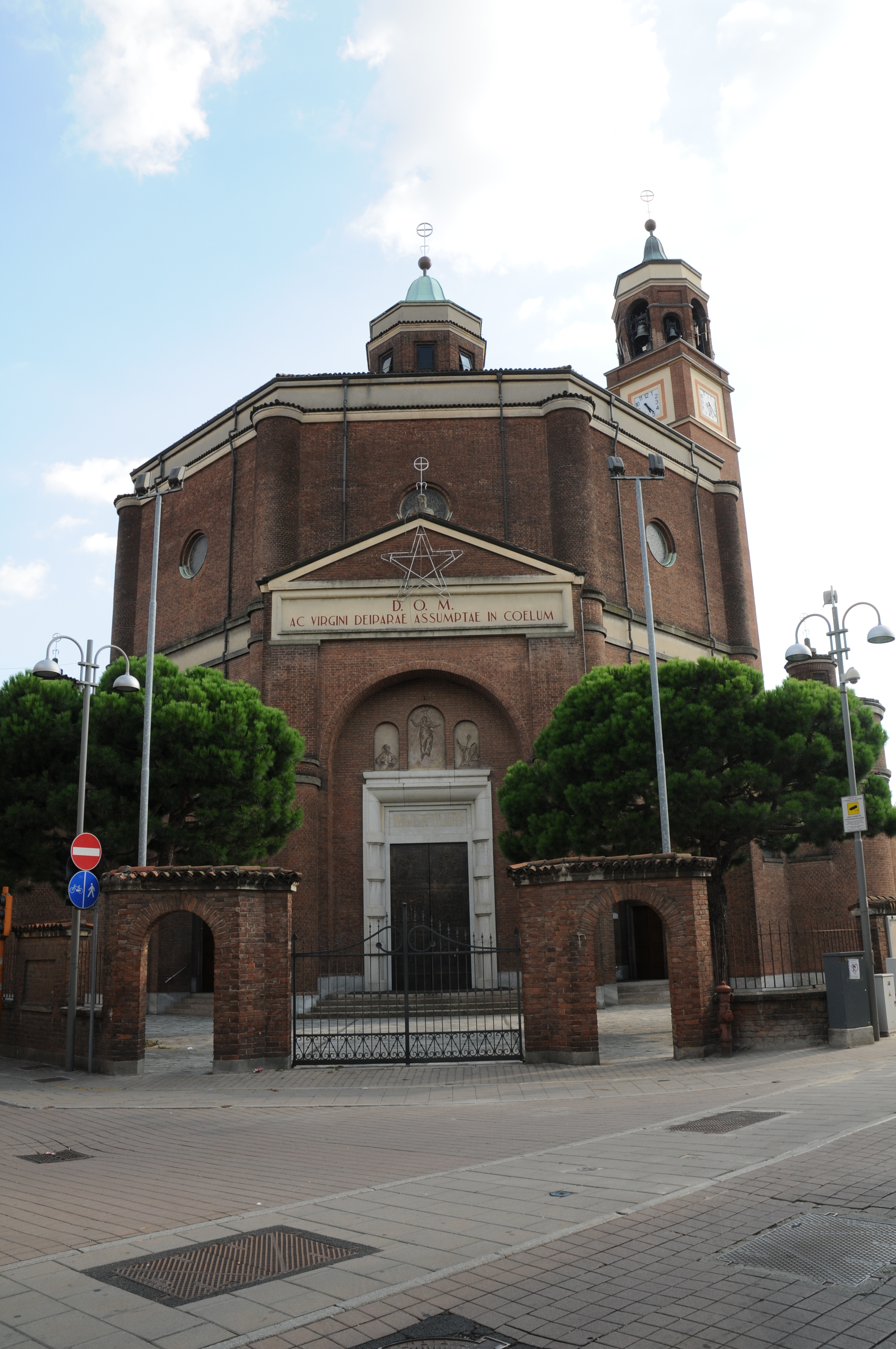
Facade of the church of Beata Vergine Assunta

In the church there is an ancient neoclassical altar of the mid-nineteenth century once used in the old parish church of the Beata Vergine Assunta. It is located in a side chapel, in the so-called Chapel of the Blessed Sacrament, which is located to the left of the main chapel. The displacement of this altar was one of the consequences of the Second Vatican Council which foresaw, among other things, a liturgical reform that sanctioned the displacement of the altars in the direction of versus populum (en. "Towards the people"), or on faithful side: until then all the sacred tables were in fact oriented versus Deum (in it. "towards God"), or on the opposite side, in the direction of the Holy Land, with the priest facing east and with the faithful behind.

The main altar was made in 1973 by the sculptor Gino Casanova following the dictates of the Second Vatican Council. It consists of a single block of yellow-roan marble that weighs 12 tons and that has dimensions 3 x 1.40 x 1 m. Along its perimeter some episodes from the life of Jesus are depicted: frontally the Crucifixion of Jesus, the Resurrection of Jesus and the Ascension of Jesus while laterally the Presentation of Jesus at the Temple and some scenes concerning the apostles. On the back are carved The Wedding at Cana, the Raising of Lazarus and the Miraculous catch of fish.

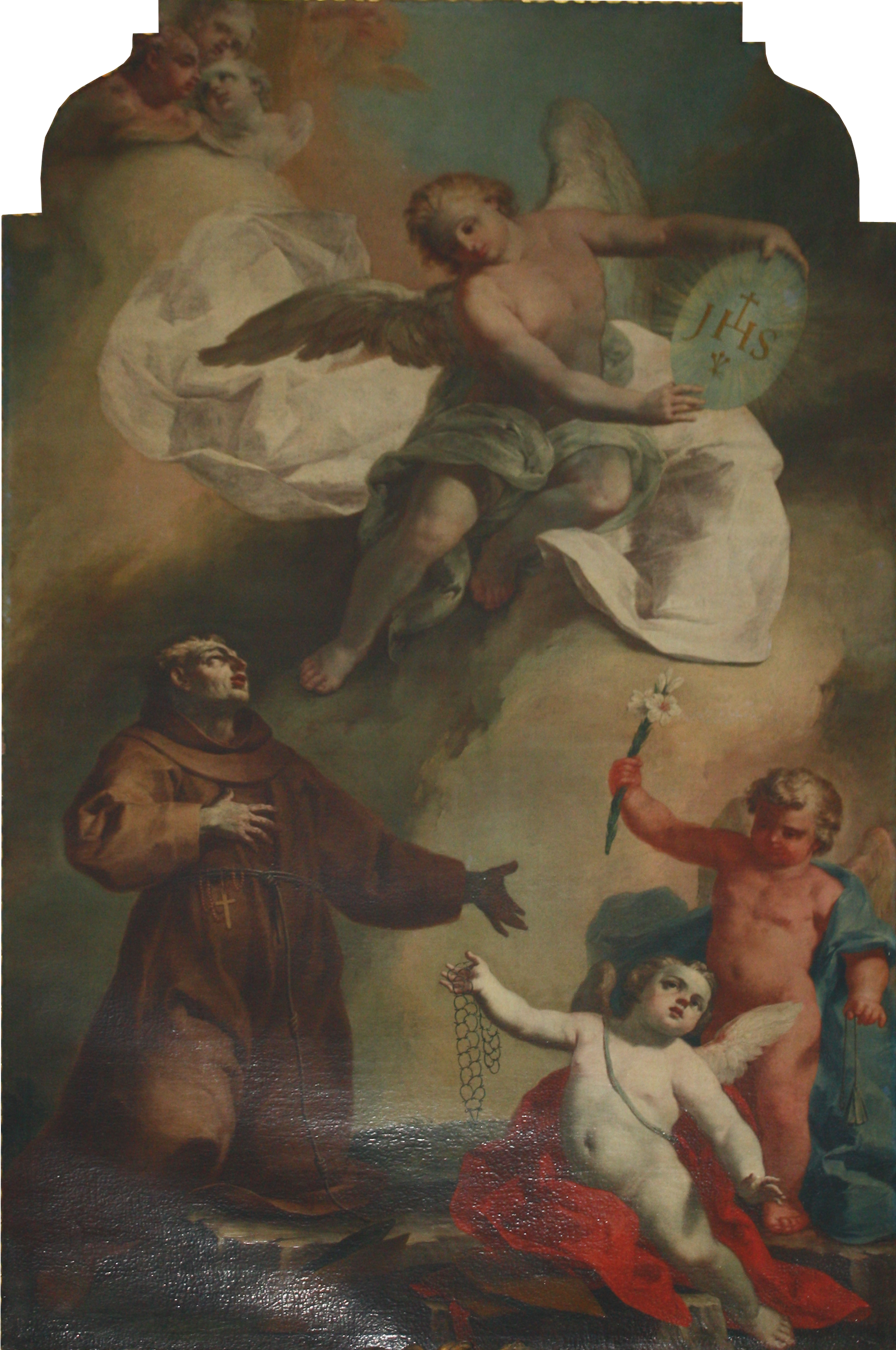
18th century altarpiece by Biagio Bellotti preserved in the church of the Beata Vergine Assunta

Among the works in the side chapels, an eighteenth-century altarpiece by Biagio Bellotti stands out, representing Bernardino of Siena and which was once kept in the old parish church. The organ, which dates back to 1850 and was built by the Portinari family from Magenta, also comes from the old church of the Beata Vergine Assunta.

On the pillars there are 14 bronze panels from 1935 that depict the Via Crucis. The floor, which was built between 1942 and 1943, consists of marble tiles that form a mosaic connected to the Marian symbolism. The baptistery was decorated in 1966 with a mosaic style recalling Fra Angelico.

On the apse there is a mosaic made up of 700,000 pieces and made in 1975 by the painter Mario Cornali of the Accademia Carrara of Bergamo and of the mosaicists Toniutti brothers of Bollate which depicts Jesus, Mary and eleven saints during the apocalypse. Among the saints, there are saint Peter, saint George, saint Francis, saint Rita and Pope John XXIII.

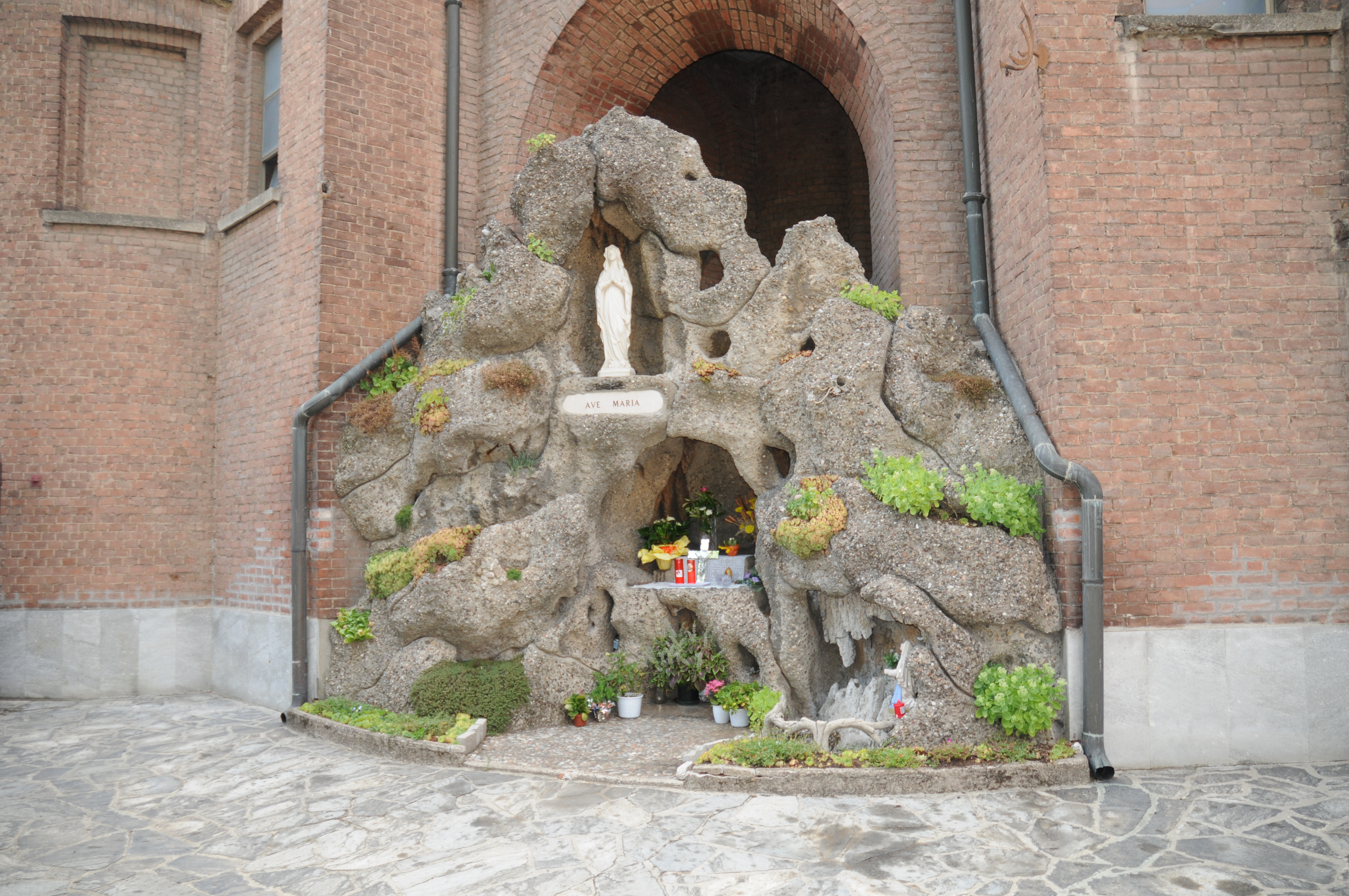
The "cave" of the church of the Blessed Virgin of the Assumption

The entrance door, which is from 1981, was built by the sculptor Ferrari of Ponte di Legno. The door is in iron and steel covered with bronze panels: the external part is decorated with representations that represent scenes of life of Mary. In the same year are the six copper panels that are placed inside the building and represent as many biblical scenes: the Baptism of Jesus, The Wedding at Cana, the evangelical beatitudes, the Healing the paralytic at Bethesda and the Samaritan woman at the well.

The windows of the dome and chapels are from 1984. Those of the chapels, which are made of shatterproof glass and which were made by the Grassi company in Milan with the technique of the "great fire", represent the symbols of the Eucharist in the Catholic Church. The seven round glass windows of the dome are in glass-cement and have a geometric design created on the design of the painter Normanni.

The mosaics of the walls that are located above the side chapels and the main entrance were made from 1985 to 1987 by the mosaic artists, the Toniutti brothers, based on a design by the painter Fumagalli. The spaces that house the mosaics consist of a main frame and two smaller side panels. They represent, starting from the right of the high altar, the appearance of the risen Jesus to the Mary Magdalene, the Crucifixion of Jesus, saint Bernardino, the coming of Christ at the end of the world, the baptism of Jesus, the Assumption of Mary and the Last Supper.

The main dome, which has an area of 1,400 square meters, was painted from 1999 to 2000 by the artist Valentino Vago di Barlassina with scenes from the apocalypse.

== See also ==
- History of San Giorgio su Legnano
