= Masoro =

Masoro may refer to:

- West African Pepper
- Masoro, Rwanda
