= Bentinho Massaro =

Dutch spiritual leader (born 1988)

- Born: 13 March 1988 (age 38); Amsterdam, Netherlands
- Occupations: Spiritual teacher, author, speaker
- Years active: 2010 - present
- Website: bentinhomassaro.com

Bentinho Massaro (born 13 March 1988) is a Dutch cult leader whose teachings manipulate elements of New Age philosophy, self-realization and non-dualism. He primarily uses social media and other online platforms, such as Trinfinity Academy, to spread his message.

Some of his teachings have been said by anti-cult activists to use basic non-duality teachings to manipulate people in his organization. Massaro has been criticised for safeguarding failures on his retreat grounds and has been accused of sexual abuse by former members. Massaro admitted to followers that he tortured a cat when he was a teenager and was diagnosed with narcissistic personality disorder.

== Early life ==
Massaro was born in Amsterdam, in the Netherlands.

Massaro traces his interest in spirituality and human potential to his childhood. His parents enrolled him in the Silva Method children's course. As a teen, he studied telekinesis and claims to have mastered the ability to move small objects. He also read The Law of One (The Ra Material) and the Yoga Sutras of Patanjali. After high school, he travelled to Rishikesh, India, where he trained in yoga, meditation and satsang. After about six months, he had what he would later refer to as an "awakening", the experience of the nondual state of consciousness he had been looking for. Massaro returned to his parents' home in Amsterdam and began posting YouTube videos about his experience.

== Career ==
In 2011, Massaro was invited to the United States to speak at the Science and Nonduality Conference. He moved to Boulder, Colorado, and launched Trinfinity Academy, a free online spirituality course, and bentinhomassaro.tv, a subscription-based collection of his talks. In addition, he began offering in-person retreats around the world.

Massaro's stated goal is a fully enlightened society by 2035.

Massaro has been the subject of significant media scrutiny and criticism. He has promoted 9/11 conspiracy theories. In 2017, while participating in Massaro's retreat in Sedona, Arizona, an individual left the retreat grounds and died by suicide. Massaro was informed of the death by the Sedona Police Department, and no charges were filed.

In February 2022, three former members of Massaro's team, including a former romantic partner of his, broke their non-disclosure agreements (NDAs) and published a blog accusing him of heading a cult that featured a pattern of "psychological and spiritual warfare" and calling him "a predator, hiding in the mask of a messiah". This included financial exploitation and being coerced into having sex with Massaro in order to be spiritually cleansed of trauma. Massaro denies the claims. "All sexual relations I've ever had were fully consensual, and always will be. No one is or is ever forced to do anything against their will. Not by me and not by my team." Another accused member of Massaro's organization also denies the claims. A recent podcast series by NXIVM whistleblower Mark Vicente has interviewed several former members of Massaro's inner circle in which text messages from Massaro show patterns of using his position to sexually manipulate female followers, including his claim that he has a magical penis that can enlighten women.

Dutch journalist Ivo van Woerden investigated Massaro over several years and published the book In de greep van de goeroe ("Under the Spell of the Guru") in 2026.

== Bibliography ==
- Super Accelerated Living: How to Manifest an Epic Life, Trinfinity Publishing, 2016, ISBN 978-0-692-80530-5
- Spiritual Conversations with a Skeptic: On God Consciousness and The Absolute, Bentinho Massaro, 2020, ISBN 978-0-578-64924-5
- Timelessly Free: Quotes for Every Day of the Year, Independently published, 2022, ISBN 979-8-8178-1824-6
