= Paul Masseron =

French civil servant (born 1950)

- Born: 3 April 1950; Landerneau, Finistère, Brittany, France
- Occupations: Prefect (France); minister (Principality of Monaco)

Paul Masseron (born 3 April 1950) is a French civil servant (prefect) who was a minister of the Principality of Monaco.

== Early life and education ==
Paul Masseron was born on 3 April 1950.

He is a graduate of Institut d'études politiques de Paris (IEP Paris).

== Career ==
- 1974-1976 : École nationale d’administration (promotion Guernica)
- 1977-1981 : sub-prefect of Ussel (one of the arrondissements of Corrèze department) in Ussel.
- 1985-1987 : directeur général of the services of the general council of Corrèze.
- 1987-1989 : prefect of Corrèze in Tulle.
- 1989-1993 : prefect of Orne in Alençon.
- 1993-1998 : prefect of Allier in Moulins.
- 1998-2001 : prefect of Vendée in La Roche-sur-Yon.
- 2001-2004 : prefect of Haut-Rhin in Colmar.

In 2006 he became (ordonnance souveraine of 5 April 2006 of prince Albert II of Monaco) a minister of the principality of Monaco, with the title of conseiller de gouvernement pour l’Intérieur i.e. counsellor for internal affairs, member of the Council of Government and chief of the Military of Monaco.

== See also ==
- Arrondissement of Ussel
- Military of Monaco

Political offices
Preceded by	France Prefect of Corrèze; 1987–1989	Succeeded by
Preceded by	Prefect of Orne; 1989–1993	Succeeded by
Preceded by Éric Degremont	Prefect of Allier; 1993–1998	Succeeded by Philippe Grégoire
Preceded by Pierre Mirabaud	Prefect of Vendée; 1998–2001	Succeeded by Jean-Paul Faugère
Preceded by Dominique Dubois	Prefect of Haut-Rhin; 2001–2004	Succeeded by Michel Guillot
Political offices
Preceded by Philippe Deslandes	Monaco conseiller de gouvernement pour l’Intérieur (Council of Government); 2006–	Succeeded by still holding
