= Metayage =

Cultivation of land for a proprietor by one who receives a proportion of the produce

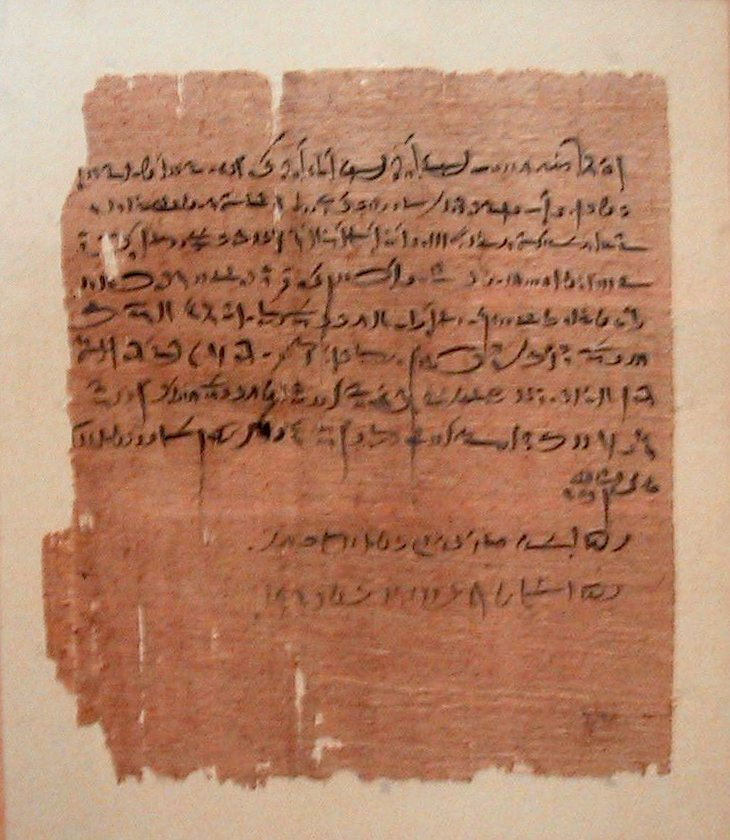
Contract for metayage, papyrus, 35th year of Amasis II (533 BC, 26th Dynasty)

The metayage (Note: UK: /ˌmeɪteɪˈ(j)ɑːʒ, ˌmɛt-/, US: /-təˈj-/; French: métayage [metɛjaʒ]; Spanish: mediería [meðjeˈɾi.a]; Italian: mezzadria [meddzaˈdriːa], literally, halving in all three languages.) system is the cultivation of land for a proprietor by one who receives a proportion of the produce, as a kind of sharecropping. Another class of land tenancy in France is named fermage, whereby the rent is paid annually in banknotes. A farm operating under métayage was known as a métairie, the origin of some place names in areas where the system was used, such as Metairie, Louisiana.

== Origin and function ==
Métayage was available under Roman law, although it was not in widespread use. It proved useful after the emancipation of Roman slaves as the newly freed peasants had no land or cash (the same phenomenon happened in Brazil and the US when slavery was banned).

In what is now northern Italy and southeastern France, the post Black Death population explosion of the late Middle Ages, combined with the relative lack of free land, made métayage an attractive system for both landowner and farmer. Once institutionalized, it continued into the 18th Century, although the base causes had been relieved by emigration to the New World..

Métayage was used early in the Middle Ages in northern France and the Rhinelands, where burgeoning prosperity encouraged large-scale vineyard planting, similar to what the ancient Romans had accomplished using slave labor. The hyperinflation that followed the influx of Incan-American gold made Métayage preferable to cash tenancy and wage labour for both parties. Called complant, a laborer (in French prendeur, in Italian mezzadro) would offer to plant and tend to an uncultivated parcel of land belonging to a land owner (in French bailleur, in Italian concedente). The prendeur would have ownership of the vines and the bailleur would receive anywhere from a third to two-thirds of the vines' production in exchange for the use of his soil. This system was used extensively in planting the Champagne region. Bailleur was also used as the name for the proprietor under métayage. The contract still exists today in Switzerland.

In the eighteenth century c. 75% of leased lands in western, southern and central France were sharecropped. North of the Loire it was only common in Lorraine.

In Italy and France, respectively, it was called mezzadria and métayage, or halving – the halving, that is, of the produce of the soil between landowner and land-holder. Halving didn't imply equal amounts of the produce but rather division according to agreement. The produce was divisible in certain definite proportions, which obviously must have varied with the varying fertility of the soil and other circumstances and did in practice vary so much that the landlord's share was sometimes as much as two-thirds, sometimes as little as one-third. Sometimes the landlord supplied all the stock, sometimes only part – the cattle and seed perhaps, while the farmer provided the implements; or perhaps only half the seed and half the cattle, the farmer finding the other halves. Thus the instrumentum fundi of Roman Law was combined within métayage. Taxes were also frequently divided, being paid wholly by one or the other, or jointly by both.

In the 18th Century, métayage agreements began to give way to agreements to share profits from the sale of the crops and to straight tenant farming, although the practice in its original form could still be found in isolated communities until the early 20th Century. By 1929, there were still 200,000 Métayers, farming 11% of French cultivated land (same % in 1892). It was most common in Landes and Allier (72% and 49% respectively). As the métayage practice changed, the term colonat partiaire began to be applied to the old practice of sharing-out the actual crop, while métayage was used for the sharing-out of the proceeds from the sale of the crops. Colonat partiaire was still practised in the French overseas departments, notably Réunion, until 2006 when it was abolished.

In France, there was also a system termed métayage par groupes, which consisted of letting a sizeable farm not to one métayer but to an association of several who would work together for the general good under the supervision of either the landlord or his bailiff. This arrangement got past the difficulty of finding tenants having sufficient capital and labour to run the larger farms.

In France, since 1983, these métayage and similar farming contracts have been regulated by Livre IV of the Rural Code.

== Localities ==
The system was once universal in certain provinces of Italy and France, and survived there in places until the end of the nineteenth century. Similar systems formerly existed in Portugal, Castile, and in Greece, and in the countries bordering on the Danube. It is tracked to this day in statistics of the European Commission. Métayage was used in French colonies, particularly after the demise of slavery. Also, because of its utility métayage spread to nearby British colonies such as Nevis, St. Lucia and Tobago. It still occurs in former French possessions, particularly in Madagascar. In the Congo the system is used in the vicinity of Kahuzi-Biéga National Park as a means to protect the natural environment. In Mexico the system is used in animal husbandry.

The term métayage is also applied to modern-day flexible cash leases at least in the nominally common law Canadian province of Ontario, and in 2006 in all of Canada, 13,030 farms occupying 2,316,566ha were counted by Statistics Canada. The same study of metayage found 2,489 farms covering 130,873ha in Ontario. The system was useful in Quebec for most agricultural properties at least as far back as the year 1800, and is still tracked statistically by value in Quebec as "loyer en espèces et à la part (agriculture)". It appears to benefit from favourable tax treatment in Canada, where it is known as "sharecropping". In forestry metayage is the subject of a Government of Canada infosheet, and socio-economic report, and has been the subject in Quebec of recent scholarly research.

== Criticism ==
British writers were unanimous in condemning the métayage system, until John Stuart Mill adopted a different tone. They judged it by its appearance in France, where under the ancien régime all direct taxes were paid by the métayer with the noble landowner being exempt. With the taxes being assessed according to the visible produce of the soil, they operated as penalties upon productiveness. Under this system, a métayer could fancy that his interest lay less in exerting himself to augment the total share to be divided between himself and his landlord and instead be encouraged to defraud the landlord of part of his rightful share. This was partly due to the métayer's relative state of destitution and with the fixed duration of his tenure – without which the metayage could not prosper. French metayers, in Arthur Young's time, were "removable at pleasure, and obliged to conform in all things to the will of their landlords," and so in general they so remained.

In 1600, the landlord Olivier de Serres wrote 'Le théâtre de l'agriculture' which recommends Métayage as cash tenants took all the risks so would demand lower rent while hired labour was expensive to manage. Simonde de Sismondi expressed dissatisfaction in 1819 with the institution of métayage because it reinforced the poverty of the peasants and prevented any social or cultural development.

Although métayage and extreme rural poverty usually coincided, there were provinces in France and Italy (especially on the plains of Lombardy) where the contrary was the case.

== See also ==
- Sharecropping
- Sharefarming
- Tenant farmer
