= City walls and gates of Legnano =

Medieval defensive walls and gates of Legnano, Italy

Walls and urban gates of Legnano
- Mura e porte urbane di Legnano
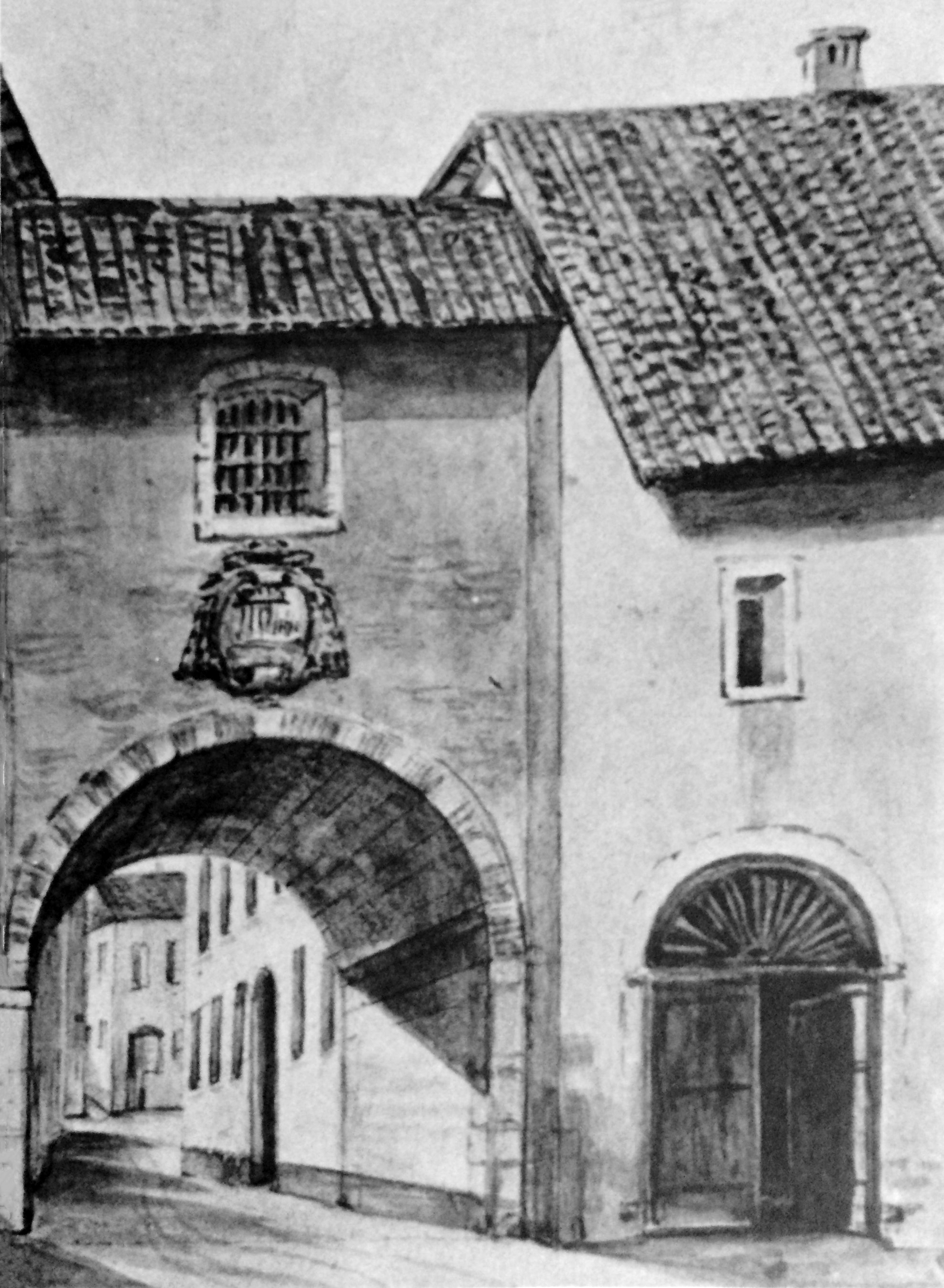
- The Porta di Sotto of Legnano in a 1875 watercolor by Giuseppe Pirovano
- Interactive map of the Walls and urban gates of Legnano area

General information
- Status: Demolished
- Type: Defensive walls
- Architectural style: Medieval
- Location: Legnano, Italy
- Coordinates: 45°35′41″N 8°55′09″E
- Years built: between the 10th and 11th centuries
- Demolished: prior to 1398

The walls and urban gates of Legnano were a constitutive part of a military defensive system serving Legnano, a municipality in the Metropolitan City of Milan, in Lombardy.

Used in the Middle Ages and completed by the Cotta castle, they were one of the protagonists of the Battle of Legnano, an armed clash that took place on May 29, 1176, between the imperial army of Frederick Barbarossa and the troops of the Lombard League led by Guido da Landriano.

== Strategic function of Legnano ==
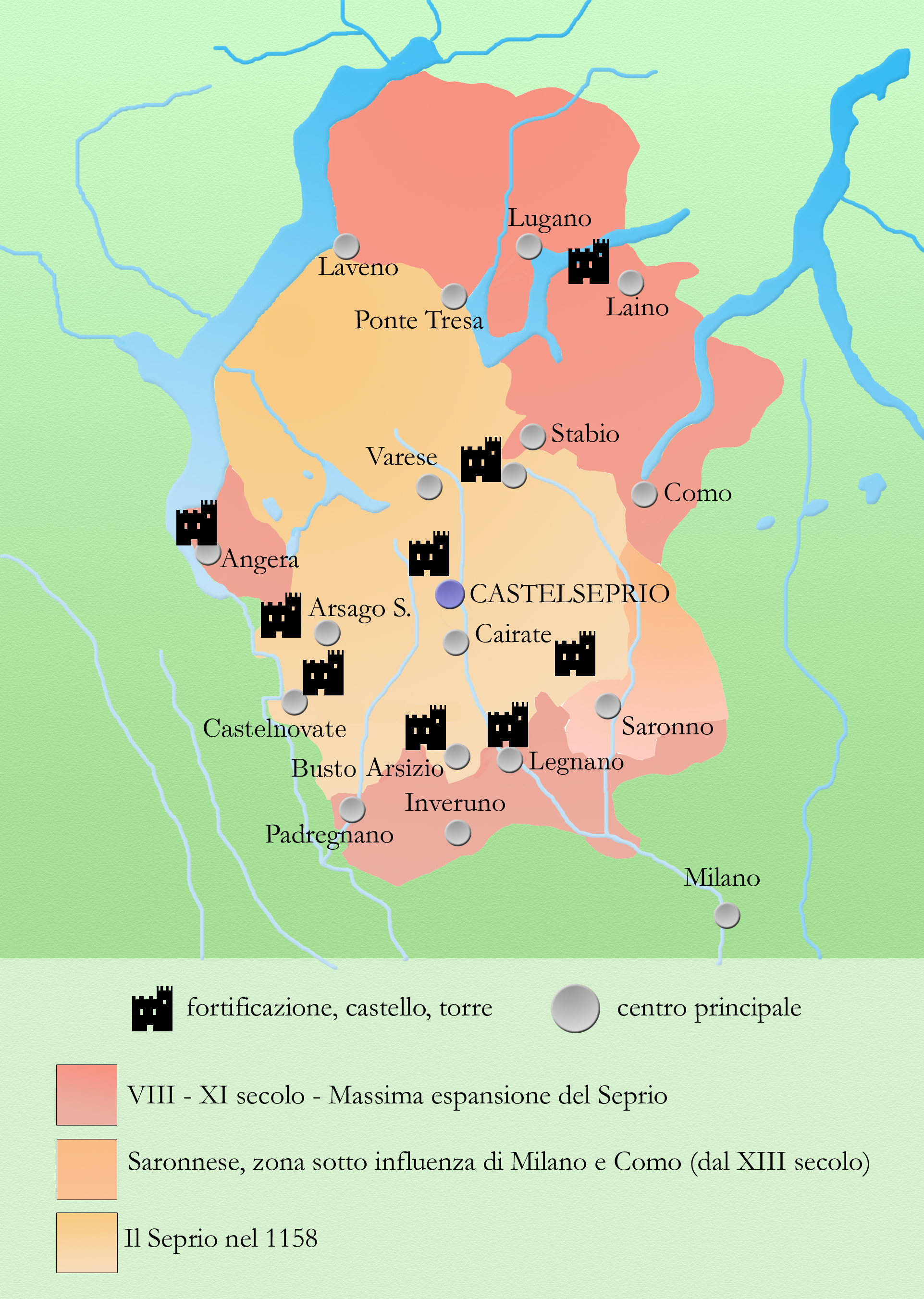
Map of the Seprio

Legnano, from the Middle Ages to the 16th century, was strategically important from a military standpoint: the village was located along an important road that ran alongside the Olona. This communication route, in turn, followed a Roman road built in the 1st century, the Via Mediolanum-Verbannus, which connected Mediolanum (modern Milan) with the Verbannus Lacus (Lake Verbano, i.e., Lake Maggiore). The modern Sempione road, built during the Napoleonic era, follows the route of the ancient road used in Roman and medieval times.

The defense of Legnano was important because its potential conquest could allow Milan’s enemies to easily access the northwestern Milanese contado due to its position at the outlet of the Olona Valley, which ends at Castellanza, and to target the Milanese capital via this road. In the Middle Ages, Legnano, although formally part of the Seprio, gravitated around Milan. The connection between Milan and the city of the Carroccio was not only military but also economic: indeed, Legnano and the other contadi orbiting Milan also supplied part of the foodstuffs produced to Milan.

In the Early Middle Ages, Legnano appeared as a fortified citadel formed by the Church of San Salvatore, the religious building that the Legnano community relied on before the construction of the Basilica of San Magno, the Cotta castle, which was the seat of political power, and a small group of houses gathered around the square in front of the Church of San Salvatore, all enclosed by defensive walls and a floodable moat.

The shape of the early medieval inhabited center of Legnano was still recognizable in the city’s outline drawn on the map of the Theresian Cadastre, created in 1722, while the course of part of the medieval walls can still be identified in the 21st century by following the paths of the modern streets Palestro, Giulini, and Corridoni.

== Defensive system ==
=== Walls and moat ===
Legnano, in the Early Middle Ages, was surrounded by a not very deep and floodable moat that originated at the site of the modern Piazza 4 Novembre and drew water from a derivation coming from a natural branch of the Olona river, the Olonella. Describing a wide perimeter, the moat flowed back into the main course of the river between the modern streets Corridoni and Ratti. Within this initial defensive work, there was a wall about 1 meter thick that ran, for a stretch, parallel to the moat. Besides losing its utility, the moat was later filled in for another reason: it diverted water from the operation of the mills built along the Olona.

Remains of these fortifications and the Castello dei Cotta were found during two excavation campaigns from 1951 to 1954 and in 1955 between the under-construction Galleria di Legnano and an adjacent area slightly further north towards Corso Garibaldi. In particular, regarding the wall, traces of its southern part were found, while no remains of the northern part, which must have been north of the settlement, at the height of the current historic headquarters of the Banca di Legnano and corresponding to the ancient Church of Sant'Agnese, now disappeared, have been discovered.

According to some studies, this defensive system was built between the 10th and 11th centuries: initially, it was likely composed of a wooden palisade, while the creation of the moat and brick walls to defend the settlement might have been carried out in the mid-13th century by Leone da Perego. Alternatively, it may have been built as early as the previous century. Regarding the moat’s construction, a document from the period states:

[...] [was dug] a very large ditch [...] around the place of Legnano to draw water from the Olona from its bed [...]

— 13th-century document attesting to the construction of the moat to defend Legnano

The walls and moat were presumably reinforced by Otto Visconti in the second half of the 13th century. According to other studies, it was Otto Visconti, not Leone da Perego, who built the brick walls.

=== Gates ===
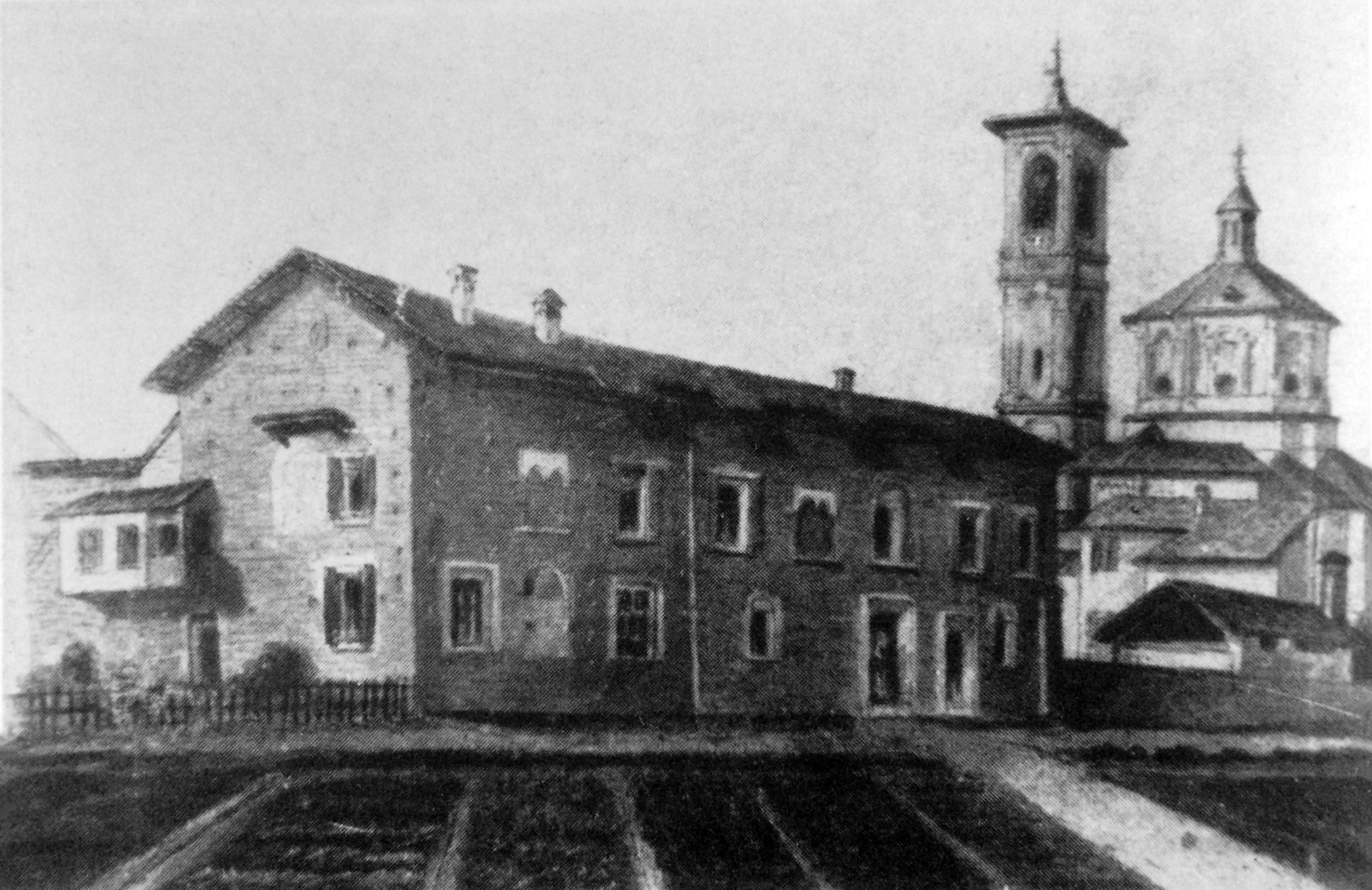
The ancient medieval Palazzo Leone da Perego in a watercolor by Giuseppe Pirovano. In the background, the Basilica of San Magno

The main urban agglomeration of Legnano was developed in an elongated shape following the direction traced by a road that, together with the aforementioned Roman road passing through Legnanello, a separate and independent village from the main settlement of Legnano, constituted the primary communication system with the surrounding area. Legnanello is indeed one of the two original nuclei of modern Legnano. Since medieval times, Legnano was divided into two parts: the larger and more significant agglomeration located on the right bank of the Olona, corresponding to the modern city center (the so-called Contrada Granda, in Legnanese dialect), and a smaller village, Legnanello, on the left bank of the river, along the Olonella. The two inhabited centers later merged into a single urban conglomerate with the building expansion of the 20th century. (Note: See the two topographies of Legnano (dated 1850 and 1904) present in the text Profilo storico della città di Legnano at p. 348 and p. 349.)

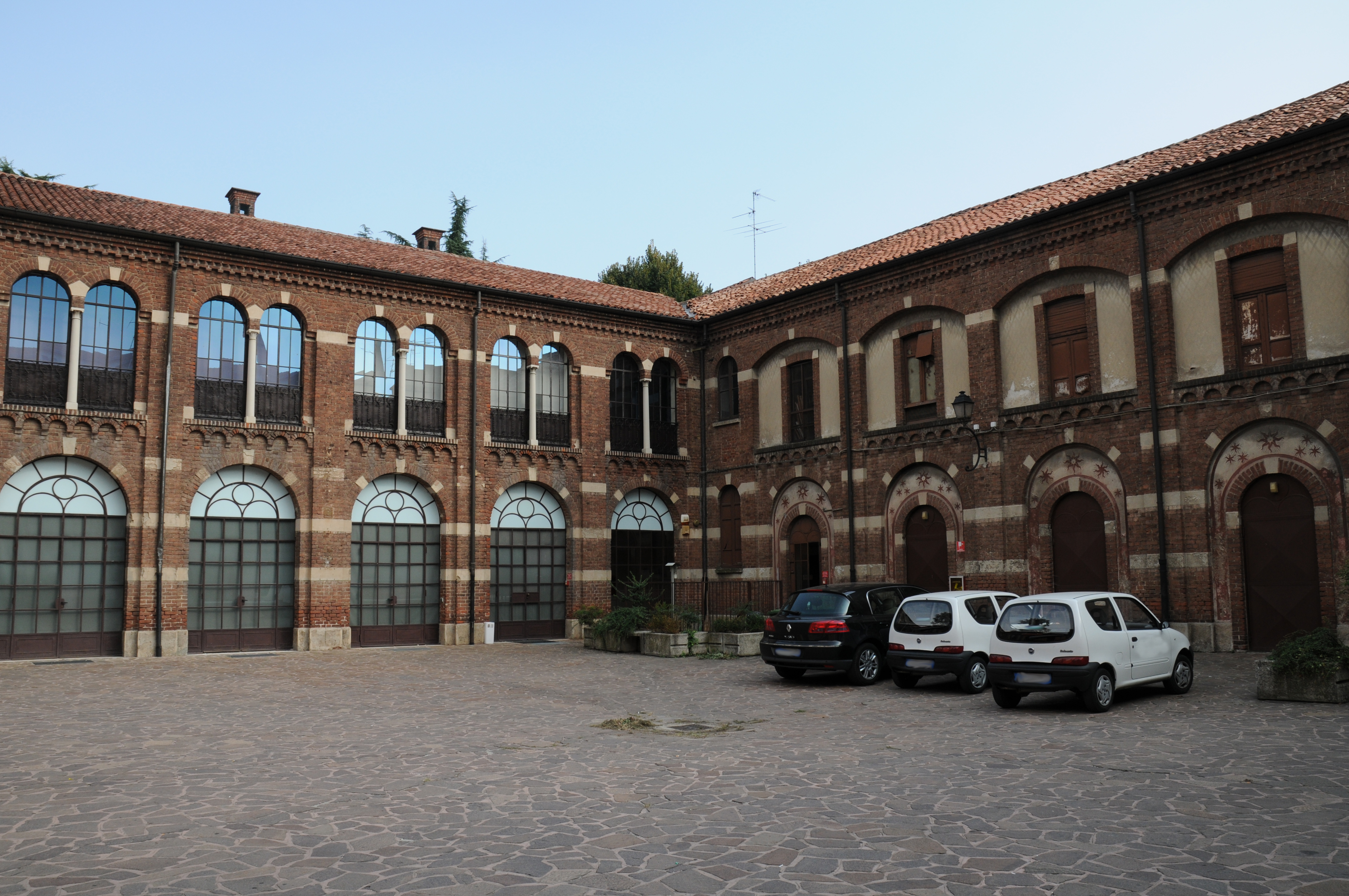
The modern Archiepiscopal Court of Legnano. On the left, Palazzo Leone da Perego; on the right, Palazzo Visconti

The road passing through the main settlement, which also followed the course of the Olona and corresponds to the modern Corso Magenta and Garibaldi, crossed the urban agglomeration from north to south; this road came from the Olona Valley and connected Castellanza, Legnano, the modern Legnano neighborhood of Costa di San Giorgio, and Milan; at the entrance and exit of Legnano, corresponding to the walls, two gates were built, one of which, known as "Porta di Sotto", was demolished in 1818 because it hindered the movement of farmers’ carts.

It was located south of the settlement, forming its southern boundary, approximately halfway along the section of the modern Corso Magenta between Piazza San Magno and Via Giulini, (Note: See the map of Legnano in the text Il Palio di Legnano : Sagra del Carroccio e Palio delle Contrade nella storia e nella vita della città at p. 30.) which at the time was called Via Porta di Sotto, just beyond the entrance to Palazzo Leone da Perego, rebuilt at the end of the 19th century on the remains of a medieval palace of the same name, and near the ancient Castello dei Cotta. The "Porta di Sotto", adorned with a 16th-century fresco, appeared as an arched opening above which a covered passage had been created, connecting the architectural complex formed by Palazzo Leone da Perego and the adjacent Palazzo Leone da Perego to the Castello dei Cotta and – after its demolition – to a building on the opposite side of the modern Corso Magenta.

To the north, there was presumably a "Porta di Sopra", of which, however, no tangible evidence remains, as it was likely demolished at an earlier time. The settlement of Legnano probably did not consist solely of the group of houses enclosed within the walls but also extended beyond, presumably northward, towards the modern Church of San Domenico (Legnano), and westward, towards the modern Church of Sant'Ambrogio.

=== Cotta castle ===
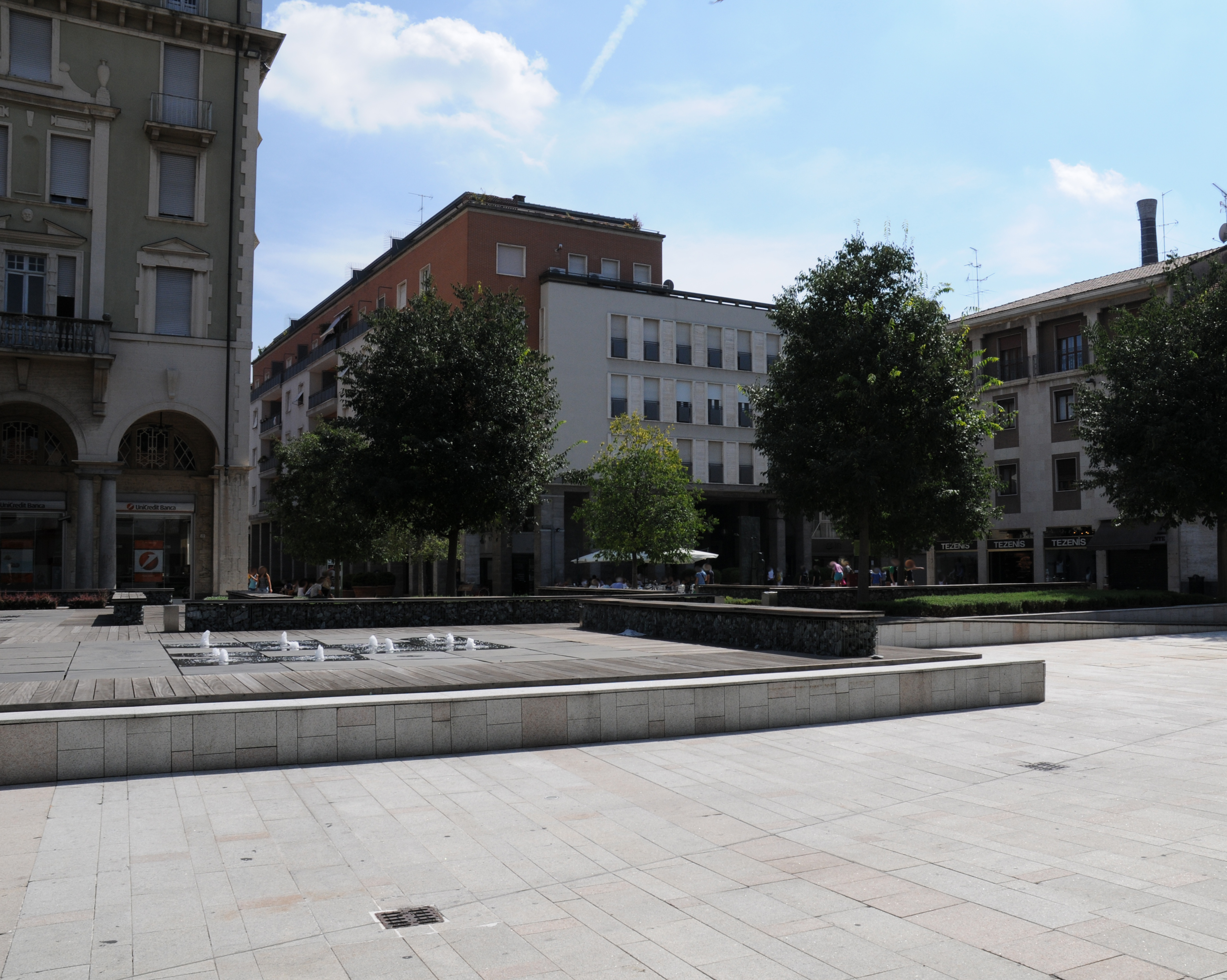
In the background and center, behind the trees, the Galleria INA of Legnano

The Castello dei Cotta, a stronghold guarding the walls and gates of Legnano, was very likely built in the 10th century to counter the raids of the Hungarians. The initial nucleus of the stronghold was presumably a tower for lookout, to which a walled enclosure was added: its structure was thus very simple. In the 11th century, this was completed with the addition of an actual fortified palace. The Castello dei Cotta had a rectangular shape of 22 m by 6.5 m and contained various rooms intended for garrisons and the captain of arms. The Castello dei Cotta later became one of the military outposts used by the Lombard League, led on this occasion by Guido da Landriano, during the Battle of Legnano (May 29, 1176).

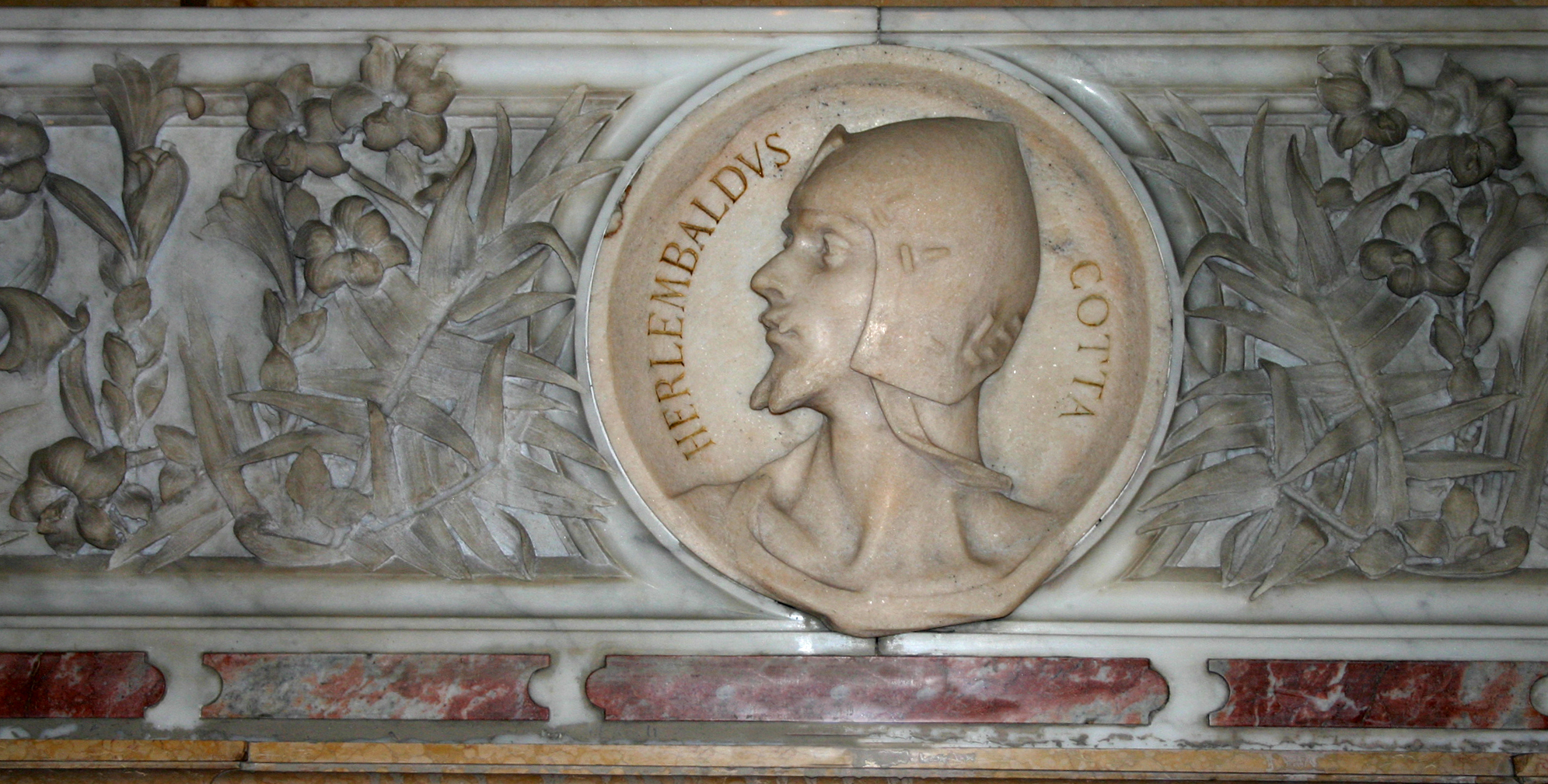
Medallion depicting Erlembaldo II Cotta in the Basilica di San Calimero in Milan

The gradual fortification of the complex was the work of the Cotta family. This family was a vassal of the Archbishop of Milan and participated in the latter’s struggle against the Seprio contado. The first Cotta to settle in the castle in Legnano were Amizio and his son Erlembaldo in 1014. Later, the castle was held by two descendants of Amizio and Erlembaldo, Landolfo and Erlembaldo II.

Subsequently, the Cotta family disappeared from records and chronicles: by the mid-12th century, power over Legnano was exercised solely by the archbishopric. Indeed, a document from July 29, 1148, states that even "Legniano" was within the orbit of the Archbishop of Milan, a prerogative granted by Pope Eugene III.

== Demolition ==
Their demolition is likely attributable to before the 14th century: indeed, from the Notitie Cleri Mediolanensi of 1398, an inventory of religious buildings in the Milanese area regularly compiled by the Church, it appears that the area occupied by the modern Galleria INA, in place of the Castello dei Cotta and the wall, housed the Convento degli Umiliati and the Church of Santa Maria del Priorato, which were demolished in 1953 to make way for the Legnano gallery. The moat, however, existed at least until the 15th century, as testified by the chronicler Bernardino Corio, who described this defensive work as a "very large ditch".

== See also ==
- Battle of Legnano
- Lombardy
- Italy in the Middle Ages

== Bibliography ==
- Agnoletto, Attilio (1992). San Giorgio su Legnano - storia, società, ambiente [San Giorgio su Legnano - history, society, environment] (in Italian).
- Il Palio di Legnano : Sagra del Carroccio e Palio delle Contrade nella storia e nella vita della città [The Palio of Legnano: Festival of the Carroccio and Palio of the Contrade in the history and life of the city] (in Italian). Banca di Legnano. 2015.
- D'Ilario, Giorgio; Egidio Gianazza; Augusto Marinoni; Marco Turri (1984). Profilo storico della città di Legnano [Historical profile of the city of Legnano] (in Italian). Edizioni Landoni.
- Ferrarini, Gabriella; Marco Stadiotti (2001). Legnano. Una città, la sua storia, la sua anima [Legnano. A city, its history, its soul] (in Italian). Telesio editore.
