= Augusto Marinoni =

Augusto Marinoni (Legnano, 15 June 1911 – Legnano, 31 December 1997) was professor of romance philology at the Università Cattolica del Sacro Cuore of Milan, a member of the Commissione Vinciana and the Accademia dei Lincei. He is considered one of the greatest scholars of Leonardo da Vinci.

== Biography ==
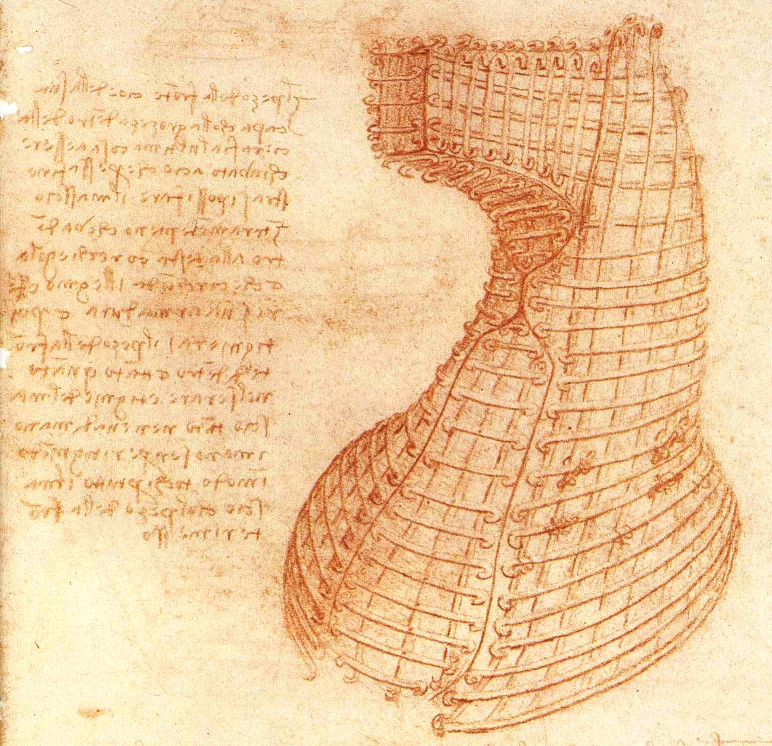
Drawing by Leonardo da Vinci from the Códices Madrid I-II

After completing his classical studies, he enrolled at the Università Cattolica del Sacro Cuore where in 1933 he obtained a degree in Literature and Philosophy. Thanks to the study in lexicography, begun during the preparation of the thesis and continued later, Marinoni was able to identify the genesis, which has its roots in the Middle Ages, of the dictionary.

In 1936 he obtained a chair of Italian and Latin at the Vittorio Veneto High School in Milan. In these years he began studying Leonardo da Vinci, thanks to his knowledge in the lexicographic field. His work in fact initially focused on the eight thousand words contained in the Codex Trivulzianus, and the result of his studies was published by Giovanni Treccani while Marinoni was a prisoner of war (1943-1946) following his participation in the World War II on the front of the North Africa. He resumed his studies on Leonardo in 1952, on the occasion of the 500th anniversary of the birth of the genius from Vinci. Thanks to the quality of his work, he received the applause of the adherents to a congress of Leonardo scholars that took place in Paris in the same year.

In 1958 he was appointed dean of the liceo scientifico of Legnano. Two years later, thanks to Marinoni's initiative, in Legnano a liceo classico with gymnasium was opened in Legnano. Also in 1958 he began to collaborate with the Università Cattolica del Sacro Cuore of Milan, where he taught romance philology until 1981.

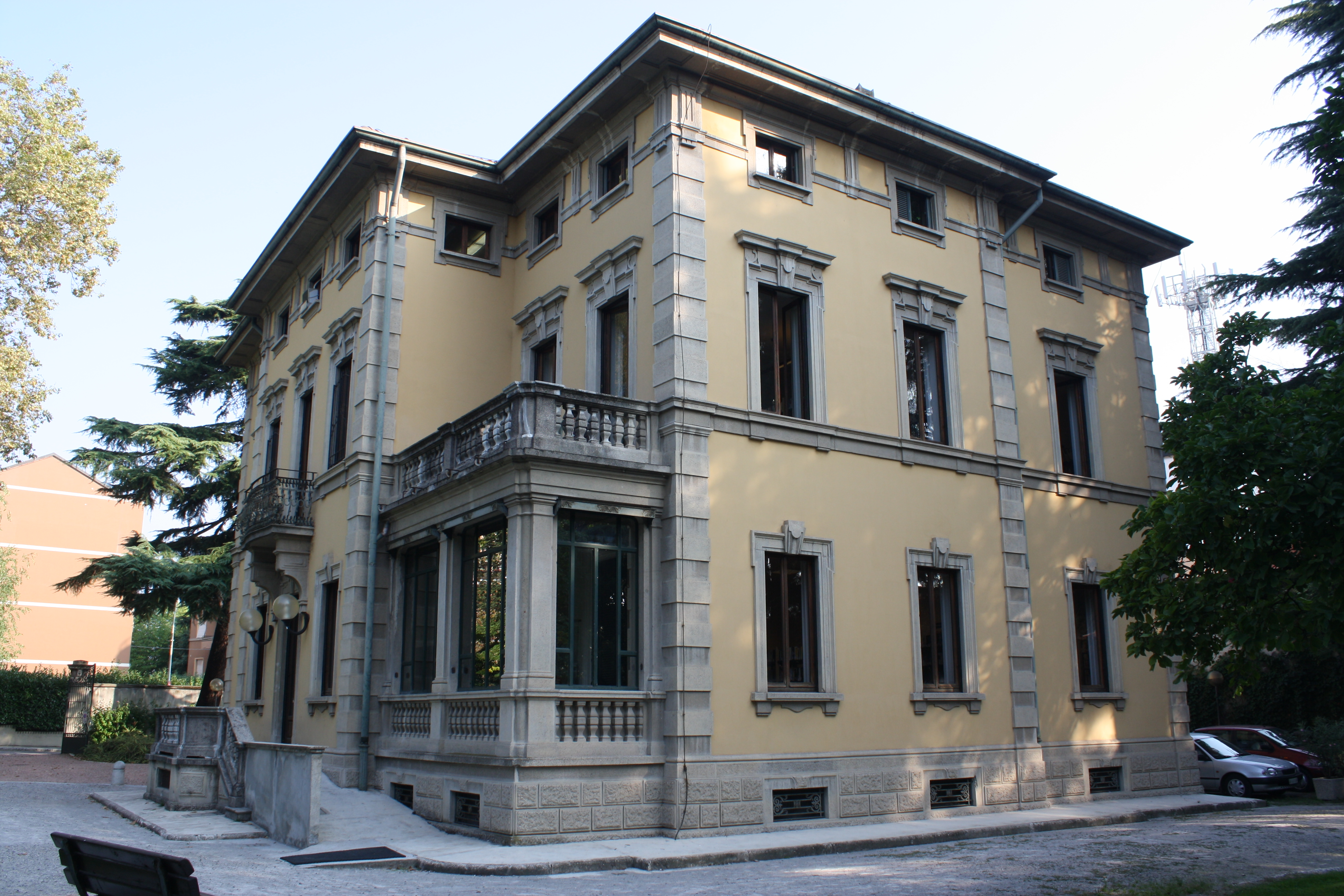
Villa Bernocchi, which houses the municipal library of Legnano, which is named after Augusto Marinoni

In 1968 he was appointed by Giuseppe Saragat, President of the Italian Republic, member of the Ministerial Commission for the edition of the Manuscripts of Leonardo da Vinci. In this commission Marinoni worked on the study, translation and description of the Vincian codes preserved in Italy, namely the Codex Trivulzianus, the Codex Atlanticus and the Codex on the Flight of Birds. Thanks to this immense work, Marinoni published from the seventies all 14 volumes of the codes in question.

In 1972 began the cooperation with Ladislao Reti on the transliteration of the Códices Madrid I-II, discovered in the Spanish capital. In 1974 he dealt with the dissemination of these codes, which were published in seven languages by MacGraw Hill.

Thanks to the quality of his work, Marinoni is considered the greatest connoisseur of the philology of Leonardo da Vinci and the greatest expert of the philosophical and scientific thought of Leonardo. Marinoni continued his studies on Leonardo da Vinci and continued his popular activity, also holding seminars in various European and world cities. In 1982 he published a synoptic on the manuscripts of Leonardo da Vinci named Tavola dei Codici Leonardeschi where Marinoni highlighted Leonardo's debt to the mathematician Luca Pacioli and the copy of the treatise De ponderibus written by Blasius of Parma.

Many companies, such as Philips and IBM, helped publish his work and many world-class cultural institutions invited him to hold seminars and meetings. We owe to Marinoni the creation of the first CD-ROM with multimedia content on Leonardo da Vinci. He studied and in 1977 disclosed the contents of the Codex Forster, preserved at the Victoria and Albert Museum in London, and of the Codex Ashburnham, kept at the Institut de France in Paris. In 1982 he was appointed president of the Commissione Vinciana Authority of Milan, which still brings together the greatest Italian and foreign scholars of Leonardo da Vinci. Among the awards he received, the Hammer "for excellence", obtained by the University of California, Los Angeles, in 1987, should be mentioned.

Augusto Marinoni also studied in depth the history of his city, Legnano, and his dialect. The municipal library of Legnano is named after Augusto Marinoni, which is housed inside Villa Bernocchi.

== Selected publications ==
- Leonardo the Scientist. McGraw-Hill, New York, 1980. (With Carlo Zammattio and Anna Maria Brizio) ISBN 0070727236
