= Church of San Salvatore (Legnano) =

Catholic church in Legnano

- Chiesa di San Salvatore
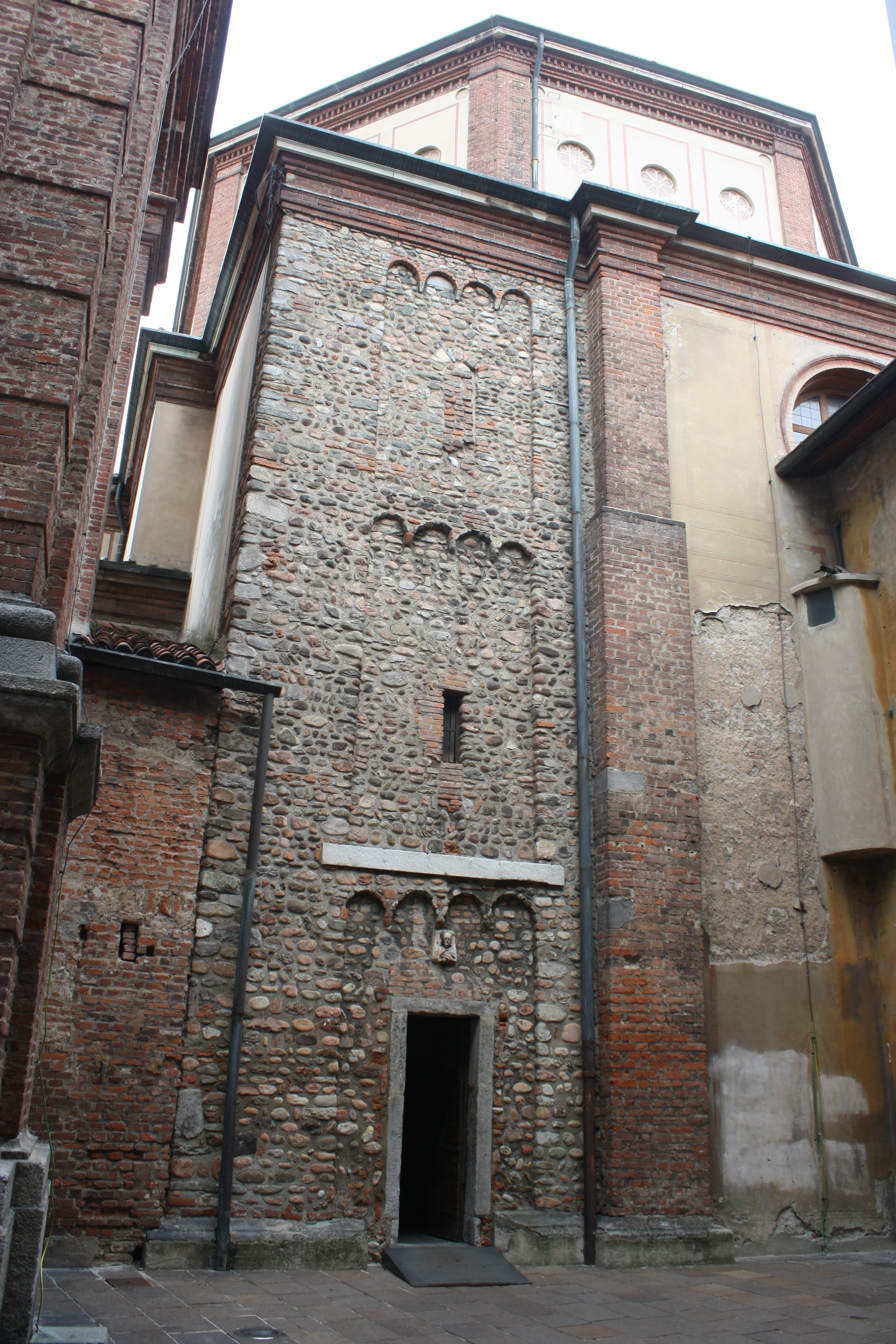
- Remains of the Romanesque bell tower of the ancient Church of San Salvatore, now incorporated into the Basilica of San Magno
- Church of San Salvatore
- 45°35′42.59″N 8°55′8.44″E
- Location: Legnano, Lombardy
- Denomination: Catholic Church
- Sui iuris church: Latin Church
- Tradition: Ambrosian Rite

Architecture
- Architectural type: Archaic Romanesque
- Completed: 10th century
- Demolished: 15th century

Administration
- Archdiocese: Archdiocese of Milan

The Church of San Salvatore was a place of worship for the Catholic community in Legnano. Dedicated to Jesus the Savior, it was built between the 10th century and 11th century and demolished in the 15th century to make way for the Basilica of San Magno. While it remained open for worship, it was the most significant church in Legnano. All that remains of the original Church of San Salvatore is the remnant of its bell tower, now integrated into the Basilica of San Magno.

== History ==
=== Construction ===
Before the Basilica of San Magno, the Legnano community relied on the parish Church of San Salvatore, believed to have been constructed in the 10th or 11th century, according to some studies. The possibility that its construction predates the year 1000 is tied to its dedication to Jesus the Savior, a devotion particularly strong during the Lombard era.

The Church of San Salvatore first appears in historical records in two lists of churches compiled in 1304 and 1389. Another document confirming its existence is dated April 3, 1406, while Legnano's first parish was established later, on December 24, 1482, under the name "Parish of San Magno and San Salvatore". At that time, the cult of Saint Magnus was also deeply felt in Legnano, so much so that the basilica was later dedicated to him, and he became the patron saint of the city.

=== Location ===
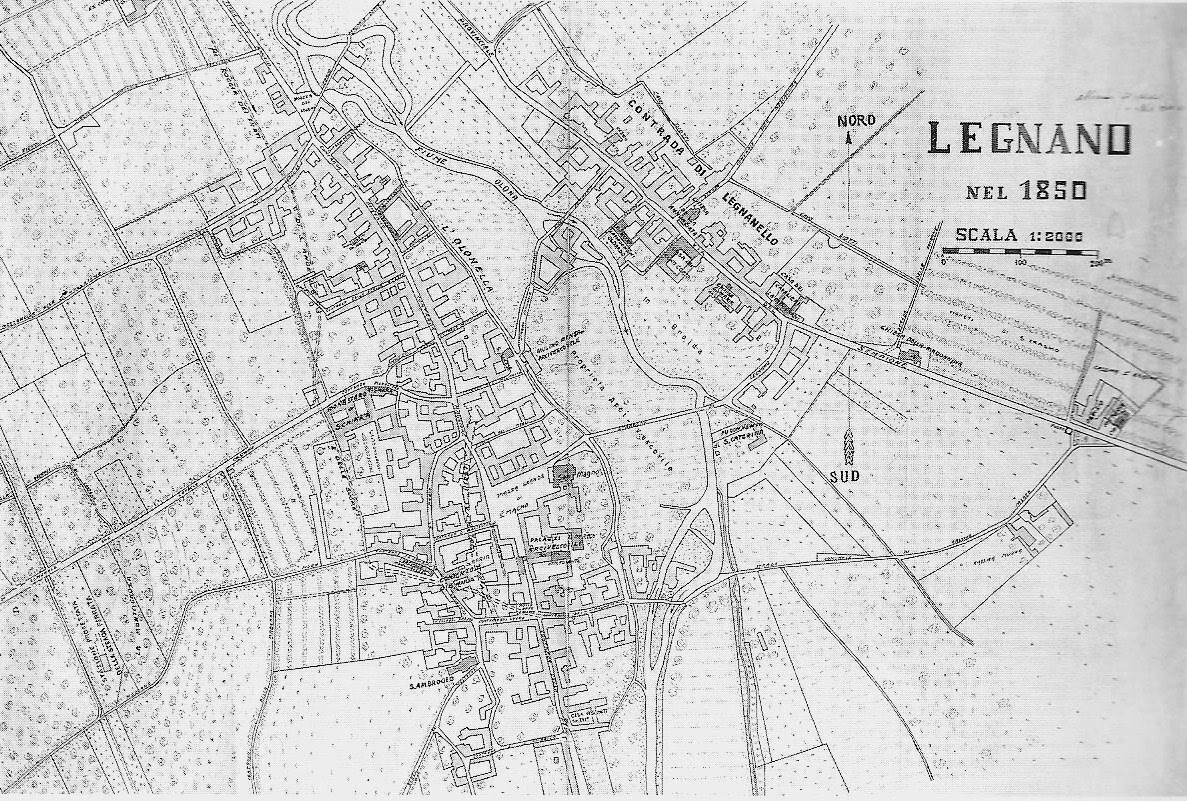
A map of Legnano from 1850, showing the still-distinct settlements of Legnano and Legnanello, separated by the Olona and Olonella rivers

The Church of San Salvatore stood on the same site where the Basilica of San Magno now stands. Its entrance, located to the north, faced a small road leading to the so-called "Braida Arcivescovile," a natural island in the Olona river owned by the Curia, accessible via a bridge crossing the Olonella, a secondary branch of the river that formed the Braida

In the medieval period, Legnano was divided into two parts: the main settlement on the right bank of the Olonella, corresponding to the current city center (known as Contrada Granda in the Legnanese dialect), and a smaller village, Legnanello, on the left bank of the river. The Olonella branched off from the Olona before reaching Legnano and, after passing behind the main settlement near the Church of San Salvatore, rejoined the Olona.

The Olonella was later filled in during the early 20th century. The two settlements eventually merged into a single urban area with the building expansion of the 20th century.

=== The Church ===
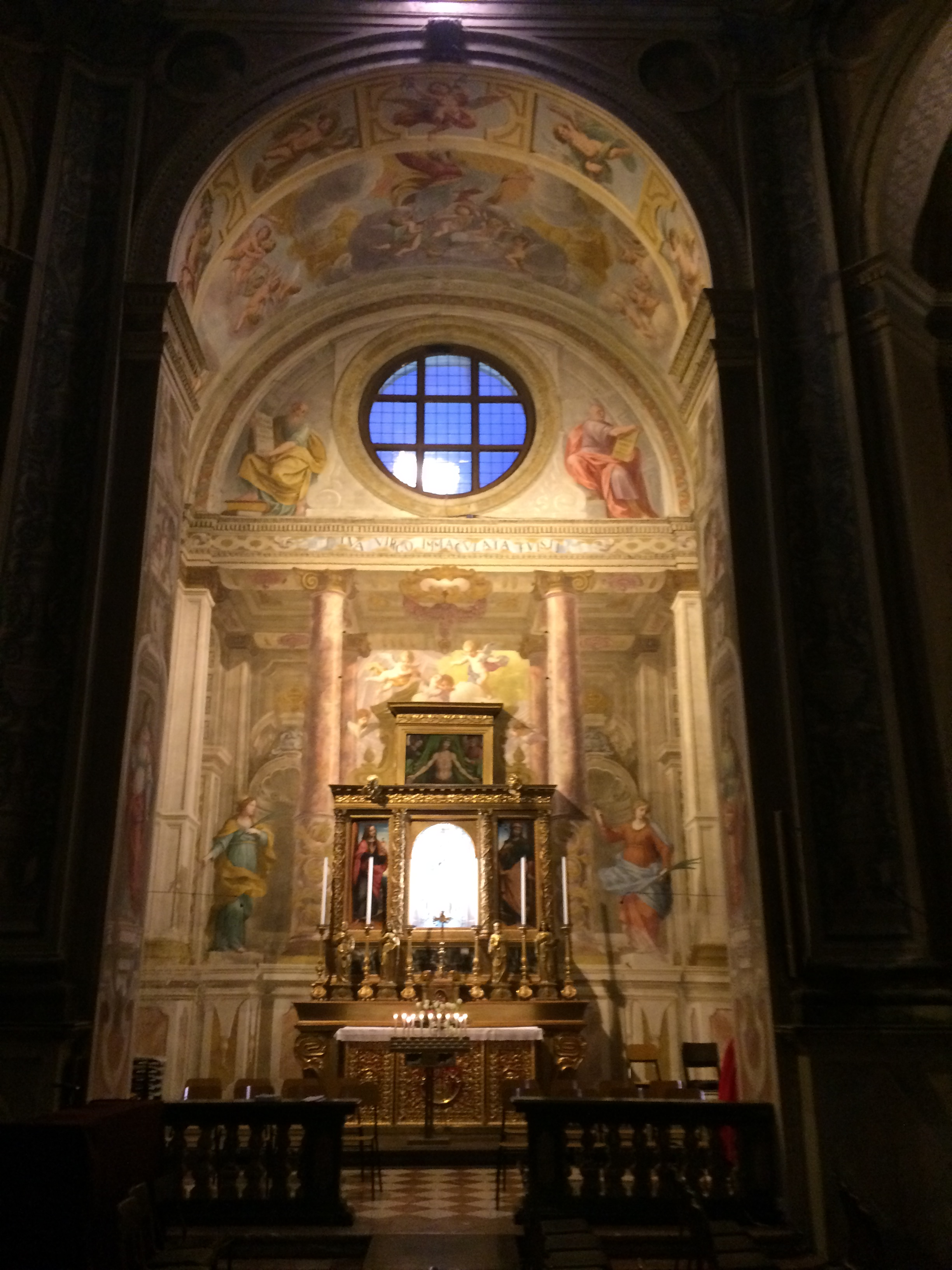
The Chapel of the Immaculate in the Basilica of San Magno, featuring Giampietrino's altarpiece at the center

This religious building, as inferred from the remains of its bell tower now part of the Basilica of San Magno, was constructed in an archaic Romanesque style with walls made of pebbles bound with mortar. Its corners were marked by large squared stones. The Church of San Salvatore had a rectangular layout, with its interior divided into three naves ending in an apse

The walls and the columns separating the three naves were built with stones and lime. The central apse, the main one, was dedicated to Jesus the Savior and Magnus of Milan, which is why this ancient Legnano temple was also known as the "Church of San Salvatore and San Magno".

In the aforementioned 14th-century church lists, there is also mention of the "Church of San Salvatore in canonica".. This religious building had five altars: those of Saint Blaise, Saint John the Baptist, Saints Philip and James, Saint Paul, and Saint Thomas the Apostle. Given the large number of altars, this church played a significant role in Legnano's religious life, likely indicating that the "Church of San Salvatore in canonica" and the Church of San Salvatore discussed here are the same structure

The main body of the church measured 26 meters in length and 18 meters in width. The Church of San Salvatore was oriented north-south, with the apse facing south. Its interior was decorated with frescoes by a painter from the Ottonian period, and the roof was supported by wooden trusses

Of the church's interior furnishings, the only item surviving into the 21st century is a 1490 altarpiece consisting of three panels, created by Giampietrino. Originally placed in the right apse of the old temple,. it now lacks its central section, which depicted a Madonna and Child, replaced by a wooden statue of the Immaculate Conception crushing the serpent. It is preserved in the Chapel of the Immaculate in the Basilica of San Magno

According to two medieval chroniclers, the body of Leone da Perego was buried in the Church of San Salvatore.. However, parish records from San Magno indicate that Leone da Perego was instead buried in the Church of Sant'Ambrogio

=== Demolition ===
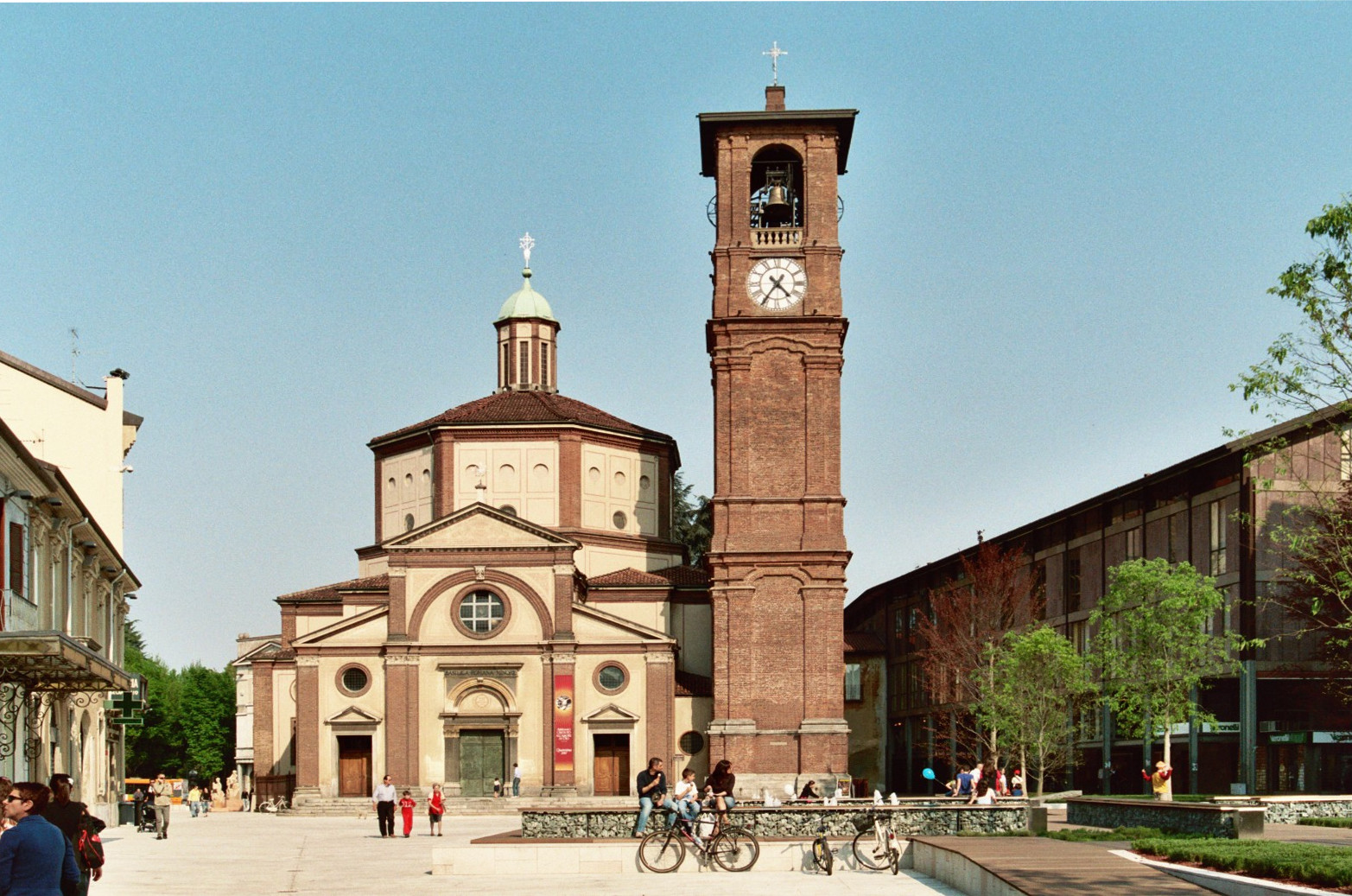
The Basilica of San Magno, which replaced the Church of San Salvatore

By the 15th century, the Church of San Salvatore was plagued by stability issues due to the age of its structures and water seepage from the nearby Olonella.. Frequent flooding from the river further worsened the situation

The church partially collapsed at the end of the 15th century, prompting the people of Legnano to seek permission from the Archbishop of Milan and Ludovico il Moro, Duke of Milan, to demolish the remains and build a new church. As the Church of San Salvatore had a rather simple appearance, the 16th-century residents of Legnano decided to construct a more grandiose temple. By then, Legnano was no longer a modest medieval farming village but a prosperous town, home to many noble families and enriched with numerous stately residences that enhanced its artistic and cultural stature. The Church of San Salvatore had thus become outdated socially and culturally as well.

The foundations of the apse and the bell tower of the old church were preserved. This tower served as the first bell tower of the Basilica of San Magno. It fulfilled this role until 1752, when two-thirds of it collapsed and was replaced by the current structure. The remaining portion was converted into a chapel, still visible behind the current bell tower on the southern side of the basilica, near the covered passageway through the San Magno parish center. These remains are identifiable by a small door and exposed stonework.

== See also ==
- Basilica of San Magno
- Magnus (bishop of Milan)

== Bibliography ==
- D'Ilario, Giorgio; Gianazza, Egidio; Marinoni, Augusto; Turri, Marco (1984). Profilo storico della città di Legnano. Edizioni Landoni.
- Ferrarini, Gabriella; Stadiotti, Marco (2001). Legnano. Una città, la sua storia, la sua anima. Telesio editore.
- Turri, Marco (1974). La Basilica di San Magno a Legnano. Istituto italiano d'arti grafiche.
