= Palazzo Leone da Perego =

Palace in Legnano, Lombardy, Italy

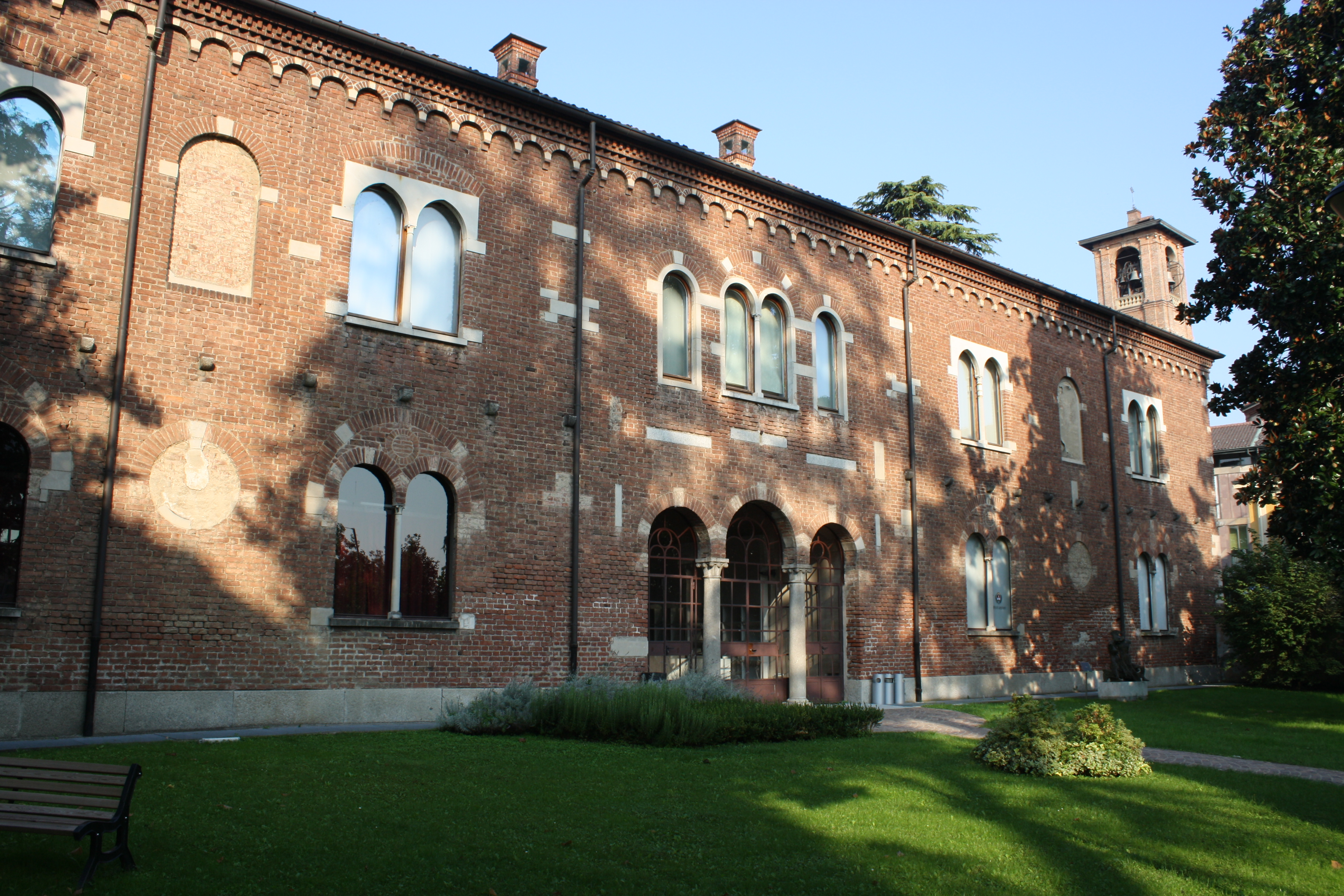
- The main façade of Palazzo Leone da Perego
- Interactive map of the Palazzo Leone da Perego area

General information
- Status: In use
- Type: Palace
- Location: Legnano, Lombardia, Italy, 10, via Girardelli
- Coordinates: 45.593831°N 8.91838°E
- Current tenants: Museum
- Construction started: 1898

Palazzo Leone da Perego is a historical building in Legnano. It was rebuilt in 1898 preserving some decorations of the previous medieval building of the same name. Located a few steps from the Basilica di San Magno, it has two entrances, one in via Magenta and the other in via Girardelli. It is named after Leone da Perego, archbishop of Milan who died in Legnano in 1257. Together with Palazzo Visconti it forms the "Corte Arcivescovile".

== History ==
Evening view of the modern Palazzo Leone da Perego

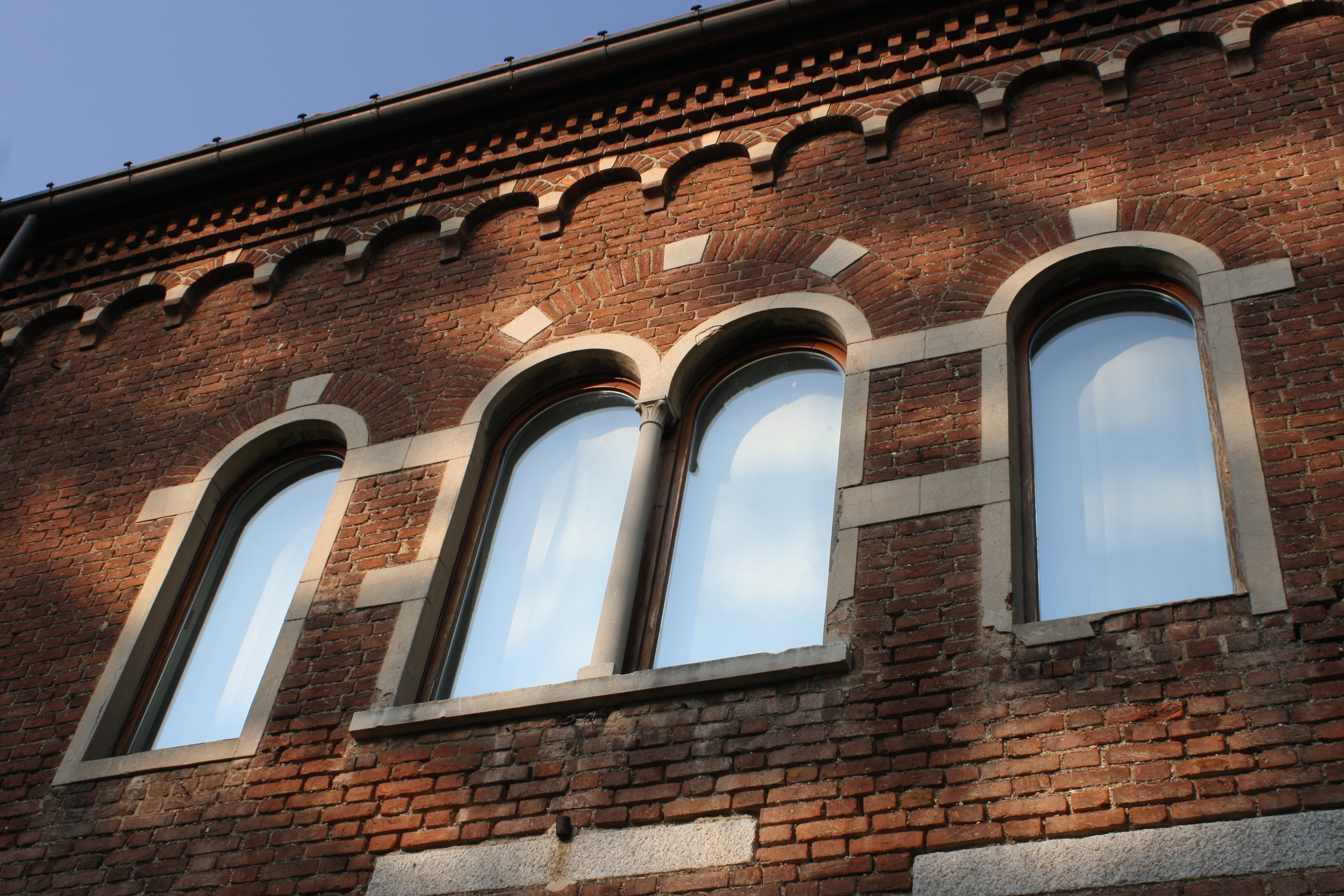
Particular of the windows on the first floor of the modern Leone da Perego palace

The medieval Leone da Perego palace was probably built in the 13th century, oppure, secondo alcuni studi, nel 9th century. The building became the noble summer residence of the archbishop Leone da Perego, thanks to whom it experienced a period of splendour that lasted until the end of the 15th century.

From the palace Leone da Perego ("in nostro archiepiscopali palatio") l'arcivescovo di Milano Francesco I da Parma, successore di Ottone Visconti e saltuariamente dimorante a Legnano, concesse il 3 aprile 1297 quaranta giorni di indulgenza ai fedeli che avessero donato i fondi necessari per completare i lavori della chiesa di San Pietro di Saronno.

In 1361, the archbishop of Milan Roberto Visconti took refuge in the town of Legnano to escape the plague: according to some sources, he died in Legnano at the Leone da Perego Palace.

The south side of the medieval Palazzo Leone da Perego was overlooked by the ancient Palazzo Visconti, which is known in medieval documents as "preciosa pallatia".

In correspondence with Palazzo Visconti, even after the demolition of the castello dei Cotta, the "porta di sotto", urban gate built in the Middle Ages and demolished in 1818, continued to be present. This covered passageway, with the demolition of the Cotta castle, began to connect the architectural complex formed by Palazzo Leone da Perego and Palazzo Visconti, to a building on the other side of today's Corso Magenta, which at the time was called Via Porta di Sotto.

In 1898 Palazzo Leone da Perego was demolished and rebuilt using some decorations from the previous complex of the same name. Of the latter, the only ones that have survived are two Visconti coats of arms that can be found, respectively, at the entrance to Corso Magenta (in this case it is a marble coat of arms of Ottone Visconti from 1277. Palazzo Visconti was instead almost completely rebuilt in 1937. The gateway leading from Corso Magenta into the archiepiscopal court was rebuilt in 1890.

== Bibliography ==
=== Italian sources ===
- Autori vari, Il Palio di Legnano : Sagra del Carroccio e Palio delle Contrade nella storia e nella vita della città, Banca di Legnano, 2015, SBN IT\ICCU\TO0\1145476.
- Giorgio D'Ilario, Egidio Gianazza, Augusto Marinoni, Marco Turri, Profilo storico della città di Legnano, Edizioni Landoni, 1984, ISBN non esistente.
- Attilio Agnoletto, San Giorgio su Legnano - storia, società, ambiente, 1992, ISBN non esistente.
- Gabriella Ferrarini, Marco Stadiotti, Legnano. Una città, la sua storia, la sua anima, Telesio editore, 2001, SBN IT\ICCU\RMR\0096536.
