= Cotta castle =

Castle in Legnano, Italy

Cotta Castle
- Near Legnano in Italy

Site information
- Type: Castle
- Condition: Demolished and replaced by other buildings

Location
- Coordinates: 45°35′37.79″N 8°55′06.17″E

Site history
- Built: 10th century
- In use: 10th century–13th century
- Fate: Demolished in the 13th/14th century
- Demolished: 13th/14th century
- Battles/wars: Battle of Legnano

Garrison information
- Past commanders: Amizio Cotta; Erlembaldo I Cotta; Landolfo Cotta; Erlembaldo II Cotta

The Cotta Castle (Italian: Castello dei Cotta) was an early medieval fortification present in Legnano from the 10th to the 13th/14th centuries in the area where the modern Leone da Perego Palace and INA Gallery stand. It was one of the military outposts used during the Battle of Legnano on May 29, 1176.

== Position in local geography ==
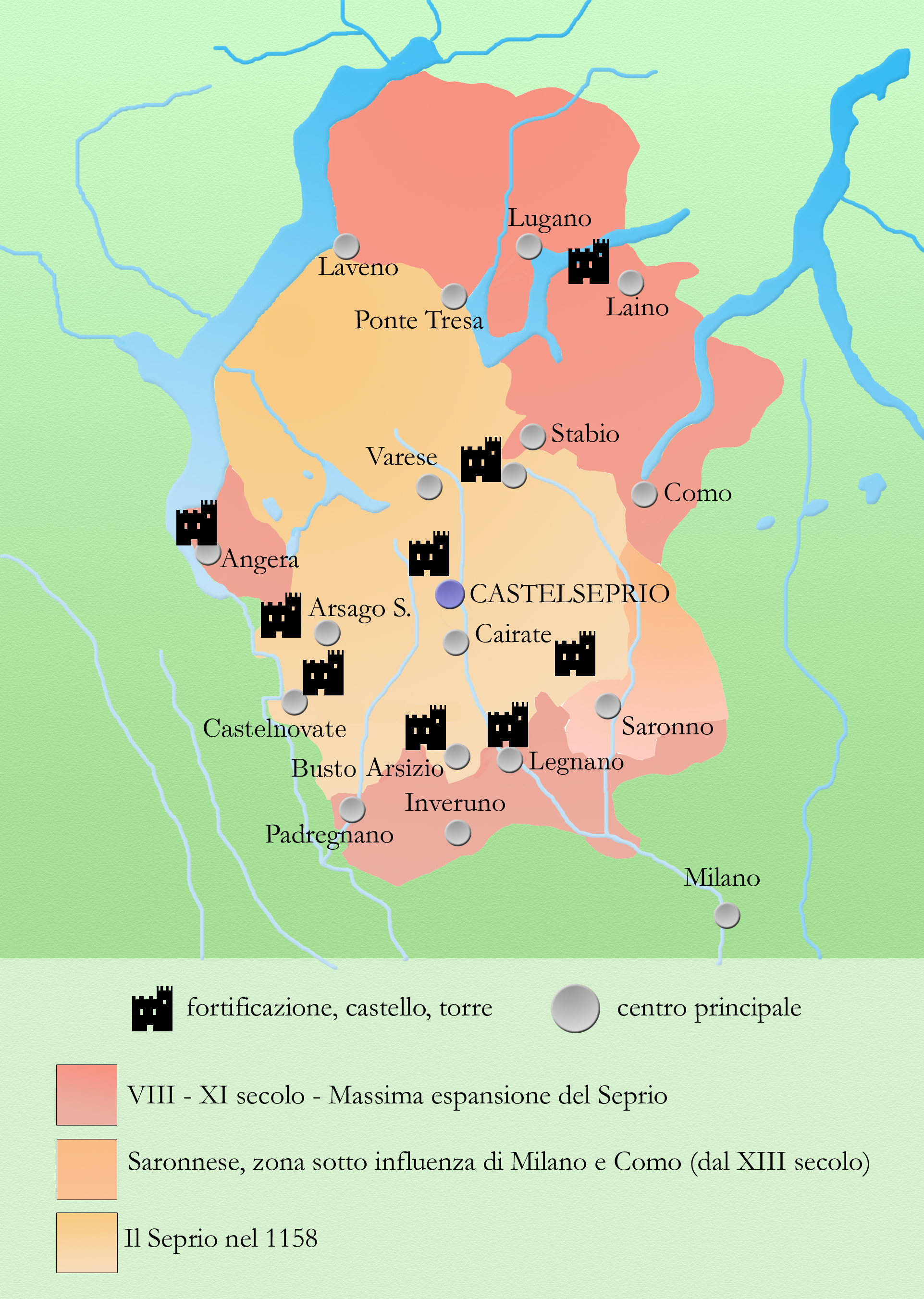
Map of Seprio.

The presence of a castle in Legnano is related to the strategic function the locality had from the early Middle Ages to the 16th century. Legnano was located along an important communication route from the Olona Valley and connected Milan to northwestern Lombardy.

This road, which had existed since Roman times, was the Via Severiana Augusta. It connected Mediolanum with Verbannus Lacus or Lake Maggiore. Napoleon Bonaparte later took over its route to make the Simplon highway. The defense of Legnano was important because its eventual conquest could have allowed the enemies of the Lordship of Milan access to Seprio via the Olona Valley, which ends at Castellanza, and to the capital city itself through the use of the aforementioned road.

In the Middle Ages, Legnano, although according to some authors it belonged to Seprio, gravitated around Milan. The Cotta castle served as a defensive bulwark of the Milanese countryside and, by extension, of Milan as well. The link between Milan and the city of the Carroccio was not only military but also economic, as Legnano supplied foodstuffs.

For these reasons, the Milanese archbishops Leone da Perego and Ottone Visconti often stayed in Legnano. He established his residence at the Cotta castle because he preferred it, as a military outpost, to the Braida Arcivescovile, located in the city center of Legnano, which was deemed insufficiently secure. The castle, however, was difficult to expand unless a large number of dwellings were demolished.

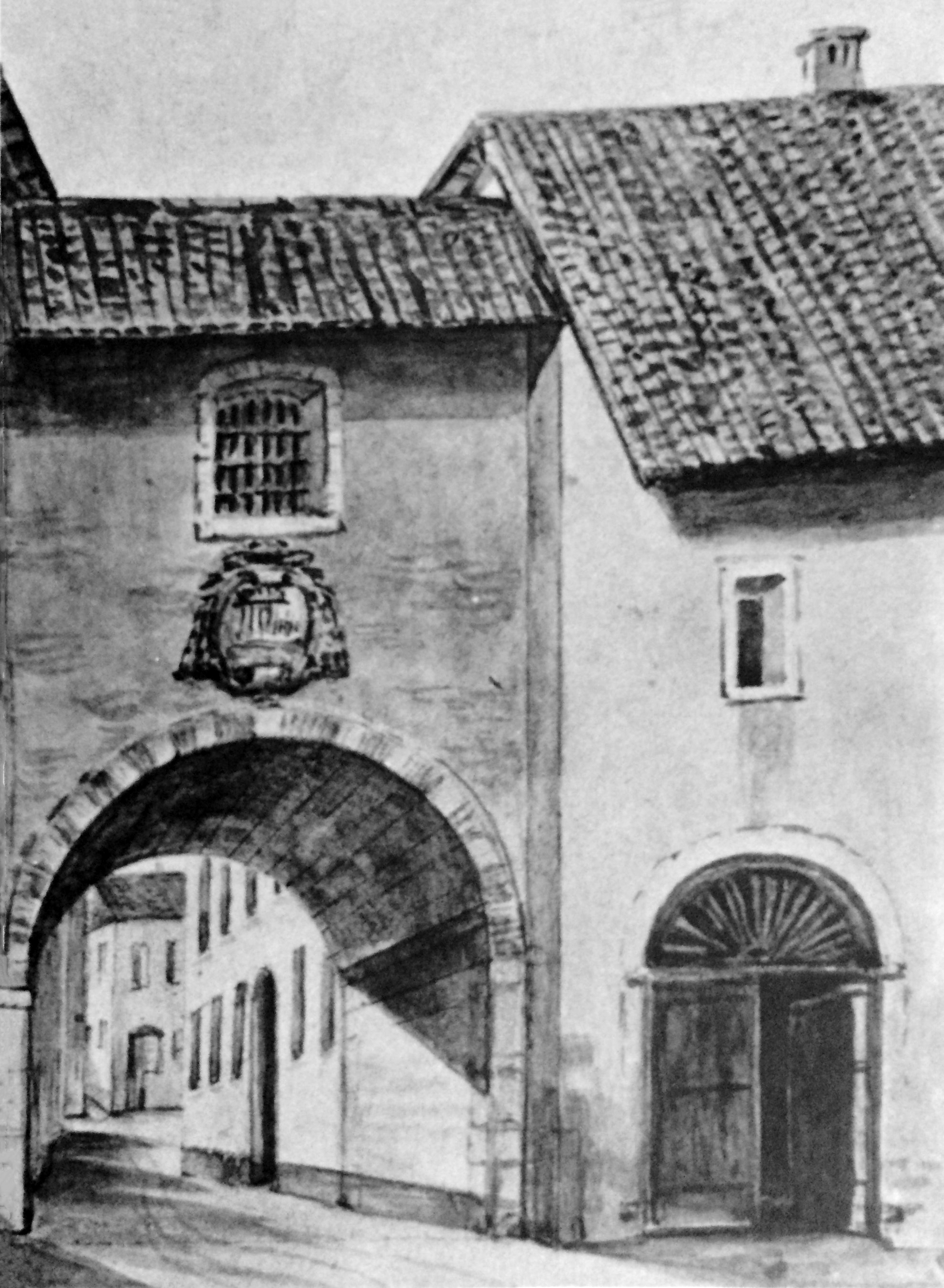
The Lower Gate in an 1875 watercolor by Giuseppe Pirovano. (Note: However, the painter from Legnano did not witness the subject painted. See Ferrarini & Stadiotti (2001, p. 101.))

The Cotta castle was also the protagonist of the Battle of Legnano which took place on May 29, 1176. It was one of the military garrisons of the Lombard League during the armed clash with Frederick Barbarossa. The League's choice to place the carroccio at Legnano before the clash with Barbarossa was not fortuitous but related to the easy access to the Milanese countryside: this gateway had to be closed and defended to prevent an attack on Milan.

== History ==
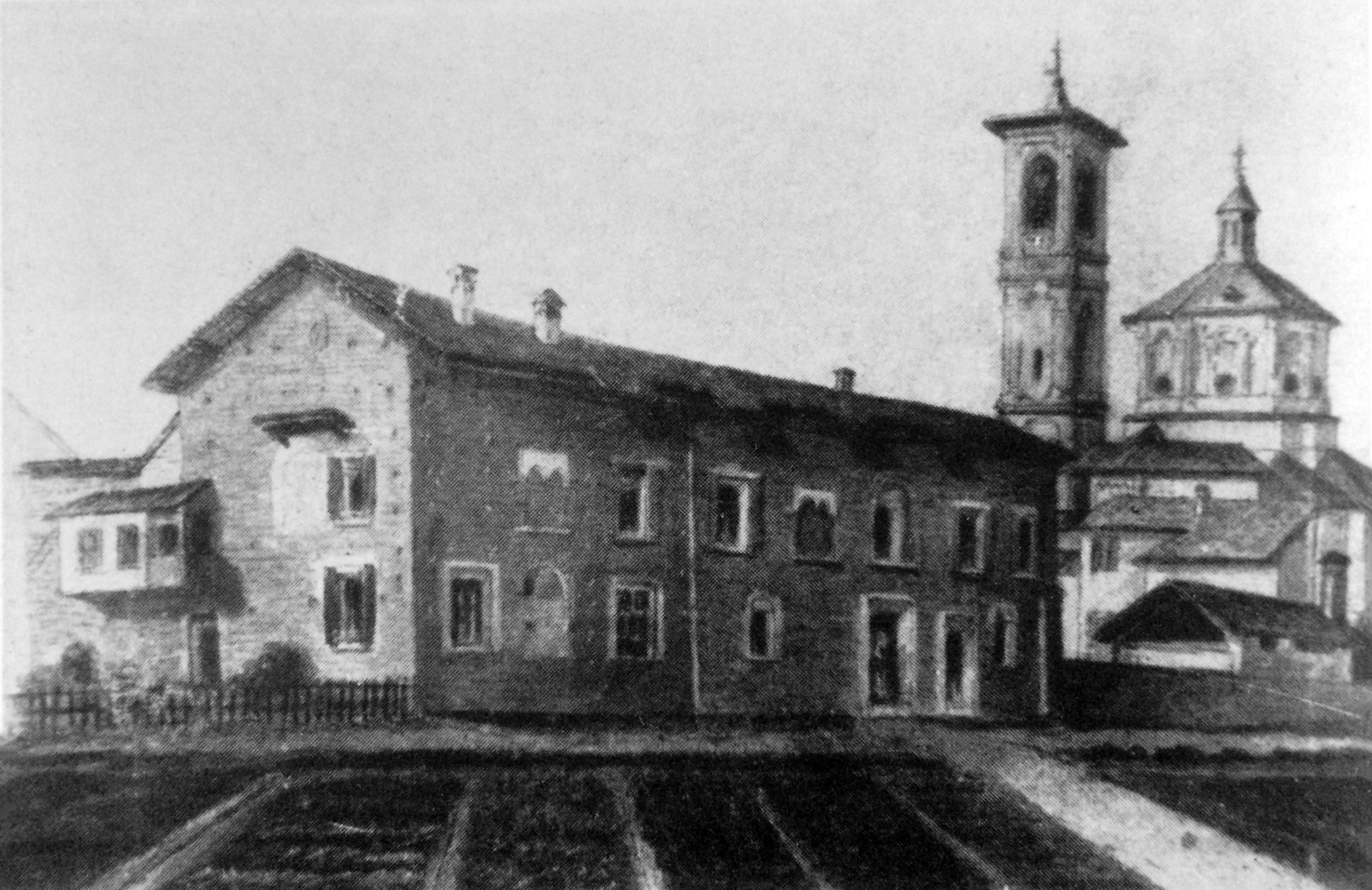
The ancient Leone da Perego palace, founded in the Middle Ages, in a watercolor by Giuseppe Pirovano.

The Cotta castle was most likely built in the 10th century to counter Hungarian raids. The first core of the manor was presumably a watchtower, to which was added a cita mural: its structure was thus very simple. In the 11th century, the latter was completed by the addition of a fortified palace.

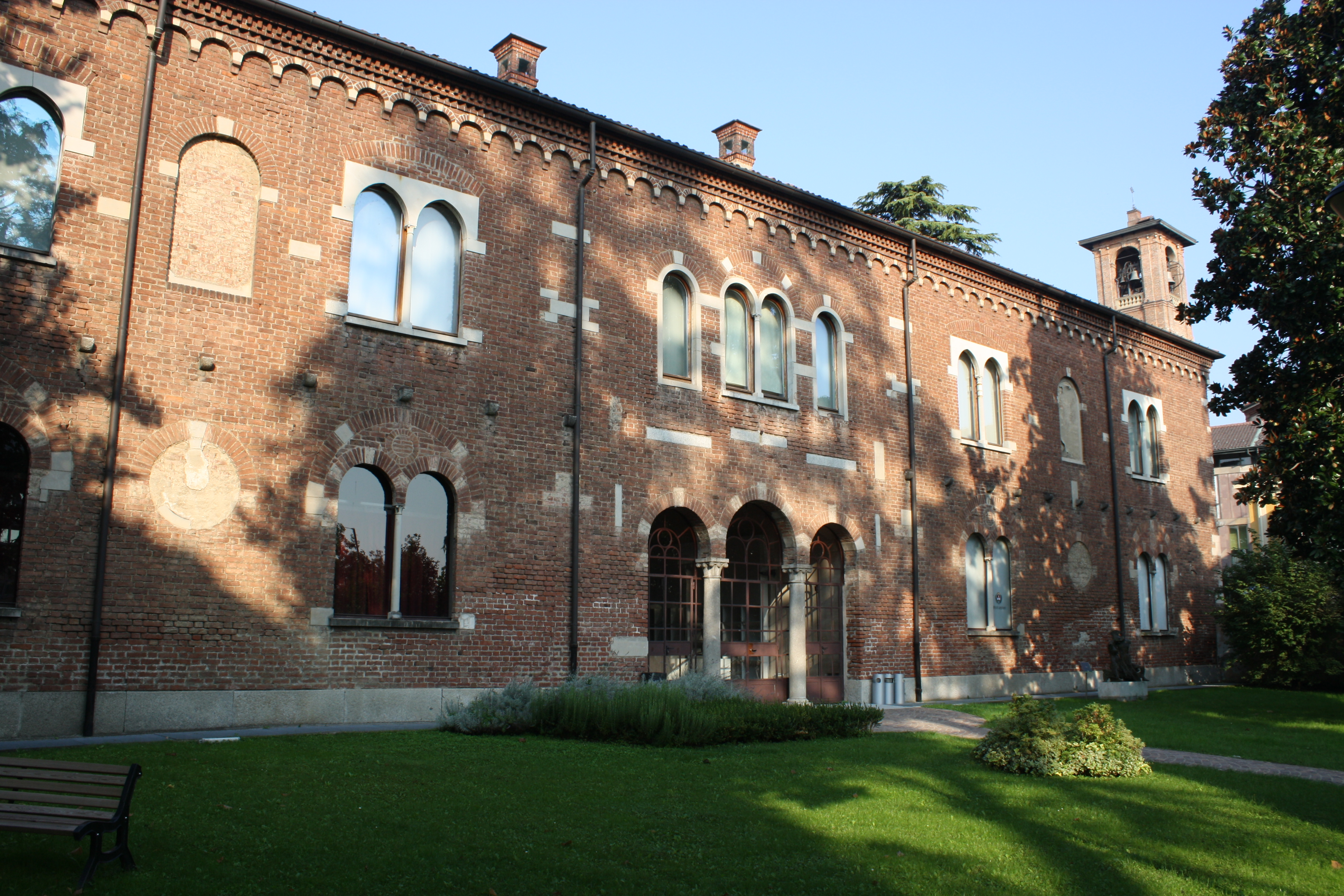
The nineteenth-century reconstruction of the medieval building of the same name.

The Cotta castle had a rectangular shape measuring 22m by 6.5m and possessed various rooms for the garrisons and the captain of arms. In addition to the defensive works of the castle, there were also a moat into which part of the waters of the Olonella had been diverted, and walls that enclosed the town of Legnano. The walls, which were about one meter thick, were renovated in the 13th century. The outline of the built-up area of early medieval Legnano was still recognizable from the map of the Catasto Teresiano, which was made in 1722, while the course of part of the walls can still be identified today by following the route of modern streets Palestro, Giulini, and Corridoni.

The Cotta castle was demolished between the 13th and 14th centuries. In fact, in the Notitiae Cleri Mediolanensi of 1398, (Note: That is, from the list of churches in the Milan area that compiled by the Church.) it appears that in place of the Cotta castle were located the convent of the Umiliati and the church of Santa Maria del Priorato, which were themselves demolished in 1953.

The gradual fortification of the complex was the work of the Cotta family. This family was a vassal of the archbishop of Milan and took part in the latter's struggle against the Seprio countryside. The first Cotta to settle in the castle were Amizio and his son Erlembaldo in 1014. They were imperial envoys. Owning a fortification in their name, it is presumable that part of the settlement was enfeoffed by this noble lineage with the approval of the archbishop of Milan. This epoch was characterized by the steady growth of archiepiscopal power over Legnano, which began to free itself from imperial power.

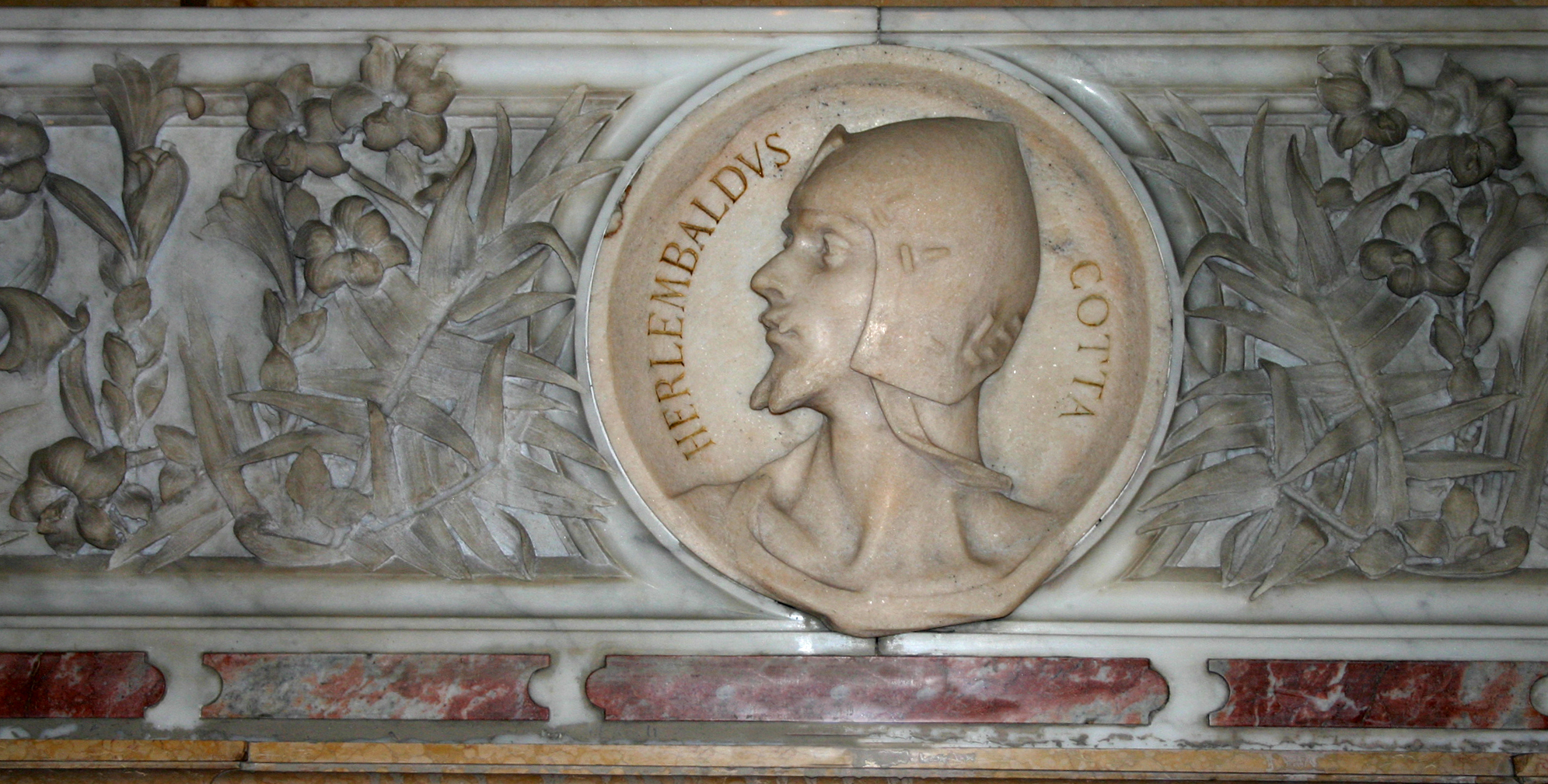
Medallion depicting Erlembaldo II Cotta in the Basilica of San Calimero in Milan.

Later on, two descendants of Amizio and Erlembaldo, Landolfo and Erlembaldo II became followers of the pataria, that is, the movement that arose within the medieval Milanese Church that preached poverty, especially about the Milanese archbishopric, and engaged in the fight against simony to marriage or concubinage of priests. The Pataria was considered heretical and its leader, Arialdo, had to take refuge in Legnano in the castle of the Cotta family, welcomed by Erlembaldo II: here he was singled out and betrayed by a priest who was his follower and then given into the custody of the men of Archbishop Guido da Velate. The first documentary mention of the village of Legnano is linked to this event.

In Landolfo Seniore's Historia Mediolanensis, an 11th-century text, it reads that Arialdo was captured:

(LA) «[...] iuxta locum Legnani [...]»

— (Mediolan History)

(EN)) «in the vicinity of Legnano»

Subsequently, the Cotta family disappeared from the chronicles. By the mid-12th century, power over Legnano was exercised only by the archbishopric. On a document dated July 29, 1148, it can be read that "Legniano" was also in the orbit of the archbishop of Milan, a prerogative granted by Pope Eugene III.

Next to the Cotta castle other buildings later arose, including the original Palazzo Leone da Perego and the present Palazzo Visconti. In 1898, the medieval Leone da Perego Palace was demolished, being replaced by the present, eponymous structure. This agglomeration of buildings is still known as the "Mensa Arcivescovile" or "Corte Arcivescovile."

=== The archaeological excavations ===
The remains of the Cotta castle were found by Guido Sutermeister in 1951 during excavations for the demolition of the Humiliati convent and the church of Santa Maria del Priorato that was carried out for the construction of the INA Gallery. The foundations of part of the palace and the defensive walls of Legnano were found. Of the part of the castle that extended over the area adjacent to the present-day Palazzo Leone da Perego, no finds have come down to us due to the absence of relevant excavations at the height of the archaeological remains of medieval Legnano, which lie 1.5m below the present street level.

In addition to the remains of the castle, during excavations for the construction of the INA Tunnel, the foundations of the medieval walls - with an adjoining moat fed by the Olonella River - that encircled the center of Legnano were found. This defensive system was equipped with two gates, one of which, known as "Porta di Sotto," was demolished in 1818 because it made it difficult for farmers' wagons to circulate. It was located to the south of the town, of which it formed the southern boundary, along the modern Corso Magenta, which at the time was called Via Porta di Sotto, just ahead of the entrance to Palazzo Leone da Perego and near the ancient Cotta castle. To the north was presumably located an "Upper Gate," of which, however, no tangible evidence remains, since it was likely torn down in earlier times.

In the early Middle Ages Legnano thus appeared as a fortified citadel formed by the church of San Salvatore, the Cotta castle, which was the seat of political power, and a small group of houses gathered around the square, all enclosed by defensive walls.

== See also ==
- Battle of Legnano
- Castle
- Fortification
- Palazzo Leone da Perego
- Lombard League

== Bibliography ==
- Agnoletto, Attilio (1992). San Giorgio su Legnano - storia, società, ambiente [San Giorgio su Legnano - history, society, environment] (in Italian). Comune.
- Various Authors (2014). Di città in città – Insediamenti, strade e vie d'acqua da Milano alla Svizzera lungo la Mediolanum-Verbannus [From City to City – Settlements, Roads and Waterways from Milan to Switzerland along the Mediolanum-Verbannus] (in Italian). Soprintendenza Archeologia della Lombardia. Archived from the original on 16 February 2017.
- Various Authors (2015). Il Palio di Legnano : Sagra del Carroccio e Palio delle Contrade nella storia e nella vita della città [The Palio of Legnano: Sagra del Carroccio and Palio delle Contrade in the history and life of the city] (in Italian). Banca di Legnano.
- D'Ilario, Giorgio; Gianazza, Egidio; Marinoni, Augusto; Turri, Marco (1984). Profilo storico della città di Legnano, Edizioni Landoni [Historical Profile of the City of Legnano, Landoni Editions] (in Italian). Famiglia Legnanese.
- Ferrarini, Gabriella; Stadiotti, Marco (2001). Legnano. Una città, la sua storia, la sua anima [Legnano. A city, its history, its soul.] (in Italian). Telesio Publisher.
- Sutermeister, Guido (1940). Il castello di Legnano - Memorie n°8 [The Castle of Legnano - Memoirs No. 8] (in Italian). Tipografica Legnanese.
