= Codex Trivulzianus =

Manuscript by Leonardo da Vinci

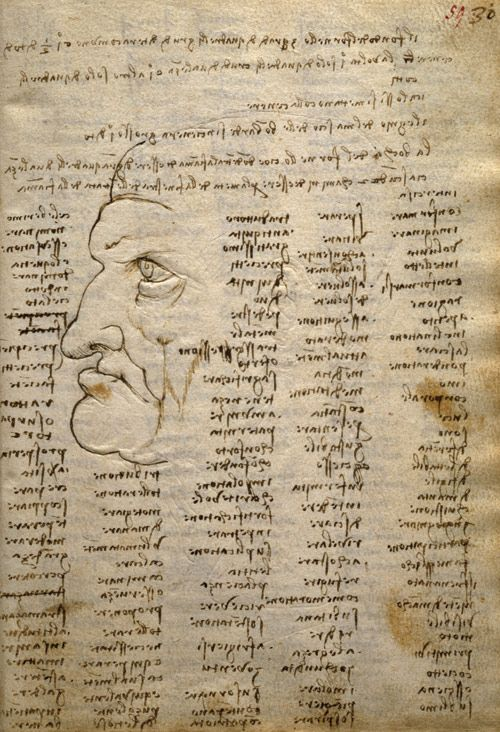
Page of the Codex Trivulzianus

The Codex Trivulzianus is a manuscript by Leonardo da Vinci that originally contained 62 sheets, but today only 55 remain. It documents Leonardo's attempts to improve his modest literary education, through long lists of learned words copied from authoritative lexical and grammatical sources. The manuscript also contains studies of military and religious architecture.

The Codex Trivulzianus is kept in the Biblioteca Trivulziana at Sforza Castle in Milan, Italy, but is not normally available to the public. In the main museum a room also contains frescos painted by Leonardo.

== See also ==
- List of works by Leonardo da Vinci
