= Legnanese dialect =

Lombard dialect spoken in Legnano

Legnanese
- Legnanés
- Native to: Italy
- Region: Lombardy
- Native speakers: About 30 percent of the population of the area in which it is spread 2006 figure.
- Language family: Indo-European: Romance; Western Romance; Gallo-Romance; Gallo-Italic; Lombard; Western Lombard; Legnanese

Language codes
- ISO 639-3: lmo

Legnanese dialect (Note: Recognizing the arbitrariness of definitions, the term "language" is used in the nomenclature of entries in accordance with ISO 639-1, 639-2 or 639-3. In other cases, the term "dialect" is used.) (native name legnanés, IPA: [leɲaˈneːs]) is a dialect of the Lombard language (belonging to the western branch) that is spoken around Legnano, a municipality in the metropolitan city of Milan, Lombardy. It is spoken by about 30 percent of the population of the area in which it is spread.

Legnano, starting in the 11th century, began to bond with Milan. The village of Legnano represented, for those coming from the north, the gateway to the Milanese countryside and thus had an important strategic function for the city of Milan. The link between Legnano and Milan also influenced the Legnano vernacular, which began to differentiate itself from the neighboring Bustocco dialect. Due to the frequent contacts between the two cities, the Milanese dialect began to "contaminate" the dialect spoken in Legnano. Despite this trend, the Legnano dialect continued to preserve - over the centuries - a considerable difference from the Milanese dialect.

An important distinctive phonetic trait that is present in Legnanese and neighboring Bustocco, and that differentiates these dialects from the idioms of contiguous isoglosses, is the preservation of unaccented final vowels. However, due to the contamination of the Milanese dialect, the Legnano vernacular, unlike the Bustocco dialect, does not preserve the final atonal vowel for many words. Another feature that differentiates the Legnano dialect from the Bustocco dialect concerns the intervocalic -r. In the Legnanese vernacular it has been preserved, while in the Bustocco vernacular it has been eliminated.

The plays of the Italian dialect theater company "I Legnanesi" are written in the Legnanese dialect.

== History ==
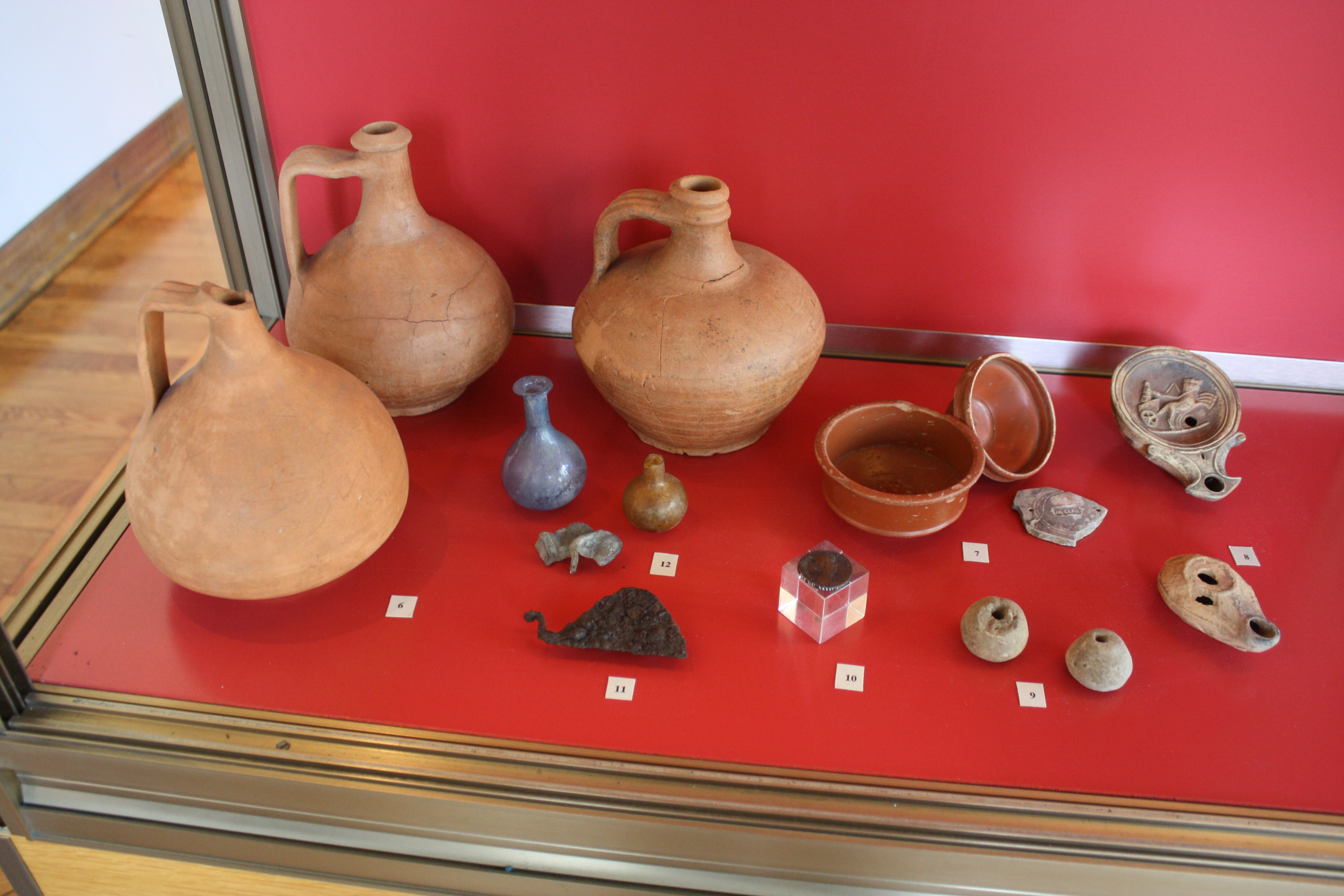
Roman findings (2nd century A.D.) excavated between 1957 and 1960 at Casina Pace in Legnano. They consist of clay pots, small cups, oil lamps, coins, razors and jars and are kept in the Guido Sutermeister Civic Museum in Legnano.

The oldest linguistic substratum that has left a trace in Legnanese and of which there are some records is that of the ancient Ligurians. However, the information available for this idiom is very vague and extremely limited. The picture that can be drawn for the populations that replaced the Ligurians, the Celts (or "Gauls"), is quite different. The linguistic influence of the Celts on the local language was striking, so much so that even today the dialect of Legnano is classified as "Gallo-Roman". However, it was the Roman domination, which replaced the Celtic one, that shaped the local language spoken in Legnano, so much so that the lexicon and the grammar of this language are of Romance derivation.

However, the influence of the Latin language in the dominated territories was not homogeneous. The idioms spoken in the different areas were in fact influenced by the earlier linguistic substrata. Each area was characterized by a greater or lesser characterization towards ancient Ligurian or Celtic languages, and Legnanese was no exception. However, data on the real influence of these two substrates on the various dialects are very scarce and of different interpretation. This has given rise to a debate among linguists that has led to great caution in attributing a given phonetic feature of the Legnanese dialect to the Ligurian or Celtic substratum.

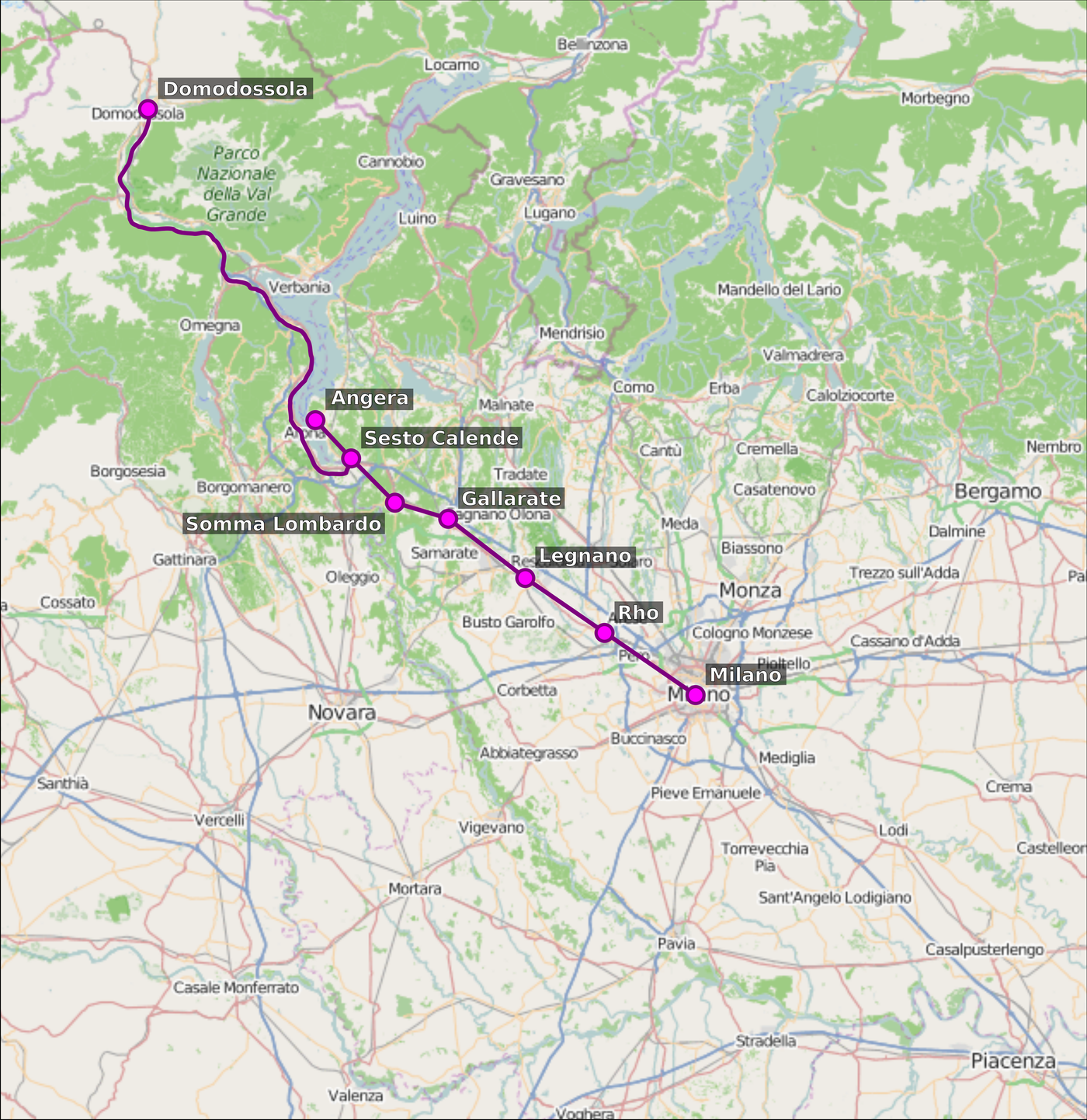
Route of the Via Severiana Augusta, an ancient Roman road that was also used in the Middle Ages and the following centuries

The birth of modern Italian dialects can be traced back to the situation after the fall of the Western Roman Empire. The local population suffered an administrative, economic, demographic and cultural regression that led to the formation of small communities isolated from each other. Because of the isolation suffered by these groups, the language spoken evolved into different variants that were characteristic of the community that used them. The linguistic boundaries of these dialects were then defined in later centuries with the establishment of parishes. These parishes were, in fact, the reference point of a particular community, which gathered around them to discuss and solve everyday problems. (Note: Such issues could be religious or civil in nature.) As a result, each parish had its own isogloss, whose linguistic boundaries have survived, with minor modifications, until the 21st century.

Legnano, from the 11th century, began to connect with Milan. The town of Legnano, in fact, represented an easy access to the Milanese countryside for those coming from the north, since it was located at the outlet of the Olona Valley, which ends in Castellanza; such a gateway therefore had to be closed and strongly defended to prevent an attack on Milan, which was also facilitated by the presence of an important road that had existed since Roman times, the Via Severiana Augusta, which connected Mediolanum (modern Milan) with the Verbannus Lacus (Lake Verbano, i.e., Lake Maggiore). Its route was later taken over by Napoleon Bonaparte to build the Simplon highway.

Milan's relationship with Legnano was not only military, but also economic: Milan was supplied with part of the food produced by Legnano and the other contadi that surrounded the Milanese capital. From the Middle Ages, an increasing number of Milanese noble families began to stay in Legnano at various times of the year and to purchase properties in the town.

This role aggravated the friction with Busto Arsizio, which instead continued to be linked to Seprio. The link between Legnano and Milan, and the presence of Milanese noble families, also influenced the Legnano dialect, which began to differentiate itself from the Busto dialect. Due to the frequent contacts between the two cities, the Milanese dialect began to "contaminate" the language spoken in Legnano. In spite of this trend, however, the Legnano dialect continued - over the centuries - to preserve a remarkable diversity from the Milanese dialect. This "contamination" continued until the 19th century, when it accelerated. The process was so rapid that, in the same century, slight differences were created even between the vernaculars spoken by contiguous generations. This process of contamination of the Milanese language was later joined by that of the Italian language.

The Milanese dialect also played an important role in Legnano for another reason, this time a social one. Until the beginning of the 20th century, two dialects were in use in Legnano: the lower classes used the dialect of Legnano proper, while the wealthier citizens spoke the Milanese vernacular. Already in the Middle Ages, it was common for some Milanese noble families to stay in Legnano at different times of the year, which helped to accentuate this tendency. Between the 18th and 19th centuries, the Legnano dialect, like all Lombard idioms, lost the remote past tense, (Note: Biondelli reports that the Milanese dialect was the first Lombard variant to lose this verbal tense. See Biondelli, Bernardino: Essay on Gallo-Italic dialects, 1853.) which was replaced by the perfect tense.

== Features ==
=== Phonetics ===
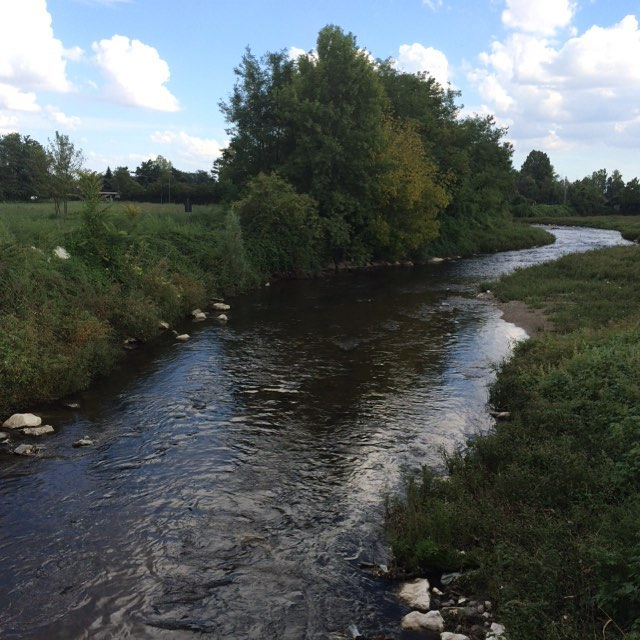
The river Olona downstream from the castle of Legnano. This waterway is called "Urona" in the Legnano dialect, while in the Bustocco dialect it is called "Uona".

An important phonetic feature present in the Legnano and Bustocco dialects, and which distinguishes these dialects from the idioms of the adjacent isoglosses, is the preservation of unaccented final vowels. Specifically, the phenomenon of their elision - with the exception of -a - began around the 9th century in France, Piedmont, Emilia-Romagna and Lombardy, that is, in areas once dominated by the Celts. (Note: In the dialects of the Po Valley, the -a was instead preserved, while in France it was changed to the silent -e. See Giorgio D'Ilario, Dizionario legnanese, 2003, p. 31.) For example, in the Milanese dialect one says temp ("time"), oeucc ("eye") and oreggia ("ear"), while in Legnano the terms used to express the same concepts are tempu, ögiu and urégia. The same preservation of atonal vowels is also found in the dialects of Galliate and Borgomanero.

This rule has also been applied to relatively recent words. For example, "cassetto" (drawer), which entered the vocabulary in the 15th century, is written as cassett in the Milanese dialect, while in Legnano it is written as casétu. However, due to the contamination of the Milanese dialect, the Legnano dialect does not preserve the final atonal vowel for many words. For example, in Busto Arsizio one says düu ("hard") and udùi ("smell"), while in Legnano the same concepts are expressed with dür and udùr.

Another important difference between the Legnanese and Bustocco dialects concerns the intervocalic -r. In the Legnanese dialect it has been preserved, while in the Bustocco dialect it has been eliminated. In fact, in Busto Arsizio one says candìa, uona and sia to refer to "candle", "Olona" and "evening", while in Legnano one uses the terms candìra, Urona and sira. This peculiarity, which distinguishes the Legnano dialect from the Bustocco dialect, is also borrowed from the Milanese dialect. The fall of the intervocalic -r is also subject to changes in many French dialects.

An example of a comparative table between the Milanese, Legnanese and Bustocco dialects is as follows:

English	Milanese	Legnanese	Bustocco
Roof	tècc	téciu	ticiu
Hard	dur	dür	düu
Smell	odor	udùr	udùi
On (one's person)	addoss	adós	adósu
Arm	brasc	brasc	brasciu
Egg	oeuv	ö	öu
Olona	Ulona	Urona	Uòna

=== Lexicon ===
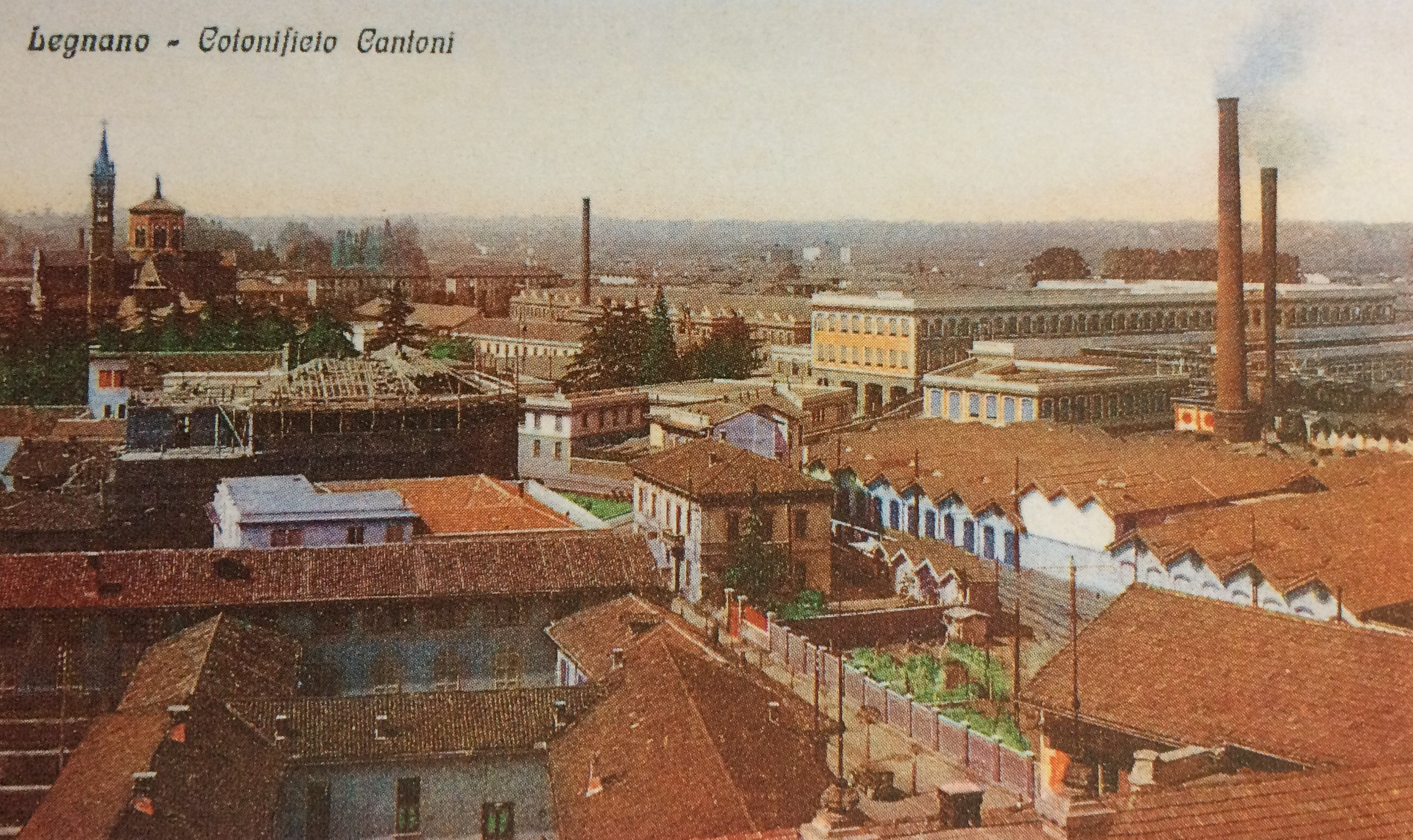
View of the historic Cantoni Cotton Mill factory in 1920. The people of Legnano coined the dialectal neologism "Cantunificiu" for this factory.

The Legnano dialect was characterized by a peculiar lexicon that was gradually impoverished over the centuries due to the standardization of the Legnano dialect into Milanese and, later, into Italian. Once the specific term in the Legnano dialect to refer to the rainbow was rasciùm (later the Legnanese began to use the word arcubalén to express the same concept). Another example is ragiù, which in the Legnanese dialect means "head of the family" (the local association "Famiglia Legnanese" still uses this term in the 21st century to define the office corresponding to the representative head of the association). The Busto dialect is no less diverse. In Busto Arsizio, for example, there are five words to define "fog": nébia, caligiu, brögia, scighéa and luèsa.

In past centuries, the term used to refer to Legnano was also different. The less wealthy population, who used the actual Legnanese dialect, called their town Lìgnan, while the wealthier classes, who spoke the Milanese dialect, called their town Legnàn. By the beginning of the 20th century, however, the first word had become obsolete. Other archaic words of the Legnanese dialect that have disappeared are ardìa ("iron wire". Later the people of Legnano began to use the term fil da fèr), bagàtu ("shoemaker". Later the term sciavatìn came into use), buarùm ("mud made by melting snow". Later the generic word palta, meaning "mud", came into use), instravilà ("to put on the right track") and insurmentì ("to fall asleep". Later the people of Legnano began to use the term indurmentàs). Like all languages, the dialect of Legnano has been enriched with neologisms, even in relatively recent times. An example is Cantunificiu, which is the Legnanese word for the Cantoni Cotton Mill.

== Verbs ==
The Legnanese dialect, unlike Italian, has four verb conjugations.

=== The auxiliary verb "vès" (to be) ===
- Present Indicative: mì (a) sóm, tì te sé, lü (a) l'é, nün (a) sèm, vióltar (a) sì, lur (a) ìn.
- Imperfect Indicative: mì (a) sévu, tì te sévi, lü (a) l'éva, nün (a) sévum, vióltar (a) sévi, lur (i) ìvan.
- Future Indicative: mì (a) saró, tì te saré, lü (a) l'sarà, nün (a) sarèm, vióltar (a) sarì, lur a (a) saràn.
- Present Conjunctive: che mì sìa, che tì ta sìa, che lü l'sia, che nün sìum, che vióltar sìi, che lur sìan.
- Imperfect subjunctive: che mì füsu, che tì te füsi, che lü l'füs/füdés, che nün a füsum, che vióltar füsi, che lur a füsan.
- Present conditional: mì sarìa/sarisu, tì te sarìa/sarisi, lü a l'sarìa/sarìs, nün sarìum/sarìsum, vióltar sarisi, lur sarìan/sarìsan.
- Infinite present: vès
- Past participle: sta.

=== The auxiliary verb "avé" (to have) ===
- Present Indicative: mì ó, tì t'é, lü l'à, nün èm, vióltar avì, lur àn.
- Imperfect Indicative: mì évu, t'évi, lü l'éva, nün évum, vióltar évi, lur évan.
- Future Indicative: mì avaró, tì avaré, lü l'avarà, nün avarèm, vióltar avarì, lur avaràn.
- Present Conjunctive: che mì abia, che tì abia, che lu l'abia, che nün àbium, che vióltar avì, che lur àbian.
- Imperfect subjunctive: che mì avésu, che tì t'avési, che lu a l'avés, che nün avésum, che vióltar avisi, che lur avésan.
- Present conditional: mì avarìa/avarisu, tì t'avarìa/avarisi, lu l'avaria/avarìs, nüm avarìum/avarìsum, vióltar avarisi, lur avarìan/avarìsan.
- Infinite present: avé.
- Past participle: vü.

=== The first conjugation: "saltà" (to jump) ===
- Present Indicative: mì (a) saltu, tì te salti, lù l'salta, nün (a) saltum, vióltar (a) saltì, lur (i) saltan.
- Imperfect Indicative: mì (a) saltavu, tì te saltavi, lù l'saltava, nün (a) saltàvum, vióltar (a) saltavi, lur (a) saltàvan.
- Future Indicative: mì (a) saltaró, tì te saltaré, lü l'saltarà, nün (a) saltarèm, vióltar (a) saltarì, lur (a) saltaràn.
- Present Conjunctive: che mì (a) saltu, che tì te salti, che lü l'salta, che nün (a) saltum, che vióltar (a) saltì, che lur (i) saltan.
- Imperfect subjunctive: che mì saltasu, che tì te saltasi, che lü l'saltàs, che nün saltàsum, che vióltar saltasi, che lur saltàsan.
- Present conditional: mì saltarisu, tì te saltarisi, lü l'saltarìs, nün saltarìsum, vióltar saltarisi, lur saltarìsan.
- Infinite present: saltà.
- Past participle: saltà

=== The second conjugation: "vidé" (to see) ===
- Present Indicative: mì (a) védu, tì te védi, lù l'védi, nün (a) védum, vióltar (a) vidì, lur (a) védan.
- Imperfect Indicative: mì (a) vidévu, tì te vidévi, lü l'vidéva, nün (a) vidévum, vióltar (a) vidévi, lur (a) vidévan.
- Future Indicative: mì (a) vedaró, tì te vedaré, lü l'vedarà, nün (a) vedarèm, vióltar (a) vedarì, lur (a) vedaràn.
- Present Conjunctive: che mì (a) védu, che tì te védi, che lü l'véda, che nün (a) védum, che vióltar (a) vedì, che lur (a) védan.
- Imperfect subjunctive: che mì vidésu, che tì te vidési, che lü l'vidés, che nün vidésum, che vióltar videsi, che lur vidésan.
- Present conditional: mì vedarisu, tì te vedarisi, lü l'vedarìs, nün vedarìsum, vióltar vedarisi, lur vedarìsan.
- Infinite present: vidé.
- Past participle: vistu.

=== The third conjugation: "dèrvi" (to open) ===
- Present Indicative: mì (a) dèrvu, ecc., tì te dèrvi, lü l'dèrvi, nün (a) dèrvum, vióltar (a) dervì, lur (a) dèrvan.
- Imperfect Indicative: mì (a) dervivu, tì te dervivi, lü l'derviva, nün (a) dervévum, vióltar (a) dervevi, lur (i) dervévan.
- Future Indicative: mì (a) dervaró, tì te dervaré, lü (a) l'dervarà, nün (a) dervarèm, vióltar (a) dervarì, lur (i) dervaràn.
- Present Conjunctive: che mì (a) dèrva, ecc., che tì te dèrva, che lü l'dèrva, che nün (a) dèrvum, che vióltar (a) dervì, che lur (a) dèrvan.
- Imperfect subjunctive: che mì a dervisu, che tì te dervisi, che lü l'dervìs, che nün dervìsum, che vióltar devisi, che lur dervìsan.
- Present conditional: mì dervarisu, tì te dervarisi, lü l'dervarìs, nün dervarìsum, violtar dervarisi, lur dervarìsan.
- Infinite present: dèrvi.
- Past participle: "dervù".

=== The fourth conjugation: "sentì" (to hear) ===
- Present Indicative: mì (a) séntu, tì te sénti, lü l'sénti, nün (a) séntum, vióltar (a) sentì, lur (i) séntan.
- Imperfect Indicative: mì (a) sentivu, tì te sentivi, lü l'sentiva, nün (a) sentìvum, vióltar (a) sentivi, lur (a) sentìvan.
- Future Indicative: mì (a) sentaró, tì te sentaré, lü l'sentarà, nün (a) sentarèm, vióltar (a) sentarì, lur (i) sentaràn.
- Present Conjunctive: che mì (a) séntu, che tì te sénti, che lü l'sénta, che nün (a) séntum, che vióltar a sentì, che lur (i) séntan.
- Imperfect subjunctive: che mì sentisu, che tì te sentisi, che lü l'sentìs, che nün sentìsum, che vióltar sentisi, che lur sentìsan.
- Present conditional: mì sentarisu, tì te sentarisi, lü l'sentarìs, nün sentarìsum, vióltar sentarisi, lur sentarìsan.
- Infinite present: sentì.

== "I Legnanesi" ==
The plays of the Italian dialect theater company "I Legnanesi" are written in the dialect of Legnano. Their comedies, the most famous example of en travesti theater in Italy, have as their subject satirical characters gravitating around a typical Lombard courtyard, the most prominent of which are Teresa, Mabilia, and Giovanni. The company, founded in Legnano in 1949 by Felice Musazzi, Tony Barlocco, and Luigi Cavalleri, is among the most important examples in Europe of dialect theater.

== See also ==
- Languages of Italy

== Bibliography ==
- Autori vari (2014). "Di città in città – Insediamenti, strade e vie d'acqua da Milano alla Svizzera lungo la Mediolanum-Verbannus". Soprintendenza Archeologia della Lombardia, 2014. Soprintendenza Archeologia della Lombardia. Archived from the original on 16 February 2017.
- Autori vari (2015). Il Palio di Legnano : Sagra del Carroccio e Palio delle Contrade nella storia e nella vita della città. Banca di Legnano.
- D'Ilario, Giorgio (2003). Dizionario legnanese. Artigianservice.
- Masetti, Elio (2009). La grammatica del dialetto di Legnano e dei Comuni limitrofi. Modulimpianti.
- D'Ilario, Giorgio; Egidio Gianazza, Augusto Marinoni, Marco Turri (1984). Profilo storico della città di Legnano. Edizioni Landoni.
- Agnoletto, Attilio (1992). San Giorgio su Legnano - storia, società, ambiente.
