= Culture of Italy =

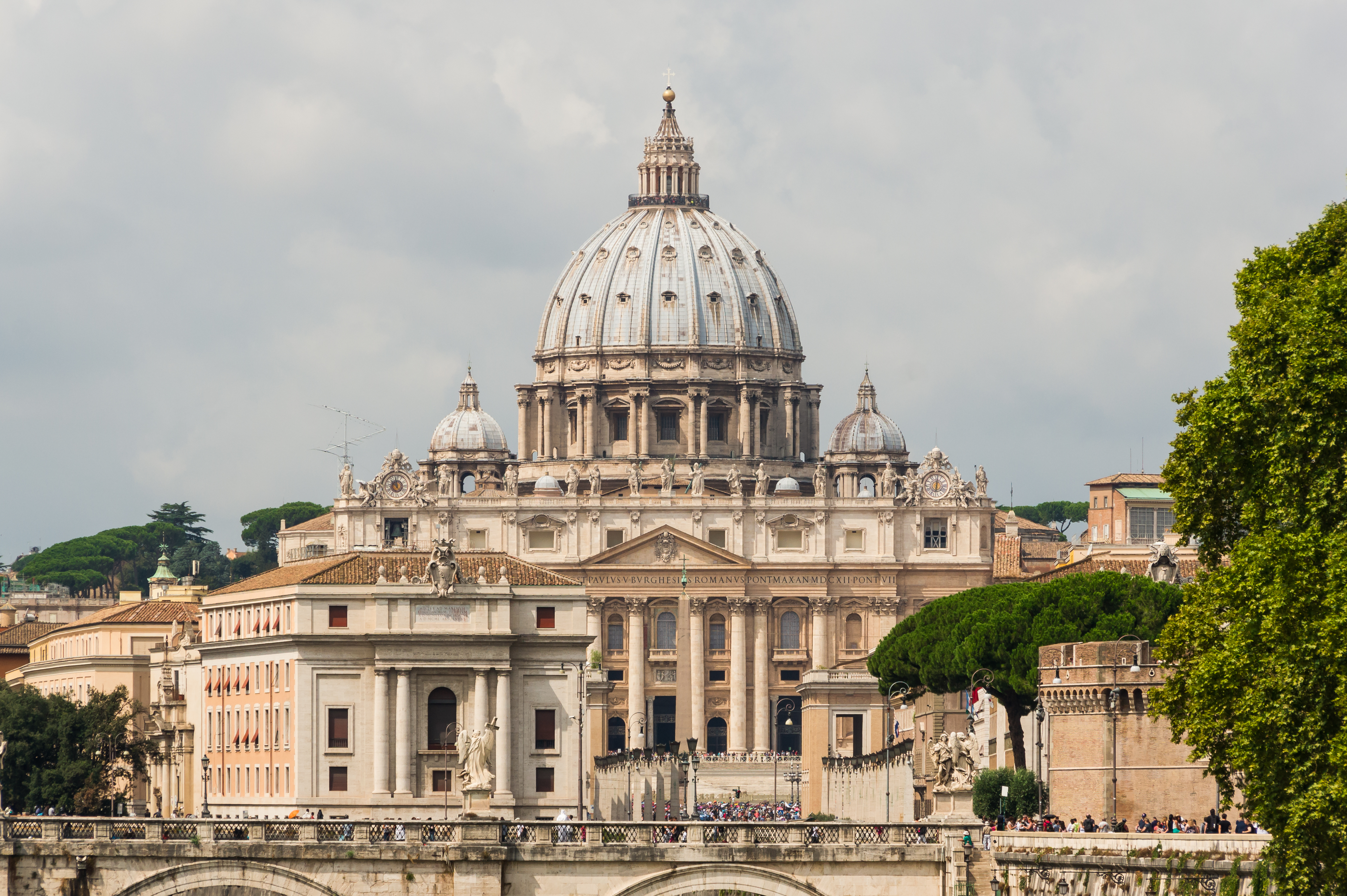
St. Peter's Basilica, a representation of Renaissance and Baroque architecture

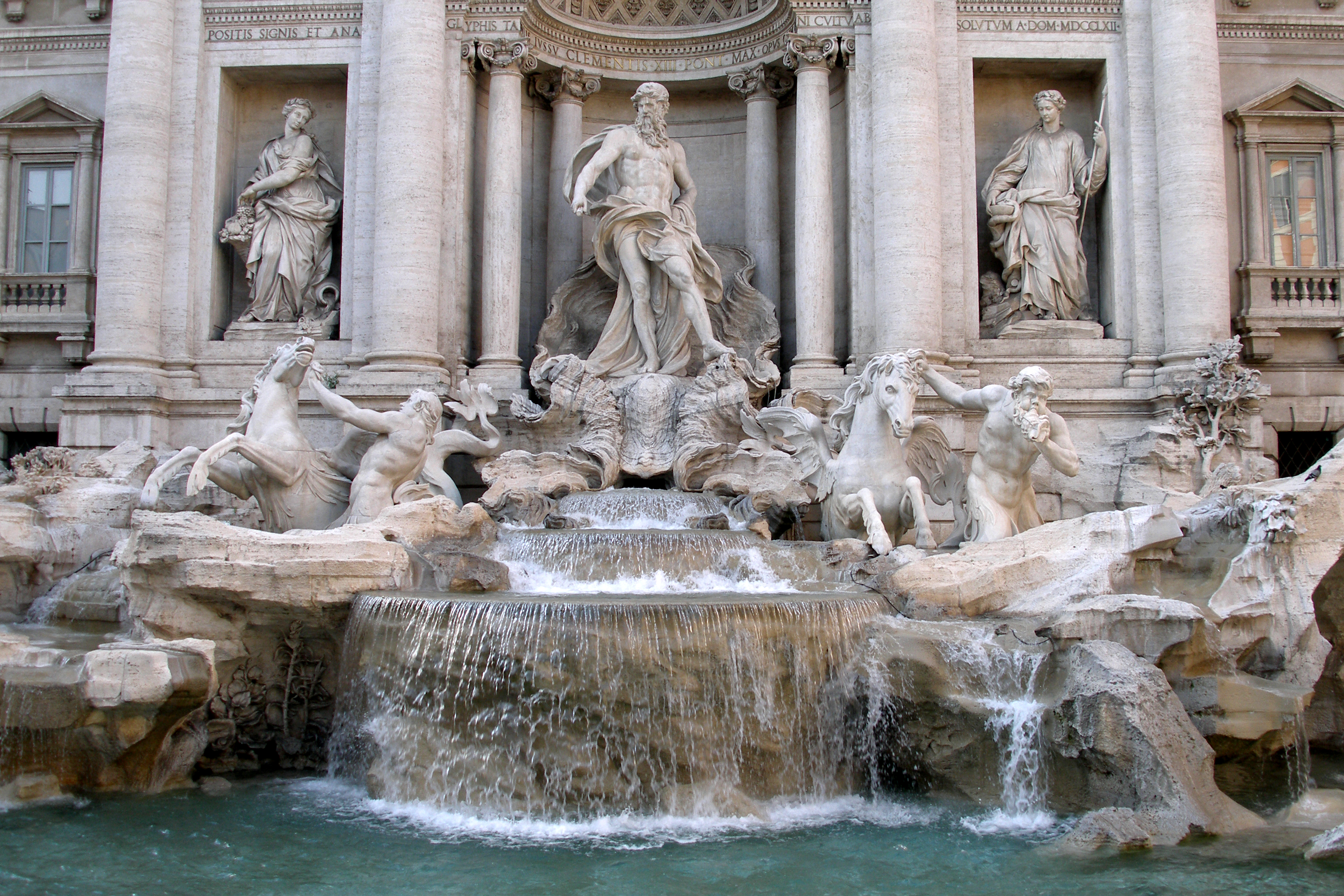
The Trevi Fountain in Rome

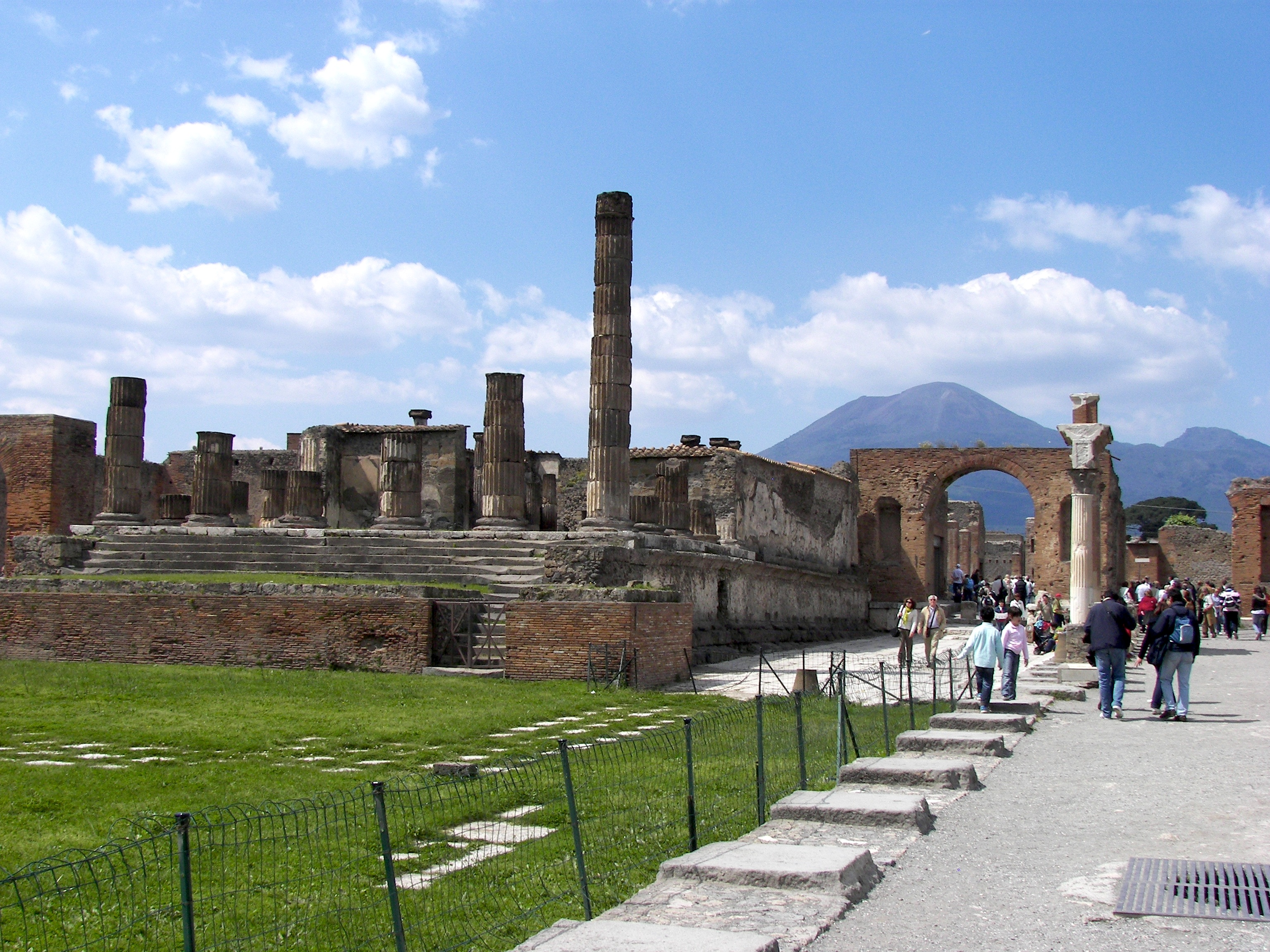
The Forum of Pompeii with Vesuvius in the distance

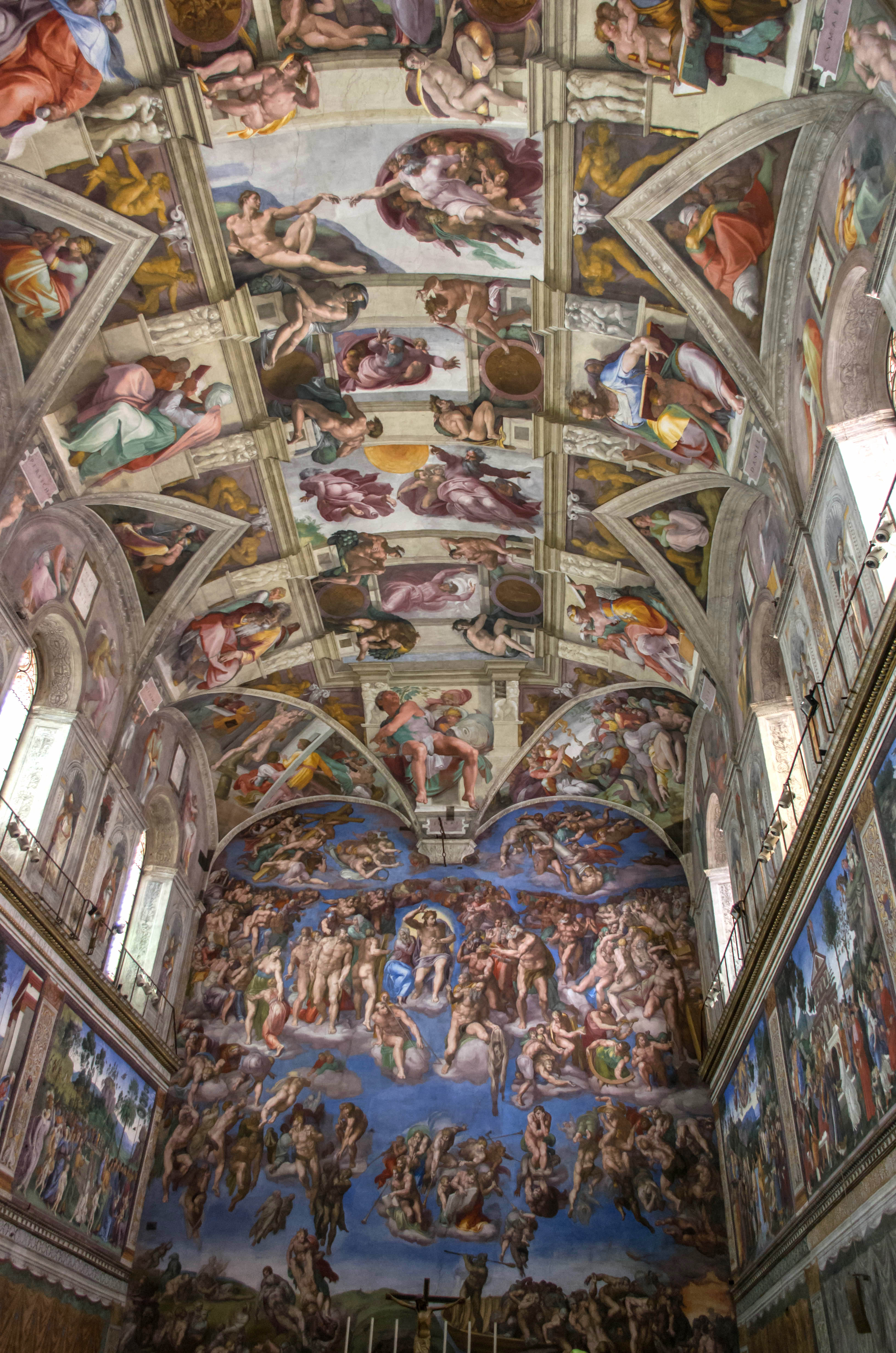
The Sistine Chapel ceiling, with frescos done by Michelangelo

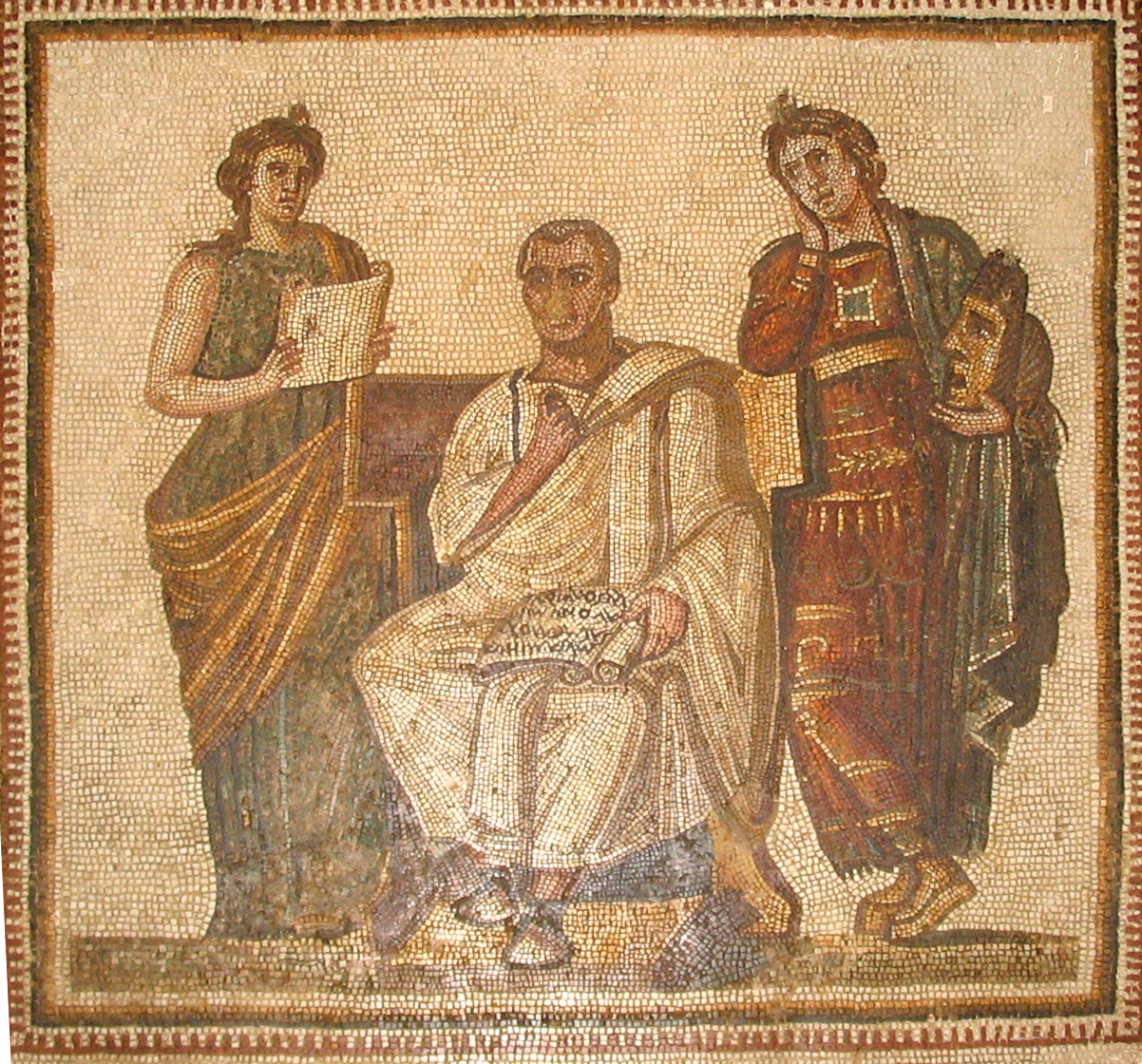
Roman mosaic of Virgil, the most important Latin poet of the Augustan period

The culture of Italy encompasses the knowledge, beliefs, arts, laws, customs, and social practices associated with the Italian Peninsula and, later, the modern Italian state. Italy has had a significant influence on the development of Western culture and civilisation.

The Italian Peninsula was the center of Roman civilisation, which contributed to the spread of Roman law, the Latin alphabet, the Latin language, and institutions that influenced later European societies. Italy was also an important center of the Roman Catholic Church, the Renaissance, the Baroque, Neoclassicism, Futurism, and Fascism. Italian scholars, artists, merchants, explorers, and political movements also contributed to wider European developments such as the Romanesque, Scholasticism, the Age of Discovery, the Scientific Revolution, and European integration.

Several institutions in Italy are among the earliest of their kind in Europe, including the Ospedale di Santo Spirito in Sassia, the University of Bologna, the Capitoline Museums, early modern banking institutions, and the Teatro San Cassiano. Italian culture has been influential in art, architecture, music, cinema, fashion, literature, theatre, science, and cuisine. Italy was central to the development of opera and has played an important role in classical music, with composers such as Antonio Vivaldi, Gioachino Rossini, and Giuseppe Verdi. Italian cultural history also includes contributions to ballet, folk dance, commedia dell'arte, and cinema.

== Arts ==
Leonardo da Vinci's Mona Lisa is an Italian art masterpiece famous worldwide.

Italian art has influenced major movements throughout the centuries and produced many great artists, including painters, architects, and sculptors. Today, Italy has an essential place in the international art scene, with several major art galleries, museums, and exhibitions; major artistic centres in the country include Rome, Florence, Venice, Milan, Turin, Genoa, Naples, Palermo, and other cities. Italy is home to 62 World Heritage Sites, the largest number of any country in the world.

Since ancient times, Greeks and Etruscans have inhabited the south, centre, and north of the Italian peninsula, respectively. The very numerous rock drawings in Valcamonica are as old as 8,000 BC, and there are rich remains of Etruscan art from thousands of tombs, as well as rich remains from the Greek cities at Paestum, Agrigento, and elsewhere. Ancient Rome finally emerged as the dominant Italian and European power. The Roman remains in Italy are of extraordinary richness, from the grand Imperial monuments of Rome itself to the survival of exceptionally preserved ordinary buildings in Pompeii and neighbouring sites. Following the fall of the Roman Empire, in the Middle Ages Italy remained an important centre, not only of the Carolingian art and Ottonian art of the Holy Roman Emperors, but for the Byzantine art of Ravenna and other sites.

Italy was the main centre of artistic developments throughout the Renaissance (1300–1600), beginning with the Proto-Renaissance of Giotto and reaching a particular peak in the High Renaissance of Leonardo da Vinci, Michelangelo, and Raphael, whose works inspired the later phase of the Renaissance, known as Mannerism. Italy retained its artistic dominance into the 17th century with the Baroque (1600–1750). Cultural tourism and Neoclassicism (1750–1850) became a major prop to an otherwise faltering economy. Both Baroque and Neoclassicism originated in Rome and were the last Italian-born styles that spread to all Western art.

However, Italy maintained a presence in the international art scene from the mid-19th century onwards, with cultural movements such as the Macchiaioli, Futurism, Metaphysical, Novecento Italiano, Spatialism, Arte Povera, and Transavantgarde.

=== Architecture ===
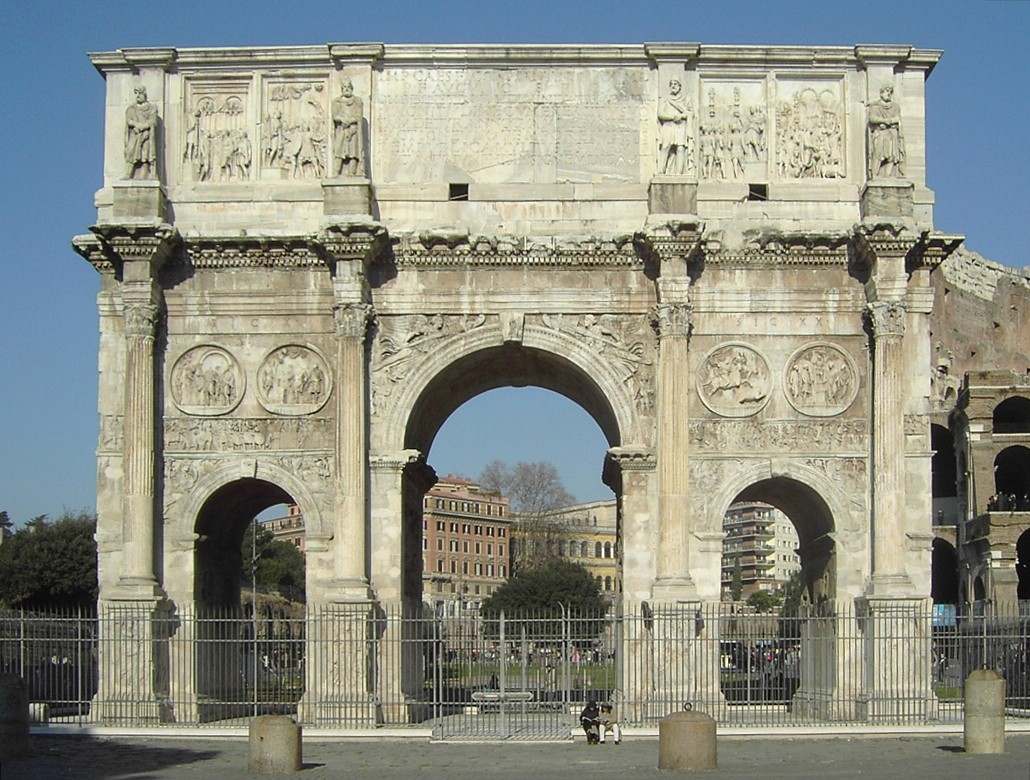
The Arch of Constantine in Rome

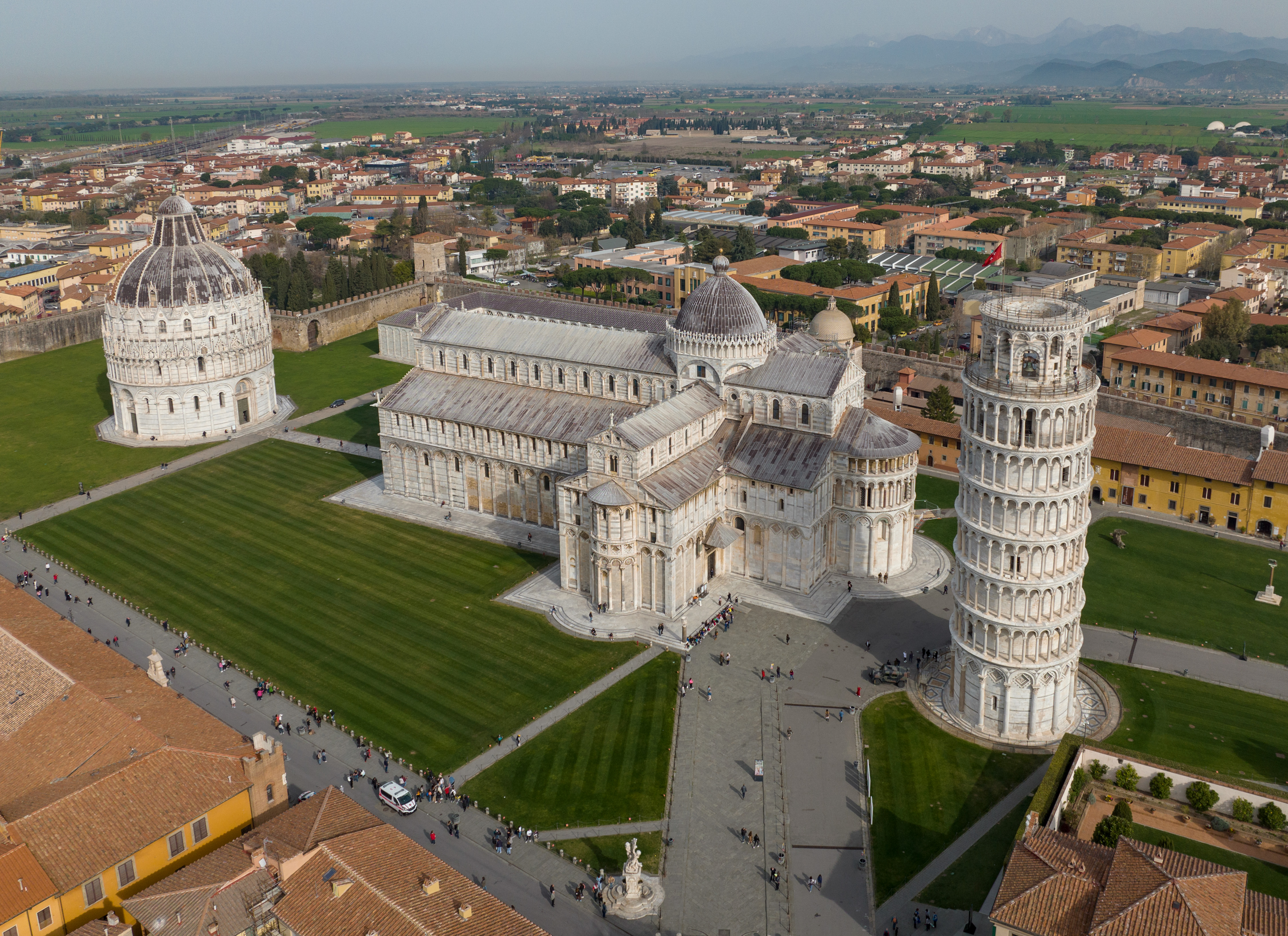
Pisa Cathedral and the Leaning Tower of Pisa

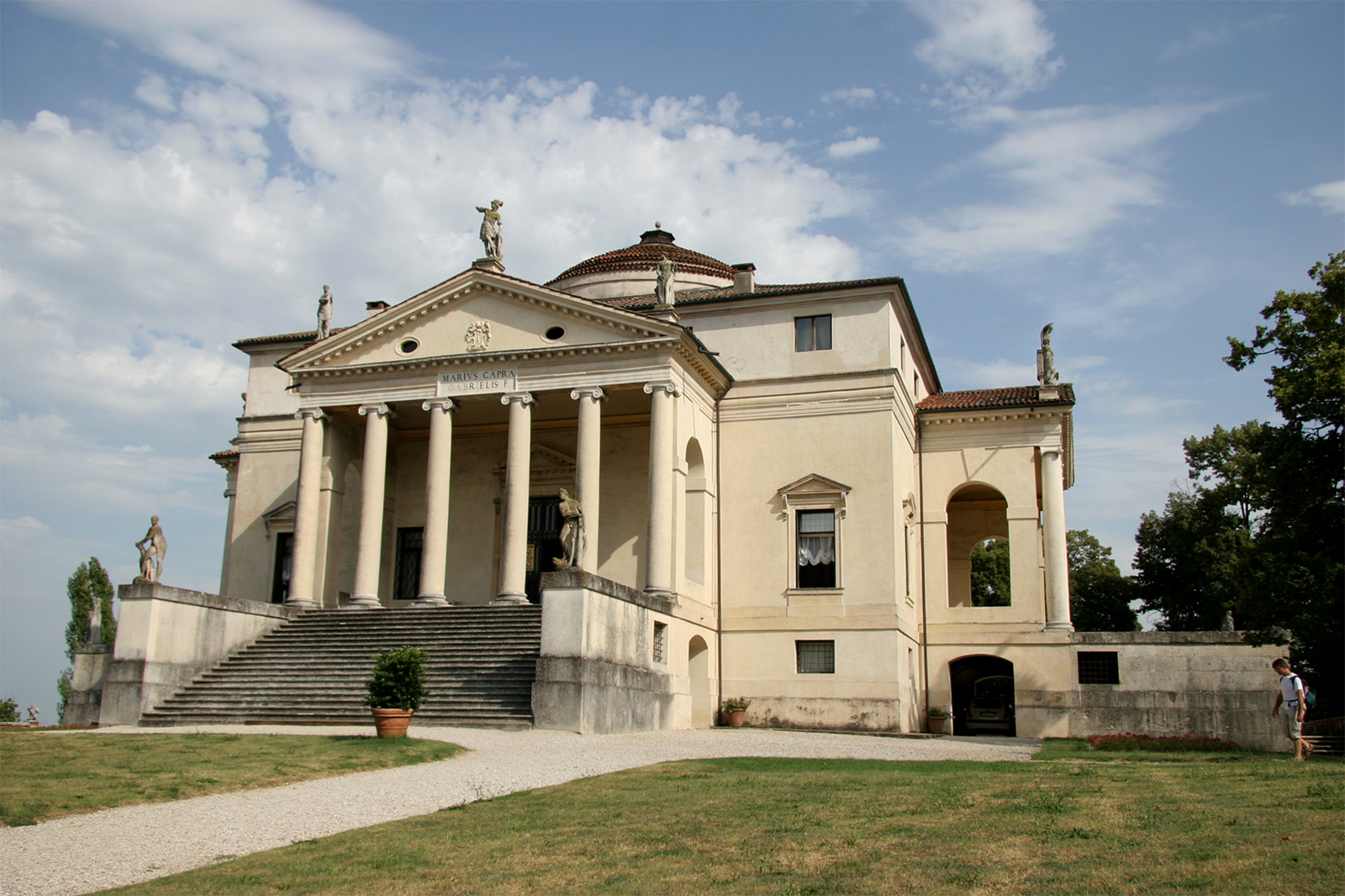
Villa La Rotonda, designed by Palladio

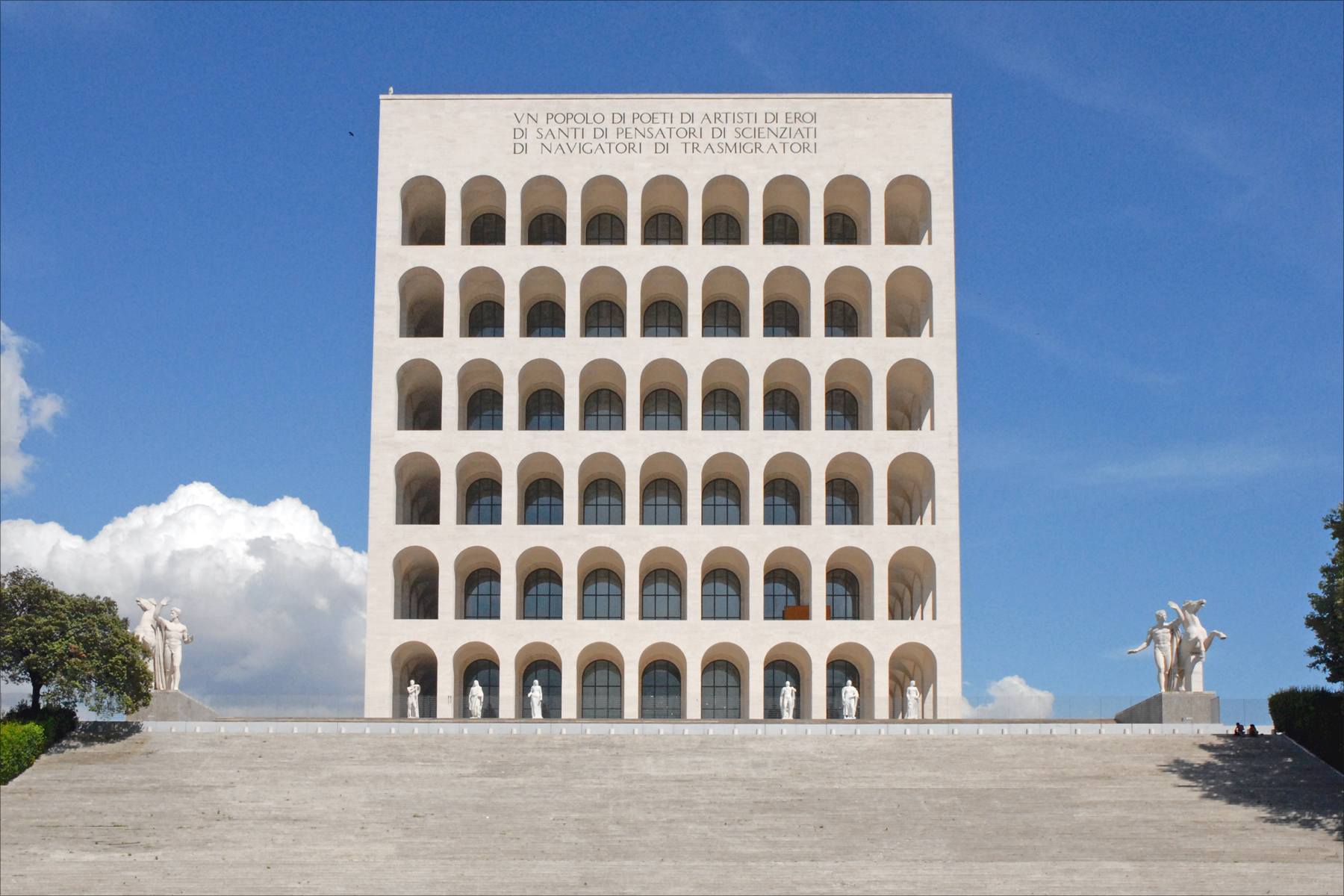
Palazzo della Civiltà Italiana, an example of modern architecture

Italy is renowned for its rich architectural heritage, from ancient Rome to modern design. Italian architects pioneered the use of arches, domes, and vaults, laid the foundations of Renaissance architecture, and inspired movements such as Palladianism and Neoclassicism. Italian cities are home to a wide range of historical styles that influenced the built environment worldwide.

==== Ancient and classical ====
Architecture in Italy began with Etruscan and Greek settlements, which influenced the development of Roman architecture. Roman achievements included aqueducts, amphitheatres, temples, and urban planning. The legacy of Roman engineering is visible in structures such as the Colosseum and the Pantheon, as well as in sites such as Pompeii.

==== Early Christian and Byzantine ====
With Christianity's spread, Roman forms were adapted into the basilica—long, rectangular churches richly decorated with mosaics. Ravenna became a center of Byzantine art and architecture, while Old St. Peter's Basilica, begun in the 4th century, set the template for medieval church design.

==== Romanesque and Gothic ====
Between the 9th and 12th centuries, Romanesque architecture flourished, marked by rounded arches, vaults, and elaborate cloisters. Notable examples include the Leaning Tower of Pisa and the Basilica of Sant'Ambrogio in Milan.

==== Renaissance and Baroque ====
The Italian Renaissance (14th–16th centuries) revived classical forms and emphasised symmetry and proportion. Filippo Brunelleschi's dome for Florence Cathedral and Donato Bramante's work on St. Peter's Basilica exemplify this era's innovations. Andrea Palladio's harmonious villas in the Veneto region, such as the Villa La Rotonda, became a model for Western architecture.

In the 17th century, Baroque architecture emerged, emphasising grandeur and theatricality, as seen in churches and palaces throughout Rome and Naples. The style continued into Rococo and was later tempered by the classical restraint of Neoclassicism.

=== Cinema ===
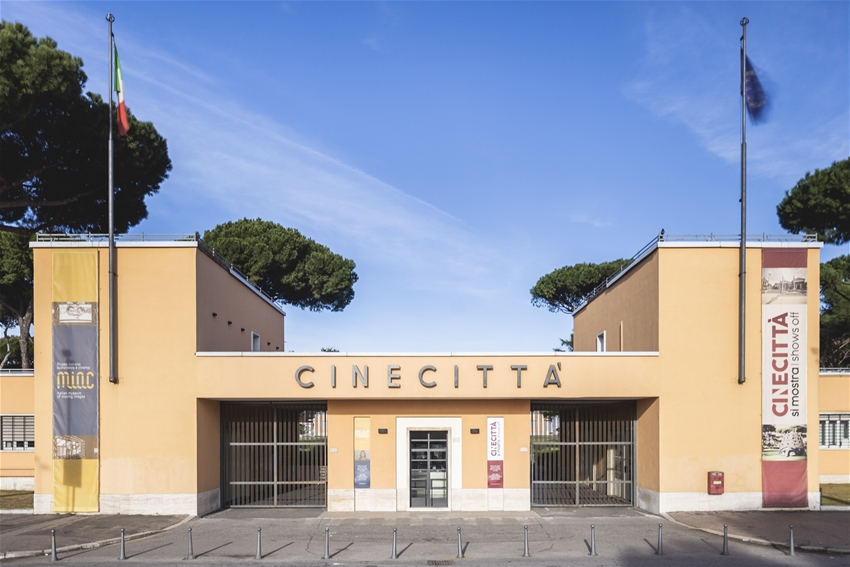
Entrance to Cinecittà in Rome, the largest film studio in Europe

The history of Italian cinema began a few months after the Lumière brothers began motion picture exhibitions. The first Italian director is considered to be Vittorio Calcina, a collaborator of the Lumière Brothers, who filmed Pope Leo XIII in 1896. In the 1910s the Italian film industry developed rapidly. In 1912, the year of the greatest expansion, 569 films were produced in Turin, 420 in Rome and 120 in Milan. Cabiria, a 1914 Italian epic film directed by Giovanni Pastrone, is considered the most famous Italian silent film. It was also the first film in history to be shown in the White House. The oldest European avant-garde cinema movement, Italian futurism, took place in the late 1910s.

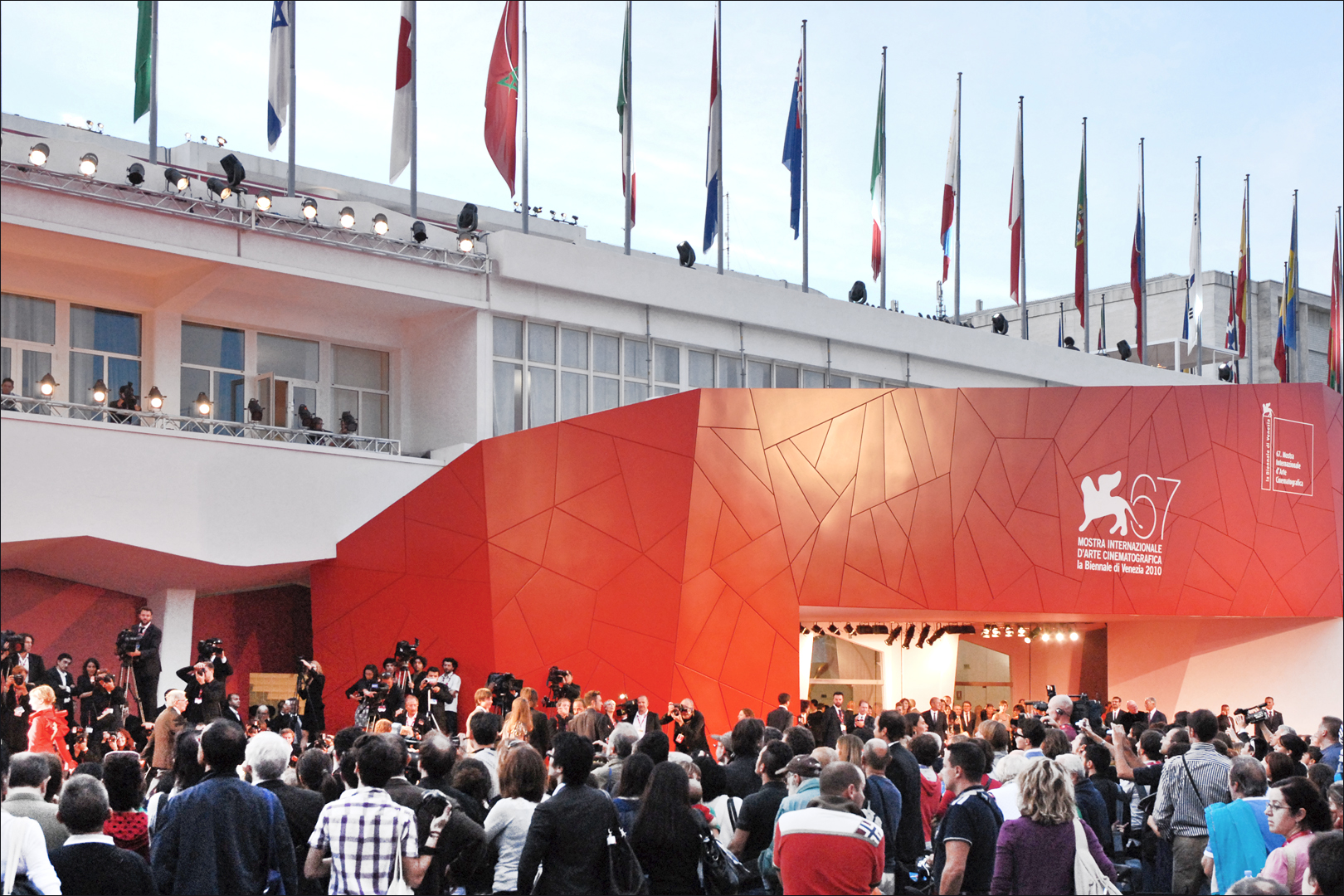
The Venice Film Festival is the oldest film festival in the world.

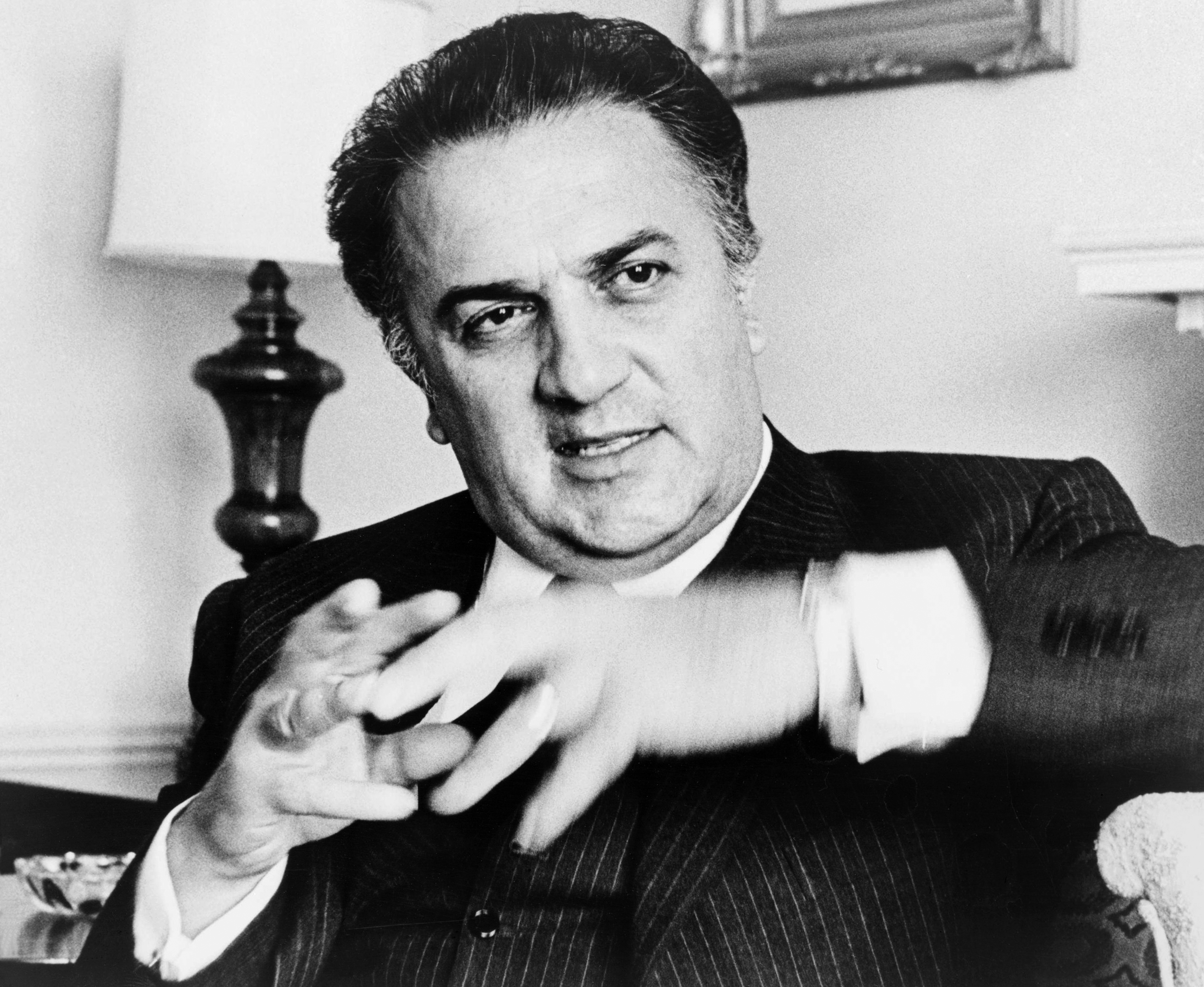
Federico Fellini, considered one of the most influential and widely revered filmmakers in the history of cinema

After a period of decline in the 1920s, the Italian film industry was revitalised in the 1930s with the arrival of sound film. A popular Italian genre during this period, the Telefoni Bianchi, consisted of comedies with glamorous backgrounds. Calligrafismo was instead in a sharp contrast to Telefoni Bianchi-American style comedies and is rather artistic, highly formalistic, expressive in complexity, and deals mainly with contemporary literary material. Cinema was later used by Benito Mussolini, who founded Rome's renowned Cinecittà studio also for the production of Fascist propaganda until World War II.

After the war, Italian film was widely recognised and exported until an artistic decline around the 1980s. Notable Italian film directors from this period include Federico Fellini, Sergio Leone, Pier Paolo Pasolini, Duccio Tessari, Luchino Visconti, Vittorio De Sica, Michelangelo Antonioni, and Roberto Rossellini; some of these are recognised among the greatest and most influential filmmakers of all time. Films include world cinema treasures such as Bicycle Thieves, La dolce vita, 8½, The Good, the Bad and the Ugly, and Once Upon a Time in the West. The mid-1940s to the early 1950s was the heyday of neorealist films, reflecting the poor condition of post-war Italy.

As the country grew wealthier in the 1950s, a form of neorealism known as pink neorealism succeeded, and starting from the 1950s through the commedia all'italiana genre, and other film genres, such as sword-and-sandal followed as spaghetti Westerns, were popular in the 1960s and 1970s. Actresses such as Sophia Loren, Giulietta Masina, and Gina Lollobrigida achieved international stardom during this period. Erotic Italian thrillers, or gialli, produced by directors such as Mario Bava and Dario Argento in the 1970s, also influenced the horror genre worldwide. In recent years, the Italian scene has received only occasional international attention, with films such as Cinema Paradiso, written and directed by Giuseppe Tornatore; Mediterraneo, directed by Gabriele Salvatores; Il Postino: The Postman, with Massimo Troisi; Life Is Beautiful, directed by Roberto Benigni; and The Great Beauty, directed by Paolo Sorrentino.

The aforementioned Cinecittà studio is today the largest film and television production facility in Europe, where many international box office hits were filmed. In the 1950s, the number of international productions being made there led to Rome's being dubbed "Hollywood on the Tiber". More than 3,000 productions have been made on its lot, of which 90 received an Academy Award nomination and 47 of these won it, from some cinema classics to recent rewarded features (such as Roman Holiday, Ben-Hur, Cleopatra, Romeo and Juliet, The English Patient, The Passion of the Christ, and Gangs of New York).

Italy is the most awarded country at the Academy Awards for Best Foreign Language Film, with 14 awards won, 3 Special Awards, and 28 nominations. As of 2016, Italian films have also won 12 Palmes d'Or, 11 Golden Lions, and 7 Golden Bears. The list of the 100 Italian films to be saved was created with the aim to report "100 films that have changed the collective memory of the country between 1942 and 1978".

=== Comics ===
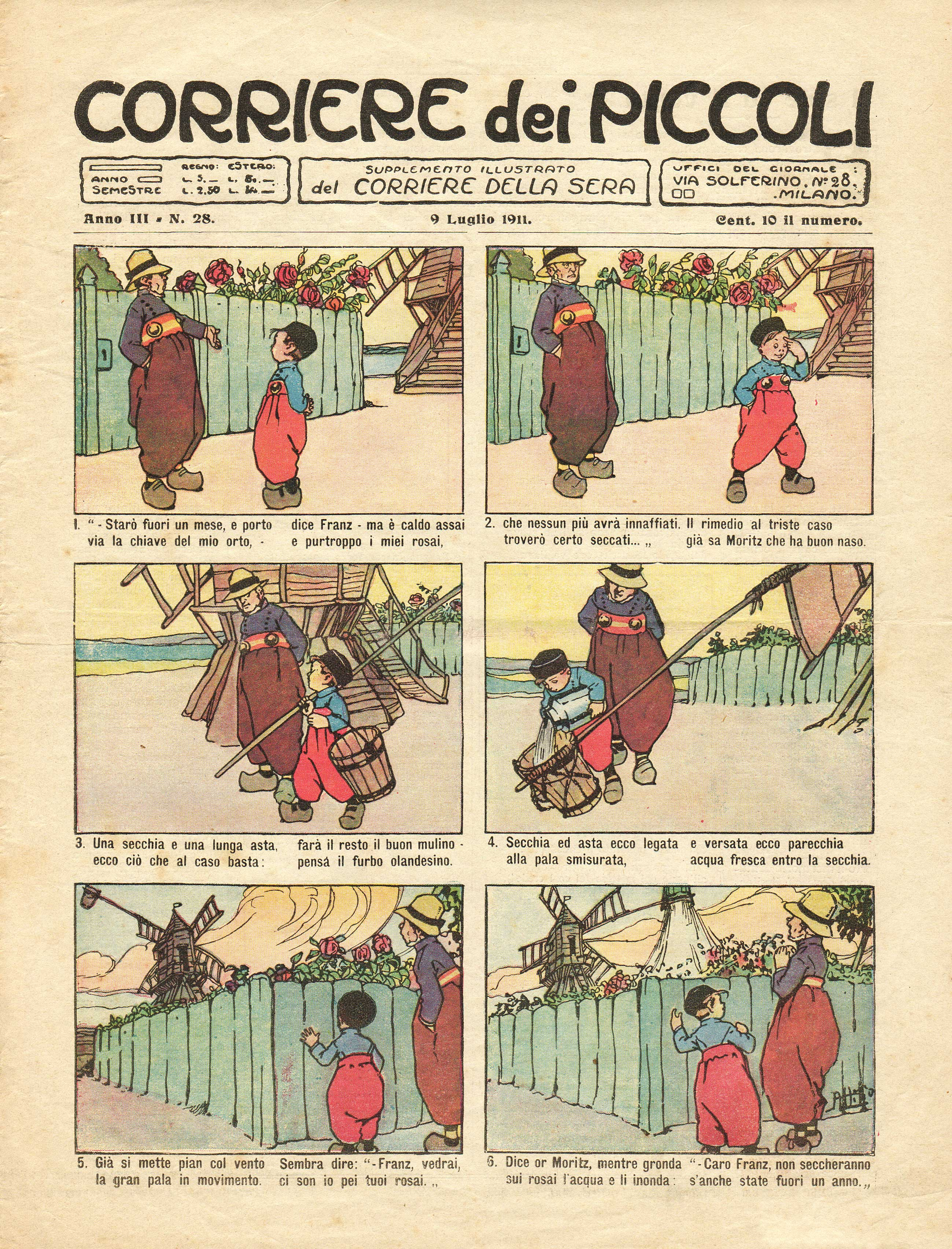
Cover of Corriere dei Piccoli, 11 July 1911, with a strip in the Italian style (no speech bubbles).

Italian comics (Fumetti) officially began on 27 December 1908 with the first issue of Corriere dei Piccoli. Attilio Mussino contributed various characters, including Bilbolbul, a little Black child whose surreal adventures unfolded in a fantastical Africa.

In 1932, publisher Lotario Vecchi launched Jumbo, featuring only North American authors. With a circulation of 350,000, it cemented comics as a mainstream medium in Italy. Vecchi later brought the title to Spain.

That same year, the first Italian Disney comic, Topolino (Mickey Mouse), debuted, published by Nerbini in Florence. In 1935, Mondadori's subsidiary API took over the franchise.

In 1945, Hugo Pratt, with Mario Faustinelli and Alberto Ongaro, created Asso di Picche while at the Venice Academy of Fine Arts. Their distinct style earned them recognition as the Venetian school of comics.

In 1948, Gian Luigi Bonelli launched the successful Western series Tex Willer, which became the prototype for Bonelliani—adventure comics in digest format. Later series included Zagor (1961), Mister No (1975), Martin Mystère (1982), and Dylan Dog (1986). These focused on adventure themes—Western, horror, mystery, or science fiction—and remain the most popular comic format in Italy.

Italy also produces many Disney comics, featuring characters from the Mickey Mouse universe and Scrooge McDuck universe. After the 1960s, American output declined, and Italy (alongside Denmark and South America) became a key producer. The Italian 'Scuola disneyana' introduced several innovations: a standard story length (30 pages), literary parodies, and long-form stories of up to 400 pages.

Notable Disney artists include Bonvi, Marco Rota, Romano Scarpa, Giorgio Cavazzano, Giovan Battista Carpi, and Guido Martina. The best-known Italian Disney character is Paperinik (Duck Avenger or Phantom Duck).

Italy also produces children's and teen comics, including Gormiti (based on a toy line), and Angel's Friends and Winx Club, both tied to popular animated series.

=== Dance ===
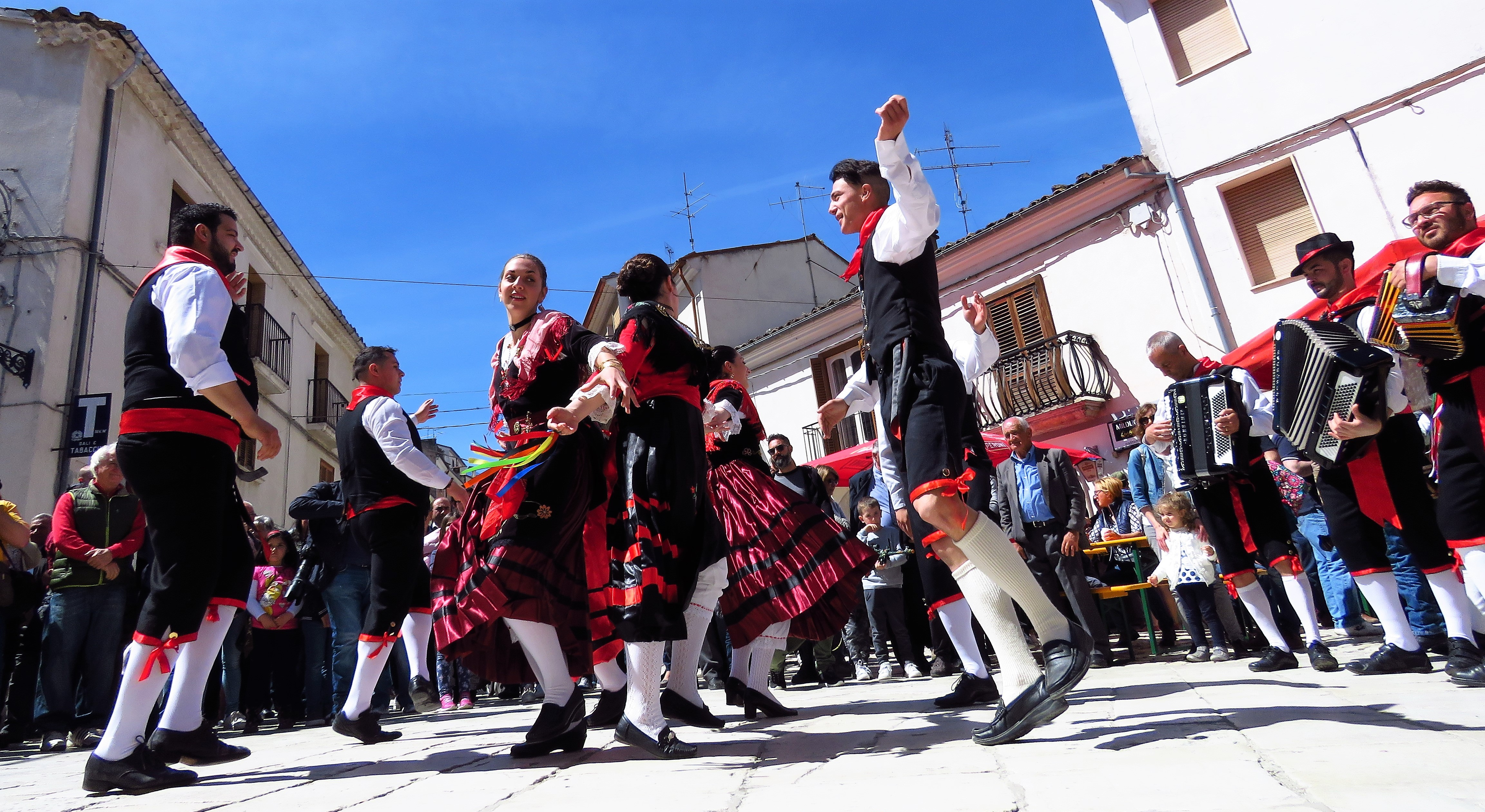
Italian folk dance in Molise

Italian folk dance has been an integral part of Italian culture for centuries. Dance has been a continuous thread in Italian life from Dante through the Renaissance, the advent of the tarantella in southern Italy, and the modern revivals of folk music and dance. One of the earliest attempts to systematically collect folk dances is Gaspare Ungarelli's 1894 work Le vecchie danze italiane ancora in uso nella provincia bolognese ('Old Italian dances still in use in the province of Bologna') which gives brief descriptions and music for some 30 dances. An interest in preserving and fostering folk art, music and dance among Italian Americans and the dedication and leadership of Elba Farabegoli Gurzau led to the formation of the Italian Folk Art Federation of America (IFAFA) in May 1979. The group sponsors an annual conference and has published a newsletter, Tradizioni, since 1980.

=== Fashion and design ===
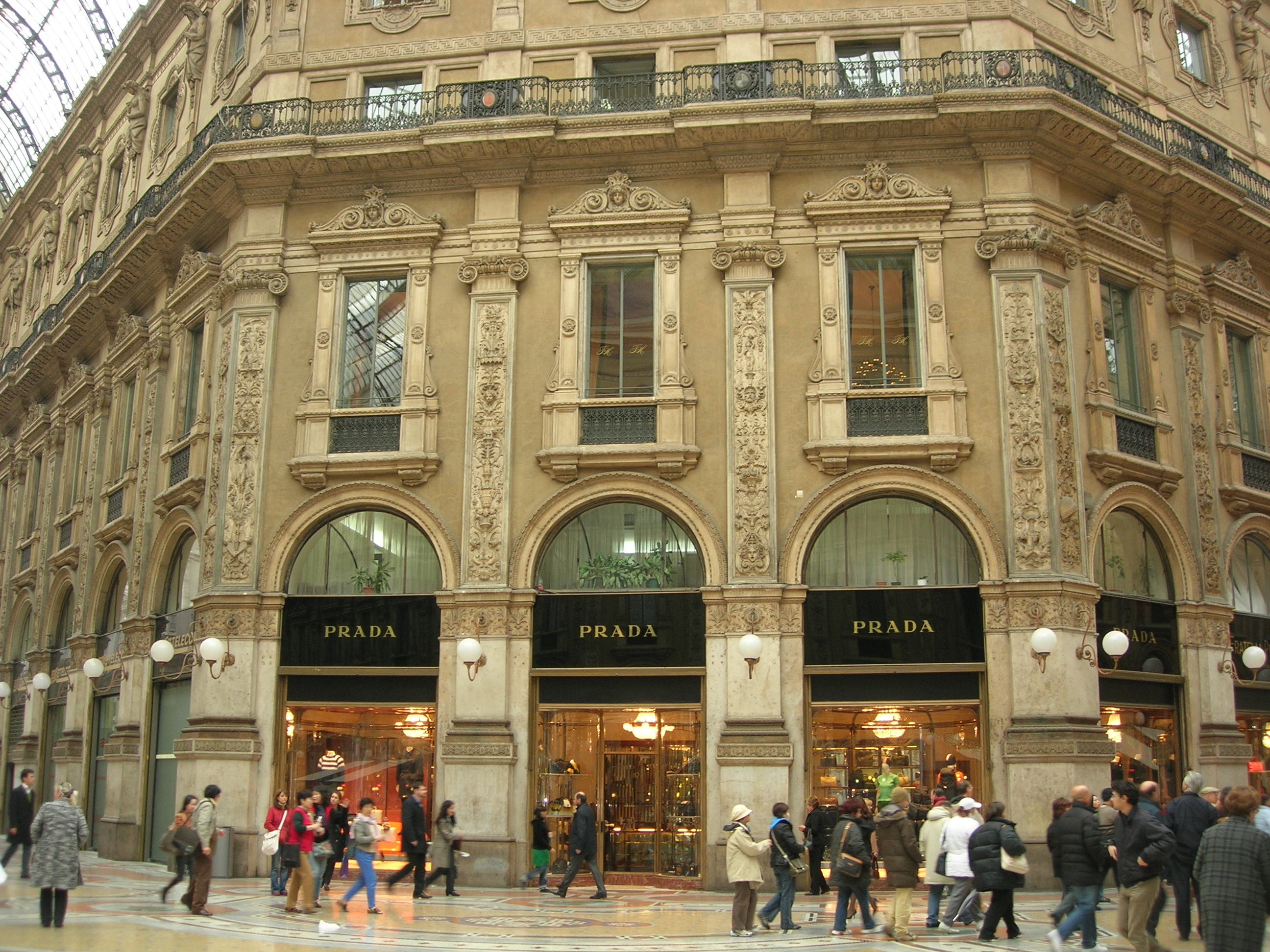
Prada shop at Galleria Vittorio Emanuele II in Milan

Italian fashion has a long tradition. Milan, Florence and Rome are Italy's main fashion capitals. According to Top Global Fashion Capital Rankings 2013 by Global Language Monitor, Rome ranked sixth worldwide while Milan was twelfth. Previously, in 2009, Milan was declared as the "fashion capital of the world" by Global Language Monitor itself. Currently, Milan and Rome, annually compete with other major international centres, such as Paris, New York, London, and Tokyo.

The Italian fashion industry is one of the country's most important manufacturing sectors. The majority of the older Italian couturiers are based in Rome. However, Milan is seen as the fashion capital of Italy because many well-known designers are based there and it is the venue for the Italian designer collections. Major Italian fashion labels, such as Gucci, Armani, Prada, Versace, Valentino, Dolce & Gabbana, Missoni, Fendi, Moschino, Max Mara, Trussardi, Benetton, and Ferragamo, to name a few, are regarded as among the finest fashion houses in the world.

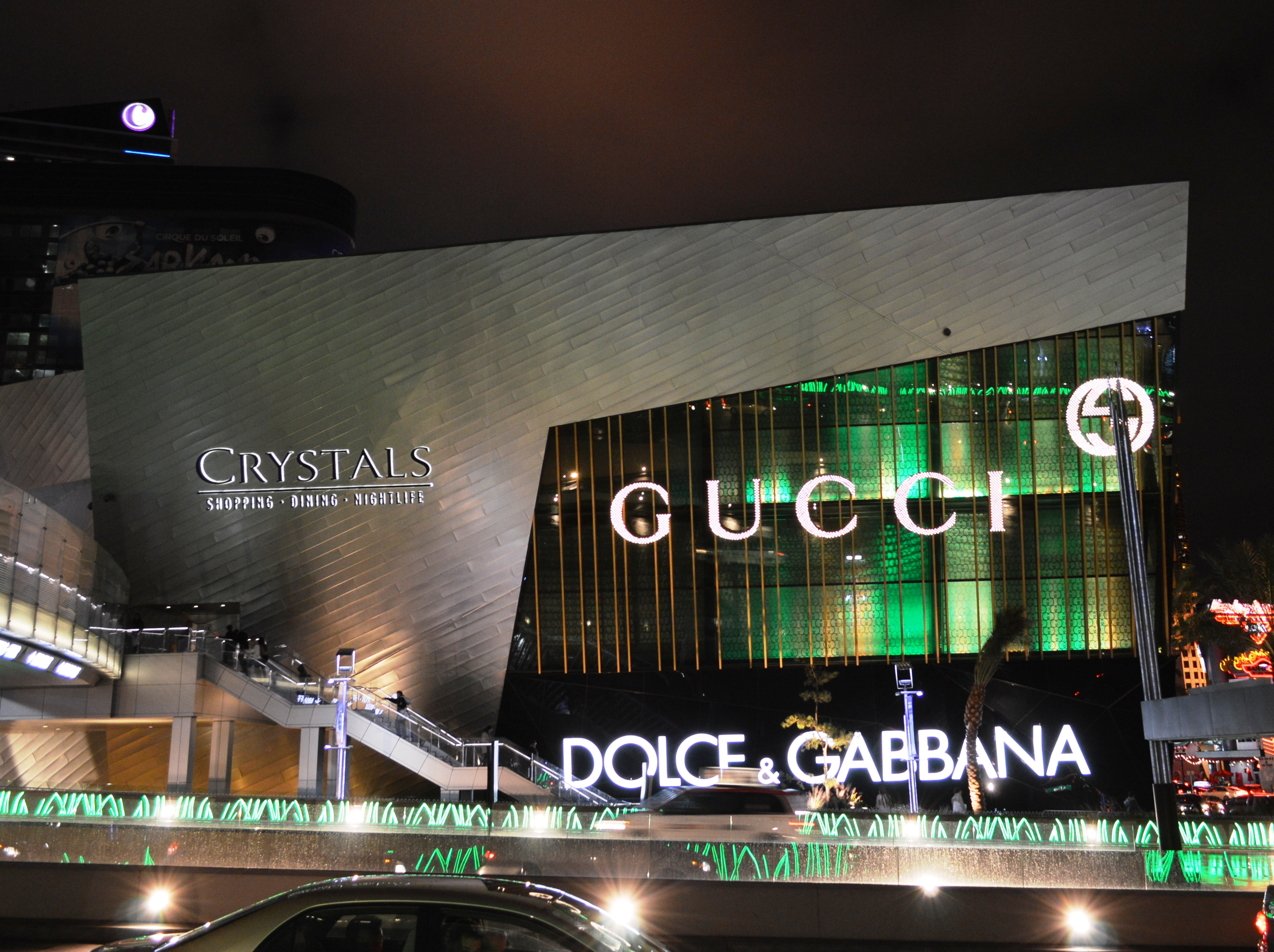
Gucci and Dolce & Gabbana Store on the Las Vegas Strip in Las Vegas

Italian accessory and jewellery companies include Bulgari, Luxottica, and Buccellati. Luxottica is one of the world's largest eyewear companies. The fashion magazine Vogue Italia is the Italian edition of Vogue. Emerging fashion designers are also supported through initiatives such as the ITS fashion design competition in Trieste.

Italy is also prominent in the field of design, notably interior design, architectural design, industrial design, and urban design. The country has produced some well-known furniture designers, such as Gio Ponti and Ettore Sottsass, and Italian phrases such as Bel Disegno and Linea Italiana have entered the vocabulary of furniture design. Examples of classic pieces of Italian white goods and pieces of furniture include Zanussi's washing machines and fridges, the "New Tone" sofas by Atrium, and the post-modern bookcase by Ettore Sottsass, inspired by Bob Dylan's song "Stuck Inside of Mobile with the Memphis Blues Again".

Italy is recognised as a worldwide trendsetter and leader in design. Italy today still exerts a vast influence on urban design, industrial design, interior design, and fashion design worldwide. Today, Milan and Turin are the nation's leaders in architectural design and industrial design. The city of Milan hosts the FieraMilano, Europe's biggest design fair. Milan also hosts major design and architecture-related events and venues, such as the Fuori Salone and the Salone del Mobile, and has been home to the designers Bruno Munari, Lucio Fontana, Enrico Castellani, and Piero Manzoni.

=== Literature ===
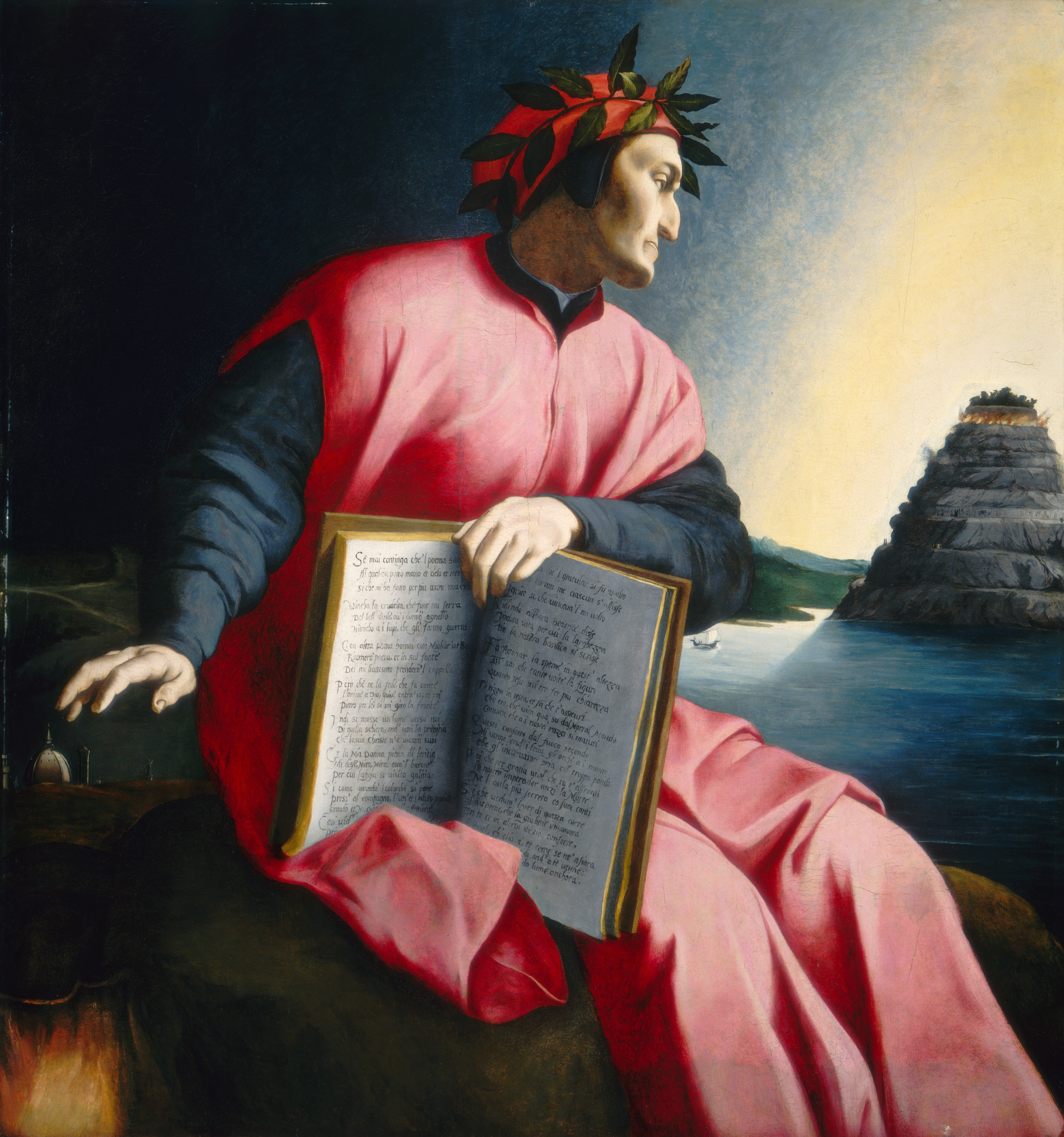
Dante Alighieri, whose works helped establish modern Italian language, is considered one of the greatest poets of the Middle Ages. His epic poem Divine Comedy ranks among the finest works of world literature.

Formal Latin literature began in 240 BC with the first stage play performed in Rome. Latin literature has remained highly influential, with notable writers such as Pliny the Elder, Pliny the Younger, Virgil, Horace, Propertius, Ovid, and Livy. The Romans were also known for their oral tradition, poetry, drama, and epigrams. In the early 13th century, Francis of Assisi was considered by literary critics as the first Italian poet, with his religious song Canticle of the Sun.

A literary movement also emerged in 13th-century Sicily, at the court of Emperor Frederick II, where lyrics inspired by Provençal themes were composed in a refined vernacular. Among the poets was notary Giacomo da Lentini, credited with inventing the sonnet, although the most famous early sonneteer was Petrarch.

Guido Guinizelli is regarded as the founder of the Dolce Stil Novo, a school that introduced a philosophical approach to love poetry. Its pure style influenced Guido Cavalcanti and Dante Alighieri, whose works helped establish modern Italian. Dante's masterpiece, Divine Comedy, is considered one of the finest literary achievements worldwide; he also developed the intricate poetic form known as terza rima.

The 14th century saw Petrarch and Giovanni Boccaccio imitate classical models while cultivating individual artistic voices. Petrarch's collection Il Canzoniere became a cornerstone of lyric poetry, while Boccaccio's The Decameron remains one of the most celebrated short story collections.

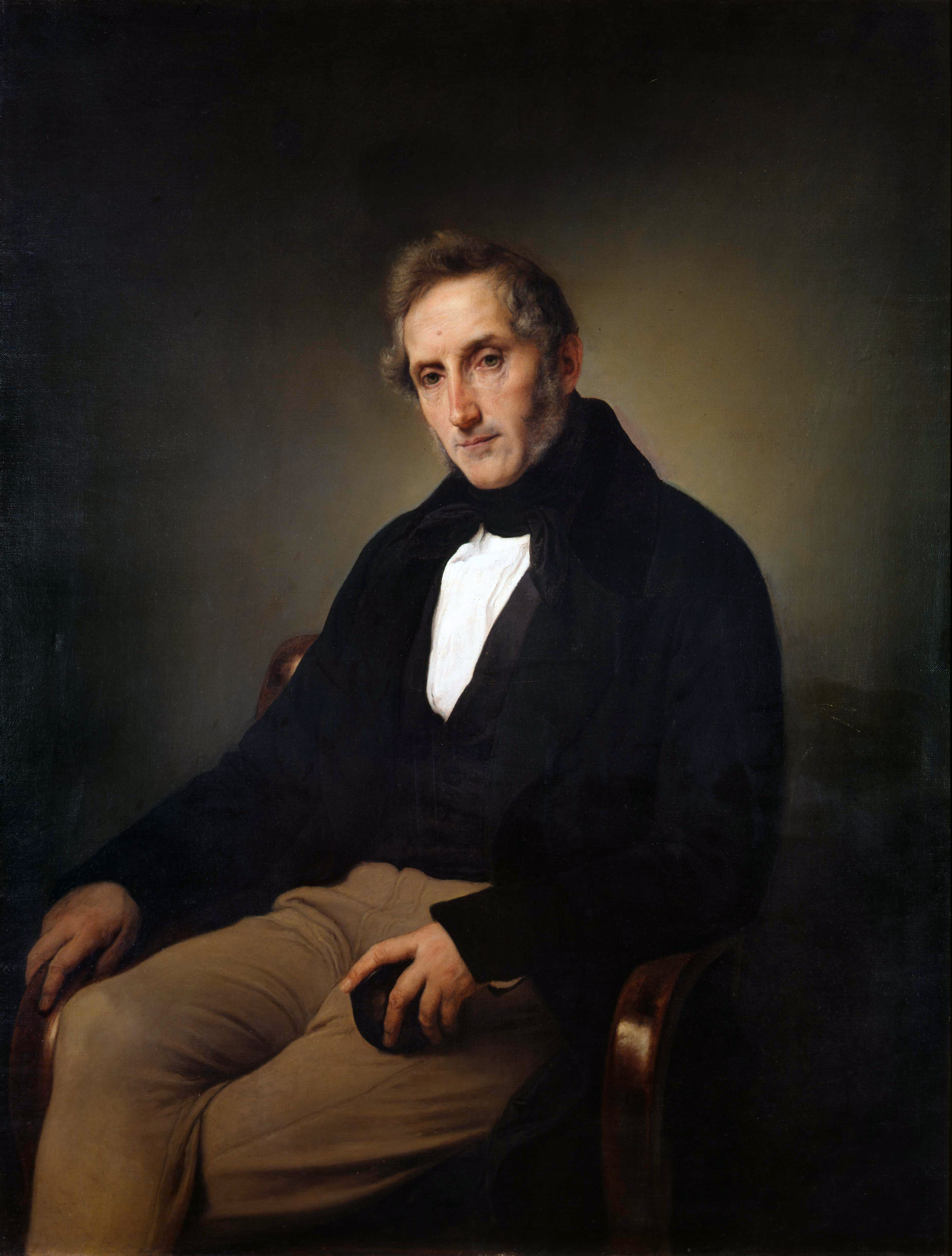
Alessandro Manzoni is famous for the novel The Betrothed (1827), generally ranked among the masterpieces of world literature. He contributed to the nationwide use of the Italian language.

Renaissance authors such as Niccolò Machiavelli wrote enduring works such as The Prince, a realist treatise on power. Ludovico Ariosto continued the chivalric romance with Orlando Furioso, and Baldassare Castiglione outlined the ideal courtier in The Book of the Courtier. Torquato Tasso's epic Jerusalem Delivered blended Christian themes with classical form, adhering to Aristotelian unity.

Italian writers also pioneered the fairy tale genre. Giovanni Francesco Straparola's The Facetious Nights of Straparola (1550–1555) and Giambattista Basile's Pentamerone (1634) are among the earliest printed fairy tales in Europe.

In the early 17th century, Giambattista Marino's mythological poem L'Adone exemplified Baroque excess, while Galileo Galilei pioneered clear scientific prose. Tommaso Campanella's The City of the Sun envisioned a utopian society. Later, the Academy of Arcadia promoted classical simplicity, seen in Metastasio's heroic melodramas. In the 18th century, playwright Carlo Goldoni modernised Italian theatre with realistic depictions of the middle class.

Romanticism aligned with the Risorgimento, Italy's unification movement. Poets such as Vittorio Alfieri, Ugo Foscolo, and Giacomo Leopardi championed patriotic and philosophical themes. Alessandro Manzoni, the leading Romantic, advanced a unified literary language with his novel The Betrothed, which glorifies Christian ideals and remains a landmark in Italian literature.

In the late 19th century, the realist movement Verismo emerged, led by Giovanni Verga and Luigi Capuana. At the same time, Emilio Salgari published popular adventure novels, including the Sandokan series. In 1883, Carlo Collodi released The Adventures of Pinocchio, now among the most translated non-religious books globally.

In the early 20th century, Futurism introduced experimental language glorifying speed and modernity, exemplified by Filippo Tommaso Marinetti's Manifesto of Futurism.

Modern literary figures include Gabriele D'Annunzio; Nobel laureates Giosuè Carducci (1906), Grazia Deledda (1926), Luigi Pirandello (1936), Salvatore Quasimodo (1959), Eugenio Montale (1975), and Dario Fo (1997); and internationally acclaimed writers such as Italo Calvino and Umberto Eco.

=== Music ===
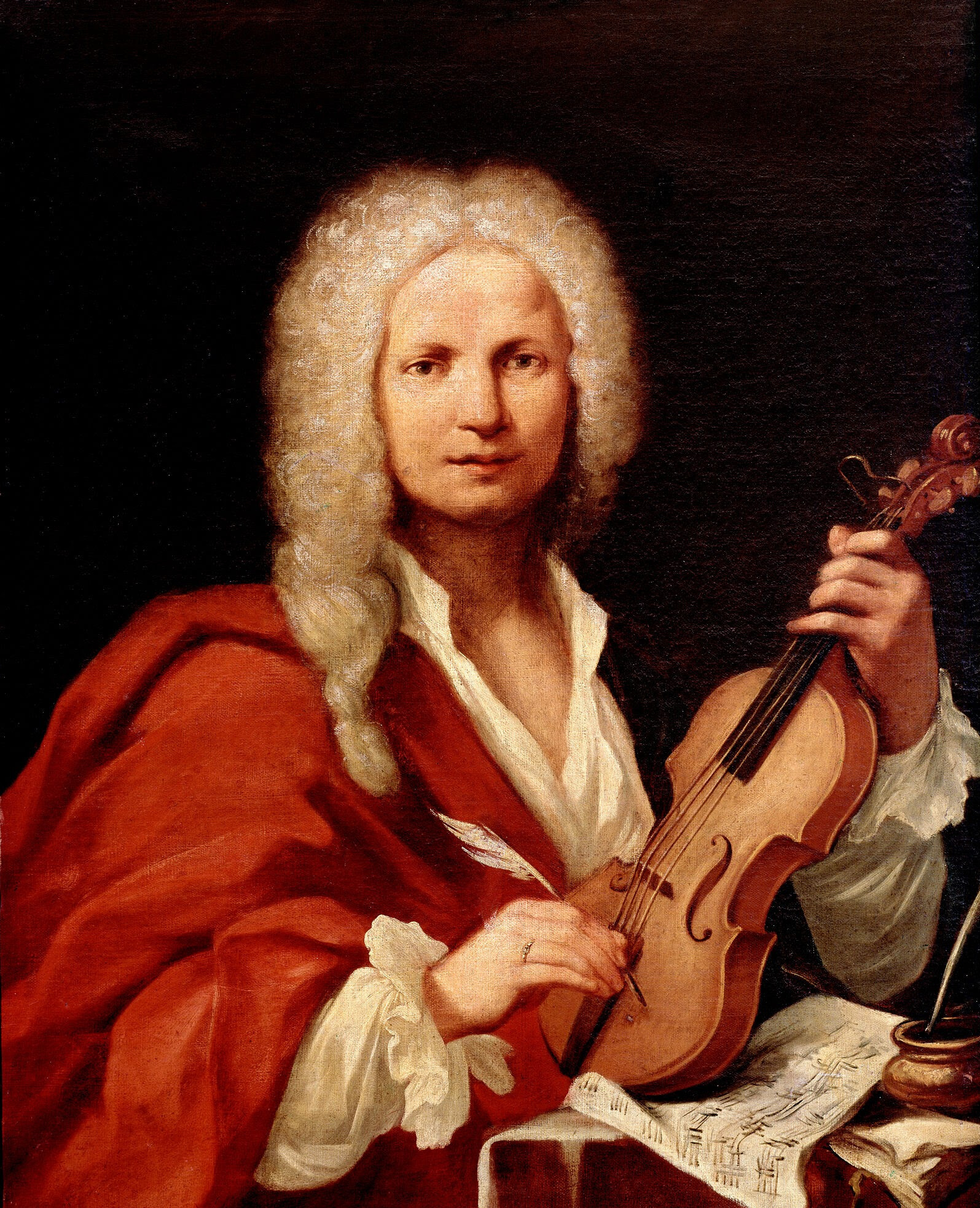
Antonio Vivaldi, in 1723. His best-known work is a series of violin concertos known as The Four Seasons.

From folk music to classical, music is an intrinsic part of Italian culture. Instruments associated with classical music, including the piano and violin, were invented in Italy, and many of the prevailing classical music forms, such as the symphony, concerto, and sonata, can trace their roots back to innovations of 16th- and 17th-century Italian music.

Italy's most famous composers include the Renaissance composers Palestrina, Monteverdi and Gesualdo, the Baroque composers Scarlatti, Corelli and Vivaldi, the Classical composers Paisiello, Paganini and Rossini, and the Romantic composers Verdi and Puccini. Modern Italian composers such as Berio and Nono proved significant in the development of experimental and electronic music. While the classical music tradition still holds strong in Italy, as evidenced by the fame of its innumerable opera houses, such as La Scala of Milan and San Carlo of Naples (the oldest continuously active venue for public opera in the world), and performers such as the pianist Maurizio Pollini and tenor Luciano Pavarotti, Italians have been no less appreciative of their thriving contemporary music scene.

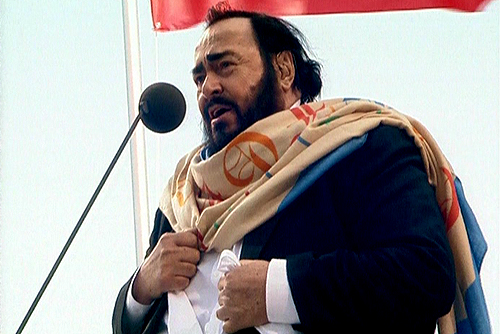
Luciano Pavarotti, considered one of the finest tenors of the 20th century and the "King of the High Cs"

Italy is widely known for being the birthplace of opera. Italian opera was believed to have been founded in the early 17th century, in cities such as Mantua and Venice. Later, works and pieces composed by native Italian composers of the 19th and early 20th centuries, such as Rossini, Bellini, Donizetti, Verdi, and Puccini, are among the most famous operas ever written and today are performed in opera houses across the world. La Scala opera house in Milan is also renowned as one of the best in the world. Famous Italian opera singers include Enrico Caruso and Alessandro Bonci.

Introduced in the early 1920s, jazz took a particularly strong foothold in Italy, and remained popular despite the xenophobic cultural policies of the Fascist regime. Today, the most notable centres of jazz music in Italy include Milan, Rome, and Sicily. Later, Italy was at the forefront of the progressive rock and pop movement of the 1970s, with bands such as PFM, Banco del Mutuo Soccorso, Le Orme, Goblin, and Pooh. The same period saw diversification in the cinema of Italy, and Cinecittà films included complex scores by composers including Ennio Morricone, Armando Trovaioli, Piero Piccioni, and Piero Umiliani. In the early 1980s, the first star to emerge from the Italian hip hop scene was singer Jovanotti. Italian metal bands include Rhapsody of Fire, Lacuna Coil, Elvenking, Forgotten Tomb, and Fleshgod Apocalypse.

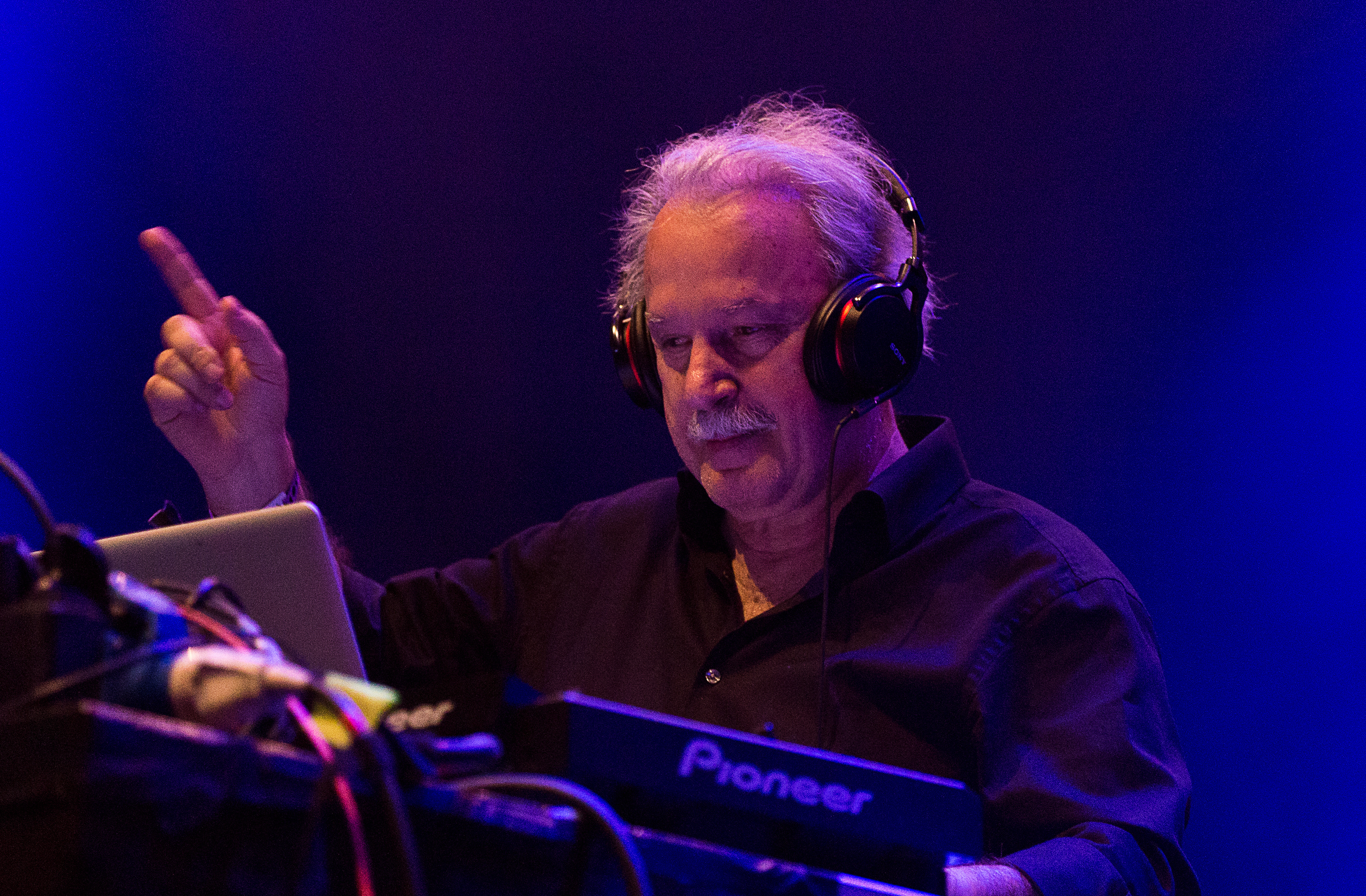
Giorgio Moroder, pioneer of Italo disco and electronic dance music, is known as the "Father of disco".

Italy contributed to the development of disco and electronic music, with Italo disco, known for its futuristic sound and prominent use of synthesisers and drum machines, being one of the earliest electronic dance genres, as well as European forms of disco aside from Euro disco (which later went on to influence several genres such as Eurodance and Nu-disco). By the latter half of the 1990s, a subgenre of Eurodance known as Italo dance emerged. Taking influences from Italo disco and Italo house, Italo dance generally included synthesiser riffs, a melodic sound, and the usage of vocoders. Notable Italian DJs and remixers include Gabry Ponte (member of the group Eiffel 65), Benny Benassi, Gigi D'Agostino, and the trio Tacabro.

Producers such as Giorgio Moroder, who won three Academy Awards and four Golden Globes for his music, were highly influential in the development of electronic dance music. Today, Italian pop music is represented annually with the Sanremo Music Festival, which served as inspiration for the Eurovision song contest, and the Festival of Two Worlds in Spoleto. Singers such as Mina, Andrea Bocelli, Grammy winner Laura Pausini, Zucchero, Eros Ramazzotti, Elisa, and Tiziano Ferro have attained international acclaim. Gigliola Cinquetti, Toto Cutugno, and Måneskin won the Eurovision Song Contest, in 1964, 1990, and 2021 respectively.

Italian folk music has a deep and complex history. National unification came quite late to the Italian peninsula, so its many hundreds of separate cultures remained un-homogenised until quite recently. Moreover, Italian folk music reflects Italy's geographic position at the south of Europe and in the centre of the Mediterranean Sea: Slavic, Arabic, Greek, Spanish, and Byzantine influences are readily apparent in the musical styles of the Italian regions. Today, Italy's folk music is often divided into several spheres of geographic influence, a classification system proposed by Alan Lomax in 1956 and often repeated since.

=== Philosophy ===
Over the ages, Italian philosophy and literature had a vast influence on Western philosophy, beginning with the Greeks and Romans, and going onto Renaissance humanism, the Age of Enlightenment and modern philosophy. Philosophy was brought to Italy by Pythagoras, founder of the Italian school of philosophy in Crotone, Magna Graecia. Major Italian philosophers of the Greek period include Xenophanes, Parmenides, Zeno, Empedocles, and Gorgias. Roman philosophers include Cicero, Lucretius, Seneca the Younger, Musonius Rufus, Plutarch, Epictetus, Marcus Aurelius, Clement of Alexandria, Sextus Empiricus, Alexander of Aphrodisias, Plotinus, Porphyry, Iamblichus, Augustine of Hippo, Philoponus of Alexandria, and Boethius.

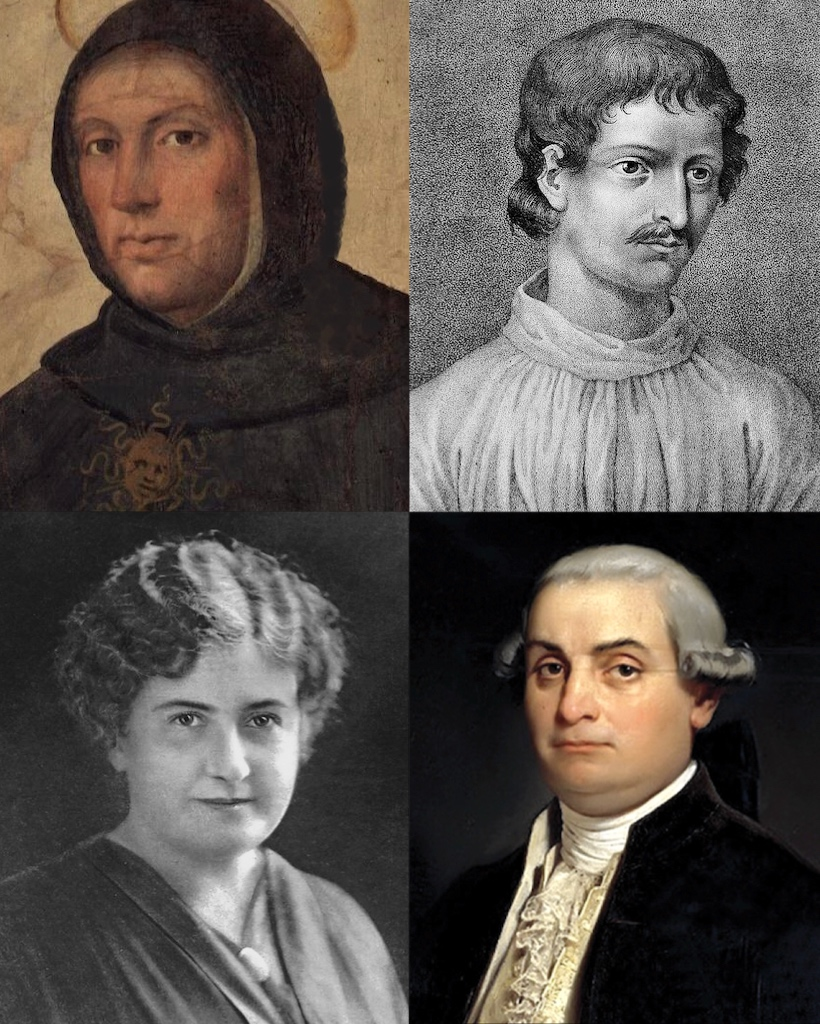
Clockwise from top left: Thomas Aquinas, proponent of natural theology and the Father of Thomism; Giordano Bruno, one of the major scientific figures of the Western world; Cesare Beccaria, considered the Father of criminal justice and modern criminal law; and Maria Montessori, credited with the creation of the Montessori education

Italian Medieval philosophy was mainly Christian, and included philosophers and theologians such as Thomas Aquinas, the foremost classical proponent of natural theology and the father of Thomism, who reintroduced Aristotelian philosophy to Christianity. Notable Renaissance philosophers include: Giordano Bruno, one of the major scientific figures of the western world; Marsilio Ficino, one of the most influential humanist philosophers of the period; and Niccolò Machiavelli, one of the main founders of modern political science. Machiavelli's most famous work was The Prince, whose contribution to the history of political thought is the fundamental break between political realism and political idealism. Italy was also affected by the Enlightenment, a movement which was a consequence of the Renaissance. University cities such as Padua, Bologna and Naples remained centres of scholarship and the intellect, with several philosophers such as Giambattista Vico (widely regarded as being the founder of modern Italian philosophy) and Antonio Genovesi. Cesare Beccaria was a significant Enlightenment figure and is now considered one of the fathers of classical criminal theory as well as modern penology. Beccaria is famous for his On Crimes and Punishments (1764), a treatise that served as one of the earliest prominent condemnations of torture and the death penalty and thus a landmark work in anti-death penalty philosophy.

Italy also had a renowned philosophical movement in the 1800s, with Idealism, Sensism, and Empiricism. The main Sensist Italian philosophers were Melchiorre Gioja and Gian Domenico Romagnosi. Criticism of the Sensist movement came from other philosophers such as Pasquale Galluppi (1770–1846), who affirmed that a priori relationships were synthetic. Antonio Rosmini, instead, was the founder of Italian idealism. During the late 19th and 20th centuries, there were also several other movements which gained some form of popularity in Italy, such as Ontologism (whose main philosopher was Vincenzo Gioberti), Christian democracy, communism, socialism, futurism, fascism, and anarchism. Giovanni Gentile and Benedetto Croce were two of the most significant 20th-century Idealist philosophers. Anarcho-communism first fully formed into its modern strain within the Italian section of the First International. Antonio Gramsci remains a relevant philosopher within Marxist and communist theory, credited with creating the theory of cultural hegemony. Italian philosophers were also influential in the development of the non-Marxist liberal socialism philosophy, including Carlo Rosselli, Norberto Bobbio, Piero Gobetti, and Aldo Capitini. In the 1960s, many Italian left-wing activists adopted the anti-authoritarian pro-working class leftist theories that would become known as autonomism and operaismo.

Early Italian feminists include Sibilla Aleramo, Alaide Gualberta Beccari, and Anna Maria Mozzoni, although proto-feminist philosophies had previously been touched upon by earlier Italian writers such as Christine de Pizan, Moderata Fonte, and Lucrezia Marinella. Italian physician and educator Maria Montessori is credited with the creation of the philosophy of education that bears her name, an educational philosophy now practised throughout the world. Giuseppe Peano was one of the founders of analytic philosophy and contemporary philosophy of mathematics. Recent analytic philosophers include Carlo Penco, Gloria Origgi, Pieranna Garavaso, and Luciano Floridi.

=== Sculpture ===
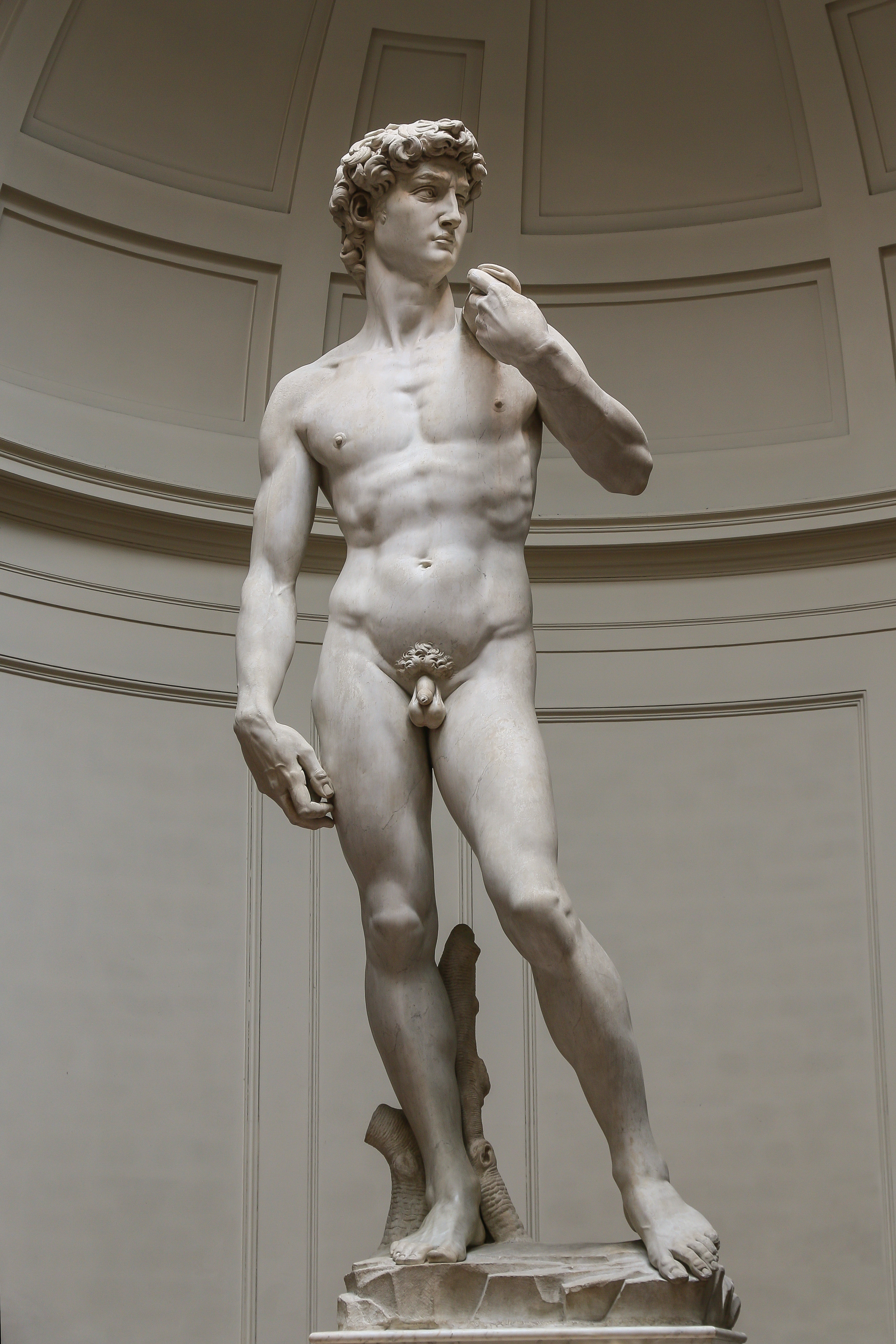
David, by Michelangelo (Accademia di Belle Arti, Florence, Italy), is a masterpiece of Renaissance and world art.

The art of sculpture in the Italian Peninsula has its roots in ancient times. In the archaic period, when Etruscan cities dominated central Italy and the adjacent sea, Etruscan sculpture flourished. The name of an individual artist, Vulca, who worked at Veii, has been identified. He has left a terracotta Apollo and other figures, and can perhaps claim the distinction of being the most ancient master in the long history of Italian art.

A significant development of this art occurred between the 6th century BC and 5th century AD during the growth of the Roman Empire. The earliest Roman sculpture was influenced by the Etruscans to the north of Rome and by Greek colonists to the south. During the Empire period, the pure realism of the Republican period portrait busts was joined to Greek idealism. The result, evident in Augustus of Primaporta, was often a curious juxtaposition of individualised heads with idealised, anatomically perfect bodies in Classical poses.

During the Middle Ages, large sculpture was largely religious. Carolingian artists (named after Charlemagne's family) in northern Italy created sculpture for covers of Bibles, as decoration for parts of church altars, and for crucifixes and giant candlesticks placed on altars.

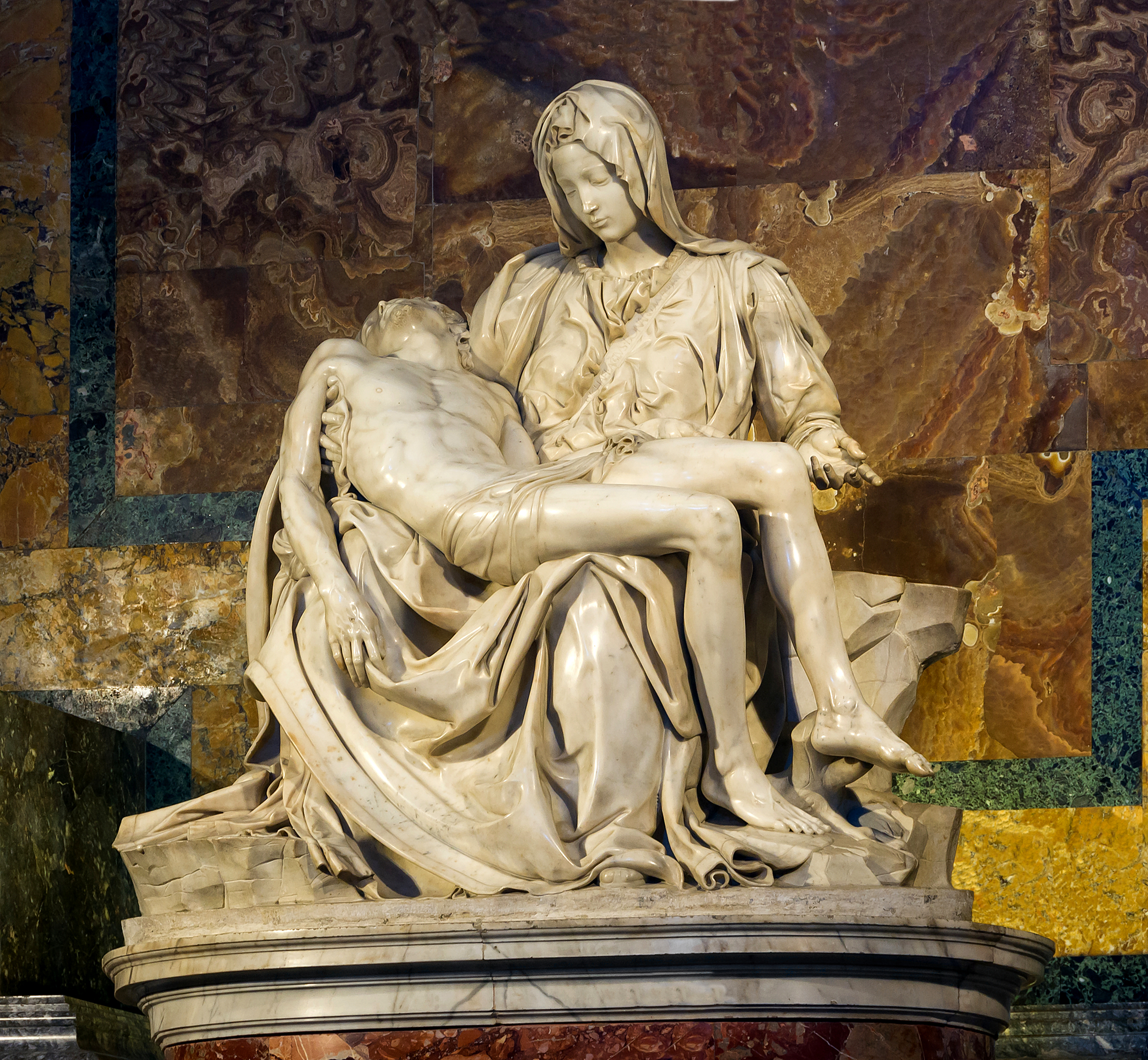
Pietà, by Michelangelo, is a key work of Italian Renaissance sculpture.

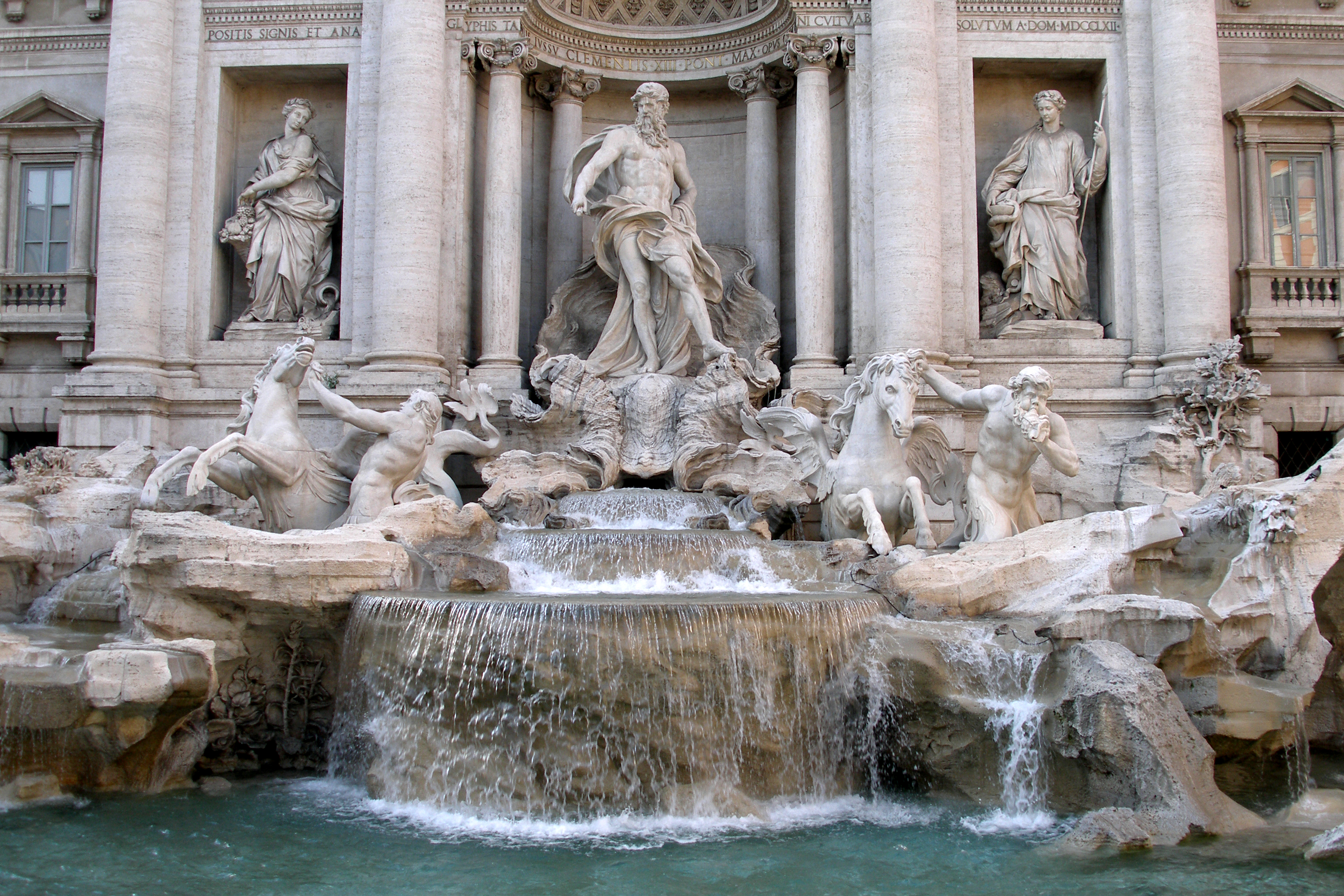
The Trevi Fountain in Rome

In the late 13th century, Nicola Pisano and his son Giovanni began the revolutionary changes that led up to the Renaissance in Italian sculpture, drawing influences from Roman sarcophagi and other remains. Both are noted for their reliefs and ornamentation on pulpits. The Massacre of the Innocents by Giovanni Pisano is an example.

The greatest sculptor of the early Renaissance was Donatello. In 1430, he produced a bronze statue of David, which re-established the classical idea of beauty in the naked human body. Conceived fully in the round and independent of any architectural surroundings, it was the first major work of Renaissance sculpture. Among the other brilliant sculptors of the 15th century were Jacopo della Quercia, Michelozzo, Bernardo and Antonio Rossellino, Giambologna, and Agostino di Duccio.

Michelangelo's great brooding sculptures, such as the figures of Night and Day in the Medici Chapel in Florence, dominated High Renaissance Italian sculpture. His David, is perhaps, the most famous sculpture in the world. It differs from previous representations of the subject in that David is depicted before his battle with Goliath and not after the giant's defeat. Instead of being shown victorious over a foe much larger than he, David looks tense and ready for combat.

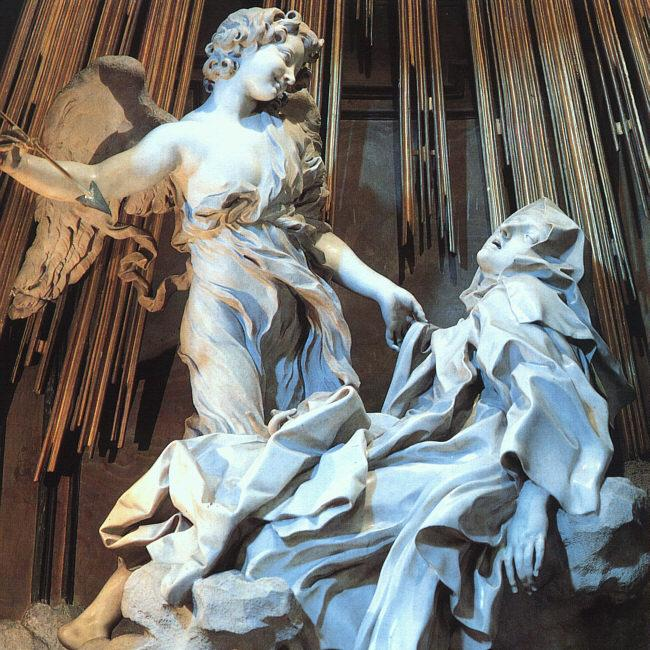
The Ecstasy of Saint Teresa by Gian Lorenzo Bernini

Gian Lorenzo Bernini was the most important sculptor of the Baroque period. He combined emotional and sensual freedom with theatrical presentation and an almost photographic naturalism. Bernini's saints and other figures seem to sit, stand, and move as living people—and the viewer becomes part of the scene. This involvement of the spectator is a basic characteristic of Baroque sculpture. One of his most famous works is Ecstasy of Saint Teresa.

The Neoclassical movement arose in the late 18th century. The members of this very international school restored what they regarded as classical principles of art. They were direct imitators of ancient Greek sculptors, and emphasised classical drapery and the nude. The leading Neoclassical artist in Italy was Antonio Canova, who like many other foreign neoclassical sculptors including Bertel Thorvaldsen was based in Rome. His ability to carve pure white Italian marble has seldom been equalled. Most of his statues are in European collections, but the Metropolitan Museum of Art in New York City owns important works, including Perseus and Cupid and Psyche.

In the 20th century, many Italians played leading roles in the development of modern art. Futurist sculptors tried to show how space, movement, and time affected form. These artists portrayed objects in motion, rather than their appearance at any particular moment. An example is Umberto Boccioni's Unique Forms of Continuity in Space.

=== Theatre ===
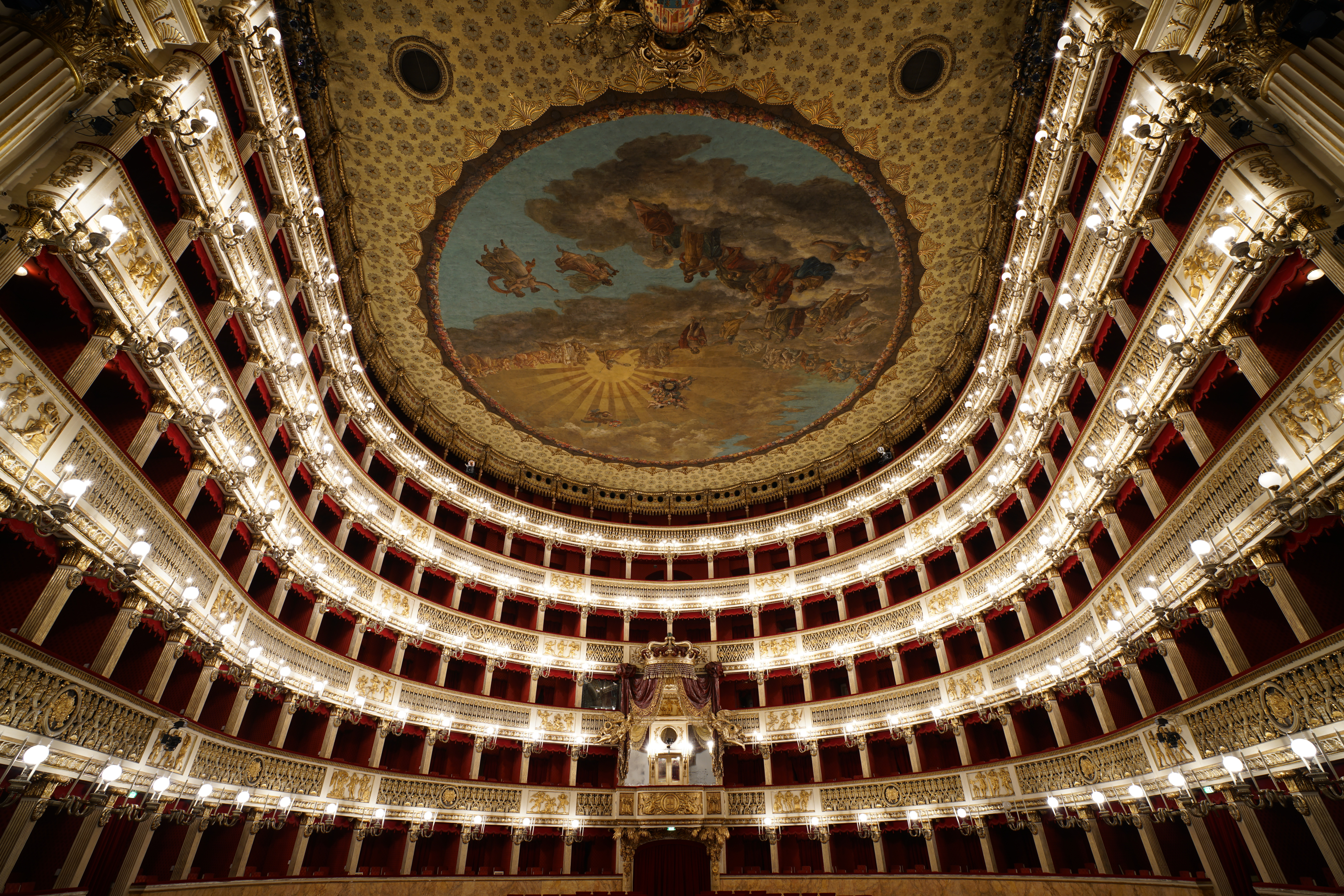
Teatro di San Carlo, Naples. It is the oldest continuously active venue for opera in the world.

Italian theatre originates from the Middle Ages, with its background dating back to the times of the ancient Greek colonies of Magna Graecia, in southern Italy, the theatre of the Italic peoples and the theatre of ancient Rome. It can therefore be assumed that there were two main lines of which the ancient Italian theatre developed in the Middle Ages. The first, consisting of the dramatization of Catholic liturgies and of which more documentation is retained, and the second, formed by pagan forms of spectacle such as the staging for city festivals, the court preparations of the jesters and the songs of the troubadours. The Renaissance theatre marked the beginning of the modern theatre due to the rediscovery and study of the classics, the ancient theatrical texts were recovered and translated, which were soon staged at the court and in the curtensi halls, and then moved to real theatre. In this way, the idea of theatre came close to that of today: a performance in a designated place in which the public participates. In the late 15th century two cities were important centres for the rediscovery and renewal of theatrical art: Ferrara and Rome. The first, vital centre of art in the second half of the 15th century, saw the staging of some of the most famous Latin works by Plautus, rigorously translated into Italian.

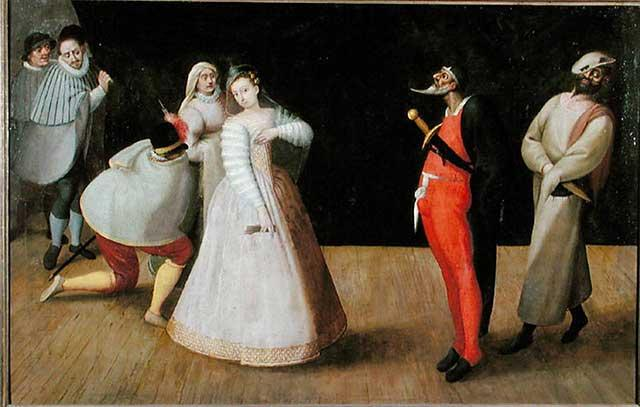
Commedia dell'arte troupe I Gelosi performing, by Hieronymus Francken I, c. 1590

During the 16th century and on into the 18th century, commedia dell'arte was a form of improvisational theatre, and it is still performed today. Travelling troupes of players would set up an outdoor stage and provide amusement in the form of juggling, acrobatics and, more typically, humorous plays based on a repertoire of established characters with a rough storyline, called canovaccio. Plays did not originate from written drama but from scenarios called lazzi, which were loose frameworks that provided the situations, complications, and outcome of the action, around which the actors would improvise. The characters of the commedia usually represent fixed social types and stock characters, each of which has a distinct costume, such as foolish old men, devious servants, or military officers full of false bravado. The main categories of these characters include servants, old men, lovers, and captains.

The first recorded commedia dell'arte performances came from Rome as early as 1551, and were performed outdoors in temporary venues by professional actors who were costumed and masked, as opposed to commedia erudita, which were written comedies, presented indoors by untrained and unmasked actors. By the mid-16th century, specific troupes of commedia performers began to coalesce, and by 1568 the Gelosi became a distinct company. Commedia often performed inside in court theatres or halls, and also in some fixed theatres such as Teatro Baldrucca in Florence. Flaminio Scala, who had been a minor performer in the Gelosi published the scenarios of the commedia dell'arte around the start of the 17th century, really in an effort to legitimise the form—and ensure its legacy. These scenarios are highly structured and built around the symmetry of the various types in duet: two Zanni, vecchi, innamorate and innamorati, among others.

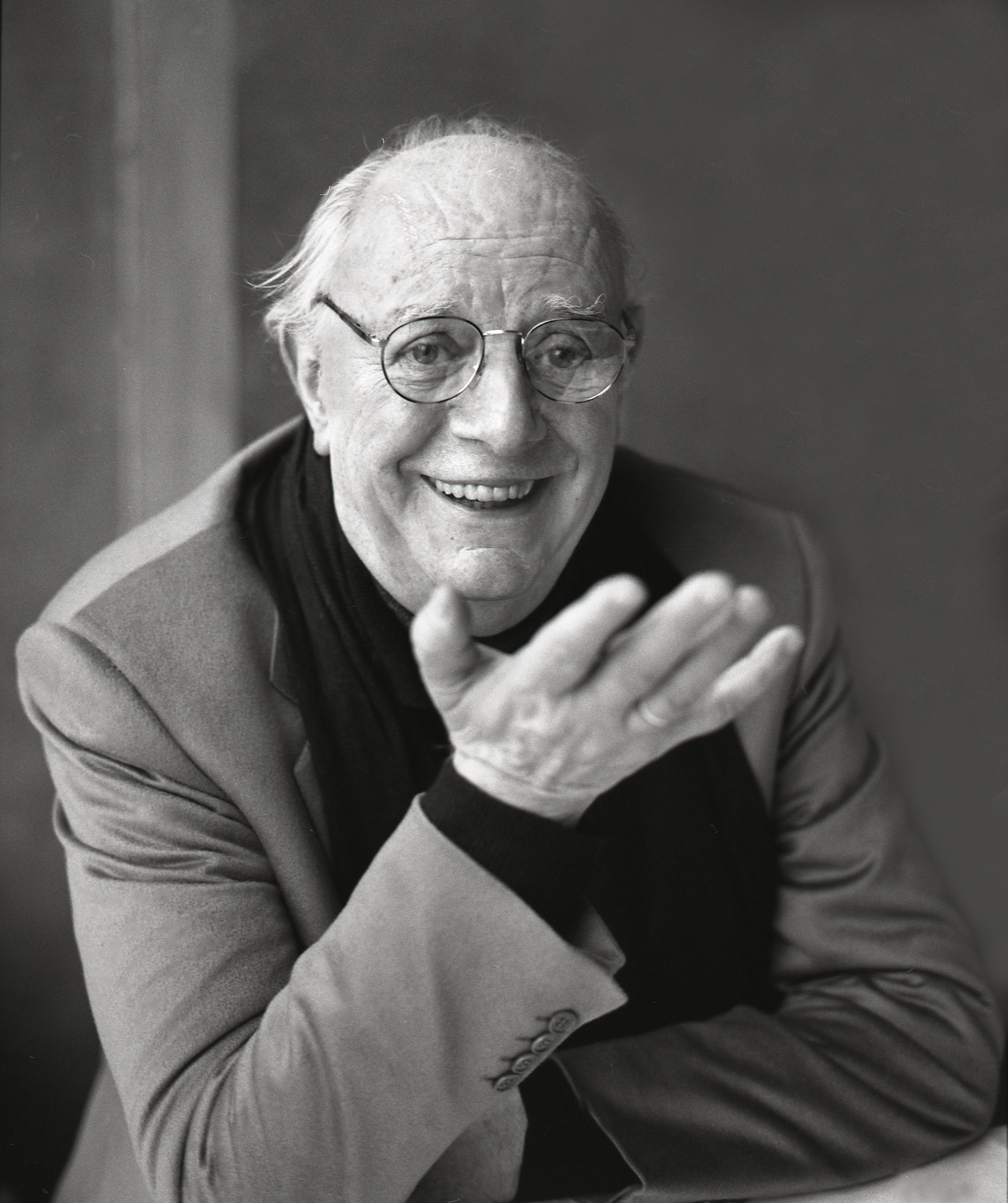
Dario Fo, one of the most widely performed playwrights in modern theatre, received international acclaim for his highly improvisational style. He was awarded the Nobel Prize for Literature in 1997.

In the commedia dell'arte, female roles were played by women, documented as early as the 1560s, making them the first known professional actresses in Europe since antiquity. Lucrezia Di Siena, whose name is on a contract of actors from 10 October 1564, has been referred to as the first Italian actress known by name, with Vincenza Armani and Barbara Flaminia as the first primadonnas and the first well-documented actresses in Europe.

The Ballet dance genre also originated in Italy. It began during the Italian Renaissance court as an outgrowth of court pageantry, where aristocratic weddings were lavish celebrations. Court musicians and dancers collaborated to provide elaborate entertainment for them. Domenico da Piacenza was one of the first dancing masters. Along with his students, Antonio Cornazzano and Guglielmo Ebreo, he was trained in dance and responsible for teaching nobles the art. Da Piacenza left one work: De arte saltandi et choreus ducendi ('On the art of dancing and conducting dances'), which was put together by his students.

At first, ballets were woven into the midst of an opera to allow the audience a moment of relief from the dramatic intensity. By the mid-17th century, Italian ballets in their entirety were performed in between the acts of an opera. Over time, Italian ballets became part of theatrical life: ballet companies in Italy's major opera houses employed an average of four to twelve dancers; in 1815 many companies employed anywhere from eighty to one hundred dancers.

Carlo Goldoni, who wrote a few scenarios starting in 1734, superseded the comedy of masks and the comedy of intrigue by representations of actual life and manners through the characters and their behaviours. He rightly maintained that Italian life and manners were susceptible to artistic treatment such as had not been given them before. Italian theatre has been active in producing contemporary European work and in staging revivals, including the works of Luigi Pirandello and Dario Fo.

The Teatro di San Carlo in Naples is the oldest continuously active venue for public opera in the world, opening in 1737, decades before both Milan's La Scala and Venice's La Fenice theatres.

=== Visual art ===
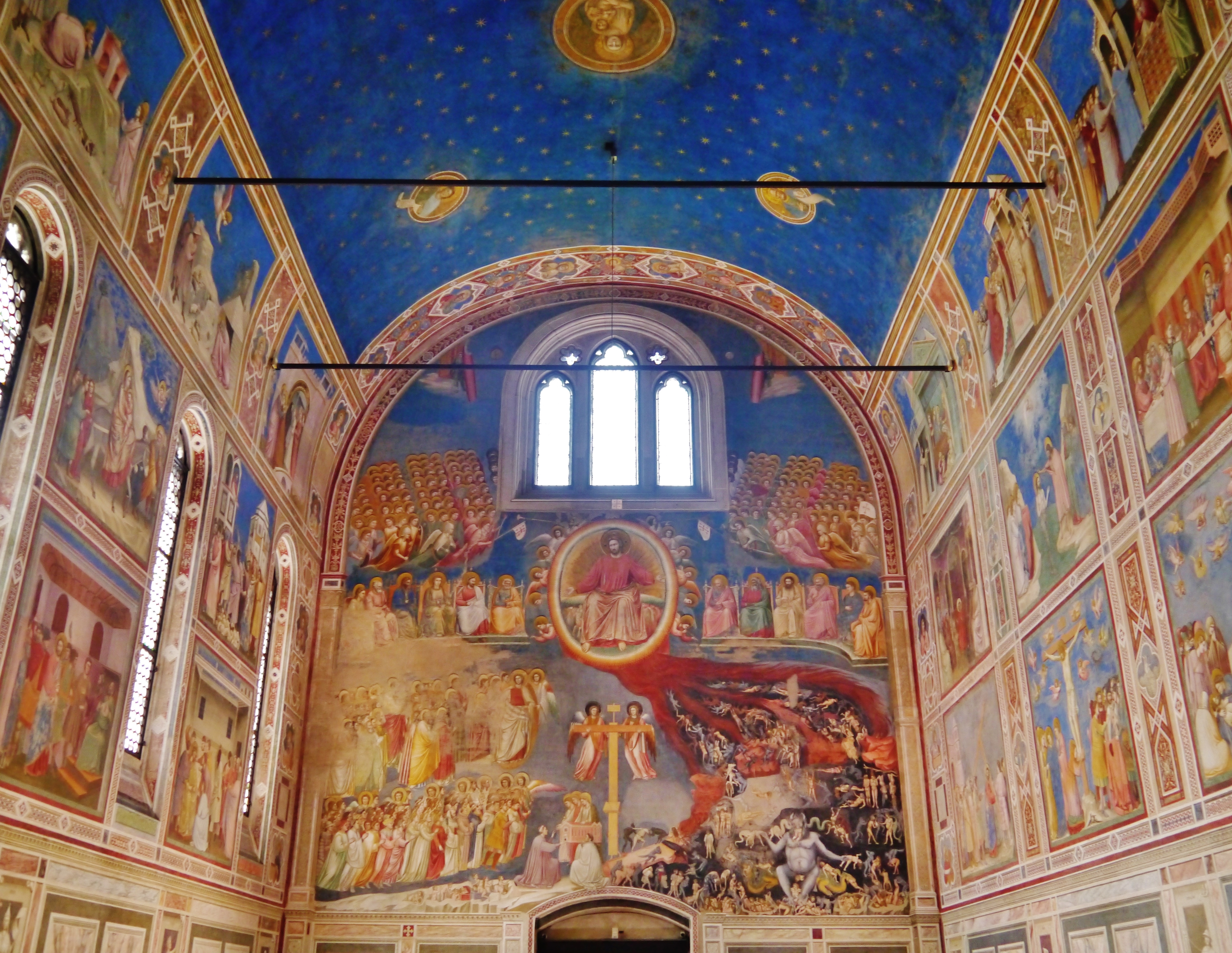
Scrovegni Chapel. The chapel contains a fresco cycle by Giotto, completed about 1305 and considered to be an important masterpiece of Western art.

The history of Italian visual arts is significant to the history of Western painting. Since ancient times, Greeks and Etruscans have inhabited the south, centre and north of the Italian peninsula respectively. The very numerous rock drawings in Valcamonica are as old as 8,000 BC, and there are rich remains of Etruscan art.

Roman art was influenced by Greece and can in part be taken as a descendant of ancient Greek painting. Roman painting does have its own unique characteristics. The only surviving Roman paintings are wall paintings, many from villas in Campania, in southern Italy. Such paintings can be grouped into four main "styles" or periods and may contain the first examples of trompe-l'œil, pseudo-perspective, and pure landscape.

Panel painting becomes more common during the Romanesque period, under the heavy influence of Byzantine icons. Towards the middle of the 13th century, Medieval art and Gothic painting became more realistic, with the beginnings of interest in the depiction of volume and perspective in Italy with Cimabue and then his pupil Giotto. From Giotto onwards, the treatment of composition in painting became much more free and innovative.

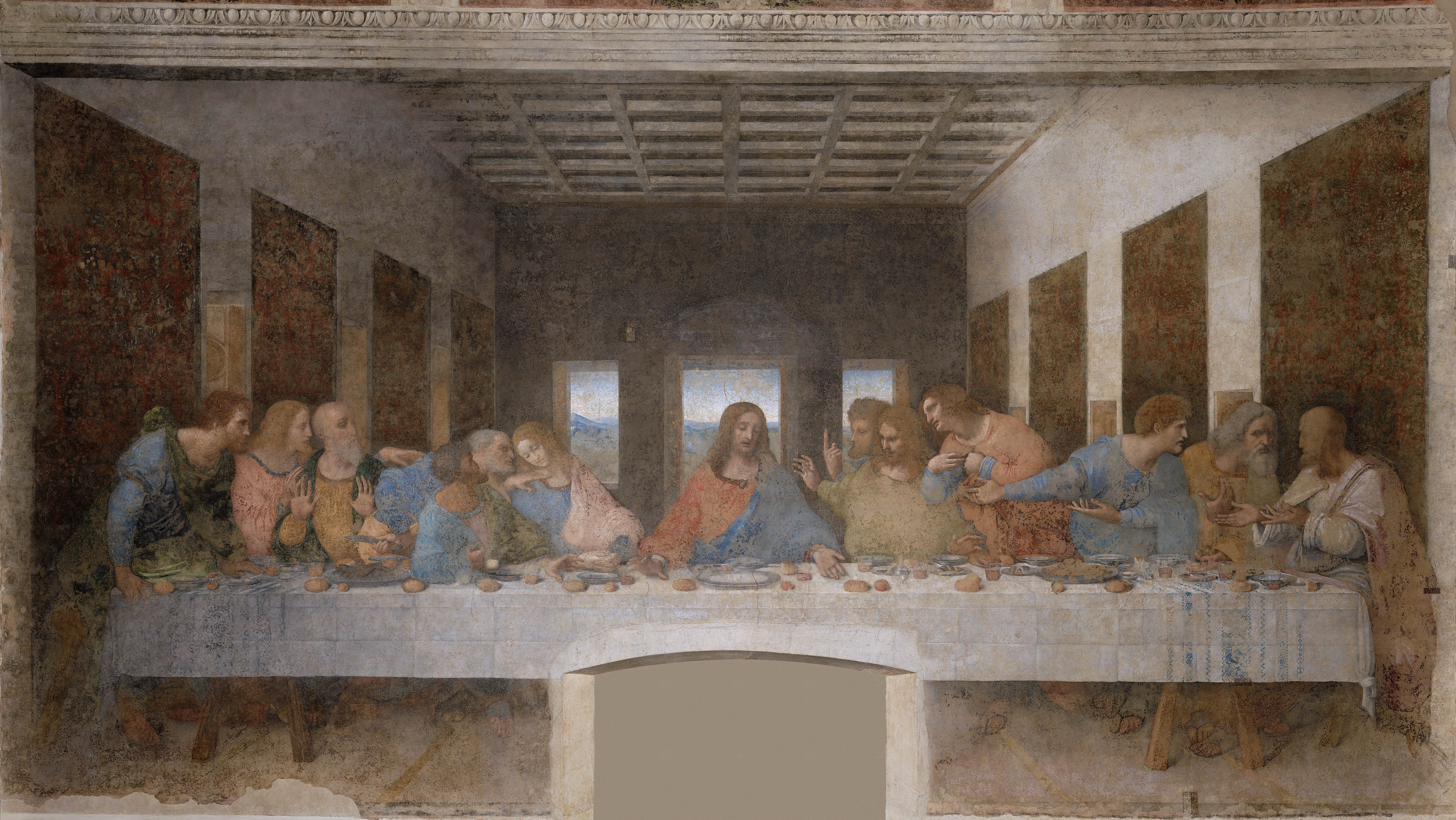
The Last Supper by Leonardo da Vinci, possibly one of the most famous and iconic examples of Italian art

The Italian Renaissance is said by many to be the golden age of painting; roughly spanning the 14th through the mid-17th centuries with a significant influence also out of the borders of modern Italy. In Italy artists such as Paolo Uccello, Fra Angelico, Masaccio, Piero della Francesca, Andrea Mantegna, Filippo Lippi, Giorgione, Tintoretto, Sandro Botticelli, Leonardo da Vinci, Michelangelo Buonarroti, Raphael, Giovanni Bellini, and Titian took painting to a higher level through the use of perspective, the study of human anatomy and proportion, and through their development of refined drawing and painting techniques.

In the 15th and 16th centuries, the High Renaissance gave rise to a stylised art known as Mannerism. In place of the balanced compositions and rational approach to perspective that characterised art at the dawn of the 16th century, the Mannerists sought instability, artifice, and doubt. The unperturbed faces and gestures of Piero della Francesca and the calm Virgins of Raphael are replaced by the troubled expressions of Pontormo and the emotional intensity of El Greco.

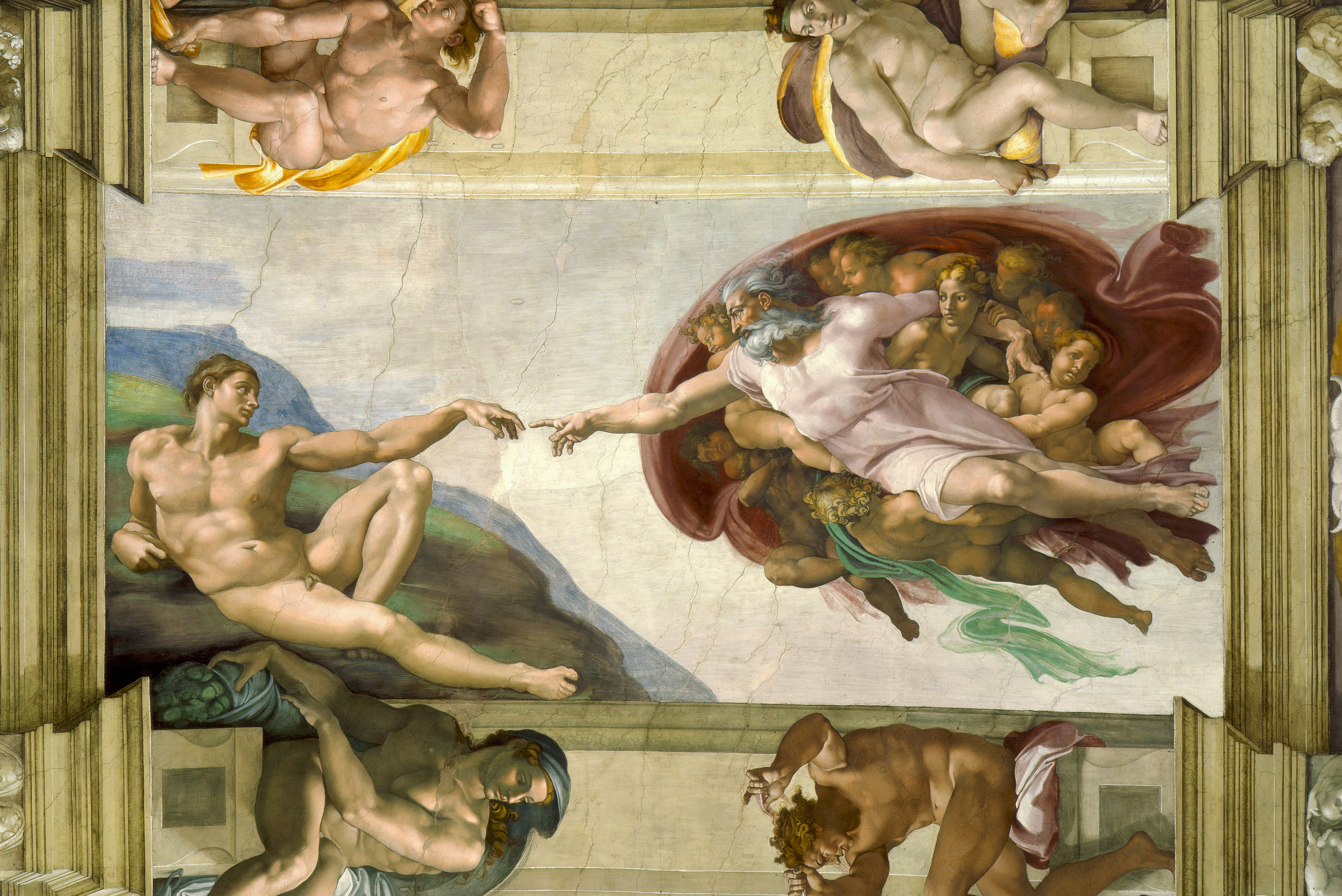
The Creation of Adam is one of the scenes on the ceiling of the Sistine Chapel of the Vatican, painted by Michelangelo sometime between 1508 and 1512.

In the 17th century, among the greatest painters of Italian Baroque are Caravaggio, Annibale Carracci, Artemisia Gentileschi, Mattia Preti, Carlo Saraceni, and Bartolomeo Manfredi. Subsequently, in the 18th century, Italian Rococo was mainly inspired by French Rococo, since France was the founding nation of that particular style, with artists such as Giovanni Battista Tiepolo and Canaletto.

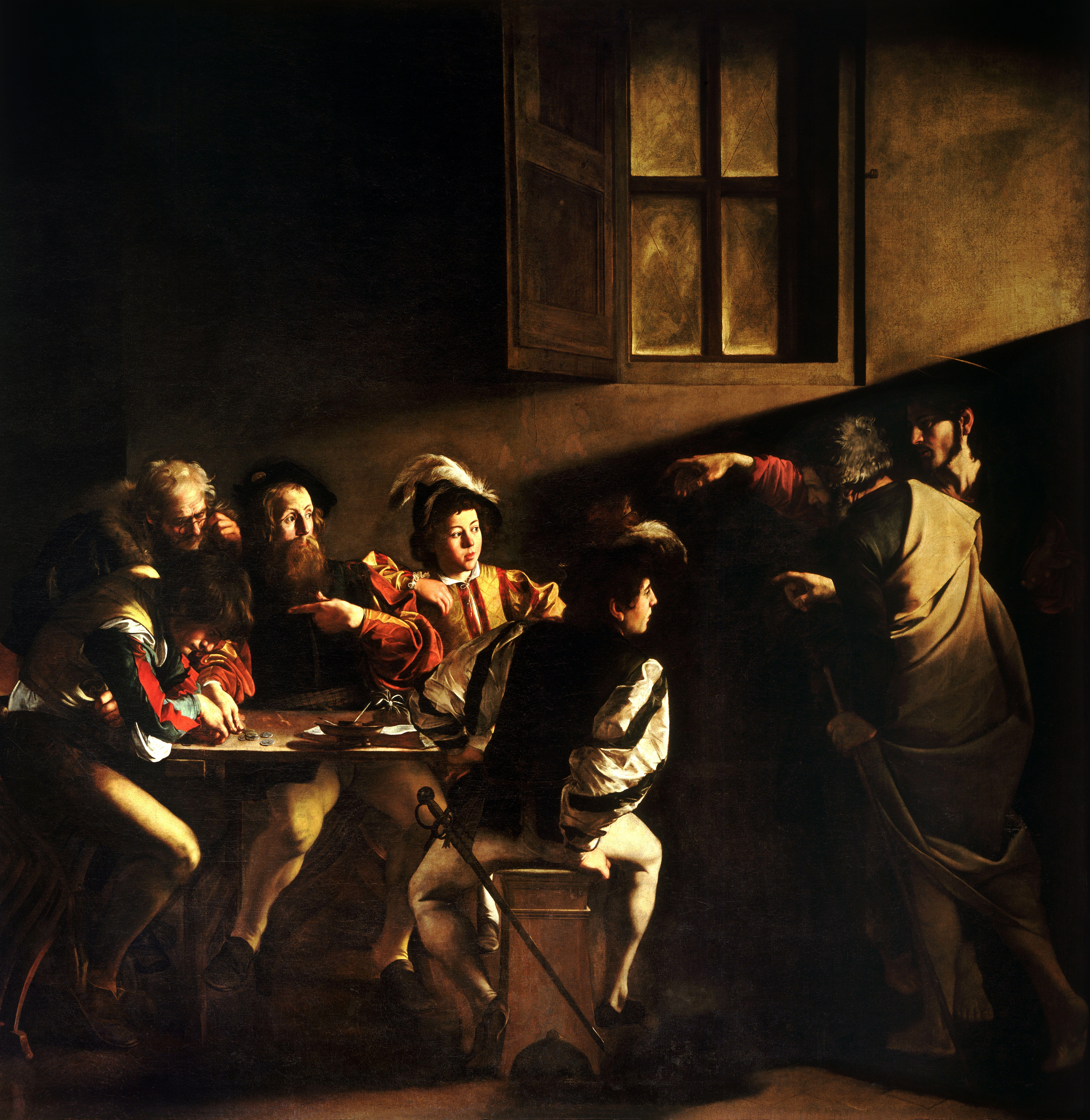
The Calling of St Matthew by Caravaggio

In the 19th century, major Italian Romantic painters were Francesco Hayez, Giuseppe Bezzuoli, and Francesco Podesti. Impressionism was brought from France to Italy by the Macchiaioli, led by Giovanni Fattori and Giovanni Boldini; and Realism by Gioacchino Toma and Giuseppe Pellizza da Volpedo. In the 20th century, with Futurism, primarily through the works of Umberto Boccioni and Giacomo Balla, Italy rose again as a seminal country for artistic evolution in painting. Futurism was succeeded by the metaphysical paintings of Giorgio de Chirico, who exerted a strong influence on the Surrealists and generations of artists to follow such as Bruno Caruso and Renato Guttuso.

Metaphysical painting is an Italian art movement, born in 1917 with the work of Carlo Carrà and Giorgio de Chirico in Ferrara. The word metaphysical, adopted by De Chirico himself, is core to the poetics of the movement; Novecento movement, a group of Italian artists, formed in 1922 in Milan, that advocated a return to the great Italian representational art of the past. The founding members of the Novecento ('20th century') movement were the critic Margherita Sarfatti and seven artists: Anselmo Bucci, Leonardo Dudreville, Achille Funi, Gian Emilio Malerba, Piero Marussig, Ubaldo Oppi, and Mario Sironi.

Spatialism was founded by the Italian artist Lucio Fontana as the movimento spaziale, its tenets were repeated in manifestos between 1947 and 1954. Combining elements of concrete art, dada and tachism, the movement's adherents rejected easel painting and embraced new technological developments, seeking to incorporate time and movement in their works. Fontana's slashed and pierced paintings exemplify his thesis. Arte Povera is an artistic movement that originated in Italy in the 1960s, combining aspects of conceptual, minimalist, and performance art, and making use of worthless or common materials such as earth or newspaper, in the hope of subverting the commercialization of art.

Transavantgarde is the Italian version of Neo-expressionism, an art movement that swept through Italy and the rest of Western Europe in the late 1970s and 1980s. The term transavanguardia was coined by the Italian art critic, Achille Bonito Oliva, originating in the "Aperto '80" at the Venice Biennale, and literally means 'beyond the avant-garde'.

== Cuisine and meal structure ==
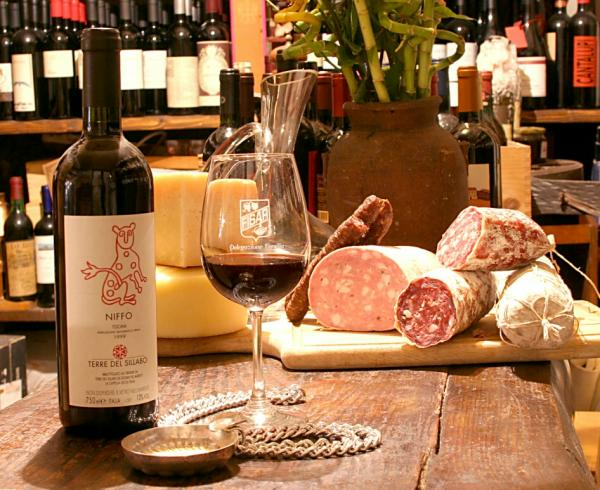
Italian wine and salumi

Italian cuisine is a Mediterranean cuisine consisting of the ingredients, recipes, and cooking techniques developed in Italy since Roman times, and later spread around the world together with waves of Italian diaspora. Italian cuisine includes deeply rooted traditions common to the whole country, as well as all the regional gastronomies, different from each other, especially between the north, the centre, and the south of Italy, which are in continuous exchange. Many dishes that were once regional have proliferated with variations throughout the country. The cuisine has influenced several other cuisines around the world, chiefly that of the United States in the form of Italian-American cuisine.

One of the main characteristics of Italian cuisine is its simplicity, with many dishes made up of few ingredients, and therefore Italian cooks rely on the quality of the ingredients, rather than the complexity of preparation. The most popular dishes and recipes, over the centuries, have often been created by ordinary people more so than by chefs, which is why many Italian recipes are suitable for home and daily cooking, respecting regional specificities, privileging only raw materials and ingredients from the region of origin of the dish and preserving its seasonality.

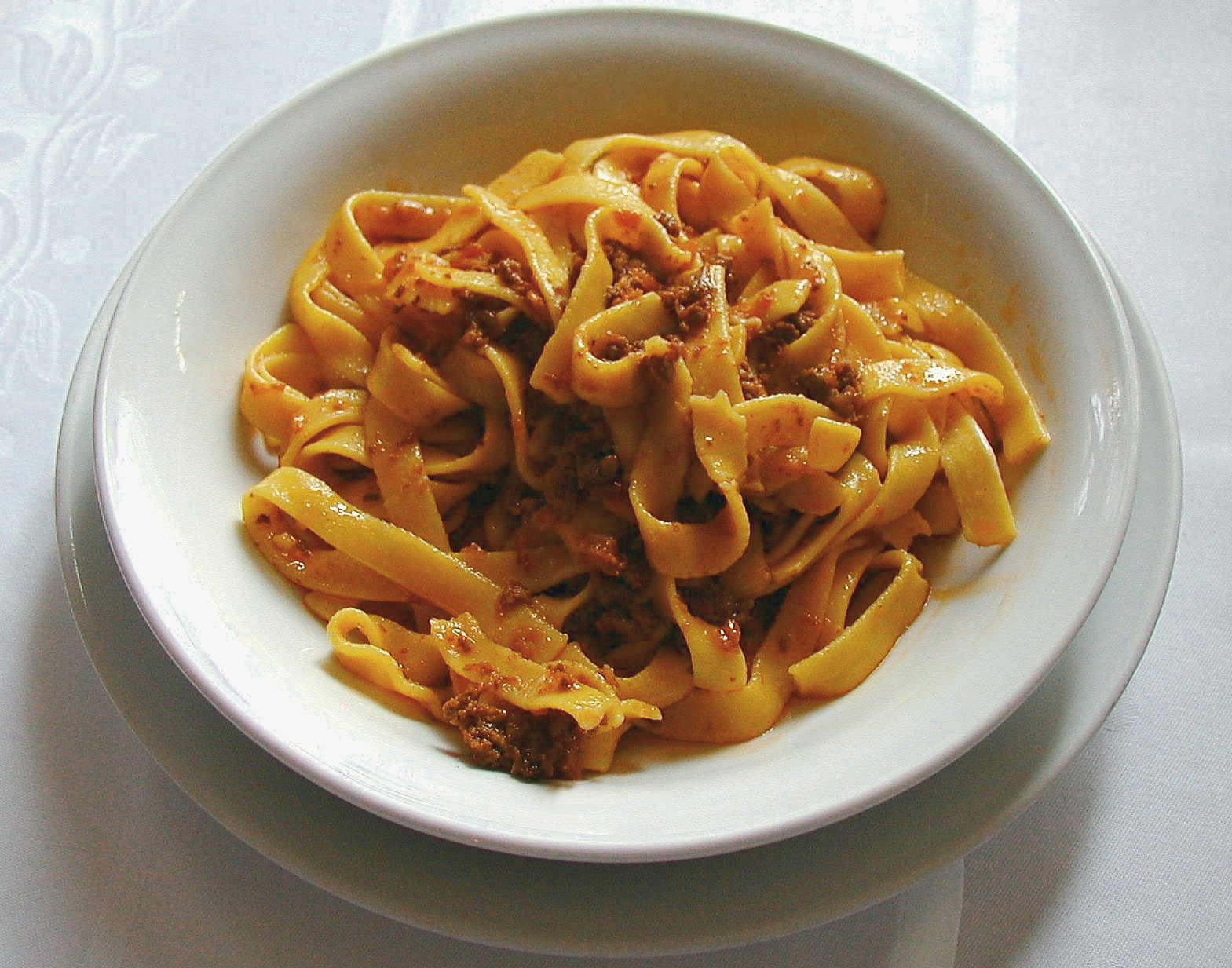
Tagliatelle with ragù

Italian cuisine has developed through centuries of social and political changes, it has its roots in ancient Rome. Artichokes, peas, lettuce, parsley, melons, and apples, as well as wine and cheese, many types of meat, and grains were all enjoyed by ancient Romans. For feasts Roman cooks used many spices, developed recipes for cheesecake and omelets, and roasted all types of meat. From this noble beginning a sophisticated and flavorful cuisine has emerged. Significant changes occurred with the discovery of the New World and the introduction of potatoes, tomatoes, bell peppers, and maize, now central to the cuisine but not introduced in quantity until the 18th century.

Italian cuisine, like other facets of the culture, speaks with highly inflected regional accents. There are certain self-consciously national constants: spaghetti with tomato sauce and pizza are highly common, but this nationalisation of culinary identity didn't start to take hold until after the Second World War, when southern immigrants flooded to the north in search of work, and even those classics vary from place to place; small enclaves still hold fast to their unique local forms of pasta and particular preparations. Classics such as pasta e fagioli, while found everywhere, are prepared differently according to local traditions. Gastronomic explorations of Italy are best undertaken by knowing the local traditions and eating the local foods.

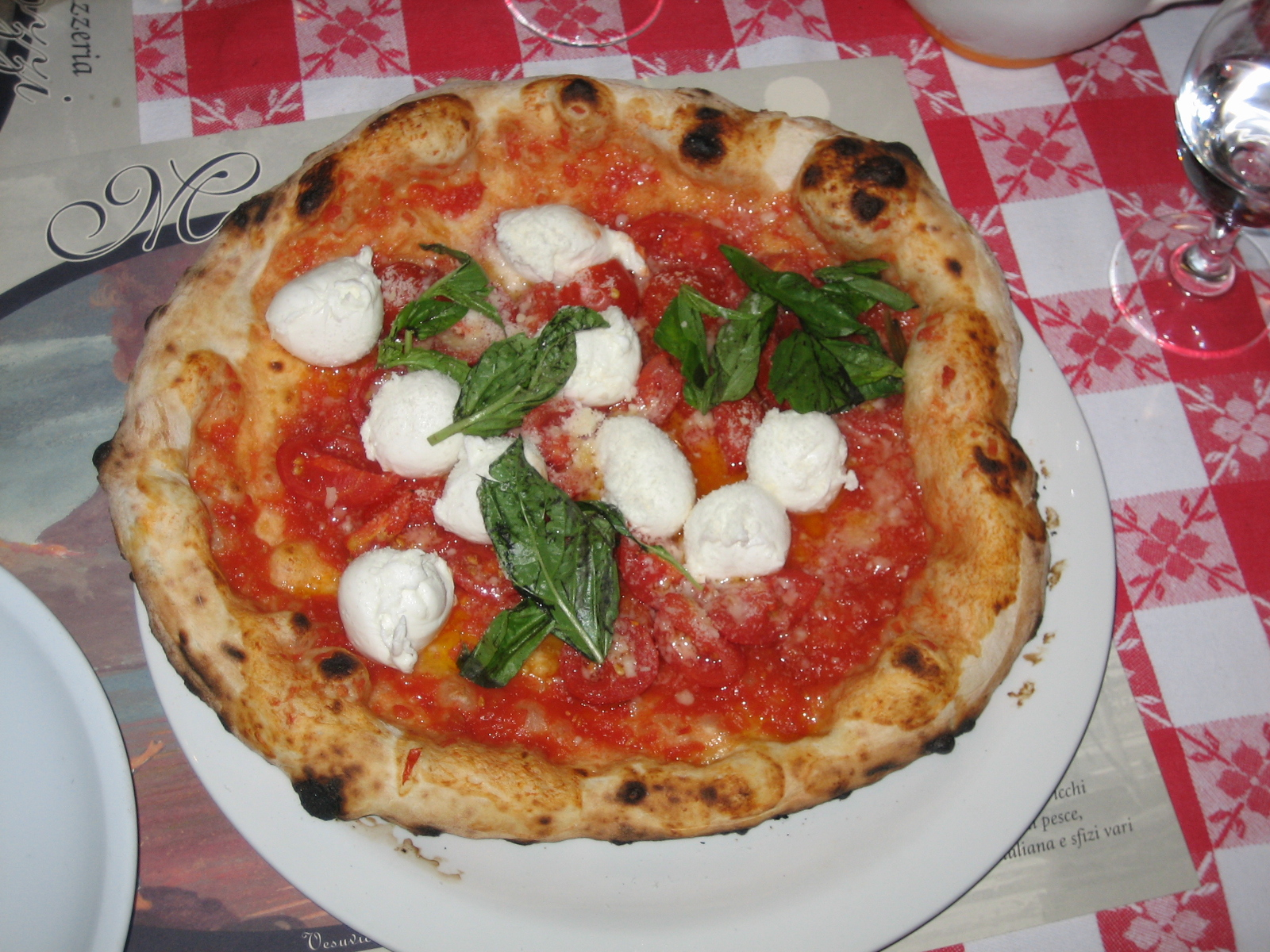
The ingredients of traditional pizza Margherita—tomatoes (red), mozzarella (white), and basil (green)—are held by popular legend to be inspired by the colours of the national flag of Italy.

Northern Italy, mountainous in many parts, is notable for the alpine cheeses of the Valle d'Aosta, the pesto of Liguria and, in Piedmont, the Alba truffle. In the Alto Adige, the influence of neighbouring Austria may be found in a regional repertoire that includes speck and dumplings. In the north, risotto and polenta have tended to serve the staple function taken by pasta across the rest of the country. Italy's centre includes the celebrated culinary regions of Tuscany, famous for its olive oil and bean dishes, and Emilia-Romagna, home of foods such as prosciutto di Parma, Parmigiano Reggiano, and ragù alla bolognese. Southern Italy includes the hearty food of Lazio in which meat and offal frequently figure, but also the vegetable-focused fare of Basilicata, historically one of Italy's poorest regions. The islands of Sicily and Sardinia have distinctively different foodways. The former is notable for its many sweet dishes, seafood, and citrus fruit, while Sardinia has traditionally looked to its hilly and mountainous interior with a cuisine centred on lamb, suckling pig, bread, and cheese.

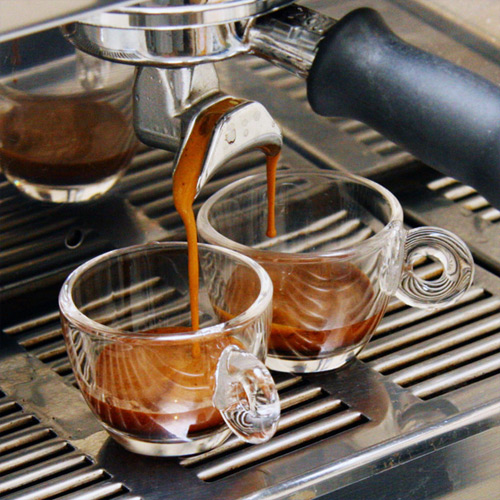
Espresso is a coffee brewed by forcing a small amount of nearly boiling water under pressure through finely ground coffee beans. The term espresso comes from the Italian esprimere, which means 'to express', and refers to the process by which hot water is forced under pressure through ground coffee.

It is in the food of Naples and Campania, however, that many visitors would recognise the foods that have come to be regarded as quintessentially Italian: pizza, spaghetti with tomato sauce, parmigiana, and so on.

Also, Italy exports and produces the highest level of wine, exporting over 2.38 million tonnes in 2011. As of 2005, Italy was responsible for producing approximately one-fifth of the world's wine. Some Italian regions are home to some of the oldest wine-producing traditions in the world. Etruscans and Greek settlers produced wine in the country long before the Romans started developing their own vineyards in the 2nd century BC. Roman grape-growing and winemaking were prolific and well-organised, pioneering large-scale production and storage techniques such as barrel -making and -bottling. Famous and traditional Italian wines include Barbaresco, Barbera, Barolo, Brunello di Montalcino, Chianti, Corvina, Dolcetto, and Nero d'Avola, to name a few.

The country is also famous for its gelato, or traditional ice-cream often known as Italian ice cream abroad. There are gelaterie or ice-cream vendors and shops all around Italian cities, and it is a very popular dessert or snack, especially during the summer. Sicilian granitas, or a frozen dessert of flavoured crushed ice, more or less similar to a sorbet or a snow cone, are popular desserts not only in Sicily or their native towns of Messina and Catania, but all over Italy (although the northern and central Italian equivalent, grattachecca, commonly found in Rome or Milan, is slightly different from the traditional granita siciliana). Italy also boasts an assortment of desserts.

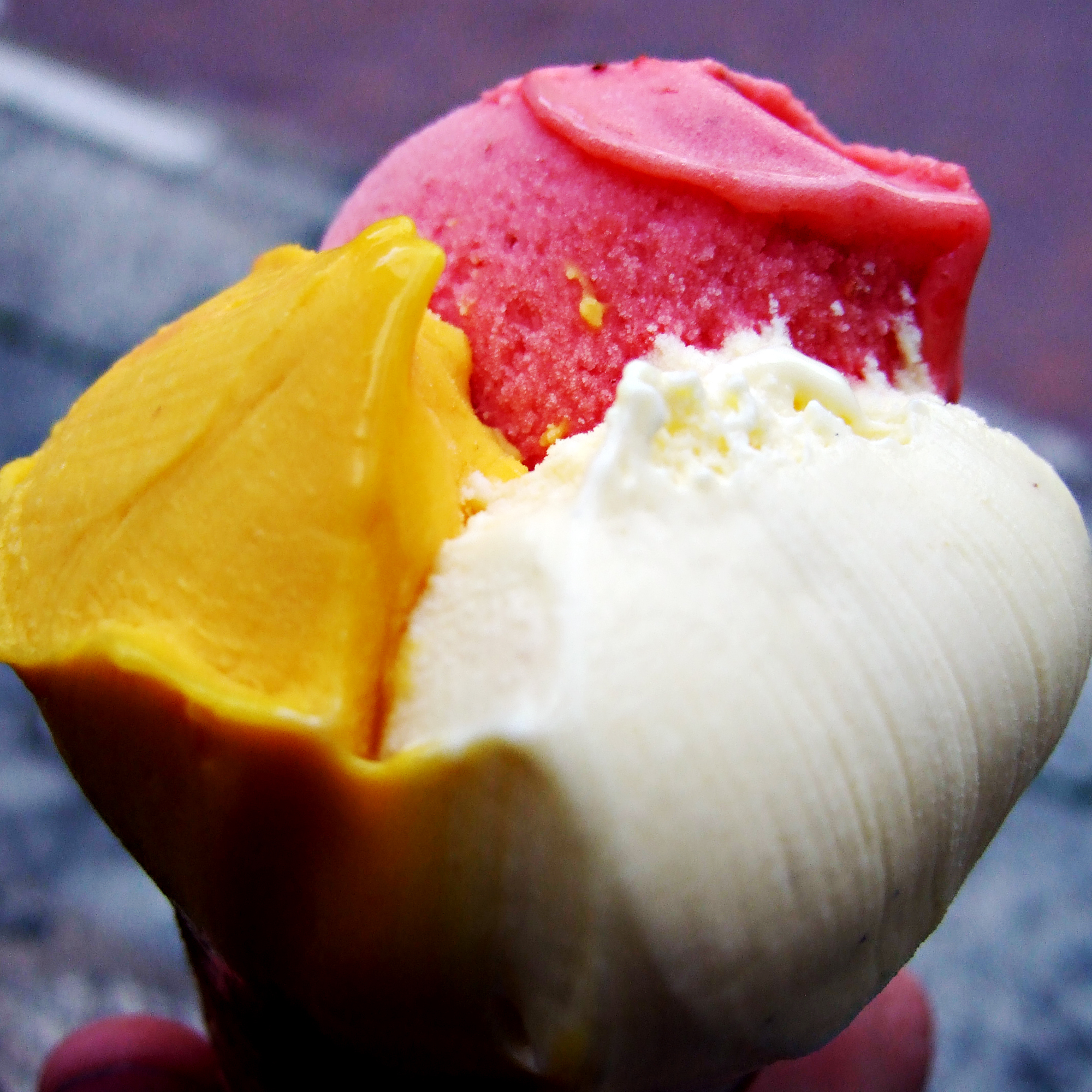
Gelato is Italian ice cream.

Christmas in Italy (Italian: Natale, Italian: [naˈtaːle]) begins on 8 December, with the Feast of the Immaculate Conception, the day on which traditionally the Christmas tree is mounted and ends on 6 January, of the following year with the Epiphany (Italian: Epifania, Italian: [epifaˈniːa]). The Christmas cakes pandoro and panettone are popular in the north (pandoro is from Verona, whilst panettone is from Milan); however, they have also become popular desserts in other parts of Italy and abroad. Colomba pasquale is eaten all over the country on Easter day, and is a more traditional alternative to chocolate easter eggs. Tiramisu is a very popular and iconic Italian dessert from Veneto which has become famous worldwide. Other Italian cakes and sweets include cannoli, cassata, fruit-shaped marzipans, and panna cotta.

Coffee, and more specifically espresso, has become highly important to the cuisine of Italy. Cappuccino is also a famous Italian coffee drink, which is usually sweeter and less dark than espresso, and can be served with foam or cream on top, on which chocolate powder and sugar are usually sprinkled. Caffè latte is a mixture of coffee and milk, and is usually drunk at breakfast time (unlike most other Italian coffee types, children and adults drink it). Bicerin is Turin's own coffee, a mix between cappuccino and hot chocolate.

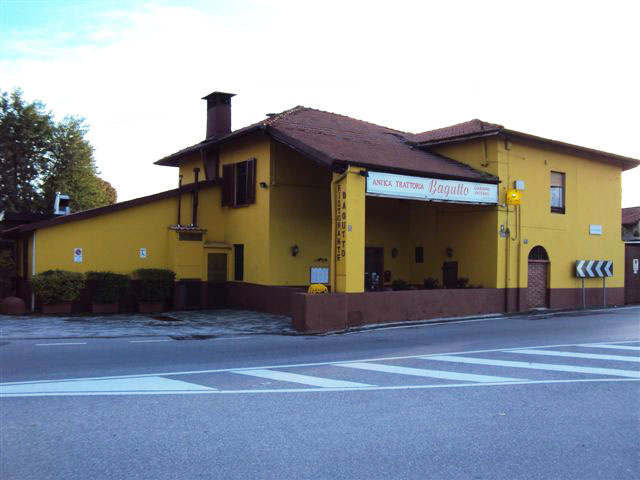
The Antica trattoria Bagutto in Milan, the oldest restaurant in Italy and the second in Europe.

Milan is home to the oldest restaurant in Italy and the second in Europe, the Antica trattoria Bagutto, which has existed since at least 1284. Italian meal structure is typical of the European Mediterranean region and differs from North, Central, and Eastern European meal structure, although it still often consists of breakfast (colazione), lunch (pranzo), and supper (cena). However, much less emphasis is placed on breakfast, and breakfast itself is often skipped or involves lighter meal portions than are seen in non-Mediterranean Western countries. Late-morning and mid-afternoon snacks, called merenda (pl.: merende), are also often included in this meal structure.

Italian cuisine is one of the most popular and copied around the world. The lack or total unavailability of some of its most characteristic ingredients outside of Italy, also and above all to falsifications (or food fraud), leads to the complete denaturalization of Italian ingredients. This phenomenon, widespread in all continents, is better known as "Italian Sounding", consisting in the use of words as well as images, colour combinations (the Italian tricolour), geographical references, brands evocative of Italy to promote and market agri-food products which in reality have nothing to do with Italian cuisine. Italy is home to 395 Michelin star-rated restaurants.

== Education ==
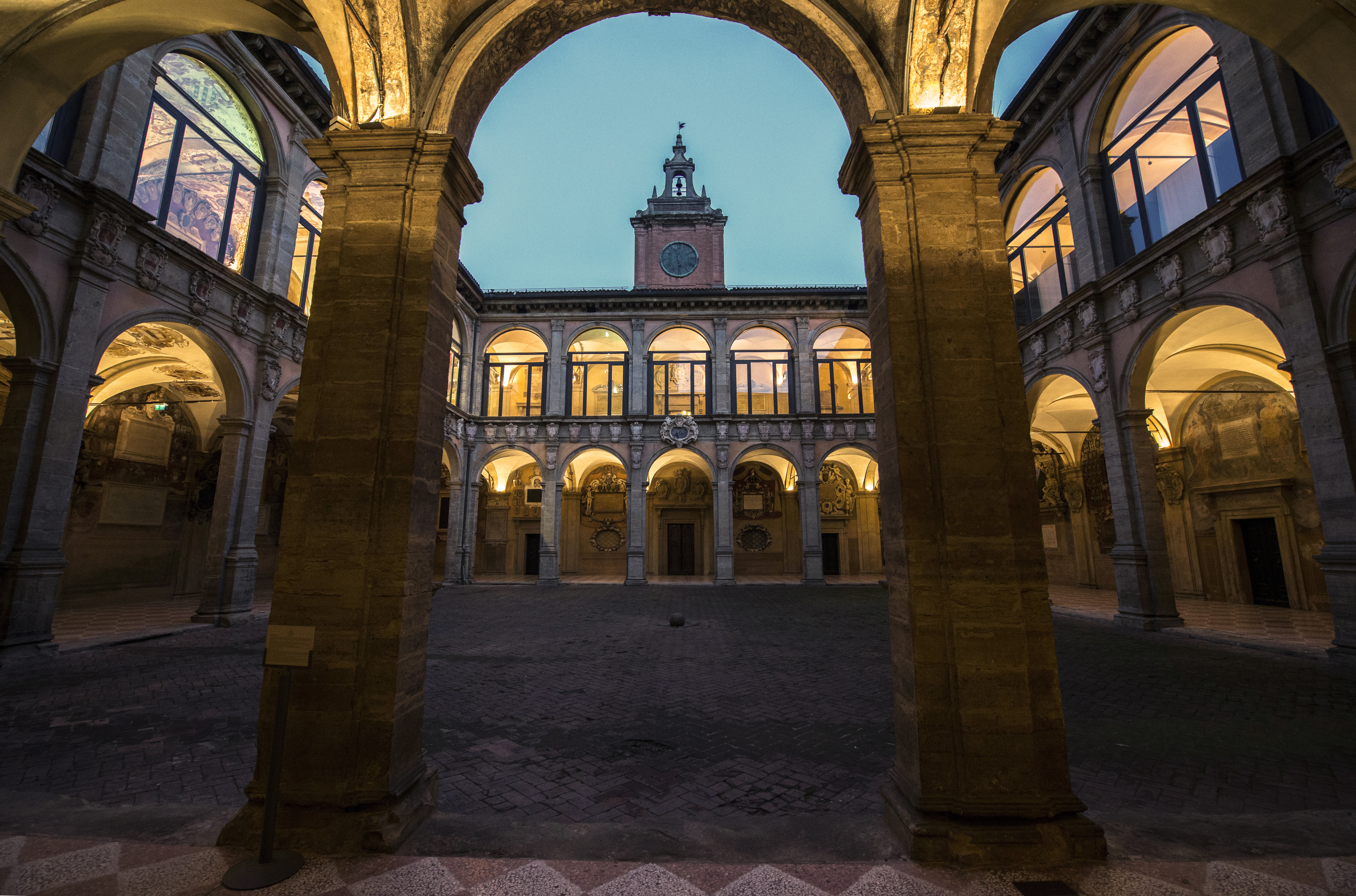
Bologna University, established in AD 1088, is the world's oldest university in continuous operation.

Education in Italy is free and mandatory from ages six to sixteen, and consists of five stages: kindergarten (scuola dell'infanzia), primary school (scuola primaria), lower secondary school (scuola secondaria di primo grado), upper secondary school (scuola secondaria di secondo grado), and university (università).

Primary education lasts five years. Students are given a basic education in Italian, English, mathematics, natural sciences, history, geography, social studies, physical education, and visual and musical arts. Secondary education lasts for five years and includes three traditional types of schools focused on different academic levels: the liceo prepares students for university studies with a classical or scientific curriculum, while the istituto tecnico and the istituto professionale prepare pupils for vocational education.

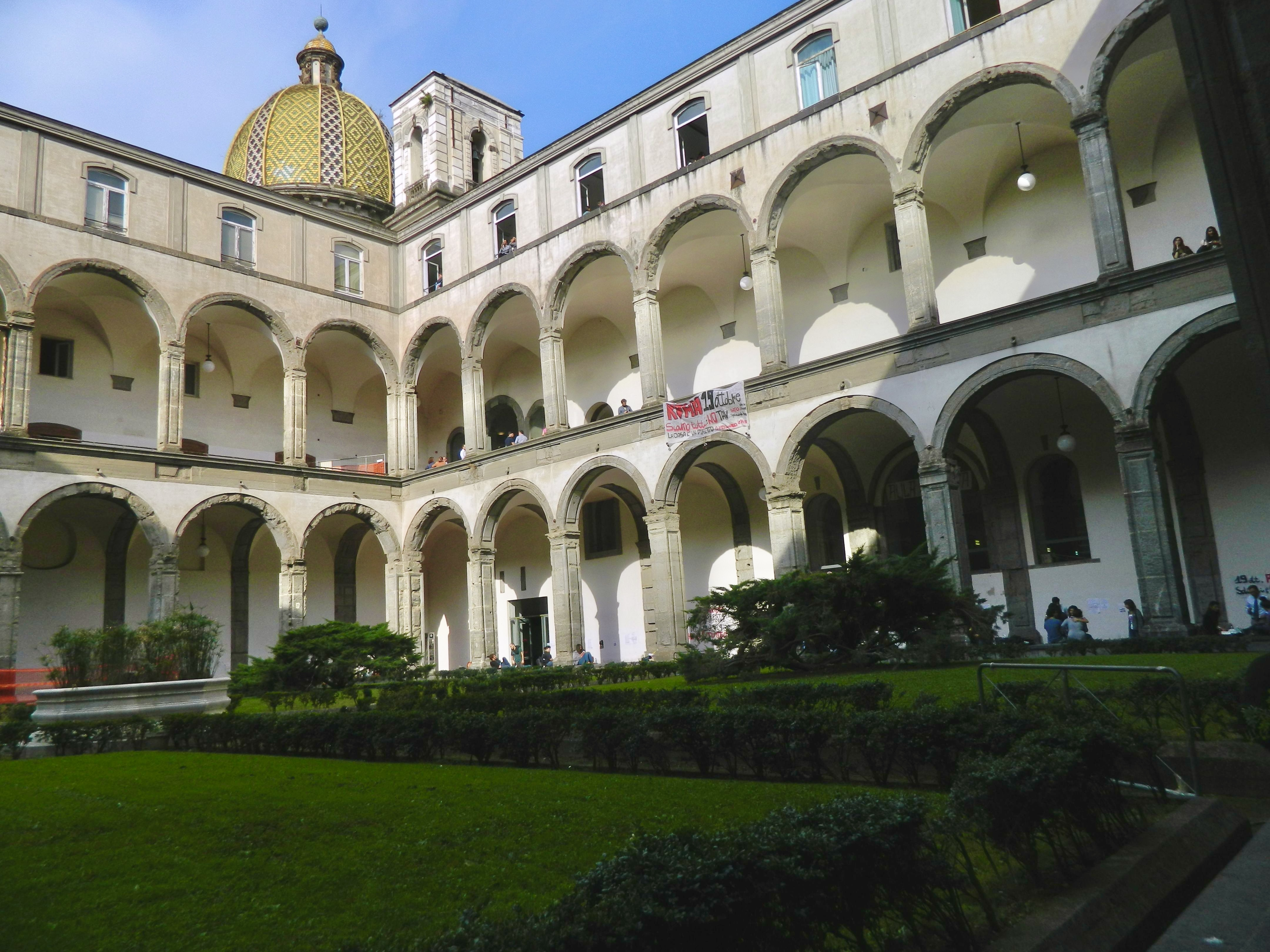
Established in 1224 by Frederick II, Holy Roman Emperor, University of Naples Federico II, in Italy, is the world's oldest state-funded university in continuous operation.

In 2018, the Italian secondary education was evaluated as below the OECD average. Italy scored below the OECD average in reading and science, and near OECD average in mathematics. Trento and Bolzano scored above the national average in reading. A wide gap exists between northern schools, which perform near average, and schools in the south, that had much poorer results.

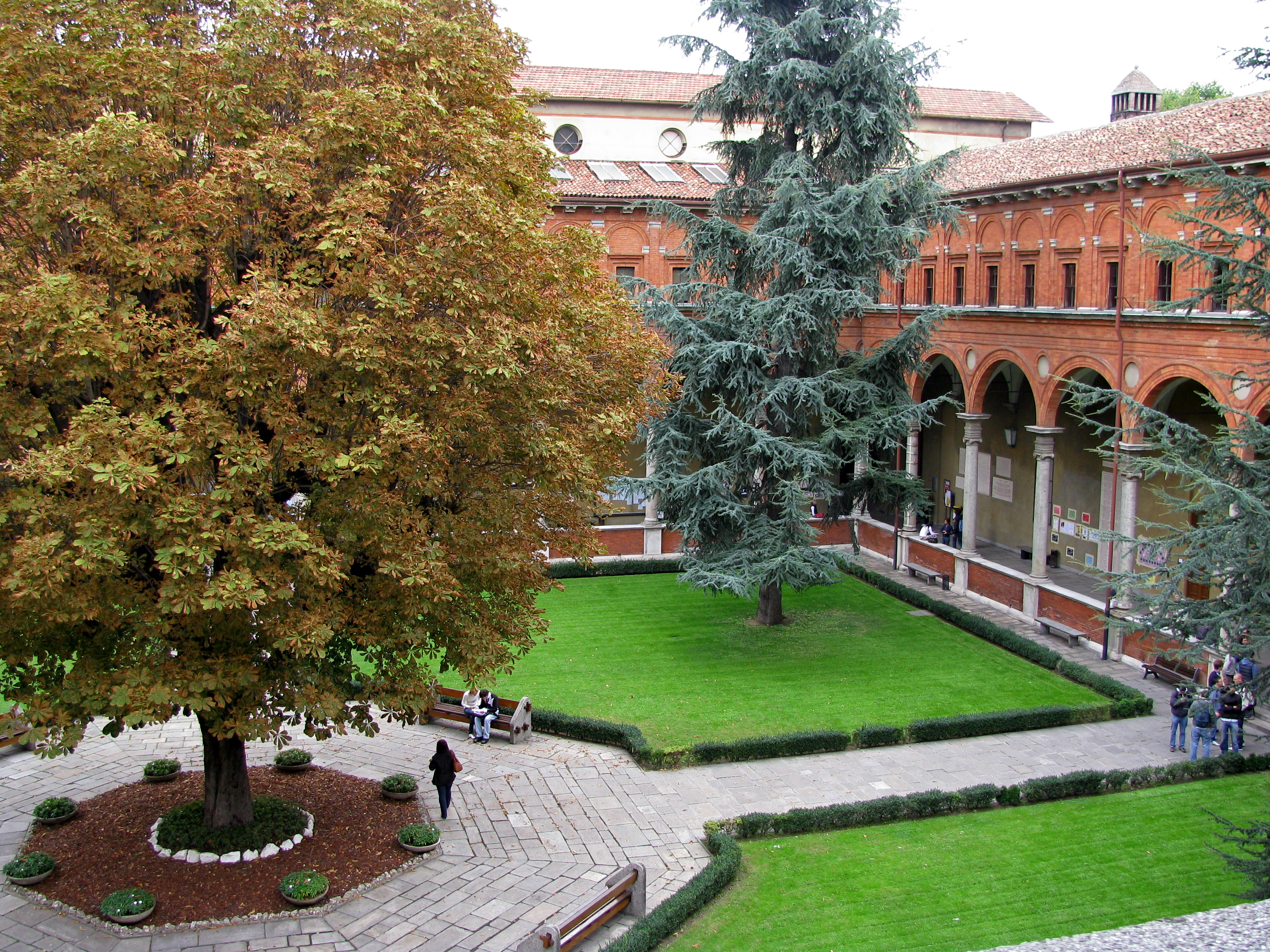
Università Cattolica del Sacro Cuore

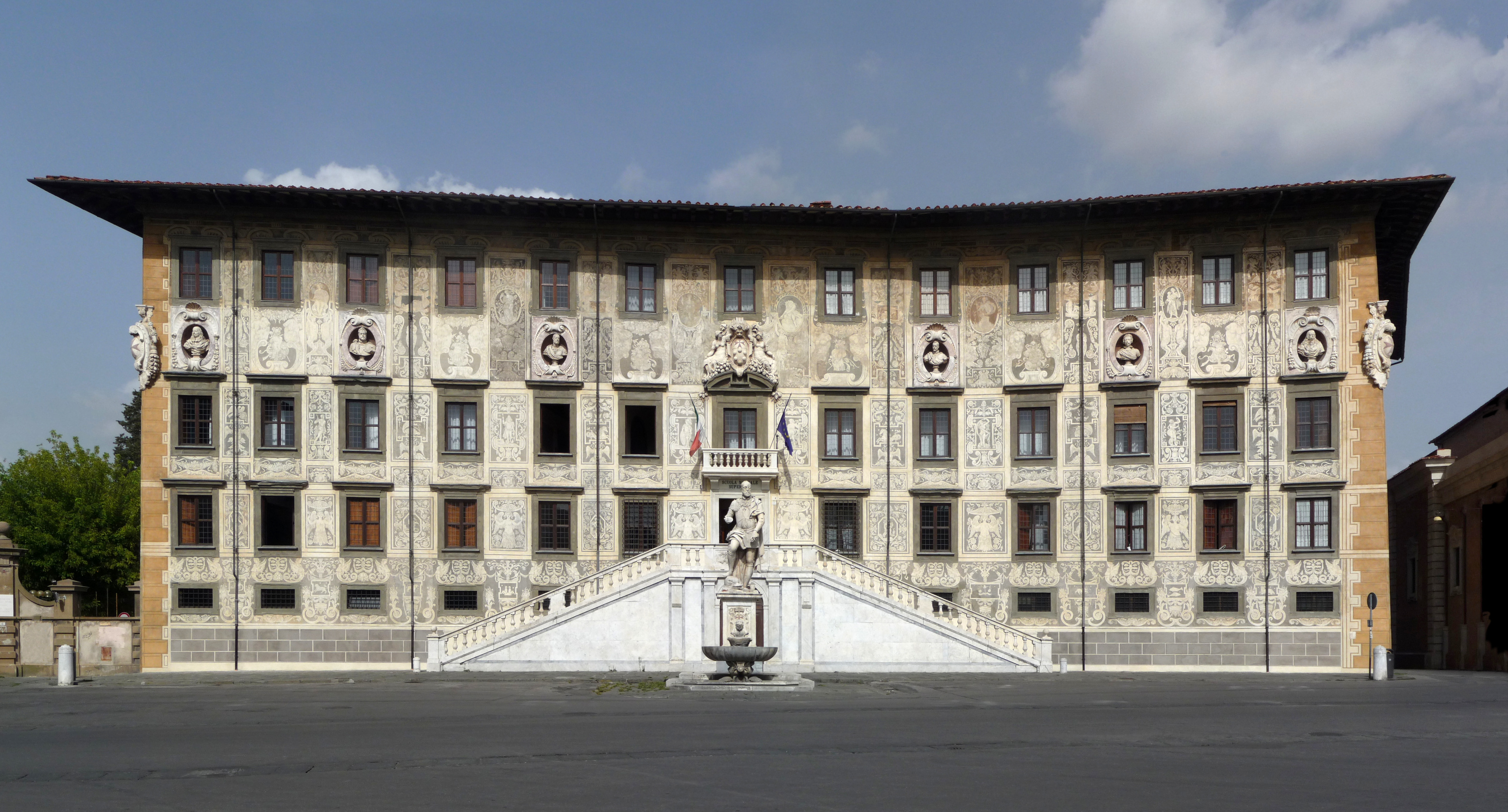
Palazzo della Carovana, the current seat of the Scuola Normale Superiore di Pisa

Tertiary education in Italy is divided between public universities, private universities, and the prestigious and selective superior graduate schools, such as the Scuola Normale Superiore di Pisa. 33 Italian universities were ranked among the world's top 500 in 2019, the third-largest number in Europe after the United Kingdom and Germany. Bologna University, founded in 1088, is the oldest university in continuous operation, and the first university in the sense of a higher-learning and degree-awarding institute, as the word universitas was coined at its foundation, as well as one of the leading academic institutions in Italy and Europe. The Sapienza University of Rome, founded with the Papal bull In supremae praeminentia dignitatis issued on 20 April 1303 by Pope Boniface VIII, is the largest EU university by enrollments, and at the same time it is present in all major international university rankings.

Milan's Bocconi University has been ranked among the top 20 best business schools in the world by The Wall Street Journal international rankings, especially thanks to its Master of Business Administration program, which in 2007 placed it no. 17 in the world in terms of graduate recruitment preference by major multinational companies. In addition, Forbes has ranked Bocconi no. 1 worldwide in the specific category Value for Money. In May 2008, Bocconi overtook several traditionally top global business schools in the Financial Times executive education ranking, reaching no. 5 in Europe and no. 15 in the world. Other top universities and polytechnics include the Polytechnic University of Milan and Polytechnic University of Turin.

In 2009, an Italian research ranked the Sapienza University of Rome and the University of Milan as the best in Italy (over indicators such as scientific production, attraction of foreign students, and others), whose research and teaching activities have developed over the years and have received important international recognitions. The University of Milan is the only Italian member of the League of European Research Universities, a prestigious group of twenty research-intensive European Universities. Sapienza is member of several international groups, such as European Spatial Development Planning, Partnership of a European Group of Aeronautics and Space Universities, CINECA, Santander Network, Institutional Network of the Universities from the Capitals of Europe, and Mediterranean Universities Union.

== Folklore and mythology ==
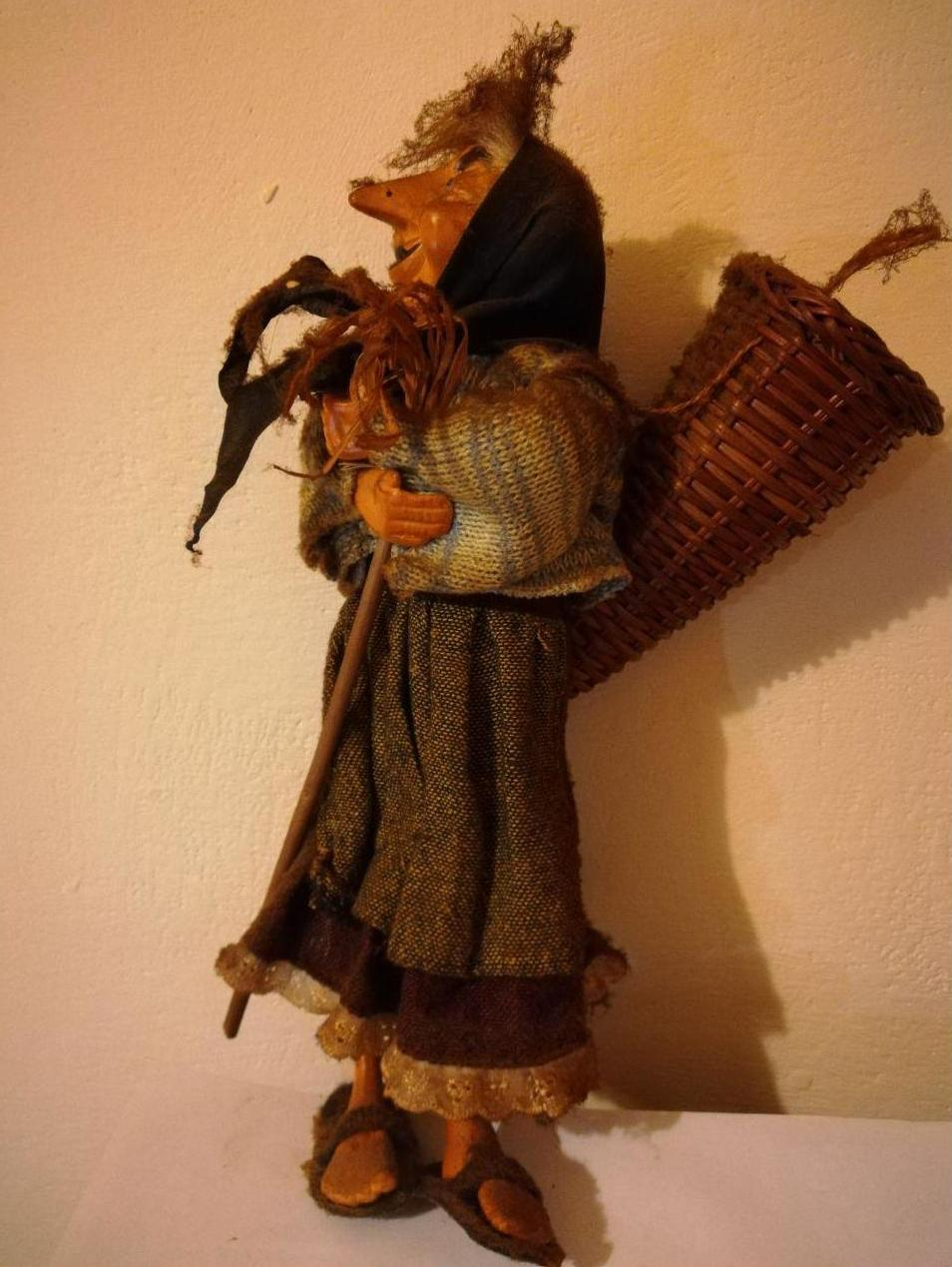
A wooden puppet depicting the Befana

Folklore of Italy refers to the folklore and urban legends of Italy. On the Italian territory, in fact, different peoples have followed one another over time, each of which has left its traces in the popular imagination. Some tales also come from Christianization, especially those concerning demons, which are sometimes recognised by Christian demonology.

In Italian folklore, the Befana is an old woman who delivers gifts to children throughout Italy on Epiphany Eve (the night of 5 January) in a similar way to Santa Claus or the Three Magi Kings. A popular belief is that her name derives from the Feast of Epiphany (Italian: Festa dell'Epifania). In popular folklore, the Befana visits all the children of Italy on the eve of the Feast of the Epiphany to fill their socks with candy and presents if they are good, or a lump of coal or dark candy if they are bad. In many poorer parts of Italy and in particular rural Sicily, a stick in a stocking was placed instead of coal. Being a good housekeeper, many say she will sweep the floor before she leaves. To some, the sweeping meant the sweeping away of the problems of the year. The child's family typically leaves a small glass of wine and a plate with a few morsels of food, often regional or local, for the Befana.

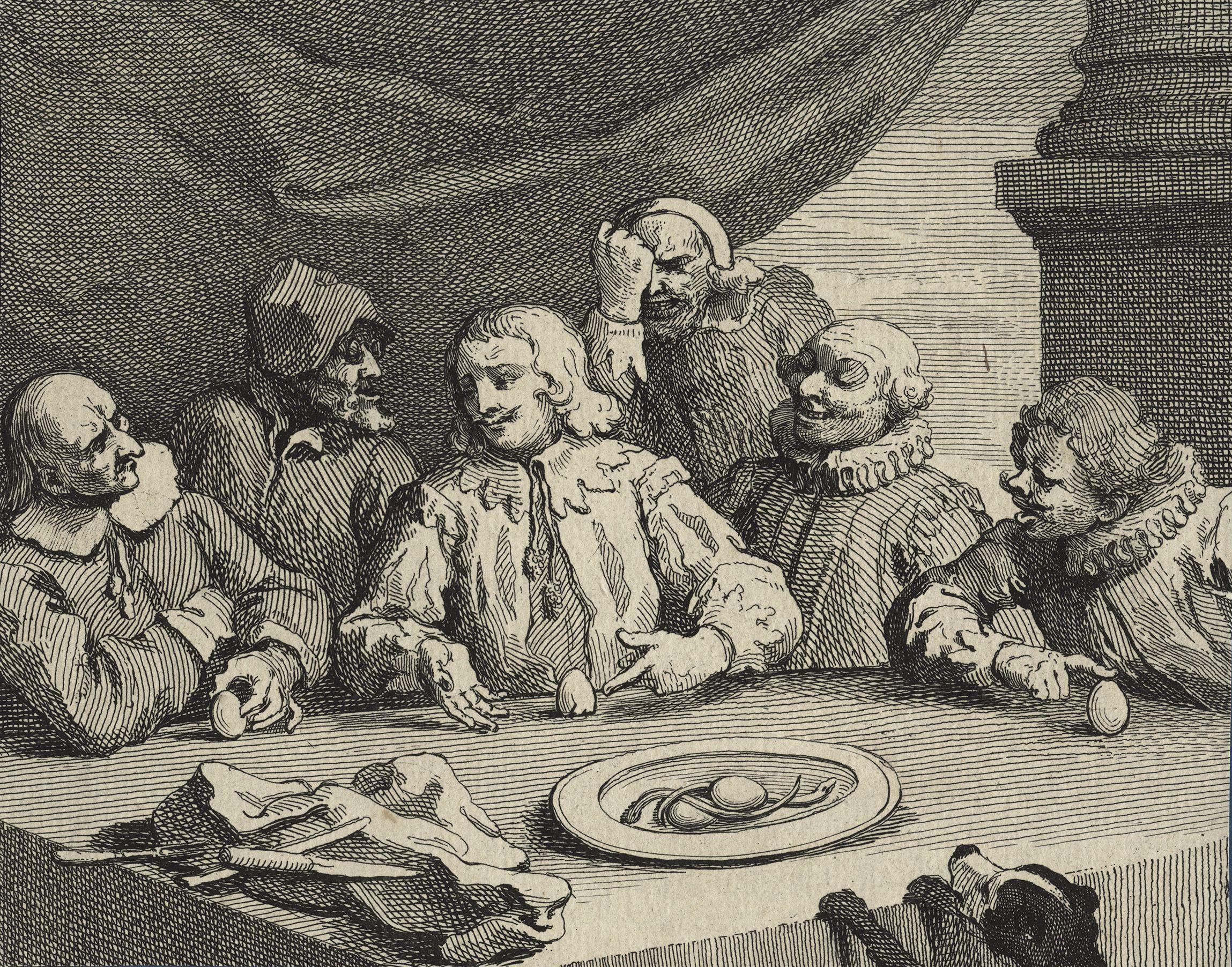
Columbus Breaking the Egg by William Hogarth, 1752

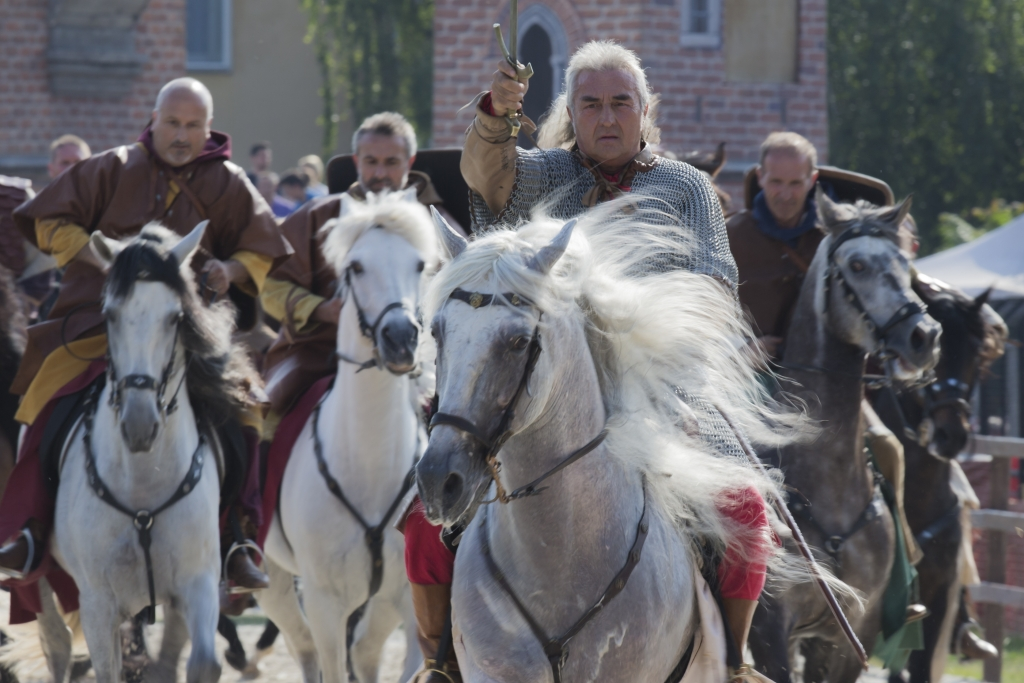
Folkloristic reconstruction of the Company of Death led by Alberto da Giussano who is preparing to carry out the charge during the battle of Legnano at the Palio di Legnano 2014

The Badalisc is a mythical creature of the Val Camonica in the southern central Alps. The Badalisc is represented today as a creature with a big head covered with a goat skin, two small horns, a huge mouth and glowing eyes. According to legend the Badalisc lives in the woods around the village of Andrista (comune of Cevo) and is supposed to annoy the community: each year it is captured during the period of Epiphany (5 & 6 January) and led on a rope into the village by musicians and masked characters, including il giovane ('the young man'), il vecchio ('the old man'), la vecchia ('the old woman'), and la signorina ('the young woman'), who is "bait" for the animal's lust. There are also some old witches, who beat drums, and bearded shepherds, and a hunchback (un torvo gobetto) who has a "rustic duel" with the animal. Traditionally only men take part, although some are dressed as women. In medieval times women were prohibited from participating in the exhibition, or even seeing or hearing the Badalisc's Speech; if they did so they would be denied Holy Communion the following day.

An egg of Columbus refers to a brilliant idea or discovery that seems simple or easy after the fact. The expression refers to an apocryphal story, dating from at least the 16th century, in which it is said that Christopher Columbus, having been told that finding a new trade route was inevitable and no great accomplishment, challenges his critics to make an egg stand on its tip. After his challengers give up, Columbus does it himself by tapping the egg on the table to flatten its tip. The story is often alluded to when discussing creativity. The term has also been used as the trade name of a tangram puzzle and several mechanical puzzles.

Alberto da Giussano is a legendary character of the 12th century who would have participated, as a protagonist, in the battle of Legnano on 29 May 1176. In reality, according to historians, the actual military leader of the Lombard League in the famous military battle with Frederick Barbarossa was Guido da Landriano. Historical analyses made over time have indeed shown that the figure of Alberto da Giussano never existed. In the past, historians, attempting to find a real confirmation, hypothesised the identification of his figure with Albertus de Carathe (Alberto da Carate) and Albertus Longus (Alberto Longo), both among the Milanese who signed the pact in Cremona in March 1167 which established the Lombard League, or in an Alberto da Giussano mentioned in an appeal of 1196 presented to Pope Celestine III on the administration of the church-hospital of San Sempliciano. These, however, are all weak identifications, given that they lack clear and convincing historical confirmation.

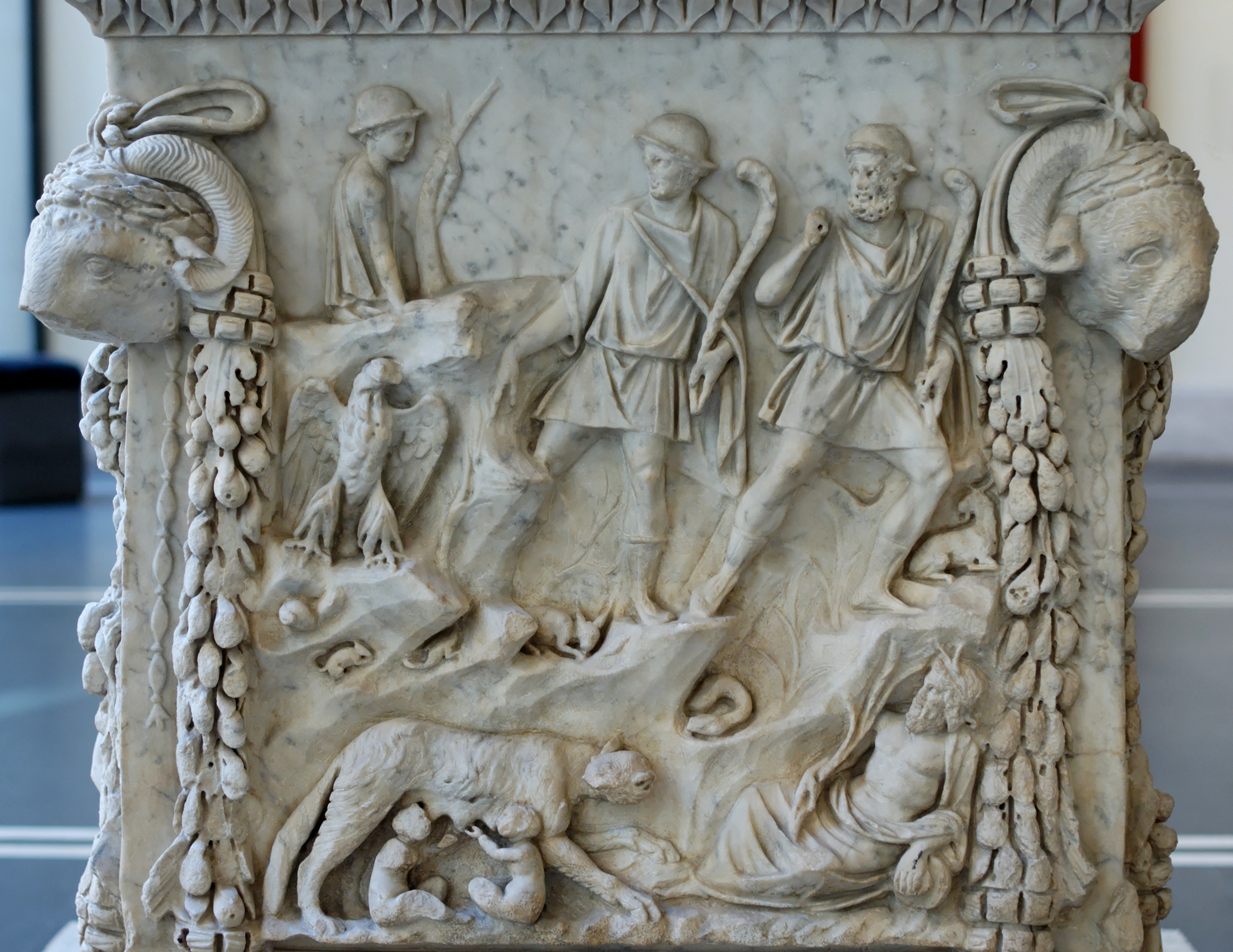
Romulus and Remus, the Lupercal, Father Tiber, and the Palatine on a relief from a pedestal dating to the reign of Trajan (AD 98–117)

The Val Camonica witch trials were two large witch trials which took place in Val Camonica, in Italy, in 1505–1510 and 1518–1521. They were among the biggest Italian witch trials, and caused the deaths of about 60 persons, in each trial: 110 in total. The best source for the trials is considered to be the Venetian Marin Sanudo, who was the chronicler to the Council of Ten from 1496 to 1536. The documentary evidence was destroyed by order of Giacinto Gaggia, the bishop of Brescia, to prevent it from being used by the anticlerical opposition.

Mythology of Italy refers to the mythology of people living in Italy. Major pantheons belong to Roman mythology and Etruscan mythology. Roman mythology is the body of myths of ancient Rome as represented in the literature and visual arts of the Romans. One of a wide variety of genres of Roman folklore, Roman mythology may also refer to the modern study of these representations, and to the subject matter as represented in the literature and art of other cultures in any period. Roman mythology draws from the mythology of the Italic peoples and ultimately from Proto-Indo-European mythology. Roman mythology also draws directly on Greek mythology, potentially as early as Rome's protohistory, but primarily during the Hellenistic period of Greek influence and through the Roman conquest of Greece, via the artistic imitation of Greek literary models by Roman authors.

== Italophilia ==
The Roman Empire provided an inspiration for the medieval European. Although the Holy Roman Empire rarely acquired a serious geopolitical reality, it possessed great symbolic significance.

Ancient Italy is identified with Rome and the so-called Romanophilia. Despite the fall of the Roman Empire, its legacy continued to have a significant impact on the cultural and political life in Europe. For the medieval mind, Rome came to constitute a central dimension of the European traditionalist sensibility. The idealisation of this Empire as the symbol of universal order led to the construction of the Holy Roman Empire. Writing before the outbreak of the First World War, the historian Alexander Carlyle noted that "we can without difficulty recognise" not only "the survival of the tradition of the ancient empire", but also a "form of the perpetual aspiration to make real the dream of the universal commonwealth of humanity".

William Shakespeare is an example of an Italophile of the 16th century.

During much of the Middle Ages (about the 5th century through the 15th century), the Roman Catholic Church had great political power in Western Europe. Throughout its history, the Catholic faith has inspired many great works of architecture, art, literature, and music. These works include French medieval Gothic cathedrals, the Italian artist Michelangelo's frescoes in the Vatican, the Italian writer Dante's epic poem Divine Comedy, and the Austrian composer Wolfgang Amadeus Mozart's Requiem.

As for Italian artists they were in demand almost all over Europe. Torrigiano and Zuccari worked in England, Masolino in Hungary, Luca Cambiasi and Pellegrino Tibaldi in Spain, Jacopo Sansovino in Portugal, Morando, and others in Poland. The demand seems to have been greatest in France, more especially at the French court, which employed (among others) Leonardo da Vinci, Rosso, Primaticcio, Niccolò dell'Abbate, and Sebastiano Serlio. Italian craftsmen were engaged to work on building sites from Munich to Zamość. Italian actors performed at the courts of France, Spain, Poland, and elsewhere.

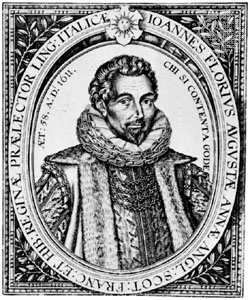
John Florio is recognised as the most important Renaissance humanist in England.

The Italian language was fashionable, at court for example, as well as Italian literature and art. The famous lexicographer John Florio of Italian origin was the most important humanist in Renaissance England. and contributed to the English language with over 1,969 words. William Shakespeare's works show an important level of Italophilia, a deep knowledge of Italy and the Italian culture, like in Romeo and Juliet and The Merchant of Venice. According to Robin Kirkpatrick, Professor of Italian and English Literatures at Cambridge University, Shakespeare shared "with his contemporaries and immediate forebears a fascination with Italy". In 16th-century Spain, cultural Italophilia was also widespread (while the Spanish influence in southern Italy was also great) and king Philip IV himself considered Italian as his favourite foreign language.

The movement of "international Italophilia" around 1600 certainly held the German territories in its sway, with one statistic suggesting that up to a third of all books available in Germany in the early 17th century were in Italian. Themes and styles from Il pastor fido were adapted endlessly by German artists, including Opitz, who wrote several poems based on Guarini's text, and Schütz himself, whose settings of a handful of passages appeared in his 1611 book of Italian madrigals. Emperors Ferdinand III and Leopold I were great admirers of Italian culture and made Italian (which they themselves spoke perfectly) a prestigious language at their court. German baroque composers or architects were also very much influenced by their Italian counterparts.

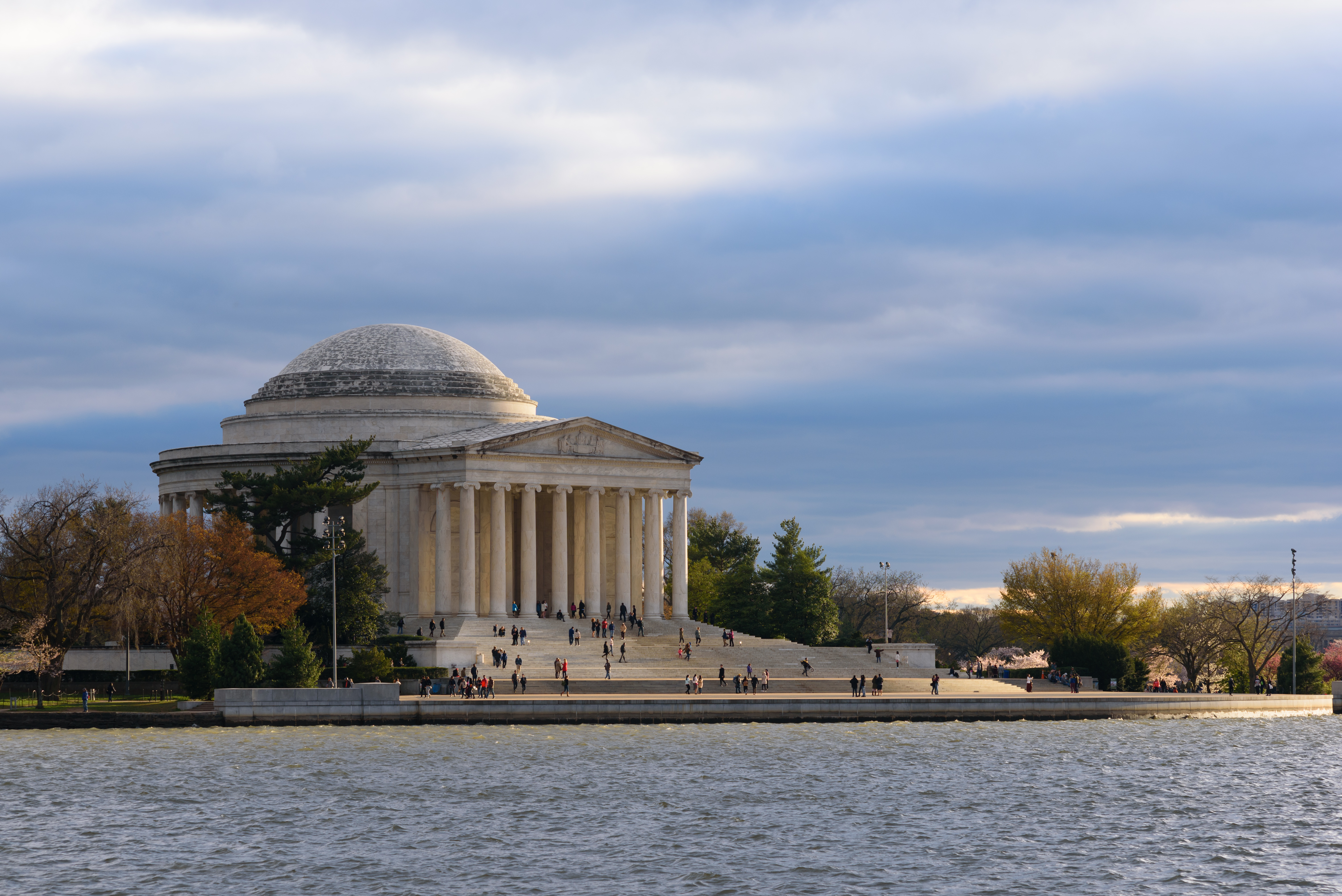
The Jefferson Memorial in Washington, D.C. reflects the president's admiration for classical Roman aesthetics.

During the 18th century, Italy was in the spotlight of the European grand tour, a period in which learned and wealthy foreign, usually British or German, aristocrats visited the country due to its artistic, cultural and archaeological richness. Since then, throughout the centuries, many writers and poets have sung of Italy's beauty; from Goethe to Stendhal to Byron, Italy's natural beauty and her people's creativity inspired their works. Percy Bysshe Shelley famously said that Italy is "the paradise of exiles".

Italiophilia was not uncommon in the United States. Thomas Jefferson was a great admirer of Italy and ancient Rome. Jefferson is largely responsible for the neo-classical buildings in Washington, D.C. that echo Roman and Italian architectural styles.

Spain provided an equally telling example of Italian cultural admiration in the 18th century. The installation of a team of Italian architects and artists, headed by Filippo Juvarra, has been interpreted as part of Queen Elisabeth Farnese's conscious policy to mould the visual culture of the Spanish court along Italian lines. The engagement of Corrado Giaquinto from Molfetta and eventually the Venetian Jacopo Amigoni as the creators of the painted decorative space for the new seat of the Spanish court was a clear indication of this aesthetic orientation, while the later employment of Giovanni Battista Tiepolo and his son Giovanni Domenico confirmed the Italophile tendency.

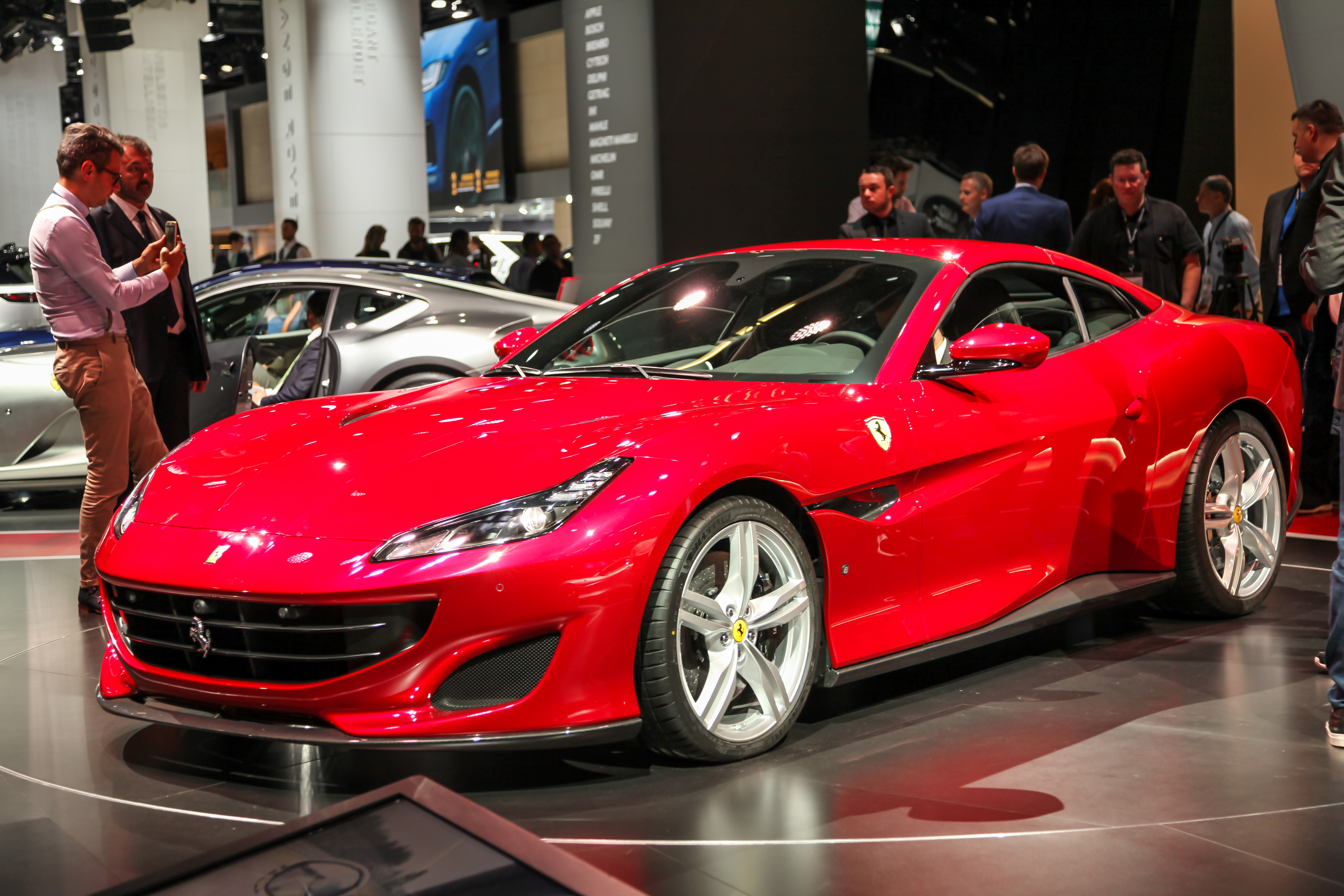
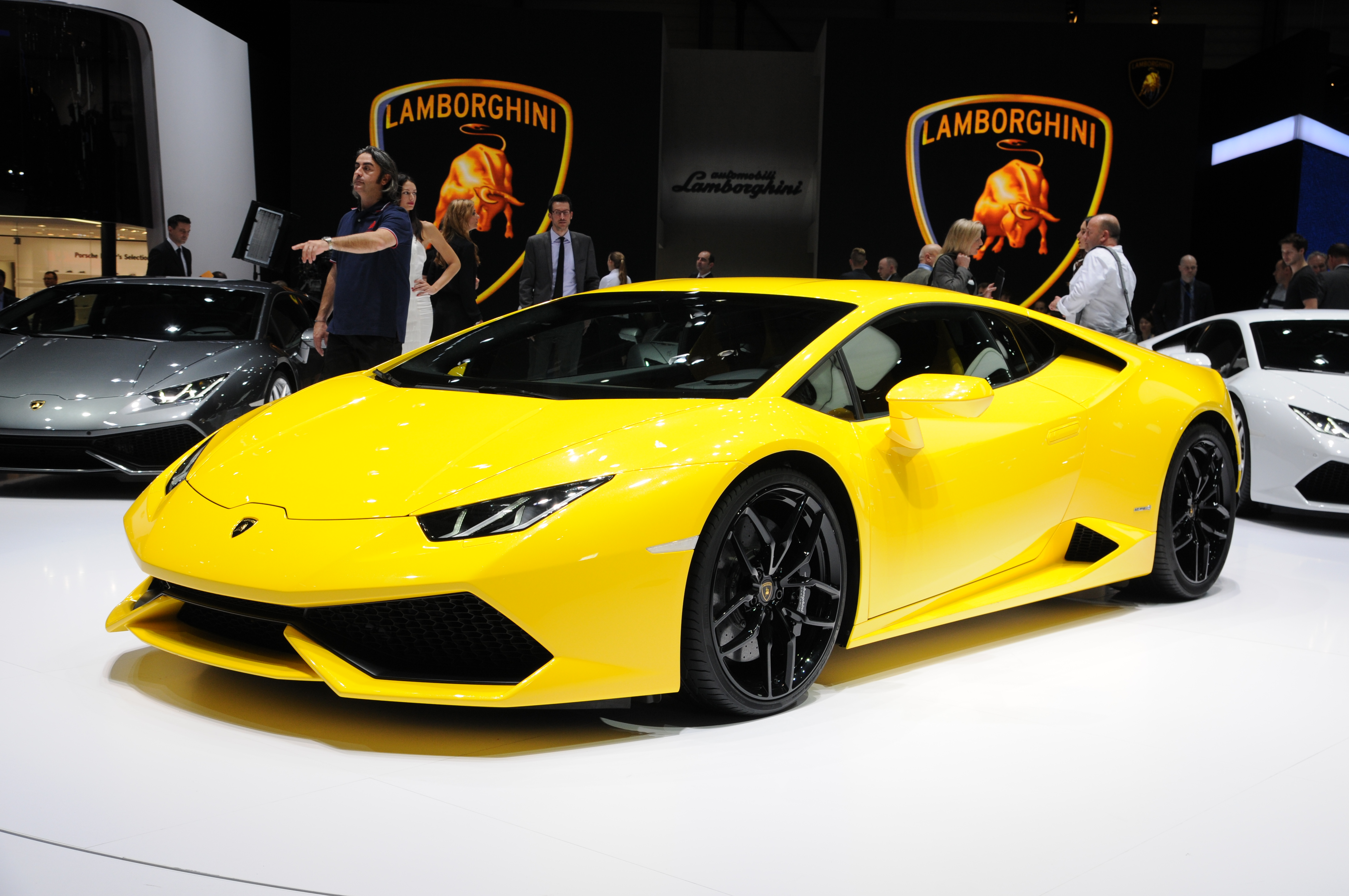
A Ferrari Portofino (left) and a Lamborghini Huracán (right). Ferrari and Lamborghini are two of the most popular and acclaimed Italian brands.

The Victorian era in Great Britain saw Italophilic tendencies. Britain supported its own version of the imperial Pax Romana, called Pax Britannica. John Ruskin was a Victorian Italophile who respected the concepts of morality held in Italy. Also the writer Henry James has exhibited Italophilia in several of his novels. However, Ellen Moers writes that, "In the history of Victorian Italophilia no name is more prominent than that of Elizabeth Barrett Browning....[She places] Italy as the place for the woman of genius ..."

Italian patriot Giuseppe Garibaldi, along with Giuseppe Mazzini and Camillo Benso, Count of Cavour, led the struggle for Italian unification in the 19th century. For his battles on behalf of freedom in Europe and Latin America, Garibaldi has been dubbed the "Hero of Two Worlds". Many of the greatest intellectuals of his time, such as Victor Hugo, Alexandre Dumas, and George Sand showered him with admiration. He was so appreciated in the United States that Abraham Lincoln offered him a command during the Civil War (Garibaldi turned it down).

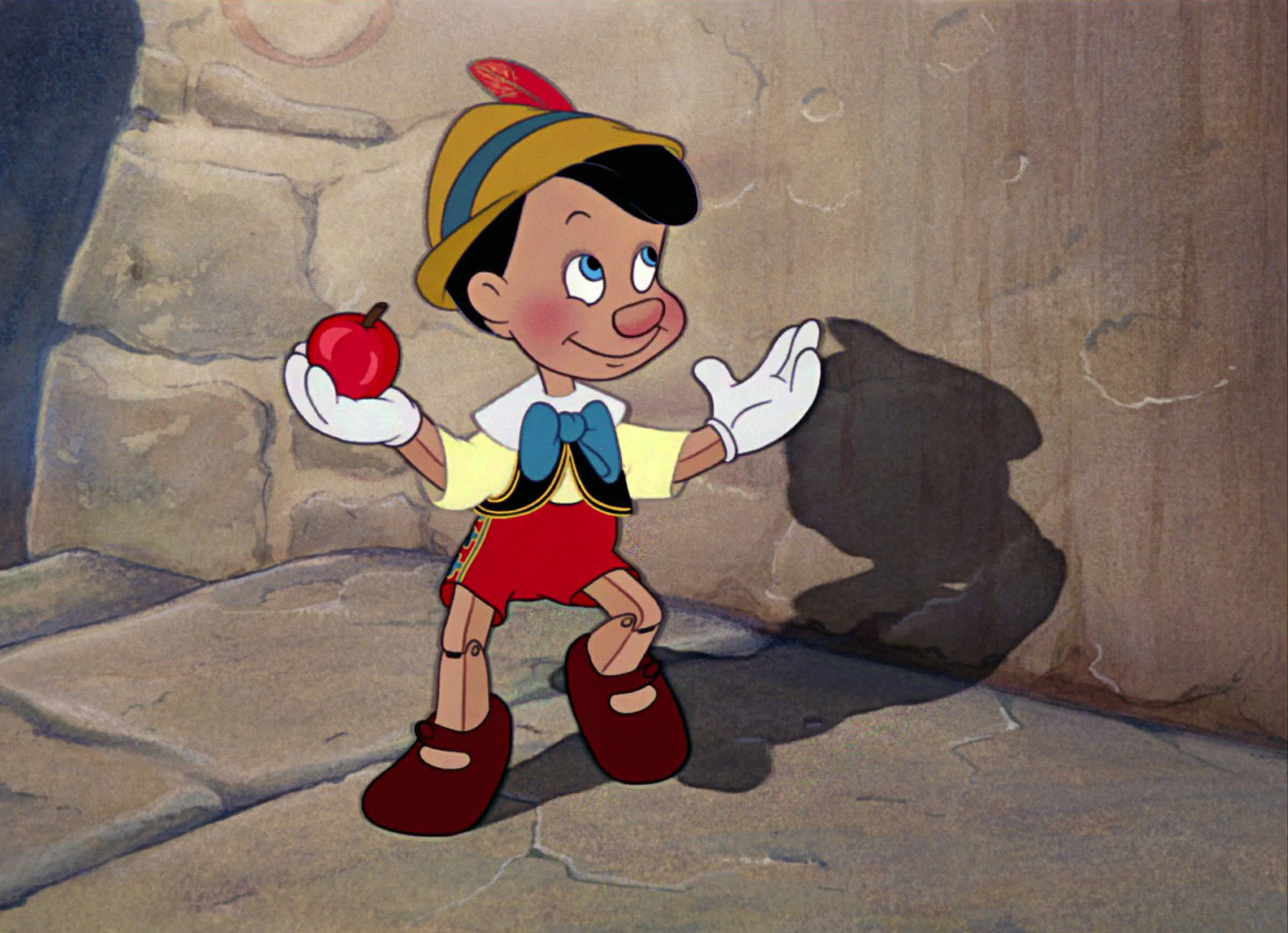
Pinocchio Disney film is based on the 1883 novel The Adventures of Pinocchio by Carlo Collodi.

During the Fascist era, several leaders in Europe and Latin America modelled their government and economic system on Italian Fascism. Adolf Hitler was an avid admirer of Benito Mussolini. To justify his Italophilia, Hitler had to convince himself that northern Italians were somehow racially Aryan—"from the cultural point of view", he once remarked, "we are more closely linked with the Italians than with any other people"—and that the veins of Mussolini, Dante and other heroes pulsed with no contaminating blood from the inferior "Mediterranean race". Or "The Italians have a splendid foundation of the peasantry. Once when I was travelling to Florence, I thought, as I passed through it, what a paradise this land of southern France is! But when I reached Italy – then I realised what a paradise on earth can really be!". The Führer also dreamed of touring Tuscany and Umbria: "my dearest wish would be to be able to wander about Italy as an unknown painter."

In 1940 Walt Disney Productions produced Pinocchio based on the 1883 Italian children's novel The Adventures of Pinocchio by Carlo Collodi, the most translated non-religious book in the world and one of the best-selling books ever published, as well as a canonical piece of children's literature. The film was the second animated feature film produced by Disney.

After World War II, such brands as Ferrari and Alfa Romeo became well known for racing and sports cars. Since then Italy has experienced strong economic growth, particularly in the 1950s and 1960s, which lifted the country to the position of being one of the most industrialised nations in the world. Italian product design, fashion, film, and cuisine and the notion of Italy as the embodiment of La dolce vita for German tourism—all left an imprint on contemporary Italophilia.

== Italian people ==
The Italian Peninsula has been at the heart of Western cultural development at least since Roman times. Important poets of the Roman republic and empire were Lucretius, Catullus, Virgil, Horace, and Ovid. Also prominent in Latin literature were the orator-rhetorician Cicero, the satirist Juvenal, the prose writers Pliny the Elder and his nephew Pliny the Younger, and the historians Sallust, Livy, and Suetonius. Julius Caesar, renowned as a historian and prose stylist, is even more famous as a military and political leader. Roman jurists founded and developed Roman law, which still today represents the basic framework of civil law, the most widespread legal system in the world. Among the most famous jurists are Gaius, Ulpianus, Papinianus, and Paulus. Italy, as the center of Magna Graecia, was also the land that gave birth to personalities such as Archimedes, Pythagoras, Parmenides, Zeno, and Gorgia. The first of the Roman emperors was Octavian, better known by the honorific Augustus. Noteworthy among later emperors are the tyrants Caligula and Nero, the philosopher-statesman Marcus Aurelius, and Constantine I, who was the first to accept Christianity. The history of the Christian Church during the medieval period would not be complete without mention of such men of Italian birth as Benedict of Nursia, Pope Gregory I, Francis of Assisi, and the philosopher-theologians Anselm of Canterbury, Joachim of Fiore, and Thomas Aquinas.

Sicilian kings and emperors such as Roger II of Sicily and Frederick II of the Kingdom of Sicily had a significant impact on Italian culture and unified Italy for the first time. No land has made a greater contribution to the visual arts. In the 13th and 14th centuries there were the sculptors Nicola Pisano and his son Giovanni; the painters Cimabue, Duccio, and Giotto; and, later in the period, the sculptor Andrea Pisano. Among the many great artists of the 15th century—the golden age of Florence and Venice—were the architects Filippo Brunelleschi, Lorenzo Ghiberti, and Leon Battista Alberti; the sculptors Donatello, Luca della Robbia, Desiderio da Settignano, and Andrea del Verrocchio; and the painters Fra Angelico, Stefano di Giovanni, Paolo Uccello, Masaccio, Frà Filippo Lippi, Piero della Francesca, Giovanni Bellini, Andrea Mantegna, Antonello da Messina, Antonio del Pollaiuolo, Luca Signorelli, Pietro Perugino, Sandro Botticelli, Domenico Ghirlandaio, and Vittore Carpaccio.

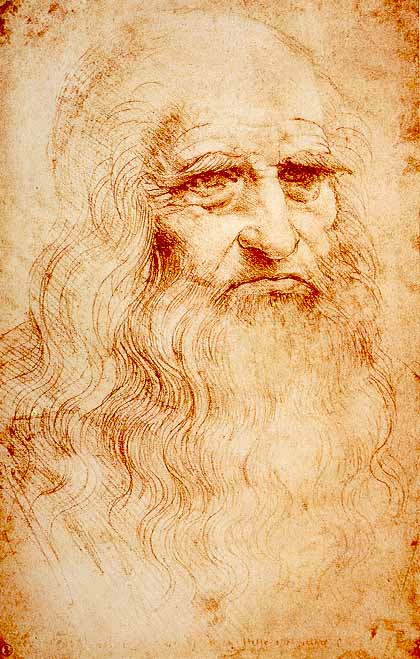
Leonardo da Vinci, a polymath of the High Renaissance who was active as a painter, draughtsman, engineer, scientist, theorist, sculptor, and architect

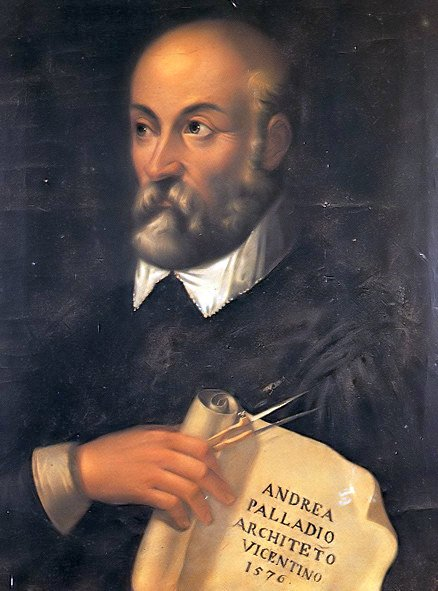
Andrea Palladio is often described as the most influential architect in the Western world.

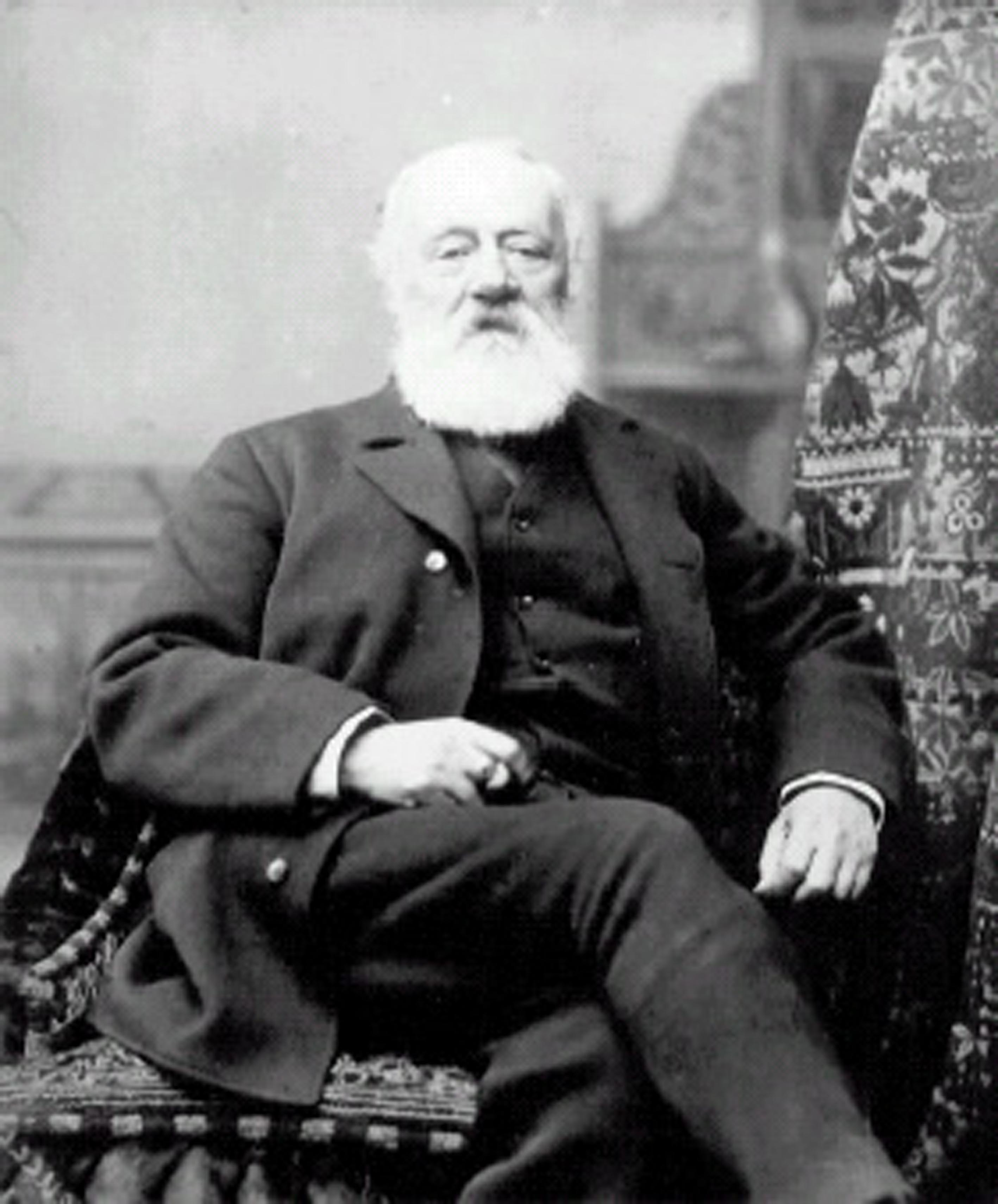
Antonio Meucci, inventor of the first telephone

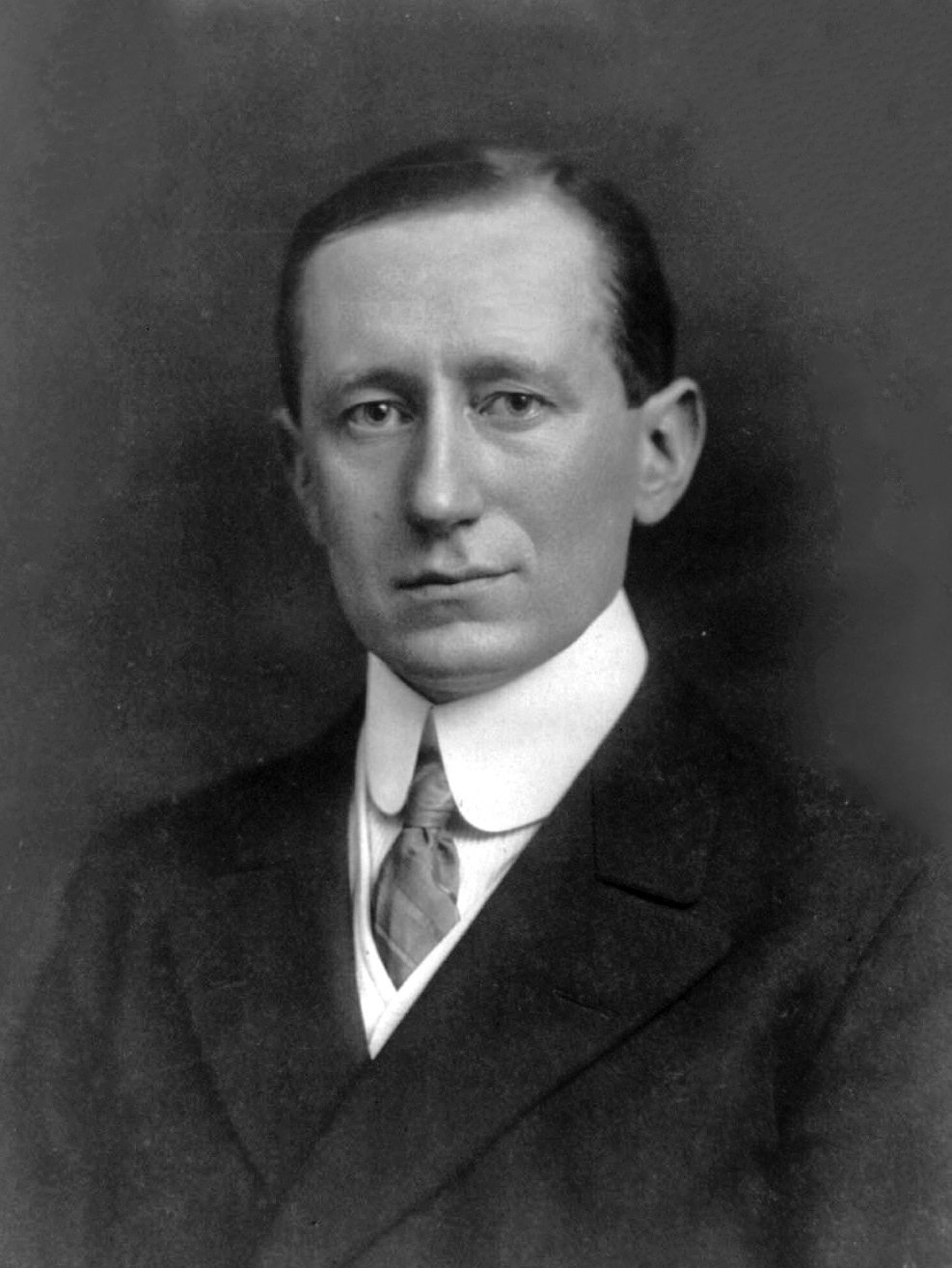
Guglielmo Marconi was the inventor of radio.

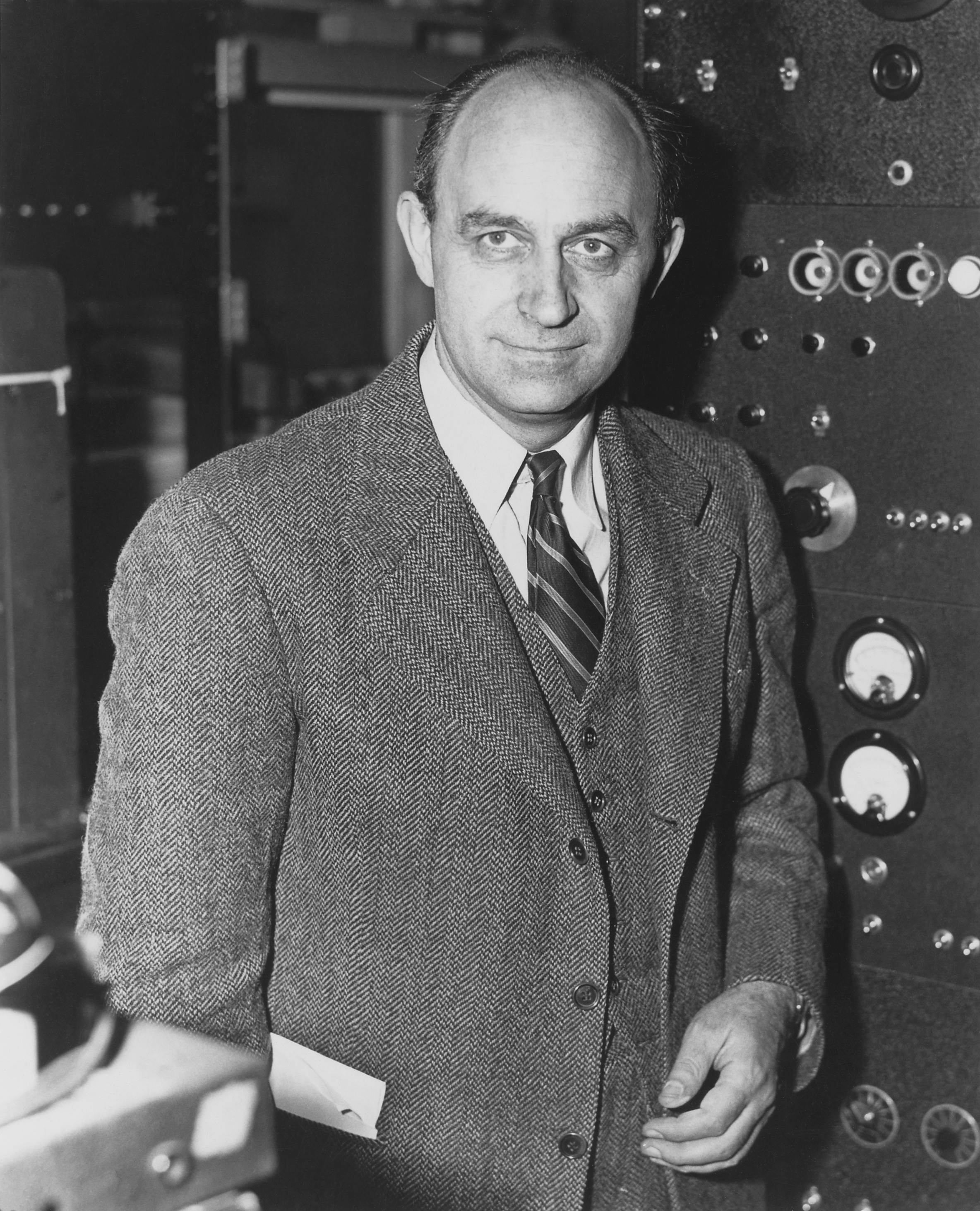
Enrico Fermi, creator of the world's first nuclear reactor

During the 16th century, the High Renaissance, Rome shared with Florence the leading position in the world of the arts. Major masters included the painter-designer-inventor Leonardo da Vinci; the painter-sculptor-architect Michelangelo Buonarroti; the architects Donato Bramante and Andrea Palladio; the sculptor Benvenuto Cellini; and the painters Titian, Giorgione, Raphael, Andrea del Sarto, and Antonio da Correggio. Among the great painters of the late Renaissance were Tintoretto and Paolo Veronese. Giorgio Vasari was a painter, architect, art historian, and critic.

Among the leading artists of the Baroque period were the sculptors-architects Gian Lorenzo Bernini and Francesco Borromini; the architects Bartolomeo Rastrelli, Filippo Juvarra, and Luigi Vanvitelli; and the painters Caravaggio, Guido Reni, Annibale Carracci, Pietro da Cortona, Luca Giordano, Andrea Pozzo, Guercino, Domenichino, Giovanni Battista Tiepolo, Canaletto, Pietro Longhi, and Francesco Guardi. Leading figures in modern painting were Umberto Boccioni, Amedeo Modigliani, Giorgio de Chirico, Lucio Fontana, Alberto Burri, and Giorgio Morandi. A noted contemporary architect were Giuseppe Terragni, Marcello Piacentini, Adalberto Libera, Pier Luigi Nervi, Gio Ponti, Aldo Rossi, and Renzo Piano.

Music, an integral part of Italian life, owes many of its forms as well as its language to Italy. The inventor of Gregorian chant was the Roman Pope Gregory I. The musical staff was either invented or established by Guido of Arezzo. A leading 14th-century composer was the blind Florentine organist Francesco Landini. Leading composers of the High Renaissance and early Baroque periods were Giovanni Pierluigi da Palestrina; the madrigalists Luca Marenzio and Carlo Gesualdo, prince of Venosa; the Venetian organists Andrea Gabrieli and Giovanni Gabrieli; Claudio Monteverdi, one of the founders of opera; organist-composer Girolamo Frescobaldi; and Giacomo Carissimi. One of the father of French opera, and master of French baroque style, was the Italian composer, after naturalised French, Jean-Baptiste Lully. Important figures of the later Baroque era were Arcangelo Corelli, Antonio Vivaldi, Luigi Boccherini, Alessandro Scarlatti, and his son Domenico Scarlatti. Italian-born Luigi Cherubini was the central figure of French music in the Napoleonic era, while Antonio Salieri and Gaspare Spontini played important roles in the musical life of Vienna and Berlin, respectively.

Composers of the 19th century who made their period the great age of Italian opera were Gioacchino Rossini, Gaetano Donizetti, Vincenzo Bellini, and, above all, Giuseppe Verdi. Niccolò Paganini was the greatest violinist of his time. More recent operatic composers include Ruggero Leoncavallo, Giacomo Puccini, and Pietro Mascagni. Renowned operatic singers include Enrico Caruso, Luisa Tetrazzini, Titta Ruffo, Amelita Galli-Curci, Beniamino Gigli, Ezio Pinza, and Luciano Pavarotti. Ferruccio Busoni, Ottorino Respighi, Luigi Dallapiccola, Alfredo Casella, Luigi Nono, and Luciano Berio. Arturo Toscanini is generally regarded as one of the greatest operatic and orchestral conductors of his time; two noted contemporary conductors are Claudio Abbado and Riccardo Muti. In the field of music for cinema, great Italian composers were Ennio Morricone, Nino Rota, Armando Trovajoli, and Giorgio Moroder, the father of disco music. The foremost makers of stringed instruments were Gasparo da Salò of Brescia, Nicolò Amati, Antonio Stradivari, and Giuseppe Guarneri of Cremona. Bartolomeo Cristofori invented the piano.

Italian literature and literary language began with Dante Alighieri, author of Divine Comedy. Literary achievements—such as the poetry of Petrarch, Torquato Tasso, and Ludovico Ariosto, and the prose of Giovanni Boccaccio, Niccolò Machiavelli, and Baldassare Castiglione—exerted a huge and lasting influence on the subsequent development of Western culture. Outstanding film directors are Federico Fellini, Sergio Leone, Pier Paolo Pasolini, Luchino Visconti, Vittorio De Sica, Michelangelo Antonioni, Roberto Rossellini, Paolo Sorrentino, Franco Zeffirelli, Bernardo Bertolucci, Lina Wertmüller, and Italian-born Frank Capra. Famous film stars include Italian-born Rudolph Valentino, Marcello Mastroianni, Gina Lollobrigida, and Sophia Loren.

In philosophy, exploration, and statesmanship, Italy has produced many world-renowned figures: the traveler Marco Polo; the statesman and patron of the arts Cosimo de' Medici; the statesman, clergyman, and artistic patron Rodrigo Borgia, who became Pope Alexander VI; the soldier, statesman, and artistic patron Lorenzo de' Medici, the son of Cosimo; the explorer John Cabot; the explorer Christopher Columbus; the explorer Amerigo Vespucci, after whom the Americas are named; the admiral and statesman Andrea Doria; Caterina de medici, queen of France; Niccolò Machiavelli, author of The Prince and the outstanding political theorist of the Renaissance; the statesman and clergyman Cesare Borgia, the son of Rodrigo; the explorer Sebastian Cabot, the son of John; the historian Francesco Guicciardini; the explorer Giovanni da Verrazzano; the explorer Pietro Savorgnan di Brazzà, who gave his name to the city of Brazzaville, capital of the Republic of Congo; the philosopher Bernardino Telesio; the explorer, missionary, and sinologist Matteo Ricci; the mathematician, astronomer, and philosopher Giordano Bruno; the scholar Paolo Sarpi, so well versed in many fields of human knowledge to be called the "Oracle of the century"; the philosopher Tommaso Campanella; the Cardinal Mazarin, a statesman, diplomat, and prime minister of France under Louis XIV; the imperial field marshal and statesman Prince Eugene of Savoy; the political philosopher Giambattista Vico; the noted jurist Cesare Beccaria; Giuseppe Mazzini, the leading spirit of the Risorgimento; Camillo Benso, Count of Cavour, its prime statesman; and Giuseppe Garibaldi, its foremost soldier and man of action.

The French military and political leader Napoleon was of Italian family and was born in the same year that the Republic of Genoa (former Italian state) ceded the region of Corsica to France.

Notable intellectual and political leaders of more recent times include the Nobel Peace Prize winner in 1907, Ernesto Teodoro Moneta; the sociologist and economist Vilfredo Pareto; the political theorist Gaetano Mosca; the educator Maria Montessori; the philosopher, critic, and historian Benedetto Croce, with his idealistic antagonist Giovanni Gentile; Benito Mussolini, the founder of Fascism and dictator of Italy from 1922 to 1943; Carlo Sforza, Alcide De Gasperi, and Giulio Andreotti, famous latter-day statesmen; and the Communist leaders Antonio Gramsci, Palmiro Togliatti, and Enrico Berlinguer.

Princess Marie-José was one of the very few diplomatic channels between the German/Italian camp and the other European countries involved in the war; she sympathised with the partisans and, while she was a refugee in Switzerland, smuggled weapons, money, and food for them. Virginia Oldoini, mistress of Emperor Napoleon III of France, was a significant figure in the early history of photography.

Italian scientists and mathematicians of note include Galileo Galilei, Fibonacci, Guglielmo Marconi, Antonio Meucci, Italian-American Enrico Fermi, Gerolamo Cardano, Bonaventura Cavalieri, Evangelista Torricelli, Francesco Maria Grimaldi, Marcello Malpighi, Giuseppe Luigi Lagrangia, Luigi Galvani, Alessandro Volta, Amedeo Avogadro, Stanislao Cannizzaro, Giuseppe Peano, Angelo Secchi, Camillo Golgi, Ettore Majorana, Emilio Segrè, Tullio Levi-Civita, Gregorio Ricci-Curbastro, Daniel Bovet, Giulio Natta, Rita Levi-Montalcini, Italian-American Riccardo Giacconi, and Giorgio Parisi. Elena Cornaro Piscopia was the first female Ph.D. graduate in the world history.

== Languages ==
Linguistic map of the Italian language throughout the world Official language Secondary, widely spoken or understood Understood by some due to former colonisation

The Romantic English poet Lord Byron described the Italian language as «that soft bastard Latin, which melts like kisses from a female mouth, and sounds as if it should be writ on satin». Byron's description is not an isolated expression of poetic fancy but, in fact, a popular view of the Italian language across the world, often called the language of "love", "poetry", and "song".

Italian evolved from a dialect spoken in Tuscany, which is the birthplace of writers such as Dante, Boccaccio, and Petrarch. Thanks to its cultural prestige, this dialect was progressively adopted by the Italian states and then, upon their unification in 1861, by the Kingdom of Italy. It may be considered somewhat intermediate, linguistically and geographically, between the Italo-Dalmatian languages of the centre-south and the Gallo-Italic languages of the north, becoming the centre of a dialect continuum. Its development was also influenced by the other Italian languages and by the Germanic language of post-Roman invaders.

There are only a few communities in Italy in which Italian is not spoken as the first language, but many speakers are native bilinguals of both Italian and Italy's regional languages, which historically predate today's national language. These include native communities of non-Romance and Indo-European languages such as Albanian, Croatian, and Greek in southern Italy, Slovene and German varieties in northern Italy, as well as dozens of various Romance languages, such as Arpitan, Catalan, Friulan, Ladin, Lombard, Neapolitan, Occitan, Sardinian, Sicilian, and many others.

Italian is often natively spoken in a regional variety, not to be confused with Italy's regional and minority languages; however, the establishment of a national education system led to a decrease in variation in the languages spoken across the country during the 20th century. Standardisation was further expanded in the 1950s and 1960s due to economic growth and the rise of mass media and television (the state broadcaster RAI helped set a standard Italian).

== Libraries and museums ==
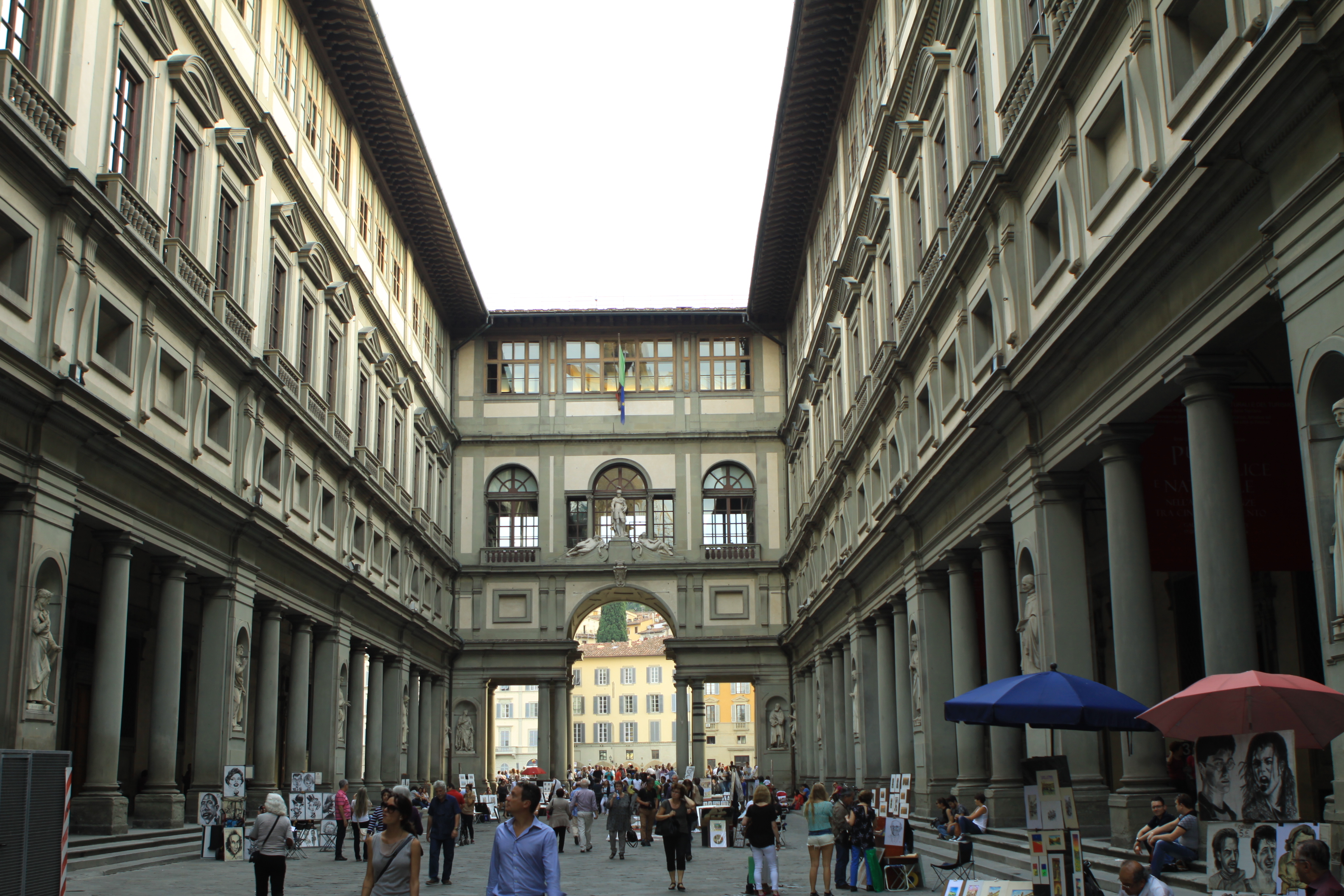
The Uffizi in Florence

Italy is one of the world's greatest centres of architecture, art, and books. Among its many libraries, the most important are in the national library system, which contains two central libraries, in Florence (5.3 million volumes) and Rome (5 million), and four regional libraries, in Naples (1.8 million volumes), Milan (1 million), Turin (973,000), and Venice (917,000). The existence of two national central libraries, while most nations have one, came about through the history of the country, as Rome was once part of the Papal States and Florence was one of the first capitals of the unified Kingdom of Italy. While both libraries are designated as copyright libraries, Florence now serves as the site designated for the conservation and cataloguing of Italian publications and the site in Rome catalogues foreign publications acquired by the state libraries.

== Media ==
=== Internet ===
In 1986, the first internet connection in Italy was experimented in Pisa, the third in Europe after Norway and the United Kingdom. Already in the late 1970s, Pisan researchers, firstly with Luciano Lenzini, were in contact with U.S. researchers who had written the history of the Internet. Among them were Vint Cerf and Bob Kahn, who were the first to invent TCP and IP, the two protocols at the heart of the internet, and are hence considered the "Fathers of the Internet".

Currently, Internet access is available to businesses and home users in various forms, including dial-up, cable, DSL, and wireless. The .it is the Internet country code top-level domain (ccTLD) for Italy. The .eu domain is also used, as it is shared with other European Union member states.

According to data released by the fibre-to-the-home (FTTH) Council Europe, Italy represents one of the largest FTTH markets in Europe, with more than 2,5 million homes passed by fibre at end-December 2010; at the same date the country reported around 348,000 fibre subscribers. The "Fibre for Italy" project (with the participation of providers Fastweb, Vodafone, and Wind in a co-investment partnership) aims to reach 20 million people in Italy's 15 largest cities by 2015, and Telecom Italia plans to connect 138 cities by 2018. The government has also started the Italia Digitale project, which aims to provide at least 50% of Italians with high-speed internet access by 2020. The government aims to extend the fibre-optic network to rural areas.

Figures published by the National Institute of Statistics showed at end-2011 that 58,8% of Italian families had a personal computer (up slightly from 57,6% in 2010); 54,5% had access to the internet (up from 52,4%); and 45,8% had broadband access (up from 43,4%). Over one-fourth (26,3%, down slightly from 26,4% in 2010) of Italian internet users aged 14 and older made an online purchase during 2011.

=== Newspapers and periodicals ===
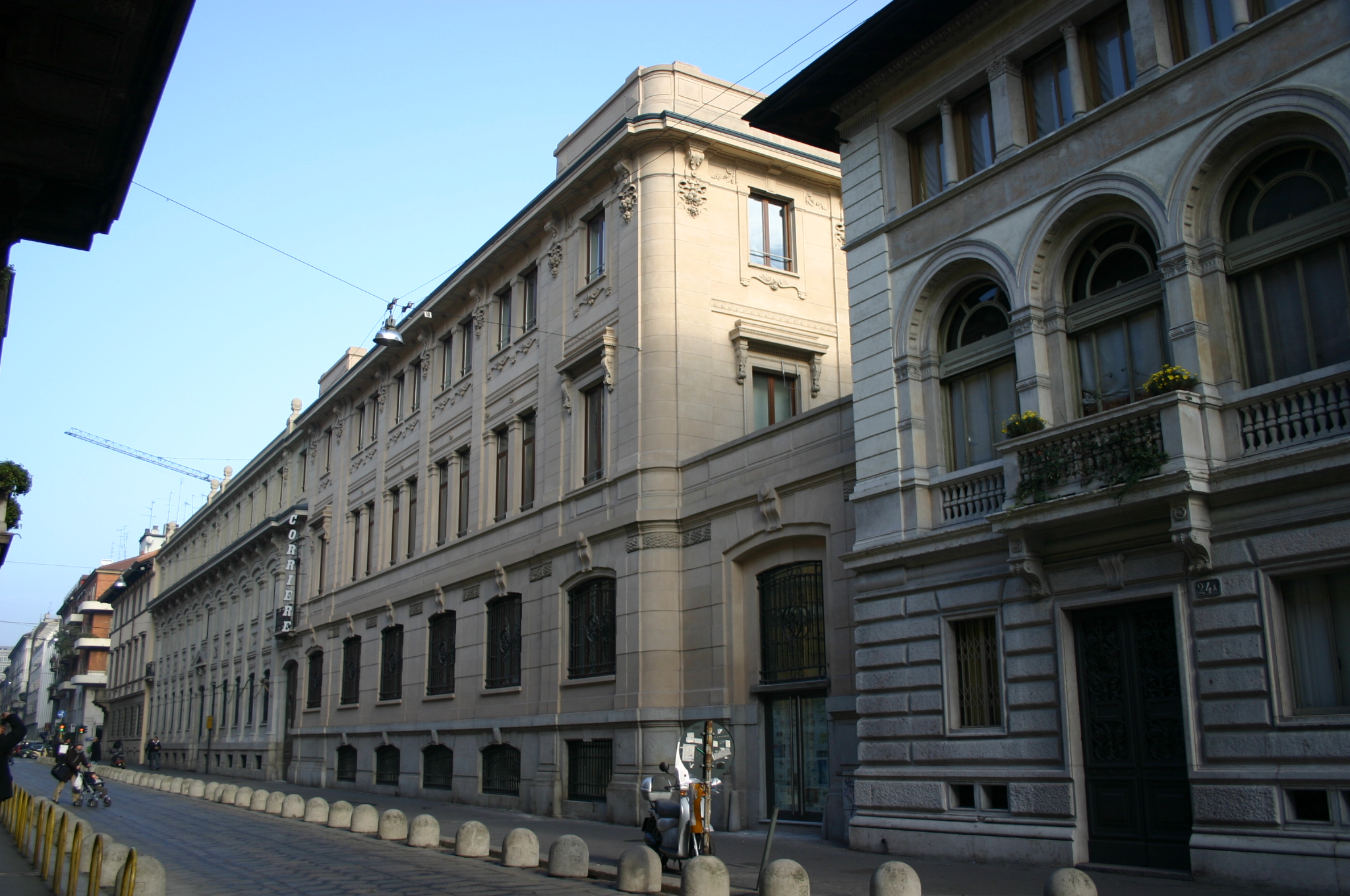
The historic seat of the Corriere della Sera in via Solferino in Milan

As of 2002, there were about 90 daily newspapers in the country, but not all of them had national circulation. According to Audipress statistics, the major daily newspapers (with their political orientations and estimated circulations) are: la Repubblica, left-wing, 3,276,000 in 2011; Corriere della Sera, independent, 3,274,000 in 2011; La Stampa, liberal, 2,132,000 in 2011; Il Messaggero, left of centre, 1,567,000 in 2011; il Resto del Carlino, right of centre, 1,296,000 in 2011; Il Sole 24 Ore, a financial news paper, 1,015,000 in 2011; il Giornale, independent, 728,000 in 2011; and l'Unità, Communist, 291,000 in 2011. TV Sorrisi e Canzoni is the most popular news weekly with a circulation of 677,658 in July 2012. The periodical press is becoming increasingly important. Among the most important periodicals are the pictorial weeklies—Oggi, L'Europeo, L'Espresso, and Gente. Famiglia Cristiana is a Catholic weekly periodical with a wide readership.

The majority of papers are published in northern and central Italy, and circulation is highest in these areas. Rome and Milan are the most important publication centres. A considerable number of dailies are owned by political parties, the Roman Catholic Church, and various economic groups.

The law provides for freedom of speech and the press, and the government is said to respect these rights in practice.

=== Radio ===
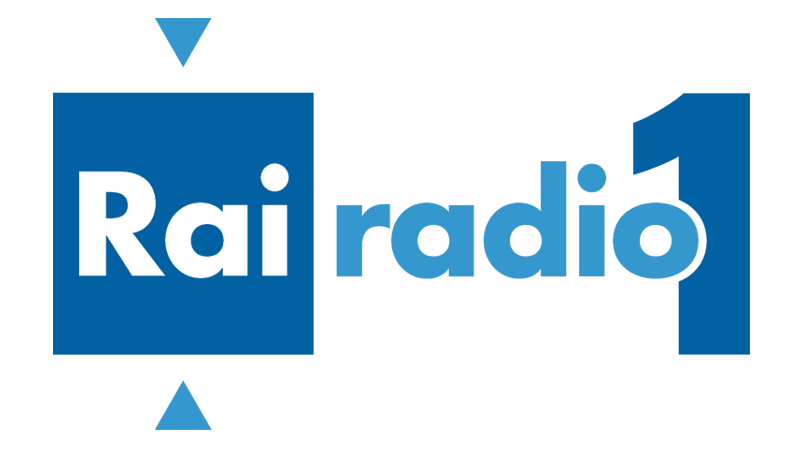
Rai Radio 1

Of all the claimants to the title of the "Father of Radio", the one most associated with it is the Italian inventor Guglielmo Marconi. He was the first person to send radio communication signals in 1895. By 1899 he flashed the first wireless signal across the English Channel and two years later received the letter "S", telegraphed from England to Newfoundland. This was the first successful transatlantic radiotelegraph message in 1902.

Today, radio waves that are broadcast from thousands of stations, along with waves from other sources, fill the air around us continuously. Italy has three state-controlled radio networks that broadcast day and evening hours on both AM and FM. (Note: Rai Radio 1, Rai Radio 2, and Rai Radio 3.) Program content varies from popular music to lectures, panel discussions, as well as frequent newscasts and feature reports. In addition, many private radio stations mix popular and classical music. A short-wave radio, although unnecessary, aids in the reception of VOA, BBC, Vatican Radio in English and the Armed Forces Network in Germany and in other European stations.

=== Television ===
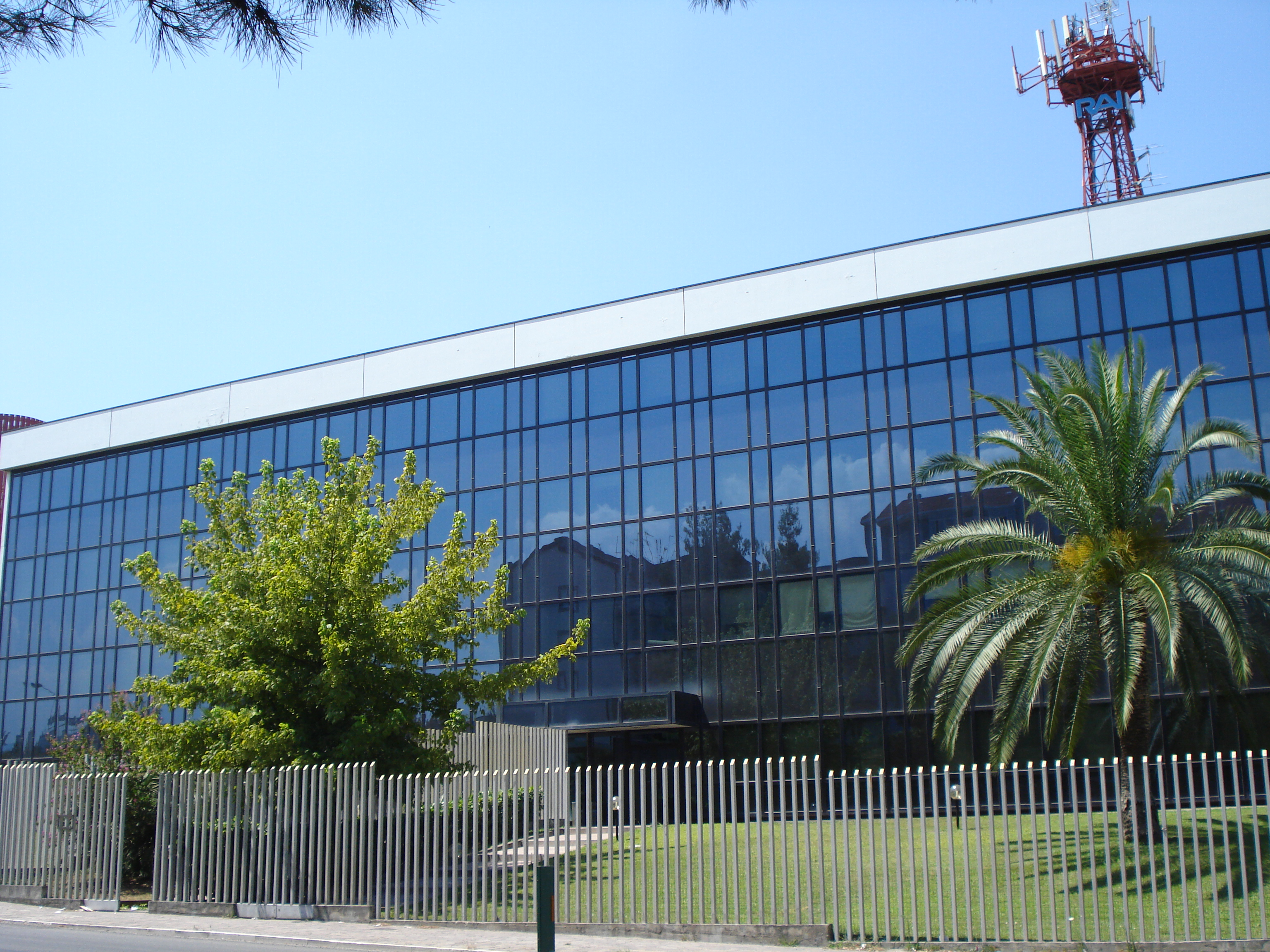
Regional seat of RAI in Cosenza

The first form of televised media in Italy was introduced in 1939, when the first experimental broadcasting began. However, this lasted for a very short time: when fascist Italy entered World War II in 1940, all the transmissions were interrupted, and were resumed in earnest only nine years after the end of the conflict, in 1954.

There are two main national television organisations responsible for most viewing: state-owned RAI, funded by a yearly mandatory licence fee and Mediaset, a commercial network founded by Silvio Berlusconi. Currently La7 is considered the third major network in Italy, it is owned by Telecom Italia Media, the media branch of the telephone company Telecom Italia, which also owns 51% of MTV Italia. While many other networks are also present, both nationally and locally, RAI and Mediaset together, with their six traditional ex-analogue stations (Note: Rai 1, Rai 2, and Rai 3; Canale 5, Italia 1, and Rete 4.) plus a number of new free to air digital channels, reach almost 70% of the TV ratings.

The television networks offer varied programs, including news, soap operas, reality TV shows, dating shows, game shows, sitcoms, cartoons, and films-all in Italian. All programs are in colour, except for the old black-and-white films. Most Italians still depend on VHF/UHF reception, but both cable systems and direct satellite reception is increasingly common. Conventional satellite dishes can pick up European broadcasts, including some in English.

== National symbols ==
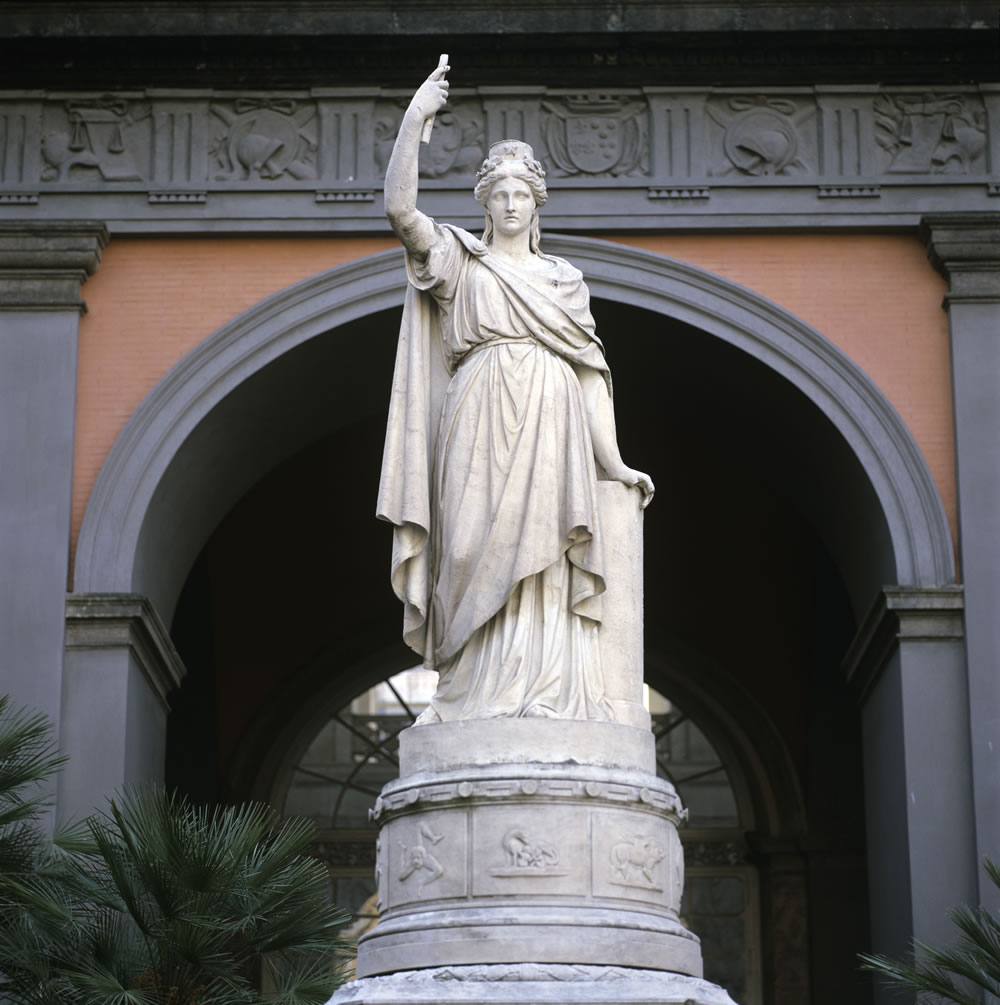
The statue of Italia turrita in Naples. Italia turrita is the national personification of Italy.

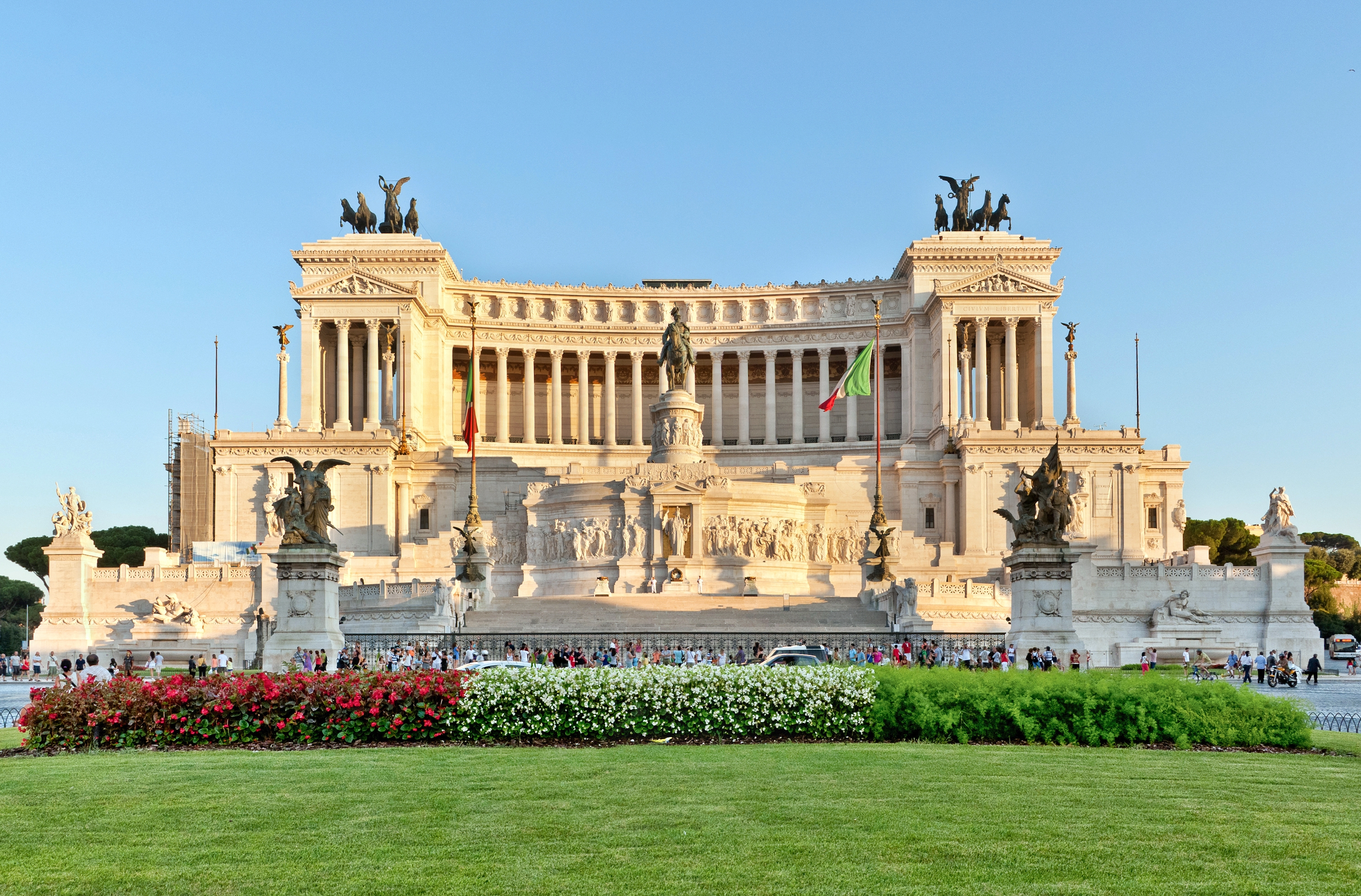
The Altare della Patria in Rome, a national symbol of Italy celebrating the first king of the unified country, and resting place of the Italian Unknown Soldier since the end of World War I. It was inaugurated in 1911, on the occasion of the 50th Anniversary of the Unification of Italy.

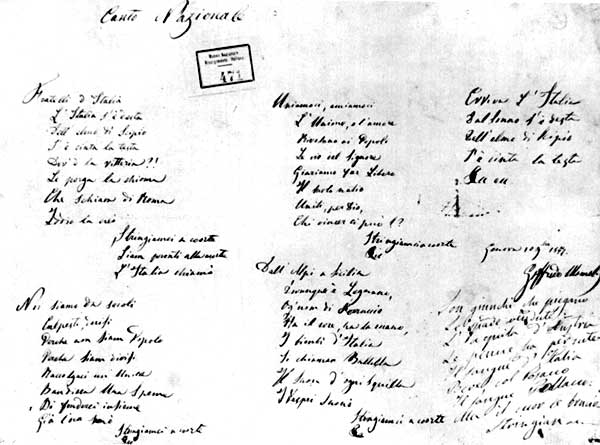
Holographic copy of 1847 of "Il Canto degli Italiani", the Italian national anthem since 1946

National symbols of Italy are the symbols that uniquely identify Italy reflecting its history and culture. They are used to represent the Nation through emblems, metaphors, personifications, and allegories, which are shared by the entire Italian people.

The three main official symbols, are:

- the flag of Italy, that is, the national flag in green, white and red, as required by article 12 of the Constitution of the Italian Republic;
- the emblem of Italy, which is the iconic symbol identifying the Italian Republic;
- The "Il Canto degli Italiani" by Goffredo Mameli and Michele Novaro, the Italian national anthem, which is performed in all public events.

Of these only the flag is explicitly mentioned in the Italian Constitution; this puts the flag under the protection of the law, with criminal penalties for contempt of it.

Other official symbols, as reported by the Presidency of the Italian Republic, are:

- the presidential standard of Italy, that is the distinctive standard representing the Presidency of the Italian Republic;
- the Altare della Patria, or the national monument dedicated to King Vittorio Emanuele II of Savoy, the first Sovereign of a united Italy and founder of the Fatherland, which houses the shrine of the Italian tomb of the Unknown Soldier.
- the Festa della Repubblica, which is the national celebratory day established to commemorate the birth of the Italian Republic, which is celebrated every year on 2 June, the date of the institutional referendum of 1946 with which the monarchy was abolished;

The teaching in the schools of the "Il Canto degli Italiani", an account of the Risorgimento events, and on the adoption of the flag of Italy are prescribed by law n. 222 of 23 November 2012.

There are also other symbols or emblems of Italy which, although not defined by law, are part of the Italian identity:

- the Italia turrita, which is the national personification of Italy in the appearance of a young woman with her head surrounded by a wall crown completed by towers (hence the term turrita);
- the cockade of Italy, or the national ornament of Italy, obtained by folding a green, white and red ribbon into plissé using the technique called plissage ("pleating");
- the Italian wolf, which inhabits Apennine Mountains and the Western Alps, features prominently in Latin and Italian cultures, such as in the legend of the founding of Rome. It is unofficially considered the national animal of Italy.
- the national colours of Italy are green, white, and red, collectively known in Italian as il tricolore (lit. 'the tricolour'). In sport in Italy, savoy azure has been used or adopted as the colour for many national teams, the first being the men's football team in 1910. The national auto racing colour of Italy is instead rosso corsa (lit. 'racing red'), while in other disciplines such as cycling and winter sports, which often use white.
- the strawberry tree, or the small tree chosen as a national tree because of its green leaves, its white flowers and its red berries, colours that recall the Italian flag; The flower of the strawberry tree is the national flower of Italy.
- the Italian sparrow, considered the national bird of Italy.
- the Stella d'Italia, the most ancient identity symbol of Italian land, since it dates back to Graeco-Roman tradition.
- the Frecce Tricolori, or the national aerobatic team of the Italian Air Force.

== Public holidays ==
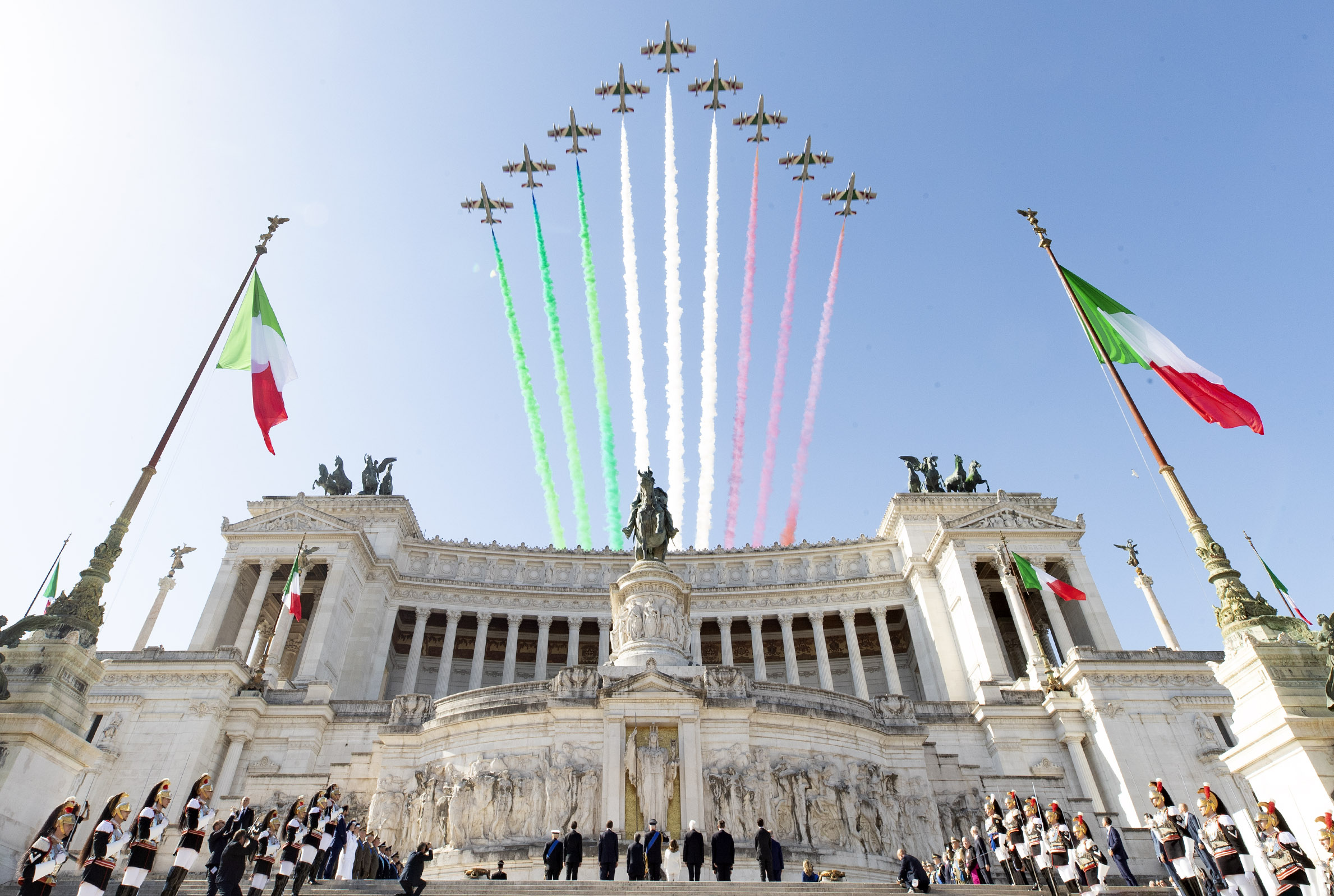
The Frecce Tricolori, with the smoke trail representing the national colours of Italy, above the Victor Emmanuel II Monument in Rome during the celebrations of the Festa della Repubblica on 2 June 2022

Public holidays celebrated in Italy include religious, national, and regional observances. Italy's National Day, the Festa della Repubblica ('Republic Day'), is celebrated on 2 June each year, with the main celebration taking place in Rome, and commemorates the birth of the Italian Republic in 1946. The ceremony of the event organised in Rome includes the deposition of a laurel wreath as a tribute to the Italian Unknown Soldier at the Altare della Patria by the president of the Italian Republic and a military parade along Via dei Fori Imperiali in Rome.

Liberation Day is a national holiday in Italy that commemorates the victory of the Italian resistance movement against Nazi Germany and the Italian Social Republic, puppet state of the Nazis and rump state of the fascists, in the Italian Civil War, a civil war in Italy fought during World War II, which takes place on 25 April. The date was chosen by convention, as it was the day of the year 1945 when the National Liberation Committee of Upper Italy (CLNAI) officially proclaimed the insurgency in a radio announcement, propounding the seizure of power by the CLNAI and proclaiming the death sentence for all fascist leaders (including Benito Mussolini, who was shot three days later).

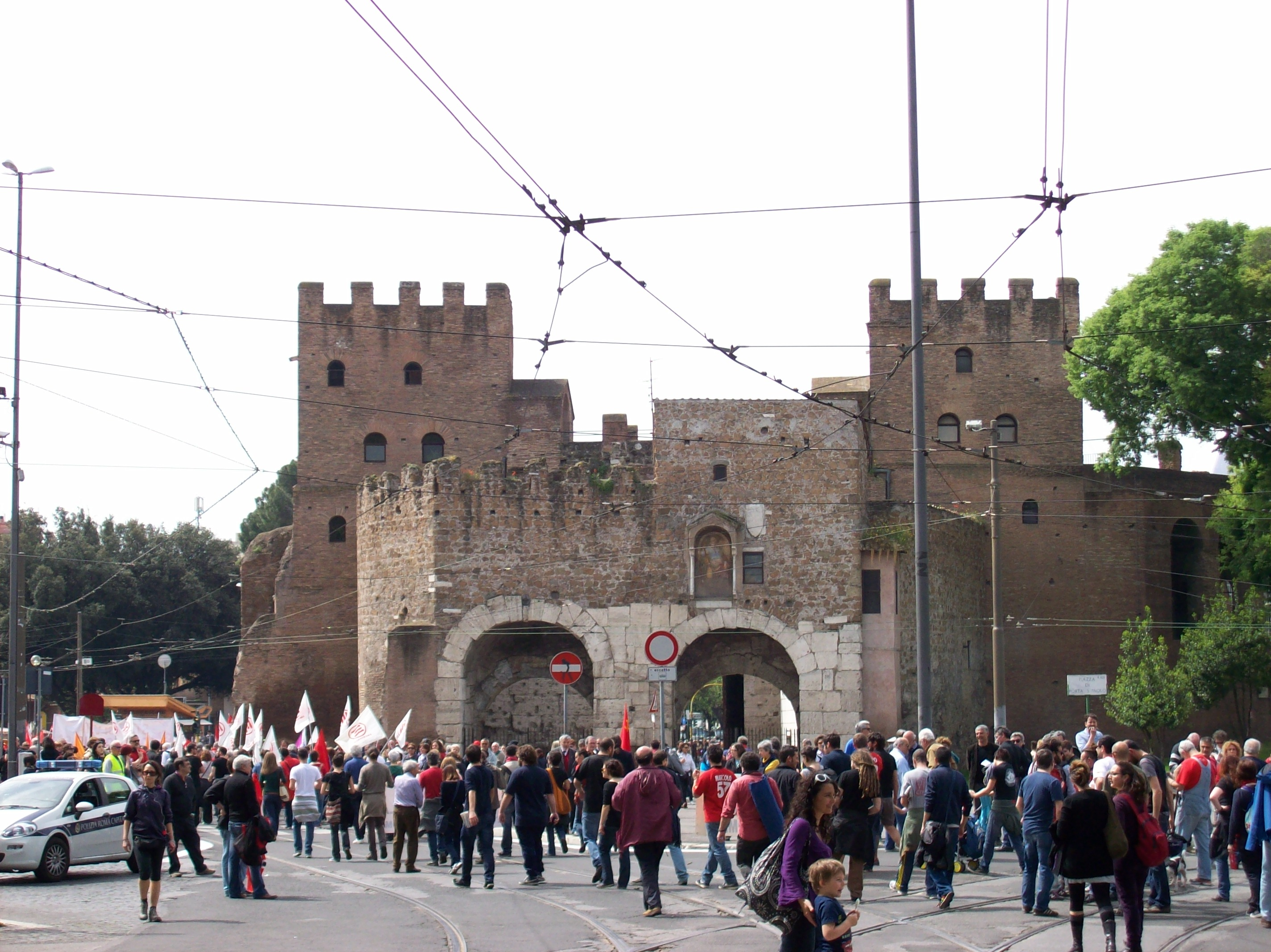
Anti-fascist demonstration at Porta San Paolo in Rome on the occasion of the Liberation Day on 25 April 2013

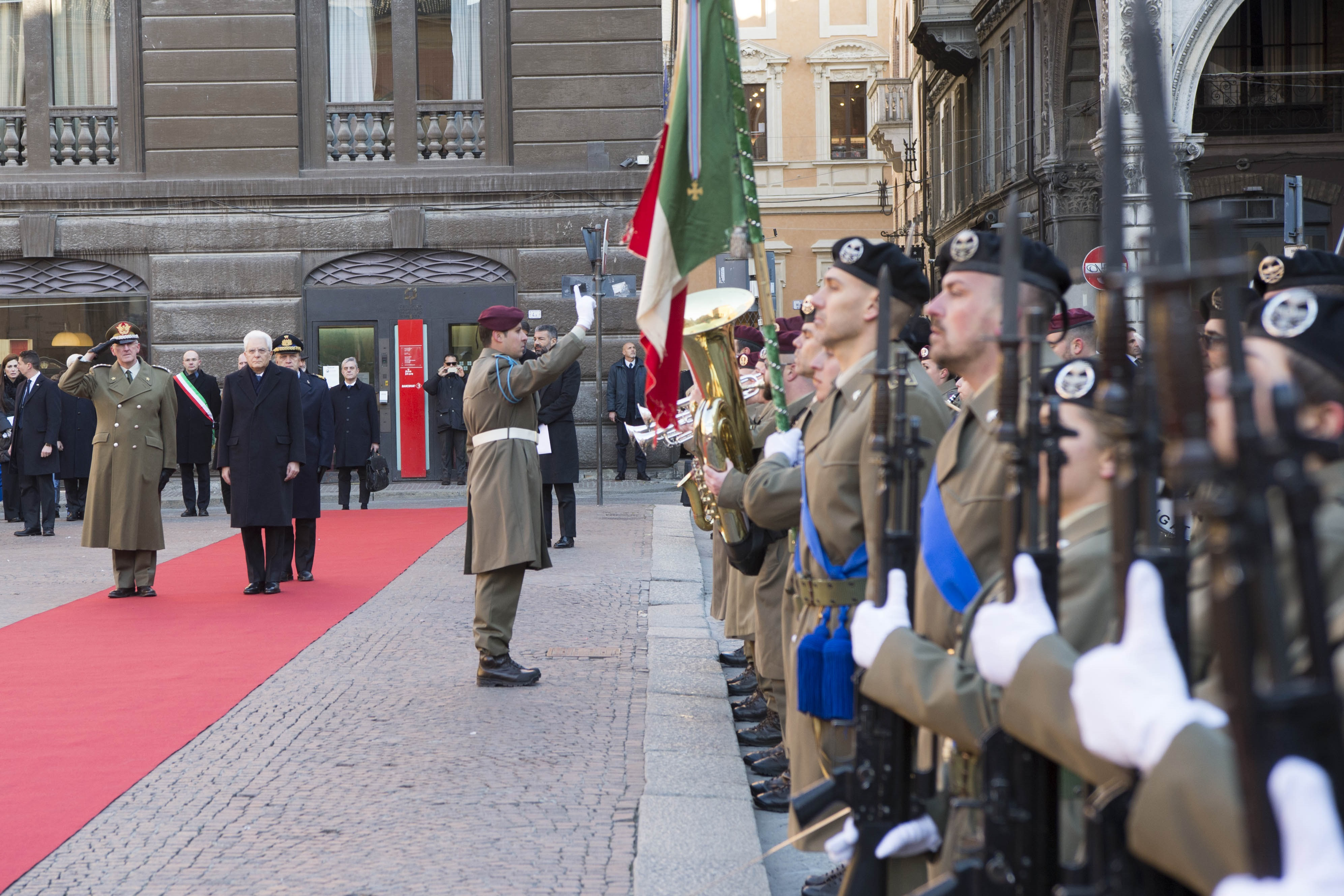
The president of Italy Sergio Mattarella during his entry into the Sala del Tricolore on the occasion of the Tricolour Day on 7 January 2017

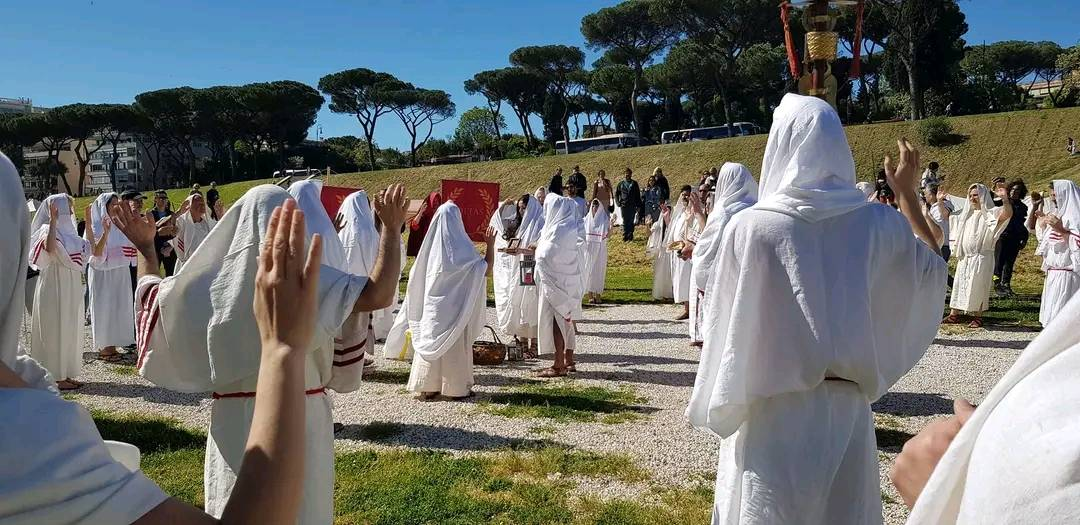
Celebration of the 2777th Natale di Roma at the Circus Maximus

National Unity and Armed Forces Day is an Italian national day since 1919 which commemorates the victory in World War I, a war event considered the completion of the process of unification of Italy. It is celebrated every 4 November, which is the anniversary of the armistice of Villa Giusti becoming effective in 1918, declaring Austria-Hungary's surrender. Italy entered the World War I in 1915 with the aim of completing national unity: for this reason, the Italian intervention in the World War I is also considered the Fourth Italian War of Independence, in a historiographical perspective that identifies in the latter the conclusion of the unification of Italy, whose military actions began during the revolutions of 1848 with the First Italian War of Independence. The Treaty of Saint-Germain-en-Laye (1919) and the Treaty of Rapallo (1920) allowed the annexation of Trentino Alto-Adige, Julian March, Istria, and Kvarner, as well as the Dalmatian city of Zara; the subsequent Treaty of Rome (1924) led to the annexation of the city of Fiume to Italy. (Note: Following the defeat of Italy in the World War II and the Paris Treaties of 1947, Istria, Kvarner, and most of Julian March, with the cities of Fiume and Zara, passed to Yugoslavia.)

The Anniversary of the Unification of Italy is a national day that falls annually on 17 March and celebrates the birth of Italy as modern nation state, which took place following the proclamation of the Kingdom of Italy on 17 March 1861; however, the complete unification of Italy took place only in the following years. In 1866, Veneto and the province of Mantua were annexed after the Third Italian War of Independence, then in 1870 Lazio after the capture of Rome, and finally in 1918 Trentino-Alto Adige and Julian March after the World War I. The anniversary of the birth of the Italian state was solemnly celebrated in 1911 (50 years), in 1961 (100 years), and in 2011 (150 years).

The Tricolour Day, officially National Flag Day, is the flag day of Italy. Celebrated on 7 January, it was established by Law 671 on 31 December 1996. It is intended as a celebration, although not a public holiday. The official celebration of the day is held in Reggio Emilia, the city where the Italian tricolour was first adopted by an Italian sovereign state, the Cispadane Republic, on 7 January 1797. In Rome, at the Quirinal Palace, the ceremonial foresees instead the change of the Guard of honour in solemn form with the deployment and the parade of the Corazzieri Regiment in gala uniform and the Fanfare of the Carabinieri Cavalry Regiment. This solemn rite is carried out only on three other occasions, during the celebrations of the Anniversary of the Unification of Italy (17 March), of the Festa della Repubblica (2 June), and of the National Unity and Armed Forces Day (4 November).

The National Memorial Day of the Exiles and Foibe is an Italian celebration for the memory of the victims of the Foibe and the Istrian–Dalmatian exodus, which led to the emigration of hundreds of thousands (between 230,000 and 350,000) of local ethnic Italians (Istrian Italians and Dalmatian Italians) from Yugoslavia after the end of the World War II. The Italian Law 92 of 30 March 2004 instituted a Day of Remembrance on 10 February to commemorate the victims of Foibe and the forced exodus of nearly the entire population of Italian origin living in Dalmatia and Julian March brought about by Yugoslavia. The law also instituted a special medal to be conferred on relatives of victims. The date of 10 February is the day on which the peace treaties of Paris were signed. These treaties transferred the previously Italian areas of Istria, Kvarner, the Dalmatian city of Zadar, and most of Julian March to Yugoslavia.

Natale di Roma, historically known as Dies Romana and also referred to as Romaia, is the festival linked to the foundation of Rome, celebrated on 21 April. According to legend, Romulus is said to have founded the city of Rome on 21 April, 753 BC. From this date, the Roman chronology derived its system, known by the Latin phrase Ab urbe condita, meaning 'from the founding of the city', which counted the years from this presumed foundation.

== Religion ==
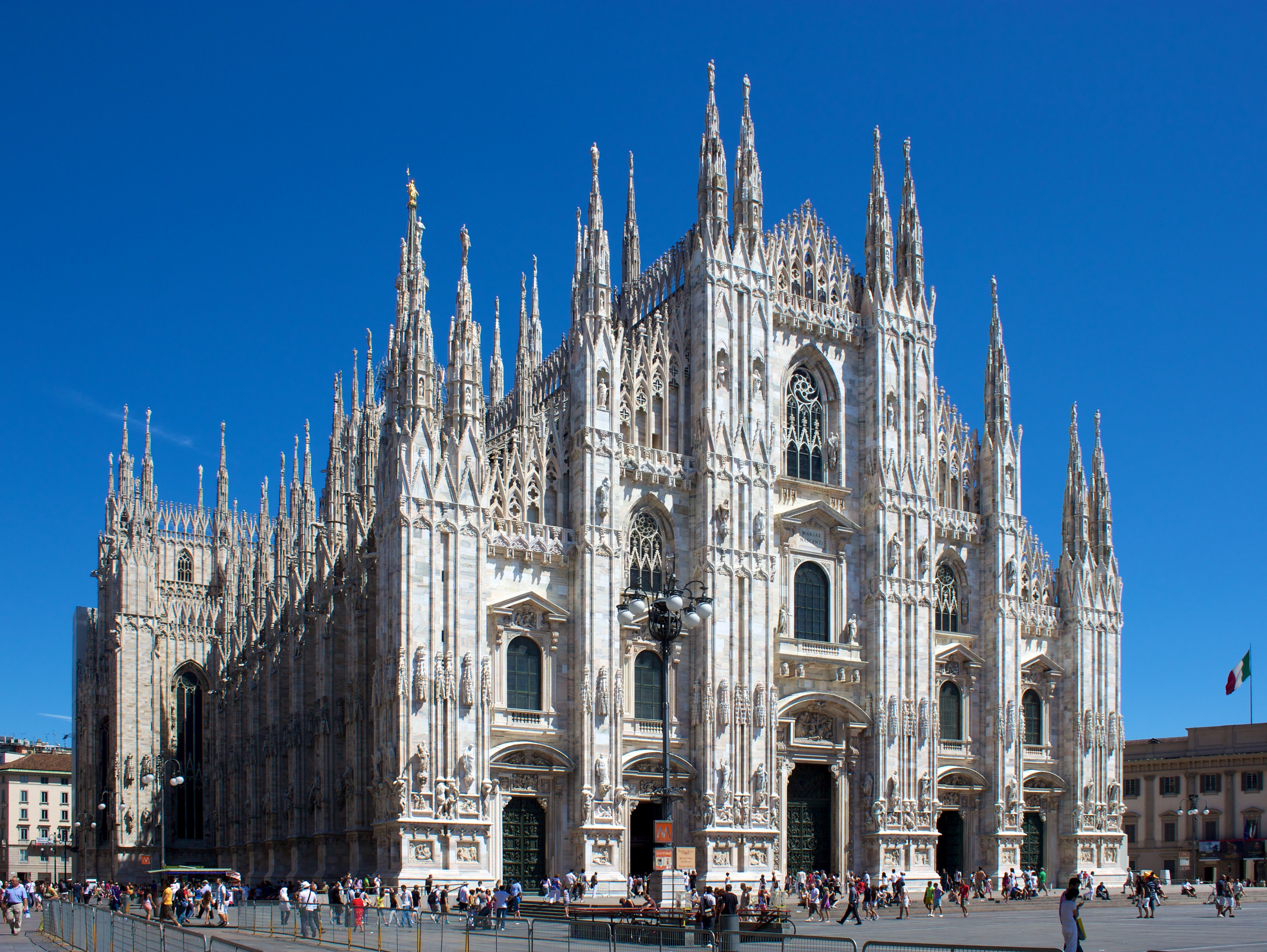
Milan Cathedral is the fourth-largest church in the world.

In 2017, the proportion of Italians who identified themselves as Roman Catholic Christians was 74.4%. Since 1985, Catholicism is no longer officially the state religion. Italy has the world's fifth-largest Catholic population, and is the largest Catholic nation in Europe.

The Holy See, the episcopal jurisdiction of Rome, contains the central government of the Catholic Church. It is recognised by other subjects of international law as a sovereign entity, headed by the pope, who is also the bishop of Rome, with which diplomatic relations can be maintained. (Note: The Holy See's sovereignty has been recognised explicitly in many international agreements and is particularly emphasised in article 2 of the Lateran Treaty of 11 February 1929, in which "Italy recognizes the sovereignty of the Holy See in international matters as an inherent attribute in conformity with its traditions and the requirements of its mission to the world" (Lateran Treaty, English translation).) Often incorrectly referred to as "the Vatican", the Holy See is not the same entity as the Vatican City State because the Holy See is the jurisdiction and administrative entity of the pope. The Vatican City came into existence only in 1929.

In 2011, minority Christian faiths in Italy included an estimated 1.5 million Orthodox Christians, or 2.5% of the population, 500,000 Pentecostals and Evangelicals (of whom 400,000 are members of the Assemblies of God), 251,192 Jehovah's Witnesses, 30,000 Waldensians, 25,000 Seventh-day Adventists, 26,925 Latter-day Saints, 15,000 Baptists (plus some 5,000 Free Baptists), 7,000 Lutherans, and 4,000 Methodists (affiliated with the Waldensian Church).

Florence Cathedral, which has the biggest brick dome in the world

One of the longest-established minority religious faiths in Italy is Judaism, Jews having been present in ancient Rome since before the birth of Christ. Italy has for centuries welcomed Jews expelled from other countries, notably Spain. However, about 20% of Italian Jews were killed during the Holocaust. This, together with the emigration which preceded and followed World War II, has left only around 28,400 Jews in Italy.

Soaring immigration in the last two decades has been accompanied by an increase in non-Christian faiths. Following immigration from the Indian subcontinent, in Italy there are 120,000 Hindus, 70,000 Sikhs, and 22 gurdwaras across the country.

The Italian state, as a measure to protect religious freedom, devolves shares of income tax to recognised religious communities, under a regime known as Eight per thousand. Donations are allowed to Christian, Jewish, Buddhist, and Hindu communities; however, Islam remains excluded, since no Muslim communities have yet signed a concordat with the Italian state. Taxpayers who do not wish to fund a religion contribute their share to the state welfare system.

The Italian Renaissance has had a seminal effect on church art in Italy, which includes works by Leonardo da Vinci, Michelangelo, Sandro Botticelli, Gian Lorenzo Bernini, Fra Carnevale, Tintoretto, Titian, Raphael, Giotto, and others. Italian church architecture is includes historical landmarks of Western culture, notably St. Peter's Basilica in Rome, Cathedral of St. Mark's in Venice, and Brunelleschi's Florence Cathedral, which includes the "Gates of Paradise" doors at the Baptistery by Lorenzo Ghiberti.

== Sports ==
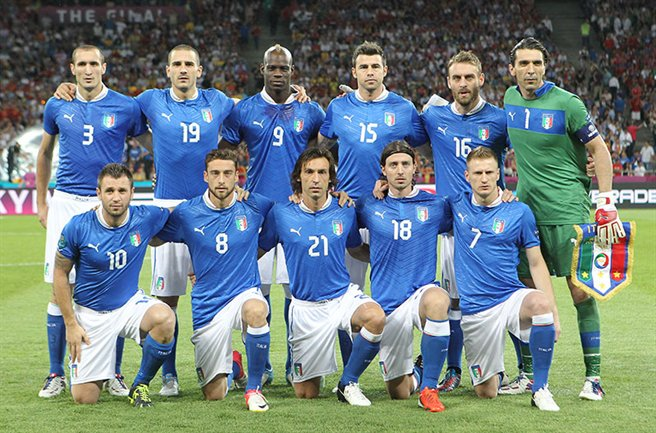
The Azzurri in 2012. Football is the most popular sport in Italy.

The most popular sport in Italy is football. Italy's men's national football team is one of the world's most successful teams, with four FIFA World Cup victories (1934, 1938, 1982, and 2006). Italian clubs have won 48 major European trophies, making Italy the second most successful country in European football. Italy's top-flight club football league is named Serie A and is followed by millions of fans around the world.

Other popular team sports in Italy include basketball, volleyball, and rugby. Italy's male and female national volleyball teams are often featured among the world's best. The Italian national basketball team's best results were gold at Eurobasket 1983 and EuroBasket 1999, as well as silver at the Olympics in 2004. Lega Basket Serie A is widely considered one of the most competitive in Europe. Italy's rugby national team competes in the Six Nations Championship, and is a regular at the Rugby World Cup. The men's volleyball team won three consecutive World Championships (in 1990, 1994, and 1998) and earned the Olympic silver medal in 1996, 2004, and 2016.

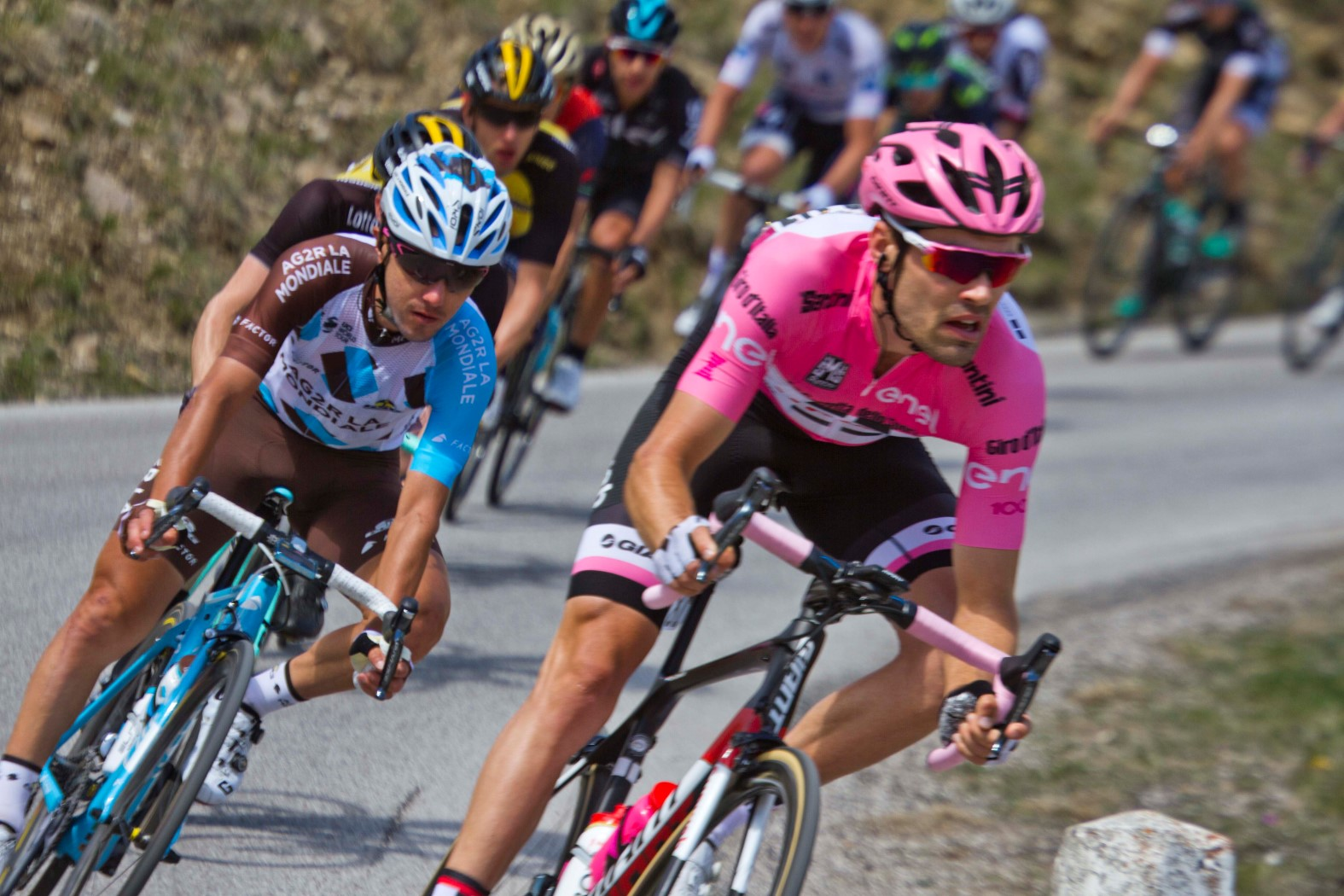
Starting in 1909, the Giro d'Italia is the Grands Tours' second oldest.

Italy has a long and successful tradition in individual sports as well. Bicycle racing is a familiar sport in the country. Italians have won the UCI World Championships more than any other country, except Belgium. The Giro d'Italia is a cycling race held every May, and constitutes one of the three Grand Tours. Alpine skiing is also a widespread sport in Italy, and the country is a popular international skiing destination, known for its ski resorts. Italian skiers achieved good results in Winter Olympic Games, Alpine Ski World Cup, and tennis has a significant following in Italy, ranking as the fourth most practised sport in the country. The Rome Masters, founded in 1930, is one of the most prestigious tennis tournaments in the world. Italian professional tennis players won the Davis Cup in 1976 and the Fed Cup in 2006, 2009, 2010, and 2013.

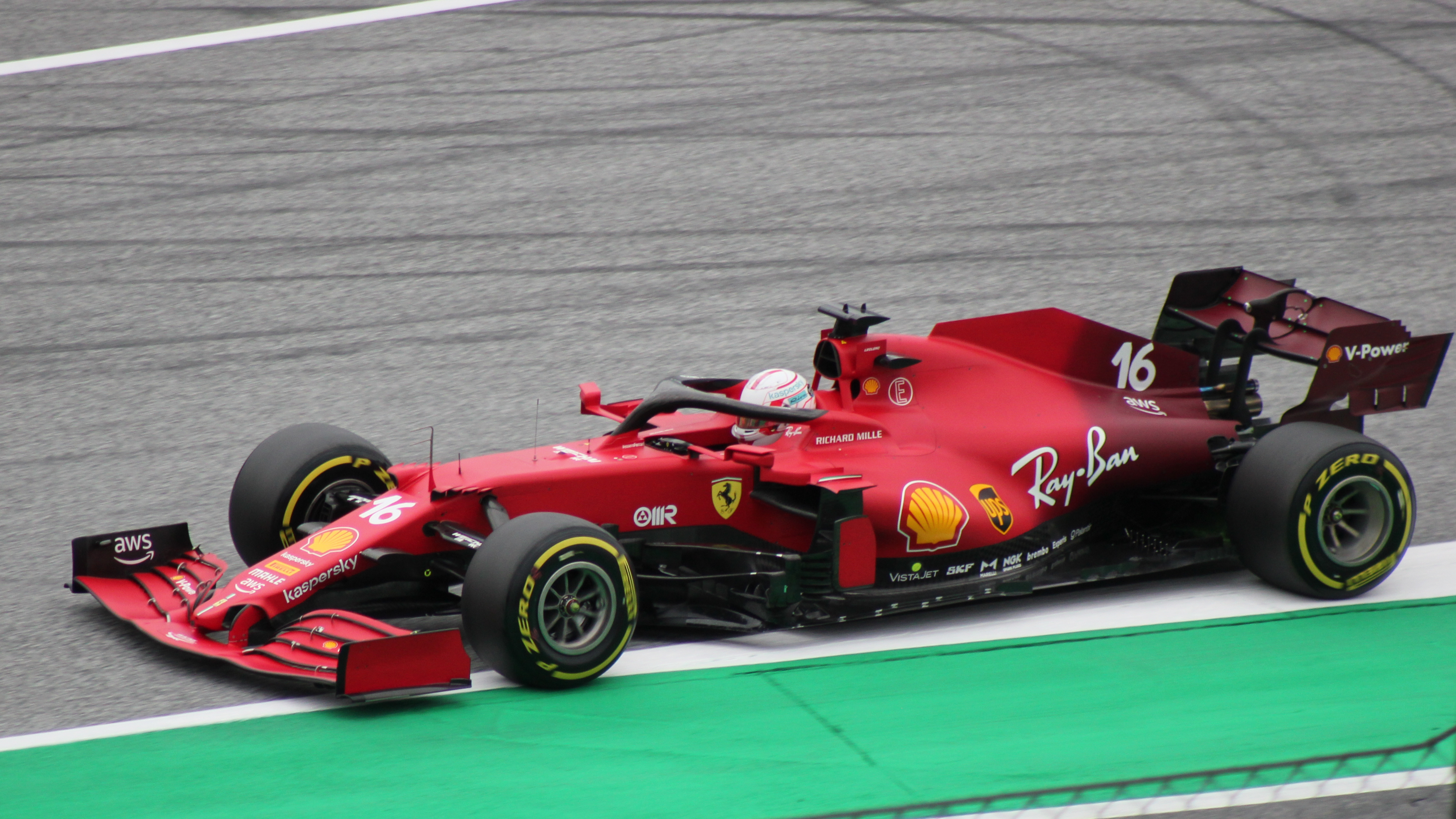
A Ferrari SF21 by Scuderia Ferrari, the most successful Formula One team

Motorsports are also extremely popular in Italy. Italy has won, by far, the most MotoGP World Championships. Italian Scuderia Ferrari is the oldest surviving team in Grand Prix racing, having competed since 1948, and statistically the most successful Formula One team in history with a record of 232 wins. The Italian Grand Prix of Formula 1 is the fifth oldest surviving Grand Prix, having been held since 1921. It is also one of the two Grand Prix present in every championship since the first one in 1950. Every Formula 1 Grand Prix (except for the 1980) has been held at Autodromo Nazionale Monza. Formula 1 was also held at Imola (1980–2006, 2020–2024) and Mugello (2020). Other successful Italian car manufacturers in motorsports are Alfa Romeo, Lancia, Maserati, and Fiat.

Historically, Italy has been successful in the Olympic Games, taking part from the first Olympiad and in 47 Games out of 48, not having officially participated in the 1904 Summer Olympics. Italian sportsmen have won 522 medals at the Summer Olympic Games, and another 106 at the Winter Olympic Games, for a combined total of 628 medals with 235 golds, which makes them the fifth most successful nation in Olympic history for total medals. The country hosted two Winter Olympics and will host a third (in 1956, 2006, and 2026), and one Summer games (in 1960).

== Traditions ==
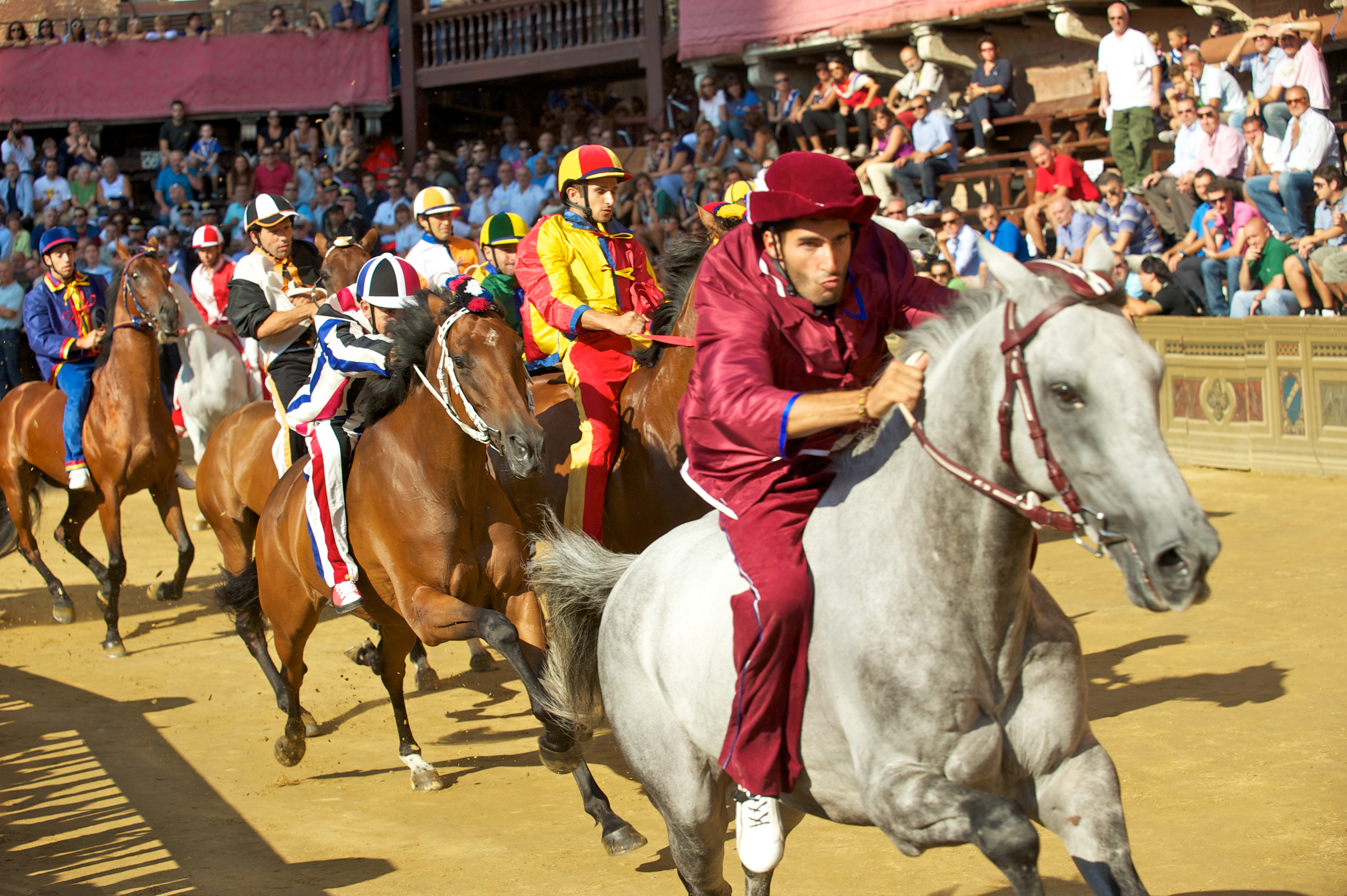
Palio di Siena

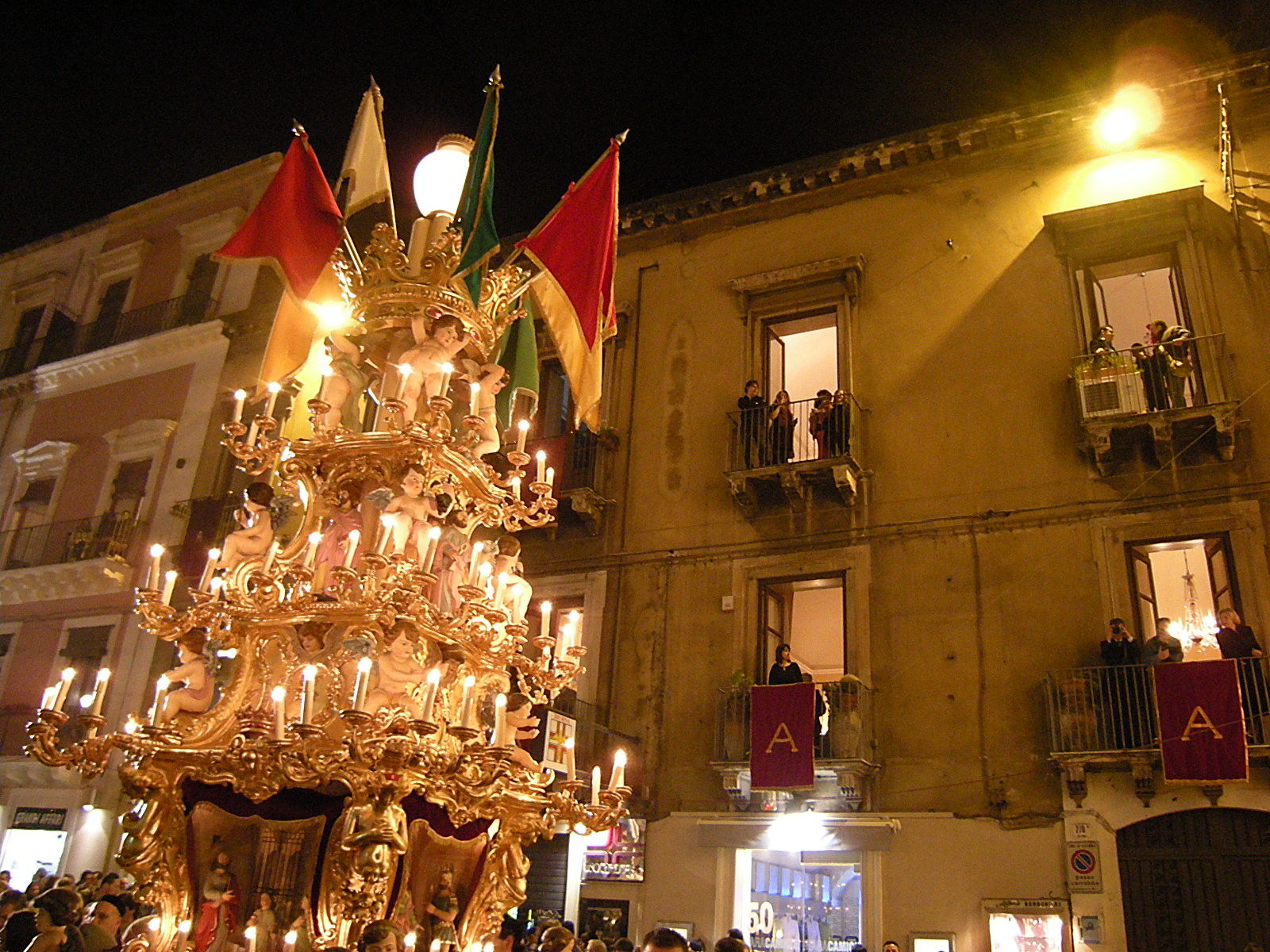
Festival of Saint Agatha

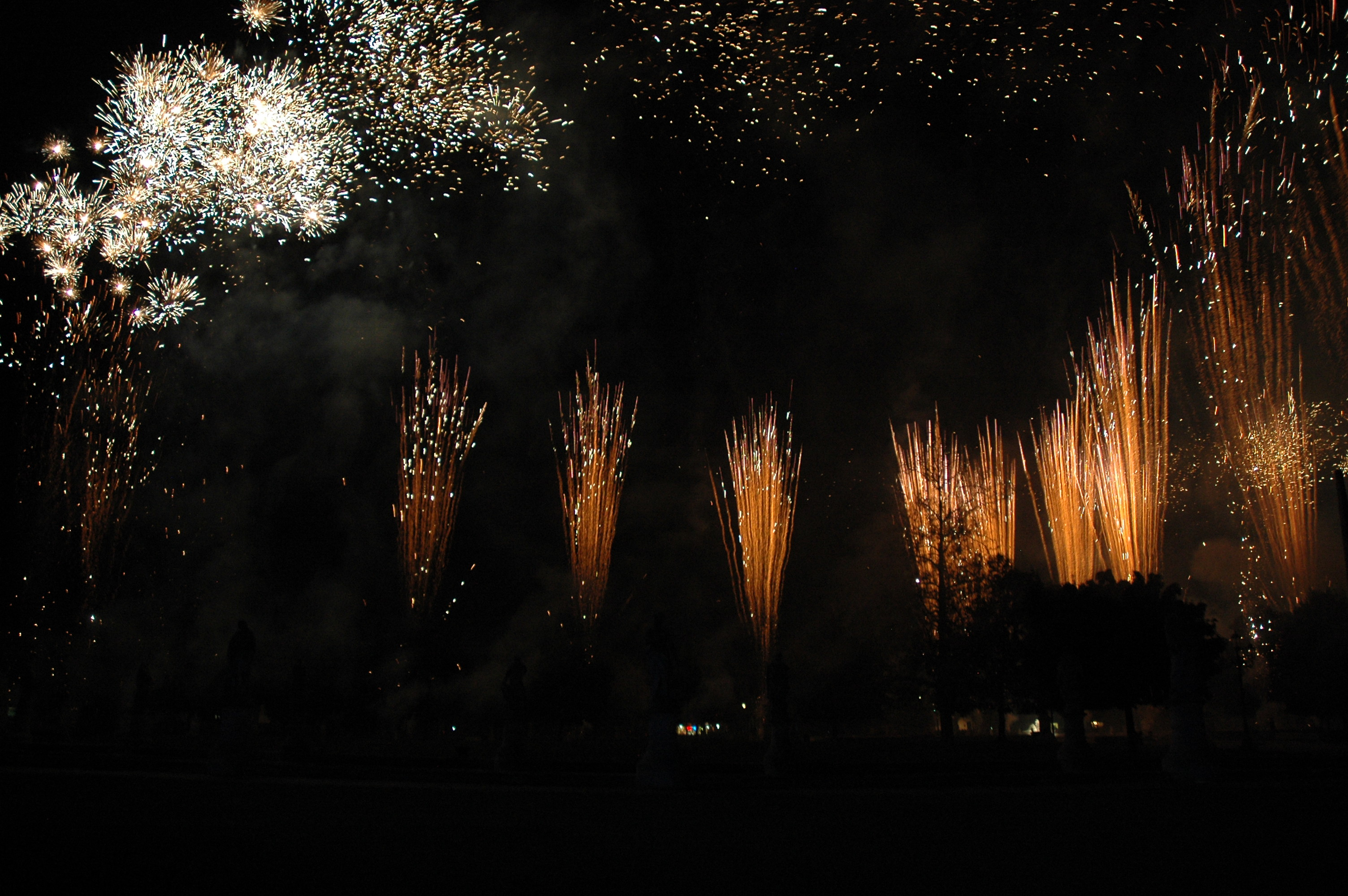
Ferragosto fireworks display in Padua on 15 August 2010

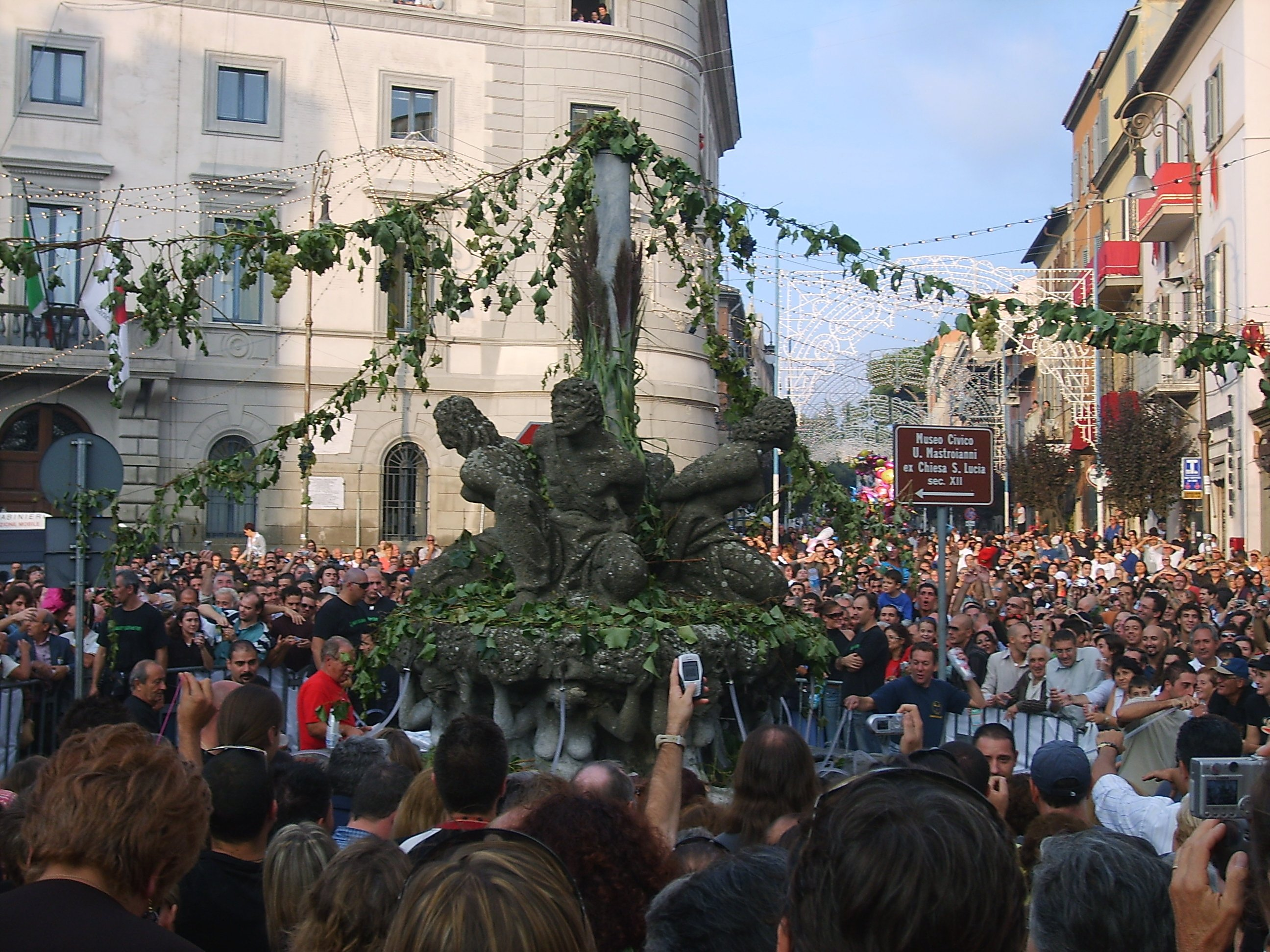
The Sagra dell'uva in Marino, Lazio, celebrating grapes

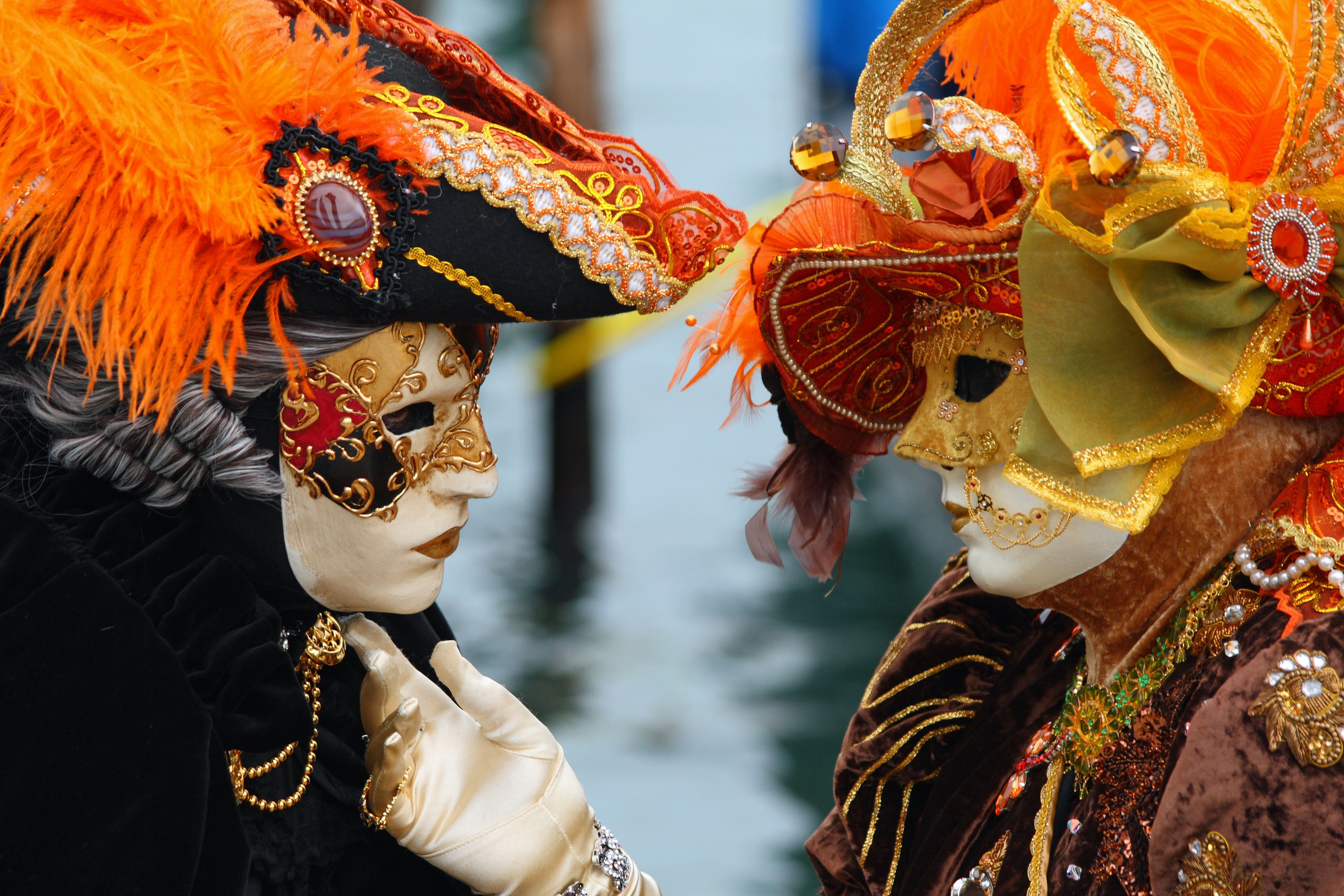
Carnival of Venice

Italian traditions reflect a rich cultural tapestry woven from religious, seasonal, and local celebrations that have evolved over centuries. These traditions blend ancient rituals, religious observances, and local customs, creating a vibrant cultural landscape that varies significantly across different regions of the country.

=== Religious and seasonal traditions ===
==== Christmas and Epiphany ====
Christmas in Italy is a major holiday beginning on 8 December with the Immaculate Conception and ending on 6 January with the Epiphany. The term Natale derives from Latin, with traditional greetings including buon Natale ('Merry Christmas') and felice Natale ('Happy Christmas').

The nativity scene tradition originates in Italy, attributed to Saint Francis of Assisi. His 1223 living nativity scene in Greccio is commemorated in Catholic, Lutheran, and Anglican liturgical calendars.

The Epiphany features the Befana, a folkloric figure who brings gifts to children, while Saint Lucy's Day (13 December) is celebrated in some regions as a children's holiday similar to Christmas.

==== New Year's traditions ====
New Year's Eve in Italy is marked by traditional rituals, including wearing red underwear and a rarely followed custom of discarding old items by dropping them from windows. Dinner is traditionally shared with family and friends, typically featuring zampone or cotechino with lentils. At 20:30, the president of Italy delivers a television greeting, and at midnight fireworks illuminate the country. A folklore tradition involves eating one spoonful of lentil stew per bell stroke, symbolising good fortune and prosperity.

=== Local festivals and cultural celebrations ===
==== Sagre: local food and cultural festivals ====
A sagra is a local festival typically celebrating regional cuisine or honouring a patron saint. These festivals often showcase specific local foods, such as the Sagra dell'uva in Marino or the Sagra della Cipolla in Cannara. Common sagre celebrate local products such as olive oil, wine, pasta, chestnuts, and cheese.

==== Patron saint days and regional festivals ====
The national patronal day on 4 October honours Saints Francis and Catherine. Each city also celebrates its patron saint's day, such as Rome (Saints Peter and Paul), Milan (Saint Ambrose), and Naples (Saint Januarius). Notable festivals include the Palio di Siena horse race, Holy Week rites, and the Festival of Saint Agatha.

In 2013, UNESCO recognised several Italian festivals as intangible cultural heritage, including the Varia di Palmi and the faradda di li candareri in Sassari. The unique calcio storico fiorentino, an early form of football originating in the Middle Ages, continues to be played annually in Florence.

=== Carnival traditions ===
Carnival traditions vary across Italy. In the Ambrosian rite regions around Milan, Carnival ends on the first Sunday of Lent. The Carnival of Venice and Carnival of Viareggio are particularly renowned, featuring sophisticated masquerades and parades. In Sardinia, a distinct carnival form survives, possibly rooted in pre-Christian winter rituals of awakening the earth.

=== Seasonal celebrations ===
Ferragosto on 15 August marks the peak of the summer vacation period, coinciding with the Assumption of Mary.

== UNESCO World Heritage Sites ==
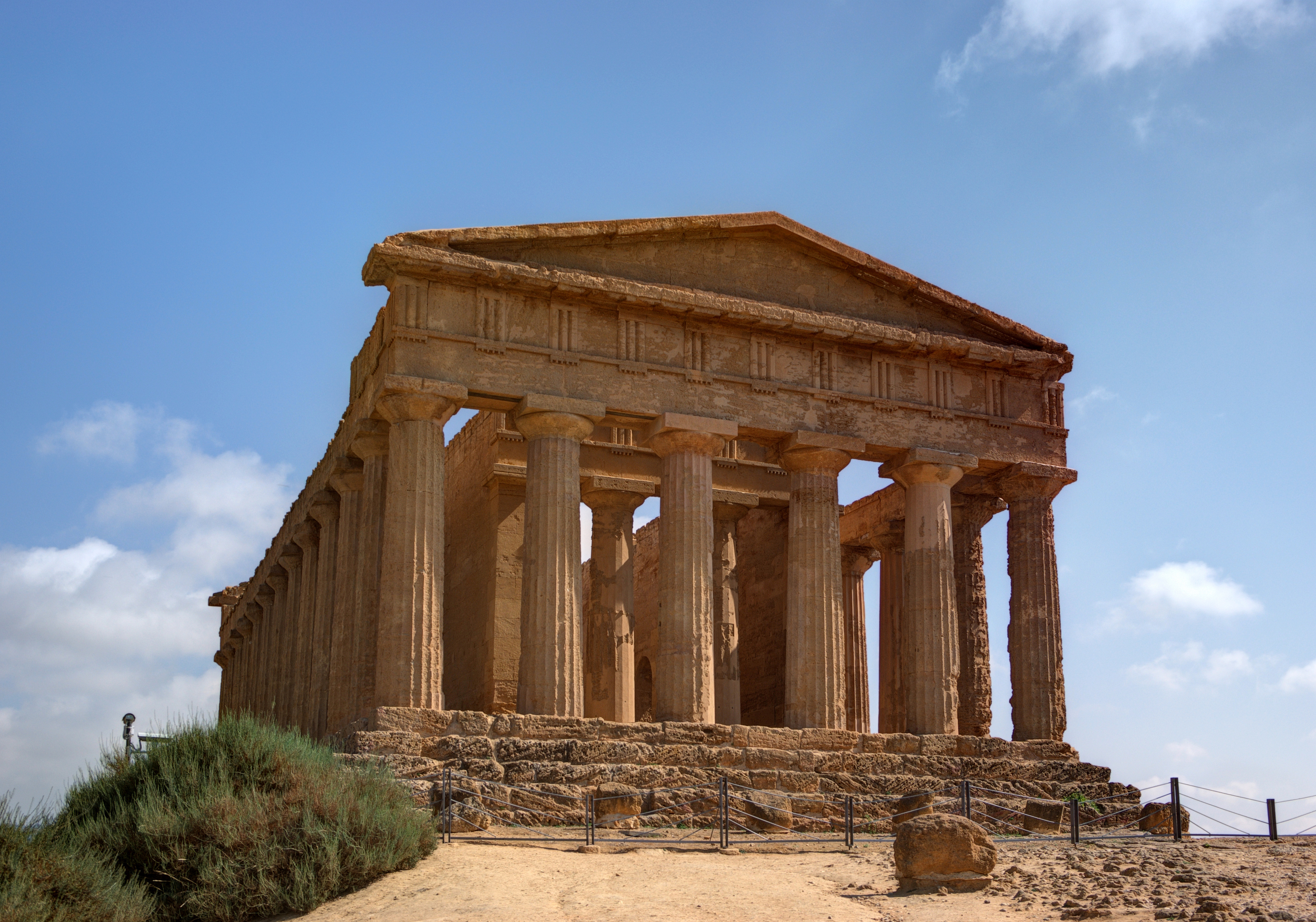
Valle dei Templi

The United Nations Educational, Scientific and Cultural Organization (UNESCO) World Heritage Sites are places of exceptional cultural or natural heritage as defined in the UNESCO World Heritage Convention of 1972. The convention defines cultural heritage as including monuments, architectural works, archaeological sites, and groups of buildings, while natural heritage encompasses geological formations, biological landscapes, and sites of scientific or conservation significance. Italy ratified the convention on 23 June 1978.

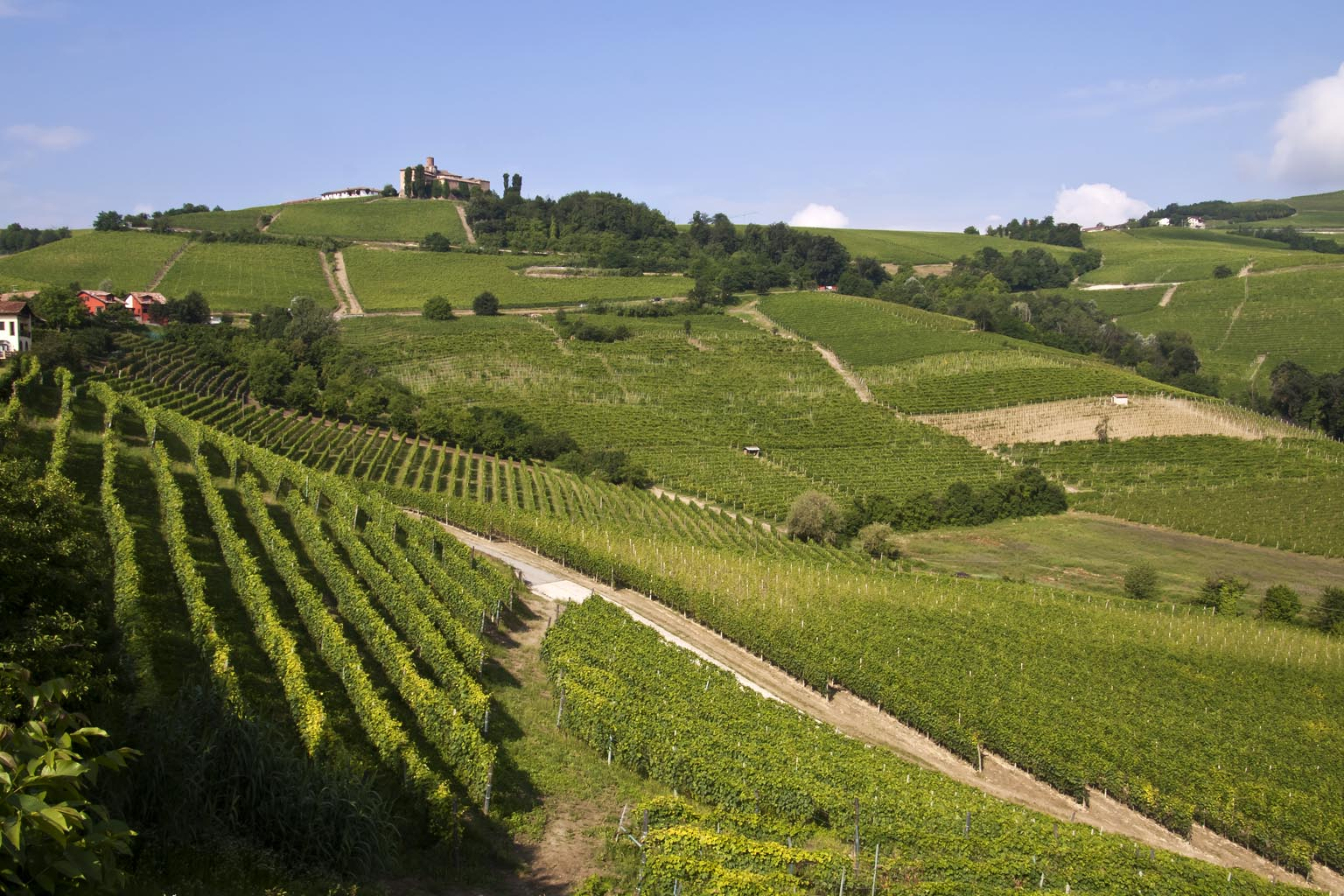
Vineyard Landscape of Piedmont: Langhe-Roero and Monferrato

The first Italian site, the Rock Drawings in Valcamonica, was listed during the World Heritage Committee's 3rd Session in Cairo and Luxor, Egypt, in 1979. Italy currently holds the world's highest concentration of UNESCO World Heritage Sites. As of 2026, Italy has 62 inscribed sites—the most of any country—with 56 cultural and 6 natural sites.

Notable Italian UNESCO World Heritage Sites include significant cultural and natural landmarks such as:

- Archaeological sites:
  - Sassi di Matera
  - Pompeii, Torre Annunziata, and Herculaneum
  - Etruscan necropolises of Cerveteri and Tarquinia
- Architectural marvels:
  - Valle dei Templi
  - Alberobello
  - Castel del Monte
  - Royal Palace of Caserta
  - Arab-Norman Palermo and the Cathedral Churches of Cefalù and Monreale
- Artistic treasures:
  - Santa Maria delle Grazie and The Last Supper
  - Scrovegni Chapel
- Natural landscapes:
  - Dolomites
  - Aeolian Islands
  - Amalfi Coast
  - Langhe-Roero and Montferrat
- Historic sites:
  - Cinque Terre
  - Syracuse and Necropolis of Pantalica
  - Val d'Orcia
  - Early Christian monuments of Ravenna

Seven sites are transnational. The Historic Centre of Rome is shared with the Vatican; Monte San Giorgio and the Rhaetian Railway with Switzerland; the Venetian Works of Defence with Croatia and Montenegro; the Prehistoric pile dwellings around the Alps with 5 other countries; the Great Spa Towns of Europe with 6 other countries; and the Ancient and Primeval Beech Forests of the Carpathians and Other Regions of Europe are shared with 17 other countries.

== See also ==
- Culture of Europe
