= Folklore of Italy =

Popular tales and legends from Italy

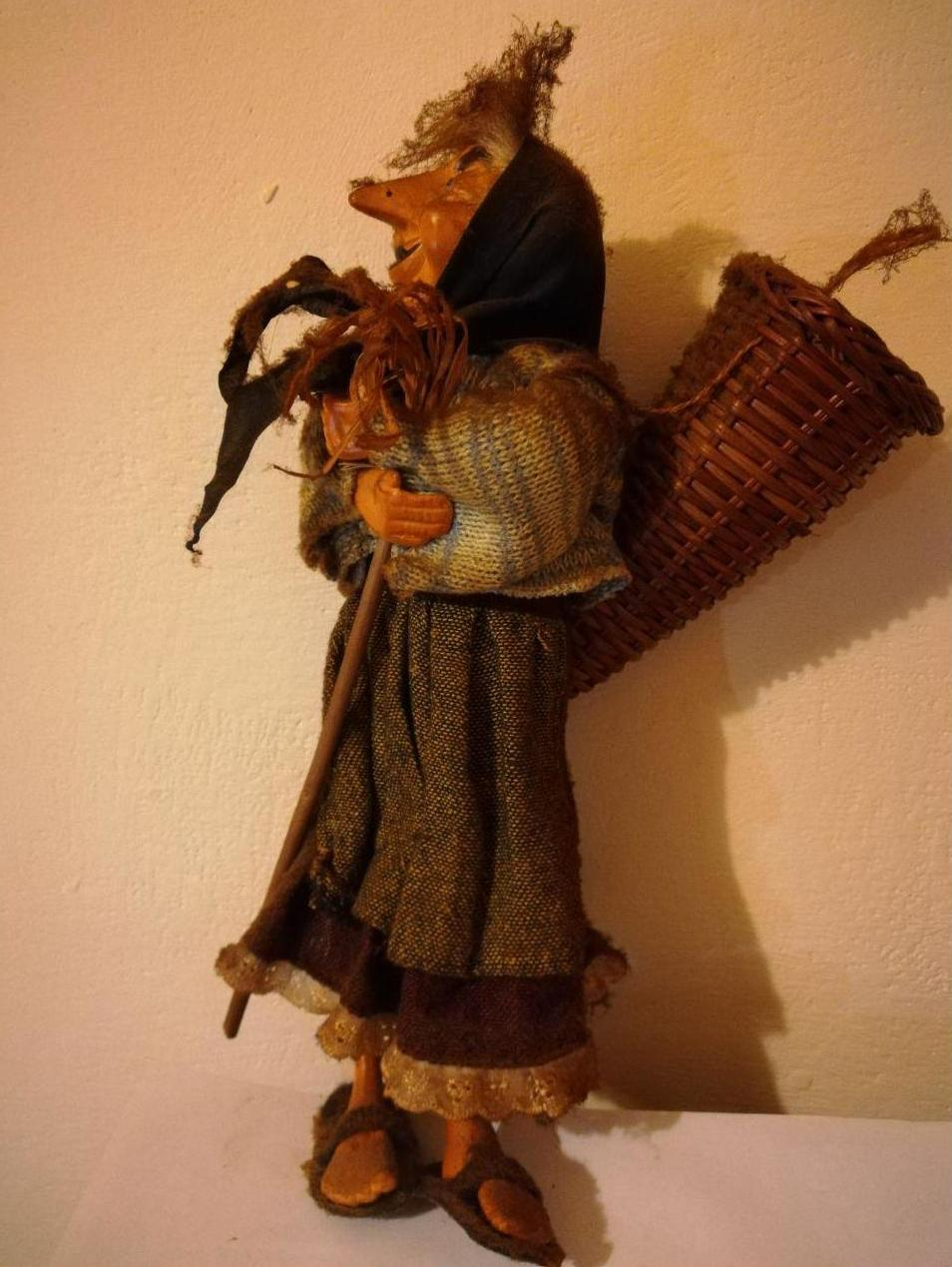
A wooden puppet depicting the Befana

Folklore of Italy refers to the folklore and urban legends of Italy. Within the Italian territory, various people have followed each other over time, each of which has left its mark on current culture. Some tales also come from Christianization, especially those concerning demons, which are sometimes recognized by Christian demonology. Italian folklore also includes the genre of the fairy tale (where the term itself was born), folk music, folk dance and folk heroes.

== Figures and Heroes of Italian folklore ==
Below is a list of the folklore figures who have animated Italian folk tales since ancient Rome.

=== Traditional characters ===
- In Italian folklore, the Befana is an old woman who delivers gifts to children throughout Italy on Epiphany Eve (the night of January 5) in a similar way to Santa Claus or the Three Magi Kings. A popular belief is that her name derives from the Feast of Epiphany (Italian: Festa dell'Epifania).
- Santa Lucia is a holy woman who delivers gifts to children of Bergamo and province on 13 December, again like Santa Claus.

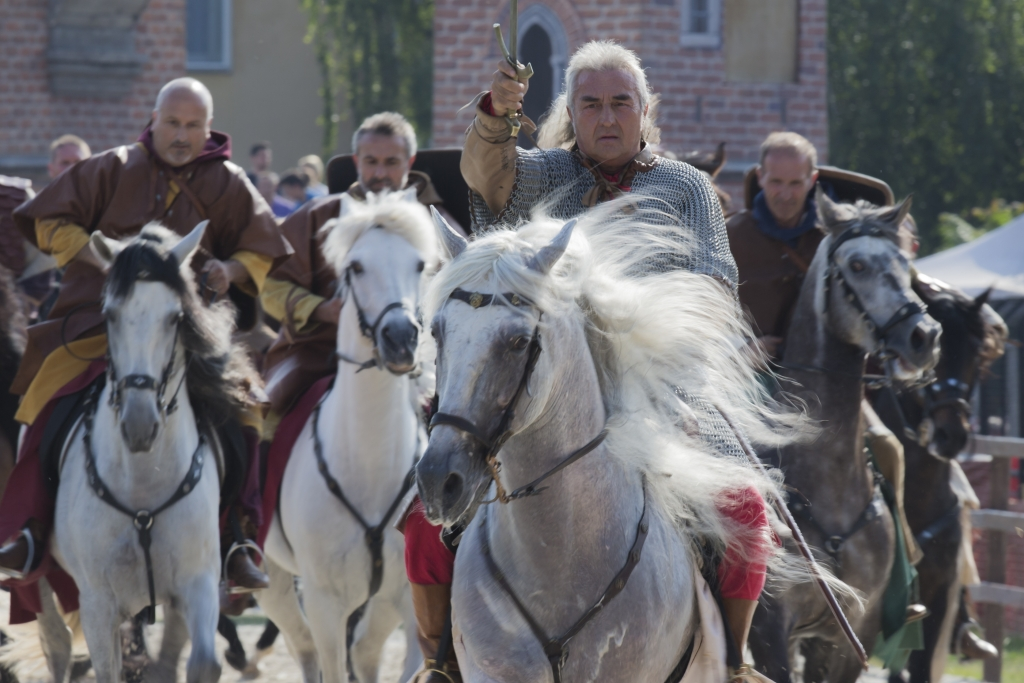
Folkloristic reconstruction of the Company of Death led by Alberto da Giussano who is preparing to carry out the charge during the battle of Legnano at the Palio di Legnano 2014

- Alberto da Giussano is a legendary character of the 12th century who would have participated, as a protagonist, in the battle of Legnano on 29 May 1176. In reality, according to historians, the actual military leader of the Lombard League in the famous military battle with Frederick Barbarossa was Guido da Landriano.
- The Mommotti in the Sardinian tradition they represent an imaginary figure used to frighten children. Sometimes they are associated with the boogeyman or with an evil ogre and their job is to take away children who do not behave well.
- The Benandanti were linked to a pagan-shamanic peasant cult based on the fertility of the land widespread in Friuli around the 16th-17th century. These were small congregations that worked to protect villages and the crops from the evil intervention of witches.
- Segnature is a traditional Italian folk‑healing practice involving ritual gestures (literally “signs”) and sacred words to heal illness, remove curses such as the evil eye, protect individuals, and even influence natural forces like weather. Practitioners—known as Segnatori or Segnatrici—trace crosses or other symbolic marks on the body or objects while reciting secret prayers passed down through family or community lineages. Recent ethnographic research classifies Segnature as a localized form of Italian shamanism, blending pre‑Christian folk beliefs with Catholic ritual elements.
- Bombasìn is a monstrous character of the tradition of the Polesine and the Venetian Lagoon. Traditionally linked to the customs of Brusavecia and Carnival, the character has the appearance of an angry bull, and represents the most ferocious and wild side of human nature. Sometimes he is accompanied on parades by peasants who hold him in check with a chain, while the Bombasìn scares young and old in its path. Its name derives from cotton wool, a word that in turn derives from the Greek word for cotton, a material used to build the large black matel that wraps the Bombasìn. More recent tales connect him to the mythical character of King Hadrian and to the Gnomes of Polesine.
- The Strego is a character of the popular tradition of Garfagnana. Unlike classic witches and sorcerers, dedicated to various exercises of witchcraft and aimed exclusively at procuring evil for people, the witch seems to have a more ambiguous attitude as it is usually disinterested in other human beings preferring to gather in groups to perform non-religious ceremonies. well identified.
- The Orcolat is a monstrous being that popular tradition indicates as the cause of the earthquakes in Friuli. The Orcolat is a recurring figure especially in the tales of the popular tradition.
- The Maskinganna, literally "master of deceptions", was a legendary character of Sardinian folklore who enjoyed making fun of sleeping people making them awaken in terror.
- The Pettenedda is a mythical creature that belongs to the Sardinian tradition and that would live in wells. The legend was probably invented by mothers to scare children and keep them away from wells.
- The Giufà is referred to in some areas of the country. He is a "village fool", whose actions and words usually serve to provide a moral message.
- The Marranghino is a fictional character of Lucanian folklore. Its myth shares common traits with that of Monachicchio, and is particularly widespread in the province of Matera.
- The Sa Mama 'e su Sole ("the Mother of the Sun"), is a fantastic creature of the Sardinian tradition used to scare children who did not want to go to sleep on summer afternoons, when the sun was too strong.
- The Babau (more rarely Babao, Barabao or Bobo) is in Italian folklore and other European regions, an imaginary monster with undefined characteristics that is traditionally invoked to scare children.
- The Orco (Ogre in Italian) is a fairy-tale character probably derived from Orcus of Roman mythology, an evil imaginary humanoid monster of enormous tonnage and with an irascible temperament, devouring human flesh, especially children.

=== Witches ===
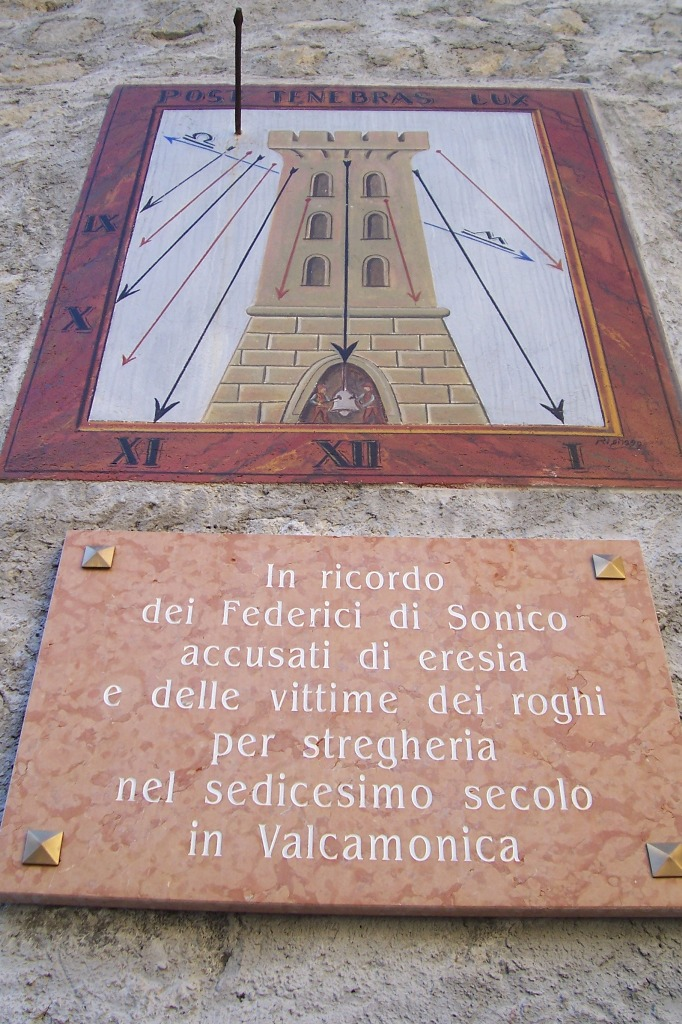
Val Camonica witch trials. Translation of the inscription: "In memory of the Federici di Sonico accused of heresy and of the victims of the burnings for witchcraft in the 16th century in Val Camonica".

- The Cogas or Bruxas, in Sardinian traditions, are witches with the appearance of an old woman, having the ability to assume any shape and size, both animal and vegetable or even of people; that's why they are dangerous.
- The Janare, in Benevento popular belief, especially in the peasant one, are the witches of Benevento whose terrible misdeeds are told.
- The Majare are the witches of the popular culture of Sicily.
- The Pantàsema is an ancient female figure linked to the agricultural rites of the pagan culture of Central Italy, particularly present in the Molise, Lazio, Abruzzo, Umbria e Marche territories.
- The witches of Valcamonica were persecuted between the 16th century in the Valcamonica.
- The Borda belong to the culture of the Emilia-Romagna and other areas of the Po Valley in Italy. It is a sort of witch that appears, blindfolded and horrible, both at night and on foggy days and kills anyone who has the misfortune to meet her. It is a personification of the fear related to swamps and marshlands, and to ponds and canals, invoked by adults to scare children and keep them away from such potentially dangerous places.
- The Masca is an important figure in Piedmontese folklore and popular belief, which attributes to her supernatural faculties handed down from mother to daughter or from grandmother to granddaughter.
- The Bàsura, a witch of Ligurian folklore whose tradition is widespread above all in the West, is bad, according to folklores. According to the legend, she is the witch who lives in the Toirano Caves (otherwise known as the Grotte della Strega, "caves of witch"); the legend developed when, after the discovery of the caves, all the labyrinths were closed, and the wind made strange noises. Legend has it that the Bàsura does not want anyone to enter its caves.
- The Giubiana is a witch of Lombard and Piedmontese folklore, often thin, with very long legs and red stockings. It lives in the woods and thanks to its long legs, it never sets foot on the ground, but moves from tree to tree. So he observes all those who enter the woods and frightens them, especially the children.
- The Maciara is a person to whom magical powers are attributed by the popular culture of Southern Italy.

=== Fairies ===
- The Janas were the fairies of Sardinian folklore. They lived in the so-called Domus de Janas, which were actually rock-cut tombs. According to other legends, they lived on top of the nurhags and spent their time weaving with a gold loom. Some Domus de Janas can be visited in the coastal area of Villasimius near Riso Beach, not far from the marina.
- The Anguana or Agana or Longana is an aquatic nymph belonging to Alpine mythology, also widespread in Umbria, and which is also spoken of in the area of the Marmore Falls, in which it would live and/or refresh itself daily. There is also talk of this fairy in Abruzzo, Tuscany (in the area of the Tuscan-Emilian Apennines), in Veneto and in Emilia-Romagna. As an aquatic nymph it lives only in fresh waters, such as lakes, rivers, streams, waterfalls or streams.
- The Bella 'mbriana, in the popular belief of the Neapolitan people, is the spirit of the house.

=== Sprites ===
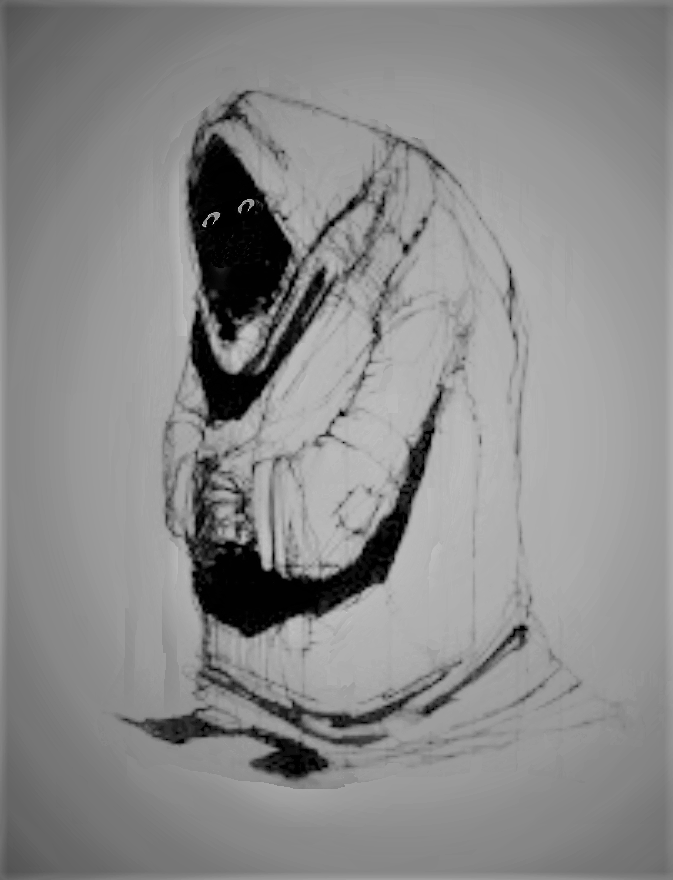
Monaciello

- The Buffardello, a sprite present in the popular tradition of the province of Lucca and in particular of the Garfagnana but also of the Lunigiana in the province of Massa-Carrara.
- The Gnefro is a sprite of the popular culture of the city of Terni and the Valnerina.
- The Muddittu is a sprite of the popular culture of Sicily.
- The Mazzamurello or Mazzamaurello is a sprite of the folkloric-fairytale tradition of the Marche, Lazio and Abruzzo.
- The Laurieddu is a malignant sprite of the folkloric imaginary of Salento.
- The Lenghelo is a goblin or sprite present in the popular tradition of the Castelli Romani which has its roots in ancient Rome.
- The Linchetto is a sprite present in the popular tradition of the province of Lucca.
- The Mazapégul is a mischievous nocturnal elf in the folklore of Romagna, known for disrupting sleep and tormenting beautiful young girls.
- The Mazaròl is a sprite of the folkloric-fairytale tradition of Dolomiti.
- The Monachicchio is a sprite present in the popular tradition of Basilicata.
- The Monaciello is a legendary sprite from the ancient folklore of Naples. Monaciello, which means "little Monk" in Neapolitan, is typically a benevolent man, short and stocky, dressed in a long monk's robe with a broad hood.
- The Squasc is a mythological being from the folklore of eastern Lombardy.
- The Tummà is a sprite present in the popular tradition of Apulia.

=== Ghosts ===
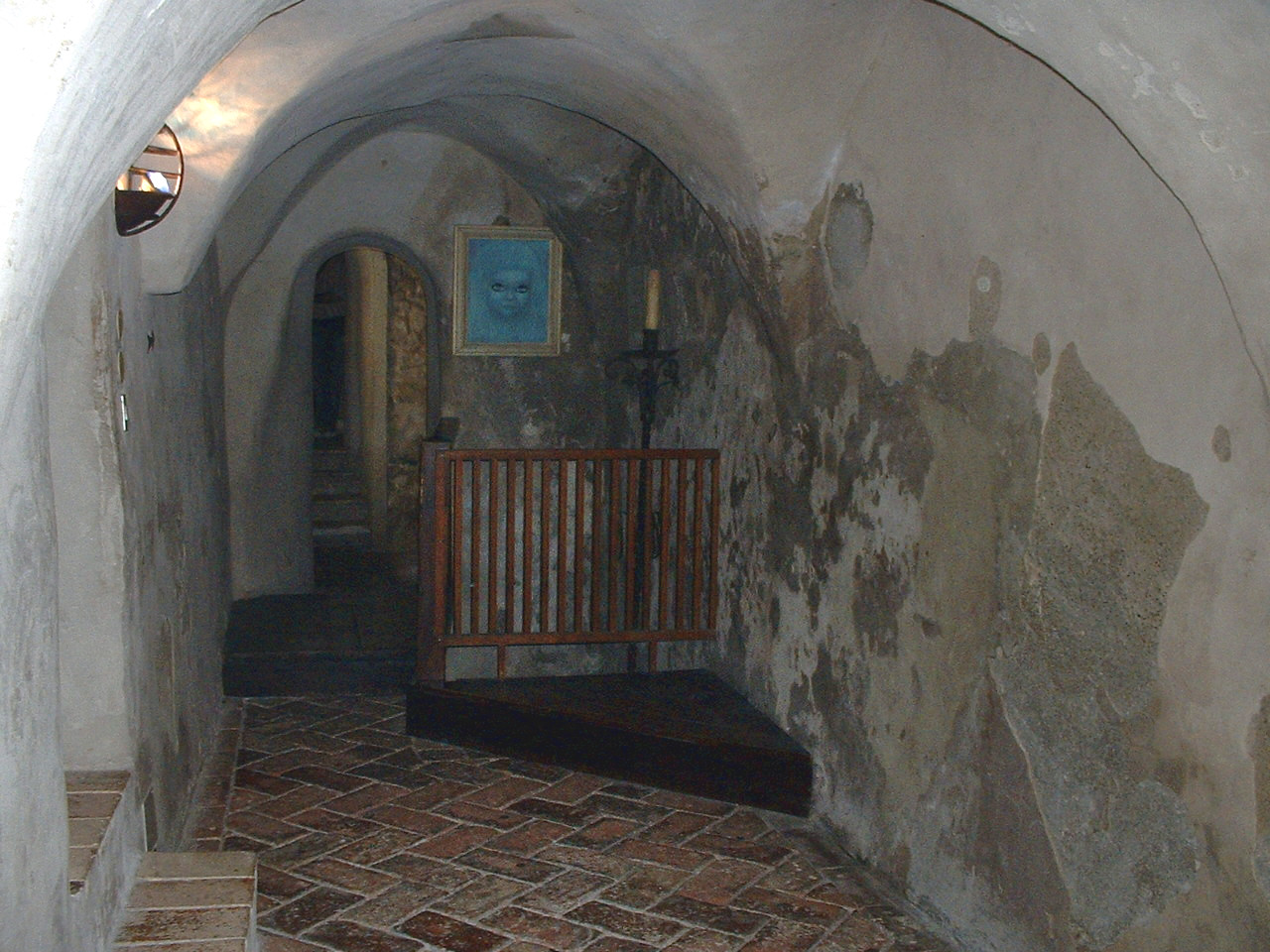
The corridor of the castle of Montebello, in province of Rimini, presumed home of the ghost of Azzurina

- The Confinati or the Anime Confinate are mythical figures widespread in the popular traditions of north-eastern Lombardy, especially in the Bergamo valleys, Val Camonica and Valtellina.
- The Pandafeca is a dreamlike manifestation, commonly widespread in the imaginary of the Abruzzo culture.
- According to legend, Azzurrina was the daughter of a certain Ugolinuccio di Montebello, lord of Montebello, in the modern province of Rimini, in the mid-14th century. According to the folktale, she would have mysteriously disappeared.
- The Bianca di Collalto tells of a young maid who was walled up alive due to the jealousy of her mistress. His ghost appears to the members of the Collalto family to announce joys or misfortunes.
- The Guria, is a spirit of the popular tradition of Barletta that inhabits the houses, often identified as the "spirit of the house".

=== Demons ===
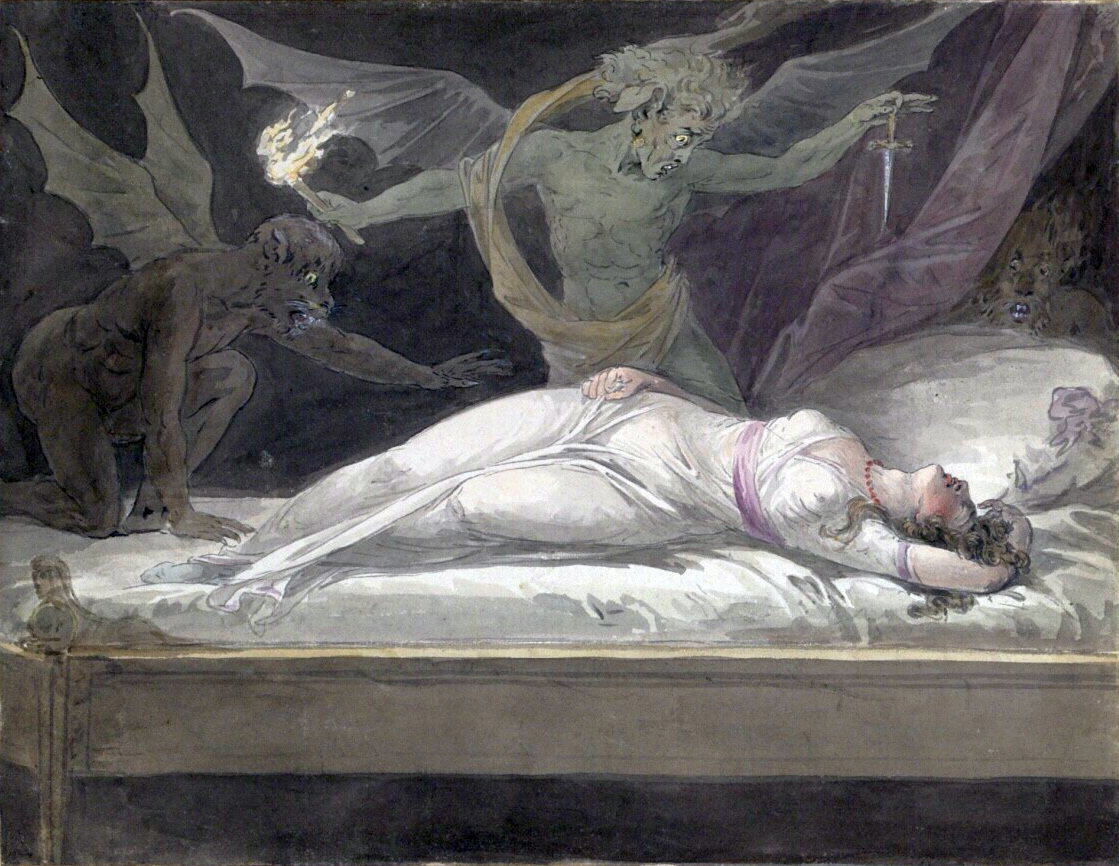
Incubus

- Aamon is a Grand Marquis of Hell who governs 40 infernal legions, and the 7th spirit of the Goetia. He is the demon of life and reproduction. According to the Dictionnaire Infernal by Collin de Plancy, he commands 40 legions of demons and carries the title of Prince.
- Su Ammuntadore or Ammuntadori is a creature of Sardinian mythology that would attack people in their sleep through nightmares.
- Maimone or Mamuthone is a divinity of nature current in the mythology and culture of Sardinia. He was transformed, with the advent of Christianity, into a demon.
- Krampus is a horned, anthropomorphic figure in Central and Eastern Alpine folklore who, during the Christmas season, scares children who have misbehaved. Krampus acts as an anti–Saint Nicholas, who, instead of giving gifts to good children, gives warnings and punishments to the bad children. Krampus belongs to the Pre-Christian Alpine traditions.
- Incubus is a demon in male form in folklore that seeks to have sexual intercourse with sleeping women. In medieval Europe, union with an incubus was supposed by some to result in the birth of witches, demons, and deformed human offspring. Parallels exist in many cultures. Walter Stephens alleges in "Demon Lovers", some traditions hold that repeated sexual activity with an incubus or succubus may result in the deterioration of health, an impaired mental state, or even death.
- Succubus is a demon or supernatural entity in folklore, in female form, that appears in dreams to seduce men, usually through sexual activity. According to religious traditions, repeated sexual activity with a succubus can cause poor physical or mental health, even death. In modern representations, a succubus is often depicted as a beautiful seductress or enchantress, rather than as demonic or frightening.

=== Animal creatures ===
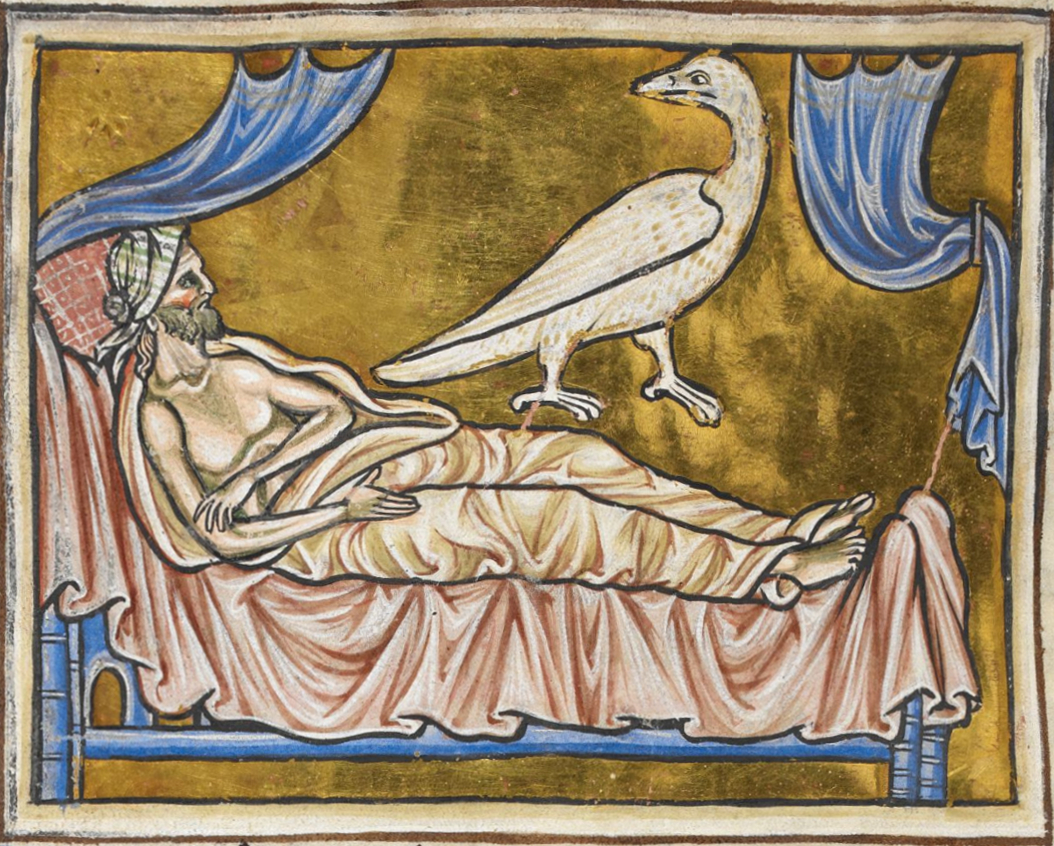
Caladrius

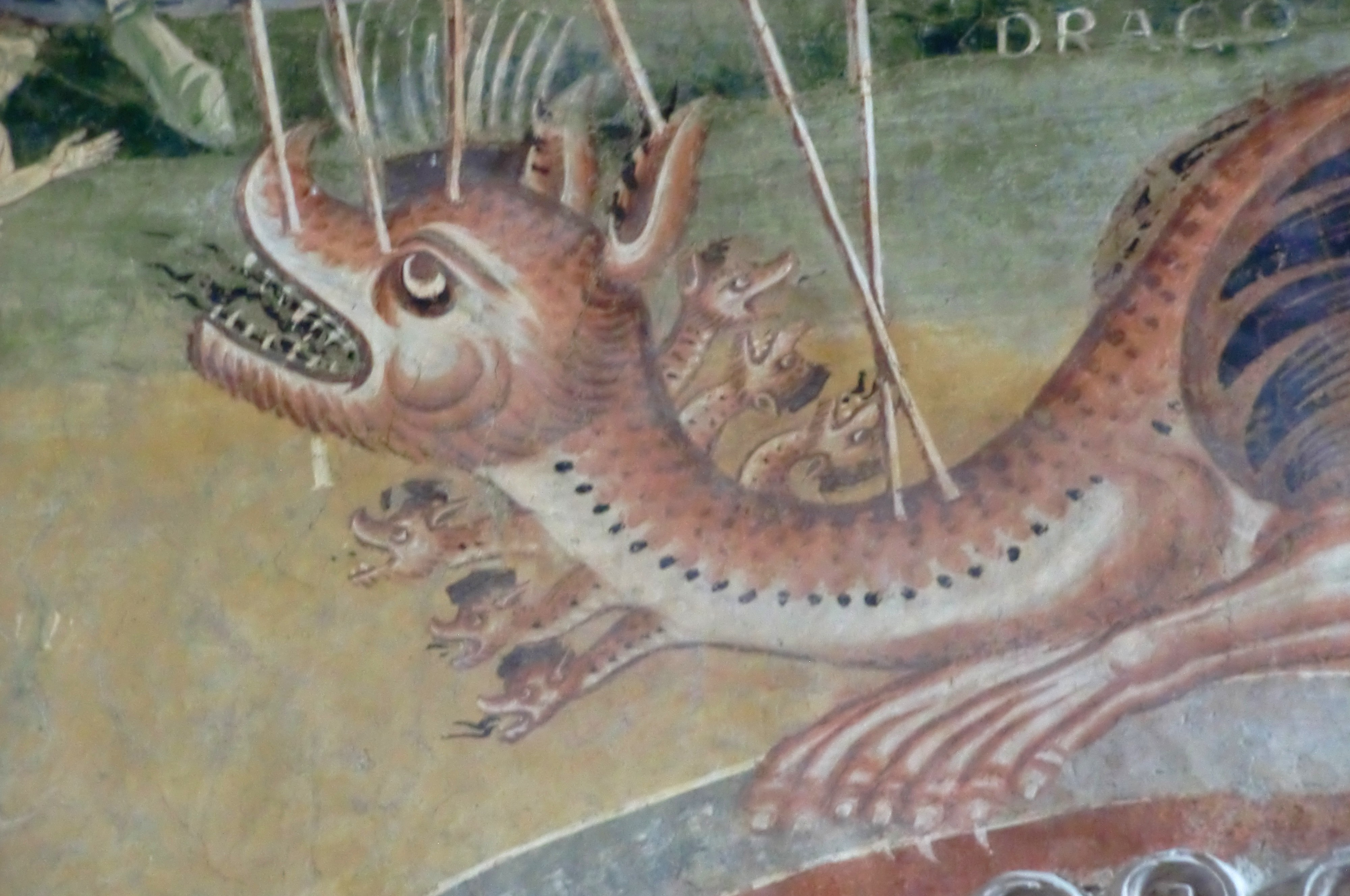
Tarantasio

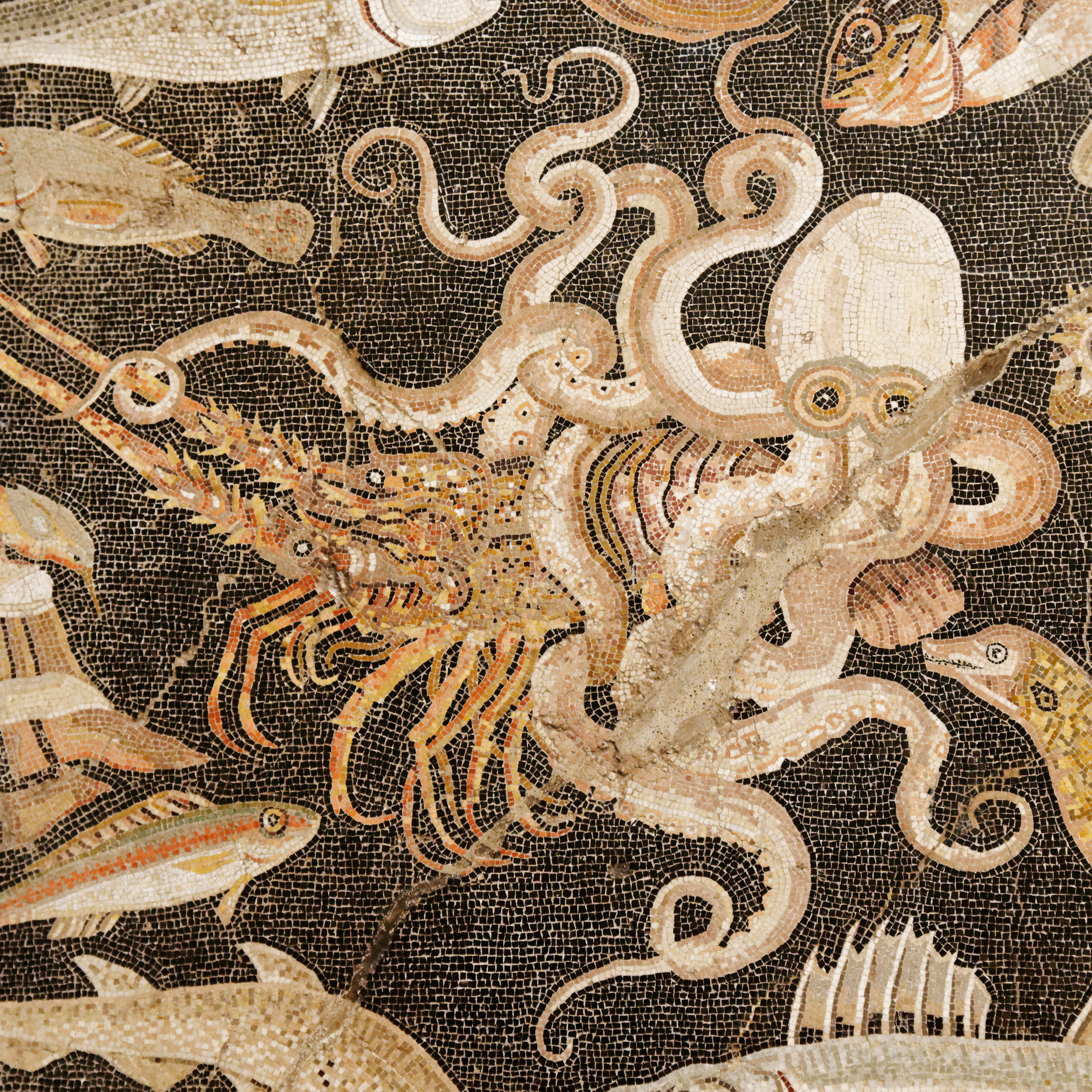
Ozena

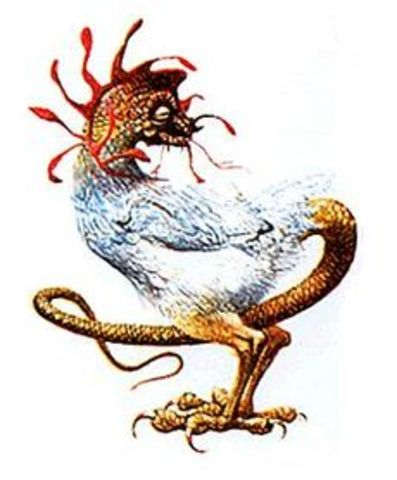
Bisso Galeto

- Badalisc is a mythical creature of the Val Camonica, in the southern central Alps.
- Thyrus, the dragon of Terni, is one of the most famous dragons of Italian folklore, a river dragon that besieged Terni in the Middle Ages. One day, a young and brave knight of the noble House of Cittadini, tired of witnessing the death of his fellow citizens and the depopulation of Terni, faced the dragon and killed it. From that day, the town assumed the creature in its coat of arms, accompanied by a Latin inscription: "Thyrus et amnis dederunt signa Teramnis" ("Thyrus and the river gave their insignia to Terni"), that stands under the banner of the town of Terni, honoring this legend.
- The Ferocious Beast, an enormous animal similar to a wolf. It ate pets and children and terrorized Milan during the 1790s and the Milanese organized a hunt against it. After months they killed the Ferocious Beast and displayed its body at the University of Pavia; but it is no longer there and has been missing for decades. Informal sources claim it was stolen, destroyed during World War II, or removed specifically by German actions during that war.
- The Caladrius, according to Roman mythology, is a snow-white bird that lives in the king's house.
- The Tarantasio is the name of a legendary dragon that terrorized the inhabitants of the ancient Gerundo Lake (now dried up), in the area of Lodi, in Lombardy. This mythological animal was believed to devour children, destroy boats, and with its pestilential breath, soak up the air and cause a strange disease called yellow fever.
- The Catoblepas is a legendary creature described by Pliny the Elder and Claudius Aelianus. In ancient Greek and Roman mythology he was an "African quadruped, depicted with his heavy head always lowered to the ground".
- The Amphisbaena is a mythical snake with two heads, one at each extremity of the body, and eyes that shine like lamps. The amphesibena as a mythological and legendary creature has been cited by Lucan, Pliny the Elder, and Dante Alighieri.
- The Erchitu is a legendary creature of Sardinian tradition. According to the ancient legends of Sardinia, a man who committed a serious fault would turn on full moon nights into a white ox with two large horns.
- The Marroca is a mythical animal which, according to peasant belief, lives essentially in the wetlands of the countryside of the Valdichiana, Siena, Arezzo, and Umbria.
- The Ozena is a legendary octopus described by Pliny the Elder and its name means "stinking octopus" due to its unpleasant smell. Most of the ozenas were small in size and remained at the bottom of the sea. In rare cases, some larger species attacked and ate humans.
- The Badalischio, it is said that this monster was born in the Gorga Nera, a small lake near the source of the Borbotto (Foreste Casentinesi, Monte Falterona, Campigna National Park, Tuscany). According to legend, he is endowed with a deadly poison.
- The Caddos birdes were fantastic creatures of Sardininian folklore, which appeared in the form of small horses with green skins very rare and very difficult to spot.
- The Serpente regolo or Regulus is a fantastic animal of the Tuscan, Umbrian, Abruzzese and Sabine traditions. It would be a large snake with a head "as big as that of a child", which lives in the scrublands, fields and ravines of the mountains.
- The Biddrina is a large aquatic snake which, according to legend, lives in the wetlands of the countryside of the province of Caltanissetta.
- The Jaculus is a small mythical serpent or dragon. It can be shown with wings and sometimes has front legs. It is also sometimes known as the javelin snake. It was said that the jaculus hid in the trees and sprang out at its victims. The force of it launching itself at the victim led to the association with javelins. Pliny described it as follows: "The jaculus darts from the branches of trees; and it is not only to our feet that the serpent is formidable, for these fly through the air even, just as though they were hurled from an engine." Lucan also describes the attack of the jaculus in the Pharsalia.
- In the folklore of Lombardy, more precisely of the provinces of Bergamo and Cremona, the Gata Carogna is a monstrous animal which would infest the dark alleys of the cities. She looks like a large red cat, with shaggy fur and an angry look, who would attack children to steal their souls.
- The Gatto mammone is a fictional monster of popular Italian folklore, in the form of a huge terrifying-looking cat. Such a cat would have been dedicated to frightening the grazing herds and would have had demonic movements and expressions. His cry would be a cross between a roar and a meow. The monster would be so stealthy as to attack unsuspecting victims and tear them to pieces without leaving even the bones.
- The Gigiàtt is, in Lombard folklore traditions, a deer of enormous proportions that feeds on hikers and travelers.
- The Scultone, in Sardinian popular belief, was a dragon-like creature that killed men and animals near Baunei.
- The Bisso Galeto is a legendary creature of the Veronese valleys. It has the body and head of a rooster, with a large red crest, wings full of spines and a snake's tail. Its normal size is quite small, making it similar to a small snake, but the Bisso Galeto can increase and decrease the length of its body at its will.
- The Tatzelwurm is a legendary creature of the Alps, described as a lizard with only four or two short legs and a stubby tail.
- The Lonza a creature described in Dante's Inferno. It represents the vice of lust or envy. It is described in the Tuscan Bestiary as a hybrid between a Lion and a Lynx or Leopard.

=== Magic items ===
- The Scrixoxiu, in Sardinian traditions, is a casket belonging to a spirit of a deceased family member.
- The Libro del comando is the name by which the black magic texts containing the description of the methods to know and distinguish benign and evil spirits were indicated, as well as the magic formulas to invoke their intervention, in order to obtain their help for means of "responses and revelations", the circulation of which was fought by authority.
- The Libro del Cinquecento or Libru do cincucentu is a legendary book that would be kept in Ficarra, Sicily. Legend has it that it was a magic book that contained formulas that made it possible to overcome all problems.

=== Other tales ===
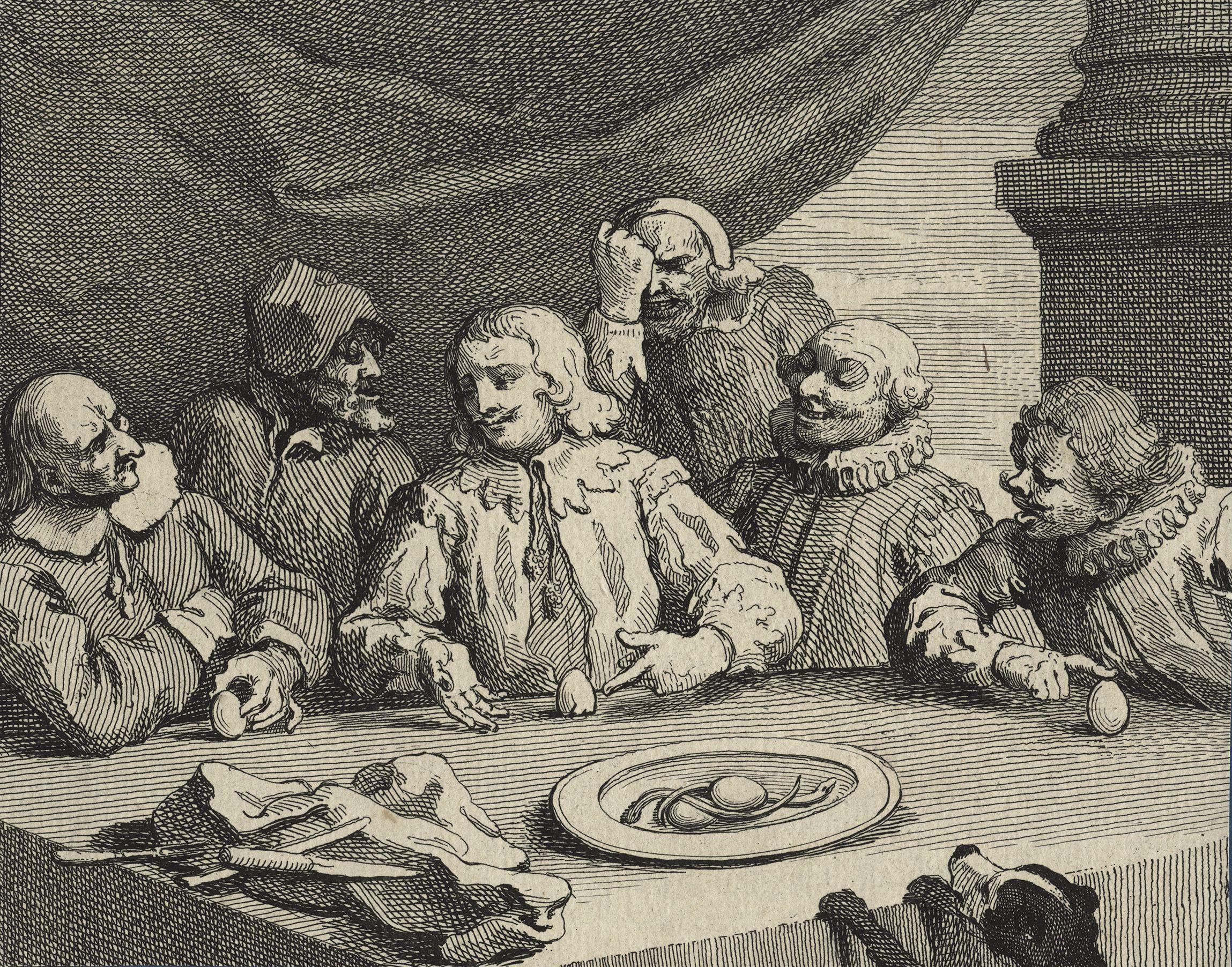
Columbus Breaking the Egg by William Hogarth, 1752

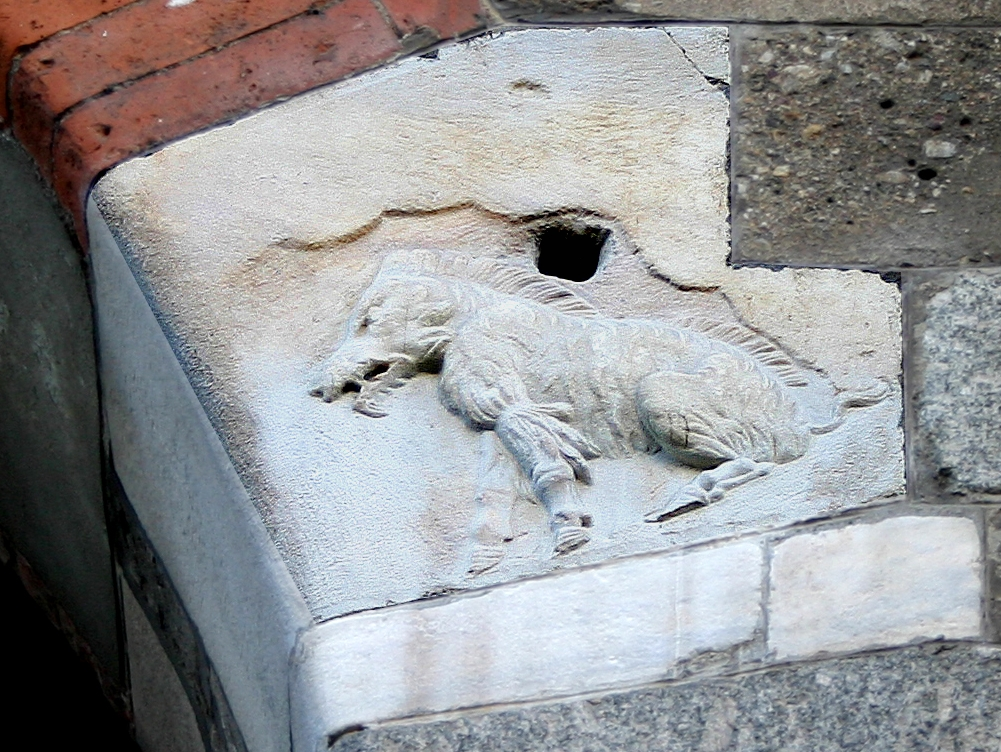
Bas relief representing the scrofa semilanuta on the walls of Palazzo della Ragione, Milan

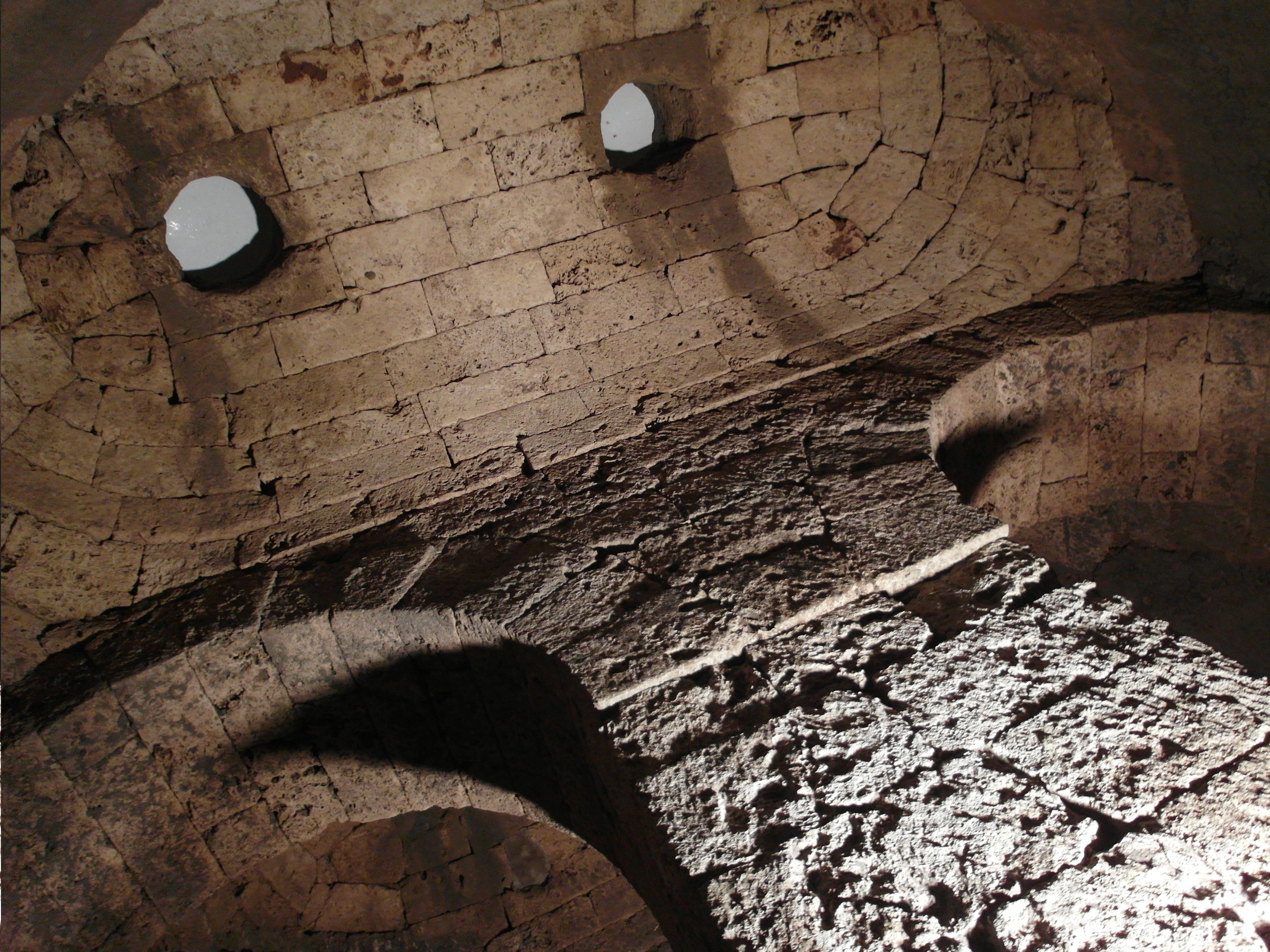
Etruscan-Roman reservoir in Chiusi, Tuscany, alleged Tomb of Lars Porsena

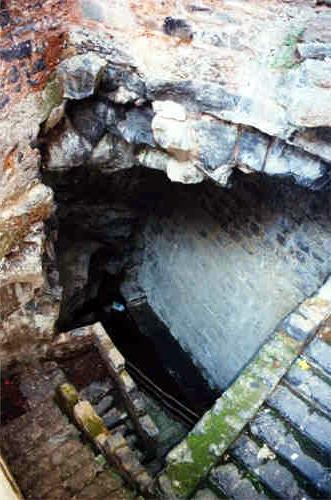
Access to the Gammazita well

- An egg of Columbus refers to a brilliant idea or discovery that seems simple or easy after the fact. The expression refers to an apocryphal story, dating from at least the 16th century, in which it is said that Christopher Columbus, having been told that finding a new trade route was inevitable and no great accomplishment, challenges his critics to make an egg stand on its tip. After his challengers give up, Columbus does it himself by tapping the egg on the table to flatten its tip. The story is often alluded to when discussing creativity. The term has also been used as the trade name of a tangram puzzle and several mechanical puzzles. It also shows that anything can be done by anyone with the right set of skills; however, not everyone knows how to do it.
- Cola Pesce, also known as Pesce Cola (i.e., Nicholas Fish) is an Italian folktale about a merman, mentioned in literature as early as the 12th century. Many variants and retellings have been recorded. The first known literary mention was by a 12th-century poet, Raimon Jordon of Provencal, who referred to a "Nichola de Bar" (Nicholas of Bari) who lived with the fishes.
- The scrofa semilanuta is an ancient emblem of the city of Milan, Italy, dating back at least to the Middle Ages — and, according to a local legend, to the very foundation of Milan. Several ancient sources (including Sidonius Apollinaris, Datius, and, more recently, Andrea Alciato) have argued that the scrofa semilanuta is connected to the etymology of the ancient name of Milan, Mediolanum, and this is still occasionally mentioned in modern sources, although this interpretation has long been dismissed by scholars.
- According to Italian tradition, the Days of the Blackbird are the last three days of January. Also according to tradition they would be the three coldest days of the year. According to tradition, the explanation of the phrase derives from a legend according to which, to shelter from the great cold, a blackbird and its chicks, originally white, took refuge inside a chimney, from which they emerged on February 1, all black because of the soot. From that day on, all the blackbirds were black.
- According to a popular Italian tradition, the Days of the Old Woman (or Lent Days) are the last three days of March, ie March 29, 30 and 31, in which it is believed that the cold of the recently finished winter often returns. : are considered the coldest days of spring. The Days of the Old Woman owe their name to an ancient popular legend: once, when March was only 28 days old, an old woman, now anticipating the warmth of spring, said: "March, now you can no longer harm me, because today it is already April and the Sun is already up! "; so it was that March, offended, asked for three more days in April and used it to bring the winter cold back to earth and make the old woman sick.
- The Rape of the Sabine Women, also known as the "Abduction of the Sabine Women" or the "Kidnapping of the Sabine Women", was an incident in Roman mythology in which the men of Rome committed a mass abduction of young women from the other cities in the region. It has been a frequent subject of painters and sculptors, particularly during the Renaissance and post-Renaissance eras. The word "rape" (cognate with "rapto" in Portuguese and other Romance languages, meaning "kidnap") is the conventional translation of the Latin word raptio used in the ancient accounts of the incident. Modern scholars tend to interpret the word as "abduction" or "kidnapping" as opposed to a sexual assault.
- Madonna Oriente is an Italian mythical figure, often mentioned in the trials held in cases of witch-hunt. Connected to pagan cults, it has been placed side by side with the figures of Diana, Herodias, Perchta. It could manifest itself in various forms, usually as a ghost or as a huntress, while at times it appeared as a beautiful girl who lived in the woods, dressed only in hair, with a look capable of bewitching people.
- The Tomb of Lars Porsena is a legendary ancient building in what is now central Italy, tomb of the Etruscan king Lars Porsena. Allegedly built around 500 BCE at Clusium (modern Chiusi, in south-eastern Tuscany), and was described as follows by the Roman writer Marcus Varro (116–27 BCE). In the 18th century Angelo Cortenovis proposed that the tomb of Lars Porsena was a machine for conducting lightning.
- Dina and Clarenza are two women connected in legend with the historical siege of Messina by Charles I of Anjou during the Sicilian Vespers in August 1282. Dina and Clarenza, two Messinese women, were heroines who, in legend, opposed the assaults of the Angevin forces. The two women were standing guard on the wall. As soon as they saw the enemies, they did all they could to repel the attack. While Dina continually hurled rocks down on the enemy soldiers, Clarenza rang the bells in the campanile of the Duomo, from which she awakened the whole city. Thus the Messinese rushed to the defense of their city and repelled the attack.
- Heliodorus of Catania is a semi-legendary personage accused by his contemporaries of being a necromancer practicing witchcraft.
- Pietro Bailardo or Pietro Baialardo is a legendary character accused by his contemporaries of being a magician and necromancer in direct relationship with the devil.
- Maria Puteolana is a semi-legendary figure in the history of Pozzuoli. The only reference to this figure is provided by Francesco Petrarca who in 1341 with Robert, King of Naples, would have visited Pozzuoli in order to meet the "very famous virago Maria, later called Maria Puteolana".
- Pacciûgo and Pacciûga are two figures remembered in two statues to which one of the oldest legends with a religious background in Genoa is linked.
- The Legend of San Pietro al Monte or the Legend of the White Boar of Civate wants to explain the foundation of the church of the same name as an act of devotion of the Lombard King Desiderius.
- Gammazita is a young girl, the protagonist of a Catania legend linked to the history of the Angevins of Sicily. Its name was also given to a site in the historic center of the Sicilian city, a natural cavity called the well of Gammazita.
- The beast of Cusago was a she-wolf who sowed panic during the summer of 1792 in the Cusago wood in the Duchy of Milan. The animal, as it also happened in that period in similar cases in Lombardy, but also elsewhere, had become anthropophagous and killed and devoured several victims, always boys and girls.

== Folk heroes ==
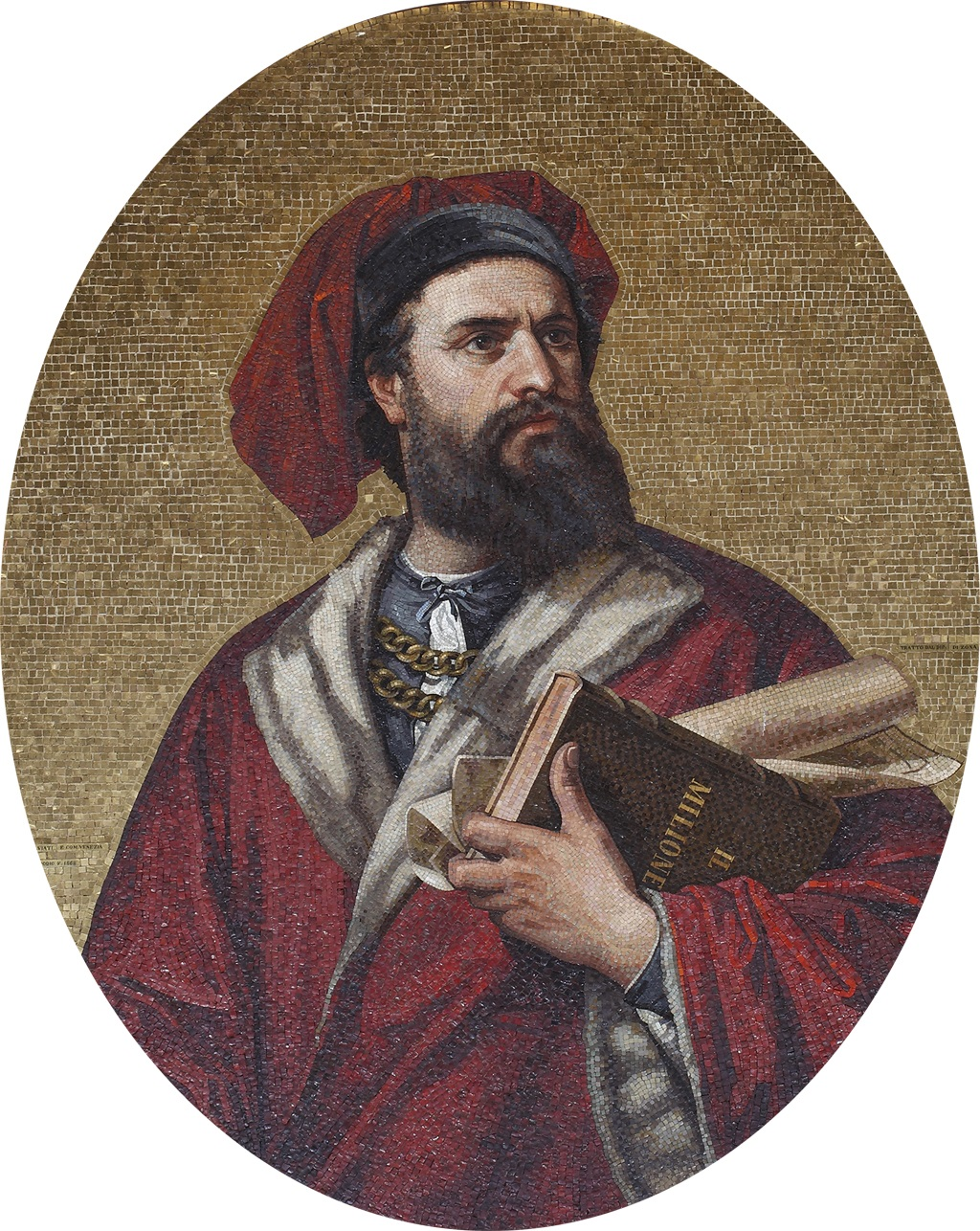
Marco Polo recorded his 24 years-long travels in the Book of the Marvels of the World, introducing Europeans to Central Asia and China.

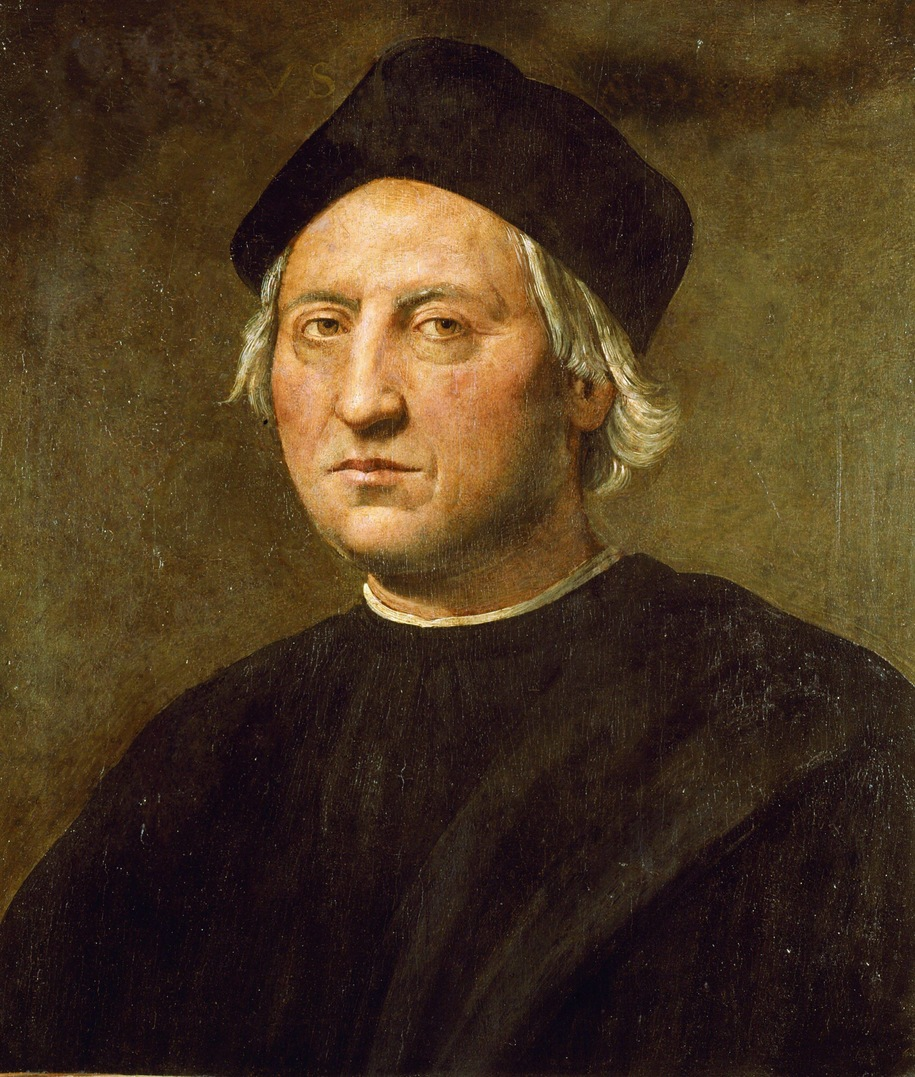
Christopher Columbus leads an expedition to the New World, 1492. His voyages are celebrated as the discovery of the Americas from a European perspective, and they opened a new era in the history of humankind and sustained contact between the two worlds.

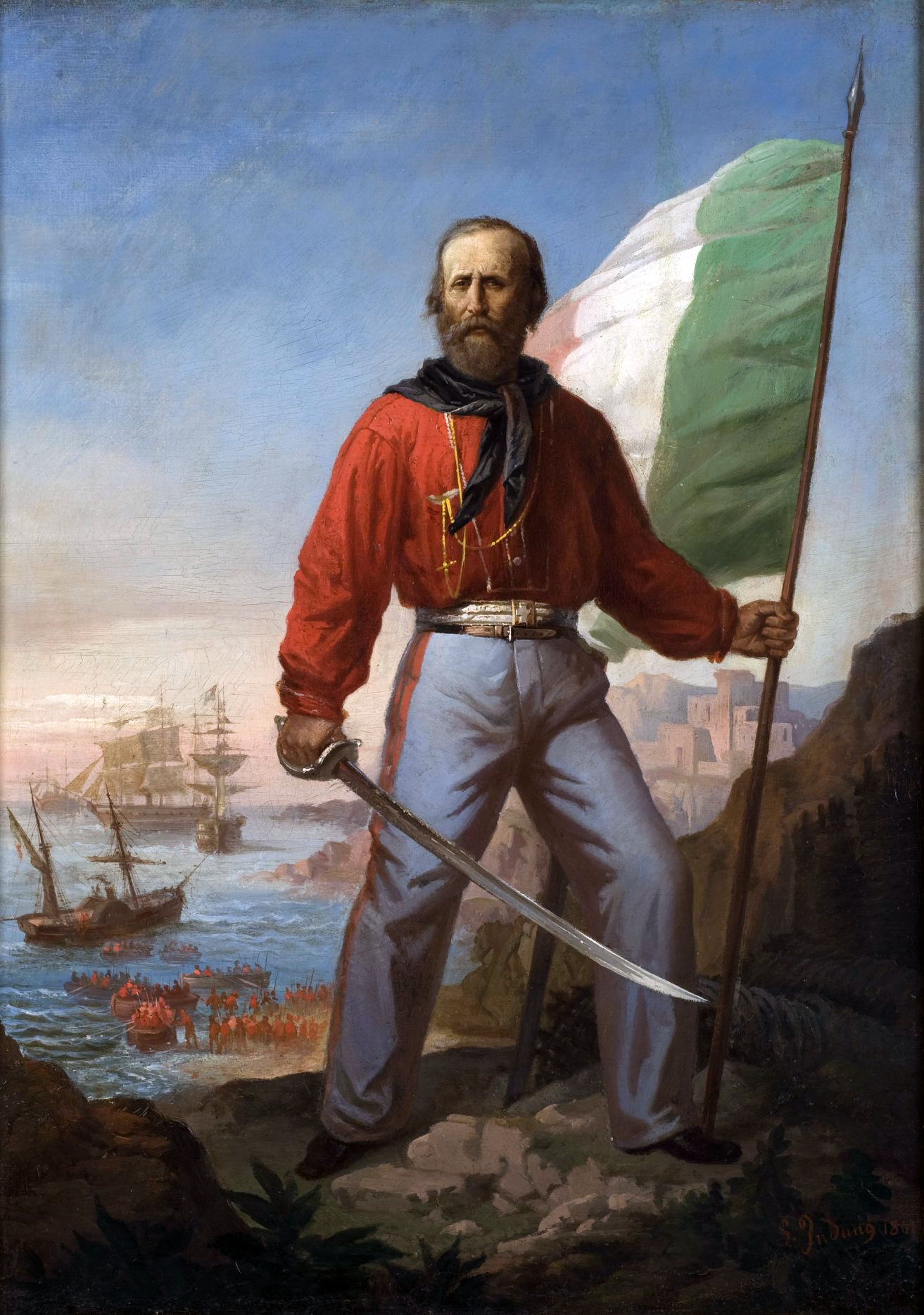
Giuseppe Garibaldi during the Expedition of the Thousand holding a flag of Italy. He is considered one of the greatest generals of modern times. Garibaldi is also known as the "Hero of the Two Worlds" because of his military enterprises in South America and Europe.

- Ducetius – he was a Hellenized leader of the Sicels and founder of a united Sicilian state and numerous cities. It is thought he may have been born around the town of Mineo. His story is told through the Greek historian Diodorus Siculus in the 1st century BCE, who drew on the work of Timaeus. He was a native Sicilian, but his education was Greek and was very much influenced by Greek civilization in Sicily.
- Hermocrates – he was an ancient Syracusan general during the Athenians' Sicilian Expedition in the midst of the Peloponnesian War. He is also remembered as a character in the Timaeus and Critias dialogues of Plato. The first historical reference to Hermocrates comes from Thucydides, where he appears at the congress of Gela in 424 BC giving a speech demanding the Sicilian Greeks stop their quarrelling and unite against the Athenians, who had been attacking the Sicilian cities for supporting Corinth.
- Julius Caesar – he was a Roman general and statesman. A member of the First Triumvirate, Caesar led the Roman armies in the Gallic Wars before defeating his political rival Pompey in a civil war, and subsequently became dictator from 49 BC until his assassination in 44 BC. He played a critical role in the events that led to the demise of the Roman Republic and the rise of the Roman Empire. After assuming control of government, Caesar began a program of social and governmental reforms, including the creation of the Julian calendar. He gave citizenship to many residents of far regions of the Roman Republic. He initiated land reform and support for veterans.
- Scipio Africanus – he was a Roman general and statesman, most notable as one of the main architects of Rome's victory against Carthage in the Second Punic War. Often regarded as one of the best military commanders and strategists of all time, his greatest military achievement was the defeat of Hannibal at the Battle of Zama in 202 BC. This victory in Africa earned him the epithet Africanus, literally meaning "the African," but meant to be understood as a conqueror of Africa. Scipio Africanus is mentioned in Il Canto degli Italiani, the national anthem of Italy since 1946.
- Augustus was the founder of the Roman Empire. He reigned as the first Roman emperor from 27 BC until his death in AD 14. The reign of Augustus initiated an imperial cult, as well as an era of imperial peace (the Pax Romana or Pax Augusta) in which the Roman world was largely free of armed conflict. The Principate system of government was established during his reign and lasted until the Crisis of the Third Century. Augustus dramatically enlarged the empire, annexing Egypt, Dalmatia, Pannonia, Noricum, and Raetia, expanding possessions in Africa, and completing the conquest of Hispania, but he suffered a major setback in Germania. Beyond the frontiers, he secured the empire with a buffer region of client states and made peace with the Parthian Empire through diplomacy. He reformed the Roman system of taxation, developed networks of roads with an official courier system, established a standing army, established the Praetorian Guard as well as official police and fire-fighting services for Rome, and rebuilt much of the city during his reign. Augustus created during the Roman Empire for the first time an administrative region called Italia with inhabitants called Italicus Populus; for this reason historians called him Father of Italians.
- Alberto da Giussano – he is a legendary character of the 12th century who would have participated, as a protagonist, in the battle of Legnano on 29 May 1176. In reality, according to historians, the actual military leader of the Lombard League in the famous military battle with Frederick Barbarossa was Guido da Landriano. Historical analyses made over time have indeed shown that the figure of Alberto da Giussano never existed. In the past, historians, attempting to find a real confirmation, hypothesized the identification of his figure with Albertus de Carathe (Alberto da Carate) and Albertus Longus (Alberto Longo), both among the Milanese who signed the pact in Cremona in March 1167 which established the Lombard League, or in an Alberto da Giussano mentioned in an appeal of 1196 presented to Pope Celestine III on the administration of the church-hospital of San Sempliciano. These, however, are all weak identifications, given that they lack clear and convincing historical confirmation.
- Marco Polo – he was a Venetian merchant, explorer and writer who travelled through Asia along the Silk Road between 1271 and 1295. His travels are recorded in The Travels of Marco Polo (also known as Book of the Marvels of the World and Il Milione, c. 1300), a book that described to Europeans the then mysterious culture and inner workings of the Eastern world, including the wealth and great size of the Mongol Empire and China in the Yuan Dynasty, giving their first comprehensive look into China, Persia, India, Japan and other Asian cities and countries. Marco was appointed to serve as Khan's foreign emissary, and he was sent on many diplomatic missions throughout the empire and Southeast Asia, such as in present-day Burma, India, Indonesia, Sri Lanka and Vietnam. As part of this appointment, Marco also travelled extensively inside China, living in the emperor's lands for 17 years and seeing many things that had previously been unknown to Europeans.
- Eleanor of Arborea – she was one of the most powerful and important, and one of the last, judges of the Judgedom of Arborea in Sardinia, and Sardinia's most famous heroine. She is also known for updating of the Carta de Logu, promulgated by her father Marianus IV and revisited by her brother Hugh III.
- Roger I of Sicily – he was a Norman nobleman who became the first Count of Sicily from 1071 to 1101. He was a member of the House of Hauteville, and his descendants in the male line continued to rule Sicily down to 1194. Roger was born in Normandy, and came to southern Italy as a young man in 1057. He participated in several military expeditions against the Emirate of Sicily beginning in 1061. He was invested with part of Sicily and the title of count by his brother, Robert Guiscard, Duke of Apulia, in 1071. By 1090, he had conquered the entire island. In 1091, he conquered Malta. The state he created was merged with the Duchy of Apulia in 1127 and became the Kingdom of Sicily in 1130.
- Christopher Columbus was an explorer and navigator from the Republic of Genoa who completed four Spanish-based voyages across the Atlantic Ocean sponsored by the Catholic Monarchs, opening the way for the widespread European exploration and colonization of the Americas. His expeditions were the first known European contact with the Caribbean and Central and South America. Columbus's expeditions inaugurated a period of exploration, conquest, and colonization that lasted for centuries, thus bringing the Americas into the European sphere of influence. The transfer of plants, animals, precious metals, culture, human populations, technology, diseases, and ideas between the Old World and New World that followed his first voyage are known as the Columbian exchange. These events and the effects which persist to the present are often cited as the beginning of the modern era.
- Giuseppe Garibaldi – he was an Italian general, patriot, revolutionary and republican. He contributed to Italian unification and the creation of the Kingdom of Italy. He is considered one of the greatest generals of modern times and one of Italy's "fathers of the fatherland", along with Camillo Benso, Count of Cavour, Victor Emmanuel II of Italy and Giuseppe Mazzini. Garibaldi is also known as the "Hero of the Two Worlds" because of his military enterprises in South America and Europe. Garibaldi became an international figurehead for national independence and republican ideals, and is considered by the twentieth-century historiography and popular culture as Italy's greatest national hero. He was showered with admiration and praise by many intellectuals and political figures, including Abraham Lincoln, William Brown, Francesco de Sanctis, Victor Hugo, Alexandre Dumas, Malwida von Meysenbug, George Sand, Charles Dickens, Friedrich Engels and Che Guevara. Historian A. J. P. Taylor called him "the only wholly admirable figure in modern history". In the popular telling of his story, he is associated with the red shirts that his volunteers, the Garibaldini, wore in lieu of a uniform.
- Cesare Battisti – he was an Italian patriot, geographer, socialist politician and journalist of Austrian citizenship, who became a prominent Italian irredentist at the start of World War I. He was born the son of a merchant at Trento, a city with a predominantly Italian-speaking population, which at the time was part of the Cisleithanian crown land of Tyrol in Austria-Hungary. With Italy's entry into World War I following the 1915 London Pact, though an Austrian citizen, Battisti fought against the Austro-Hungarian Army in the Alpini Corps at the Italian Front. After the Battle of Asiago, he and his 2nd Lt Fabio Filzi were captured by the Austrian forces on 10 July 1916 and faced a court-martial in his hometown Trento at the Castello del Buonconsiglio, charged with high treason. Though Battisti officially enjoyed parliamentary immunity, he was sentenced to death by strangulation.
- Giovanni Falcone and Paolo Borsellino – judges and prosecuting magistrates. From their office in the Palace of Justice in Palermo, Sicily, they spent most of his professional life trying to overthrow the power of the Sicilian Mafia. After a long and distinguished careers, culminating in the Maxi Trial in 1986–1987, Falcone was assassinated by the Corleonesi Mafia in the Capaci bombing, while Borsellino was killed by a car bomb in Via D'Amelio. They were named as heroes of the last 60 years in the 13 November 2006 issue of Time Magazine. In recognition of their tireless effort and sacrifice during the anti-mafia trials, they were both awarded the Gold Medal for Civil Valor and were acknowledged as martyrs of the Catholic Church.

== Folk dance ==
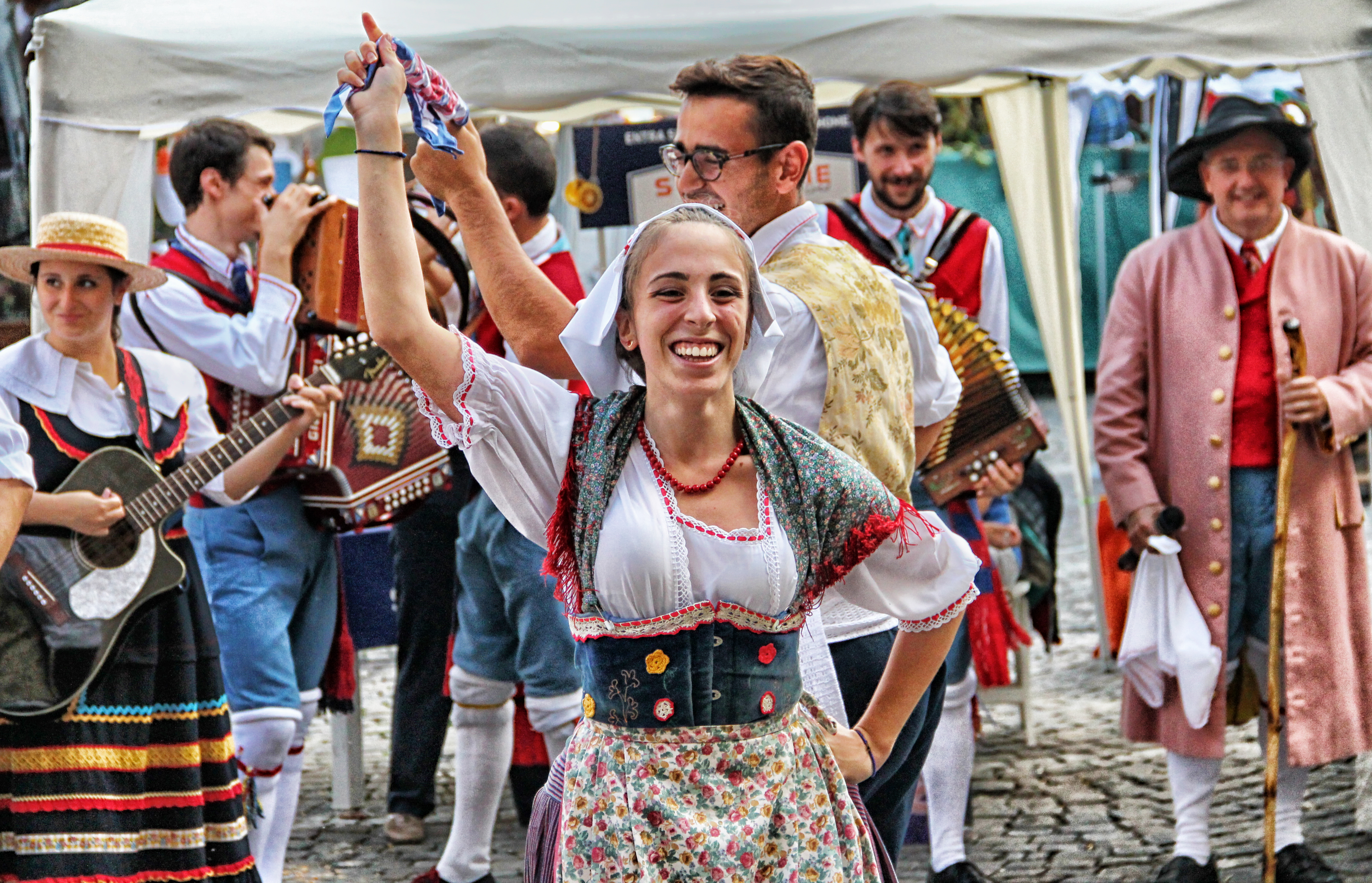
Italian folk dance in Marche

Italian folk dance has been an integral part of Italian culture for centuries. Dance has been a continuous thread in Italian life from Dante through the Renaissance, the advent of the tarantella in Southern Italy, and the modern revivals of folk music and dance. One of the earliest attempts to systematically collect folk dances is Gaspare Ungarelli's 1894 work Le vecchie danze italiane ancora in uso nella provincia bolognese ("Old Italian dances still in use in the province of Bologna") which gives brief descriptions and music for some 30 dances.

In 1925, Benito Mussolini's government set up the Opera Nazionale Dopolavoro (OND) or National Recreational Club as a means of promoting sports and cultural activities and one of its accomplishments was a wide survey of folk music and dance in Italy at that time. The work was published in 1931 as Costumi, musica, danze e feste popolari italiane ("Italian popular customs, music, dance and festivals"). In September 1945 OND was replaced by a new organization, the Ente Nazionale Assistenza Lavoratori (ENAL), headquartered in Rome. In partnership with the International Folk Music Council, ENAL sponsored a Congress and Festival in Venice September 7–11, 1949 which included many of the outstanding researchers in Italian folklore as well as folk dance and music groups from various Italian regions.

ENAL was dissolved in late 1978 but earlier in October 1970, the Italian folklore groups who had been members of ENAL set up a separate organization, which in 1978 became the Federazione Italiana Tradizioni Populari (FITP). The FITP publishes a newsletter and a scholarly publication Il Folklore D'Italia. An interest in preserving and fostering folk art, music and dance among Italian Americans and the dedication and leadership of Elba Farabegoli Gurzau led to the formation of the Italian Folk Art Federation of America (IFAFA) in May 1979. The group sponsors an annual conference and has published a newsletter, Tradizioni, since 1980.

== Folk music ==
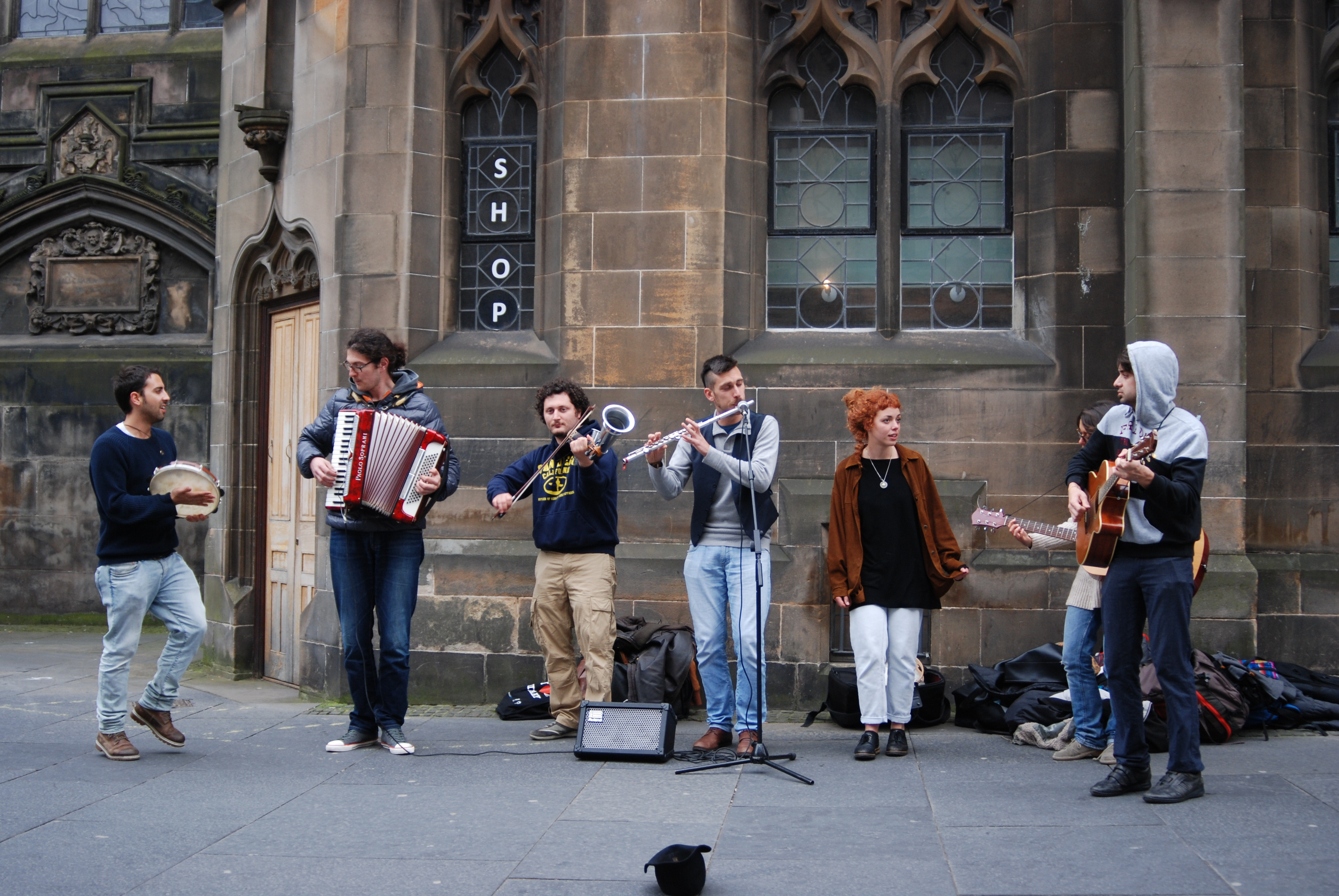
Italian folk musicians performing in Edinburgh, Scotland

Italian folk music has a deep and complex history. National unification came quite late to the Italian Peninsula, so its many hundreds of separate cultures remained un-homogenized until quite recently. Moreover, Italian folk music reflects Italy's geographic position at the south of Europe and in the center of the Mediterranean Sea: Celtic, Slavic, Arabic, Greek, Spanish and Byzantine influences are readily apparent in the musical styles of the Italian regions. Italy's rough geography and the historic dominance of small city states has allowed quite diverse musical styles to coexist in close proximity.

The Celtic and Slavic influences on the group and open-voice choral works of the Northern Italy contrast with the Greek, Byzantine, and Arabic influenced strident monody of the Southern Italy. In the Central Italy these influences combine, while indigenous traditions like narrative and ballad singing remain. The music of the island of Sardinia is distinct from that of the rest of Italy, and is best known for the polyphonic chanting of the tenores.

The modern understanding of Italian folk music has its roots in the growth of ethnomusicology in the 1940s and 1950s and in the resurgence of regionalism in Italy at the time. The Centro Nazionale di Studi di Musica Popolare (CNSMP), now part of the Accademia Nazionale di Santa Cecilia, was started in 1948 to study and archive the various musical styles throughout Italy. The Italian folk revival was accelerating by 1966, when the Istituto Ernesto de Martino was founded by Gianni Bosio in Milan to document Italian oral culture and traditional music. Today, Italy's folk music is often divided into several spheres of geographic influence, a classification system proposed by Alan Lomax in 1956 and often repeated since.

== See also ==
- Italian folk dance
- Italian folk music
- Traditions of Italy
