= Sodom =

Sodom may refer to:

== Places ==
=== Historic ===
- Sodom and Gomorrah, cities mentioned in the Book of Genesis

=== United States ===
- Sodom, Kentucky, a ghost town
- Sodom, New York, a hamlet
- Sodom, Ohio, an unincorporated community
- Sodom, West Virginia, an unincorporated community
- Adamant, Vermont or Sodom
- Revere, North Carolina or Sodom
- Sodom, a community within North Canaan, Connecticut

=== United Kingdom ===
- Sodom, Shetland, Scotland, UK
- Sodom, Wiltshire, a community near Dauntsey, Wiltshire, UK

=== Elsewhere ===
- Sodom, Ontario, Canada
- Mount Sodom or Mount Sedom, Israel
- Winschoten or Sodom, Netherlands

== Entertainment ==
- Sodom (band), a thrash metal band
  - Sodom (album), an album by Sodom
- Sodom, or the Quintessence of Debauchery, a drama
- Sodom (Final Fight), a character in Final Fight and Street Fighter series
- Sodom, a kaiju from Ultraman Dyna
- Sodom, a name of the capital city of Earth from Einhänder

== Other ==
- Sodomy, the sexual practice allegedly common in the Biblical Sodom.

== See also ==
- Sodom and Gomorrah (disambiguation)
- Sodoma
