= Sodom and Gomorrah (disambiguation) =

Sodom and Gomorrah were infamous Biblical cities.

Sodom and Gomorrah may also refer to:

- Sodom and Gomorrah (1922 film), an Austrian silent movie
- Sodom and Gomorrah (1962 film), a Franco-Italian-American movie
- Sodom and Gomorrah: The Last Seven Days, a 1975 pornographic movie by the Mitchell Brothers
- Sodom and Gomorrah (play), a play by Jean Giraudoux
- Sodom and Gomorrah, volume four in the Marcel Proust novel In Search of Lost Time
- Sodom and Gomorrah, a 1928 novel by Turkish author Yakup Kadri Karaosmanoğlu
- "Sodom and Gomorrah", a disco song by Village People on Macho Man
- "Sodom & Gomorra", a heavy metal song by Accept on Death Row
- "Sodom & Gomorrah", a song by pop singer Dorian Electra
- "Sodom & Gomorrah", a heavy metal song by Sodom on Genesis XIX
- Sodom and Gomorrah, ring names of the professional wrestling team Mark Jindrak and Matt Morgan
- Sodom and Gomorrah (comics), fictional characters from DC Comics

== See also ==
- Sodom (disambiguation)
- Gomorrah (disambiguation)
