= Monaciello =

Creature from the folklore of Naples, Italy

Monacello (Italian: [monaˈtʃɛlːo]), or Munaciello (Neapolitan: [munaˈtʃjelːə]), is a sprite from the traditional oral folklore of Naples, Italy.

Its name means "little monk" in the Neapolitan language. It gets often described as a "benevolent man, short, stocky, very spiteful" and enjoys visiting houses in the Historic center of Naples. It is thought to wear a long robe with a broad hood on top of it.

== Legend ==
Monaciello, the little monk, is a legendary figure from Naples, Italy. According to many tales, he was the caretaker (or "pozzari") of the city's underground aqueducts, canals, and water wells. Monaciello knew every twist and turn in these underground passages and could use the wells to secretly enter the piazzas and homes of Naples. After a long day, if he found himself in someone's apartment, he expected the residents to share their wine and food as a thank you for his important work. Most people appreciated Monaciello and generously offered what they had. However, if a family refused, Monaciello could become mean and spiteful, even returning later to steal their valuables.

Despite his mischievous nature—like stealing valuables and bothering housewives—Monaciello is mostly benevolent. In folklore, he is said to appear at night to those in desperate need, leading them to hidden treasures or giving them his own valuables, sometimes the same ones he had stolen, without asking for anything in return.

There's even a saying about unexpected fortune: "Forse avrà il Monaciello in casa" (perhaps he has had the little Monk in his house).

People also believed that offering food to Monaciello might turn into good fortune, but were careful not to boast about it lest the treasures disappear as quickly as they came.

== Related history ==
The habits of Monaciello resemble those of the water carriers of ancient Naples who worked in the numerous tunnels connecting the city's underground wells. The water carriers had to be short to pass through the tunnels, which gave them access to most houses, villas and Palazzos — wearing overalls that happen to resemble a monk's garments.

== In popular culture ==
- In 2024, a card game titled Munacello was published in the US, drawing on the rich folklore of the Monaciello as its central theme. The game captures the essence of the legend, challenging players to embrace cunning and agility to outwit their opponents and emerge victorious.
- In the book The King of Mulberry Street by Donna Jo Napoli, the character Dom (Beniamino), as well as his mother and grandmother, mention the Monaciello, saying he is a kind trickster and protector of children.
- In the 2021 film The Hand of God, the Little Monk appears as a young boy as opposed to a short, older man. Within the film he grants characters treasure and a moment of levity through his interaction.
- In the fifth season of the Italian TV series Gomorrah, the nickname of "Little Monk" is applied to a principal character of diminutive stature from central Naples.
