= Gomora =

Gomora may refer to:

- Gomora (moth), a genus of moths
- Gomora (TV series), a South African television series
- Gomora, a kaiju from the Ultra Series.

== See also ==
- Gomorrah (disambiguation)
