= Squasc =

Mythological creature

The squasc (pronounced [ˈskwaʃ]) is a mythological being of the Eastern Lombardy region folklore.

It is said to be small, hairy, tawny, similar to a squirrel without a tail, but with an anthropomorphic face.

Its nature is somehow between that of an evil spirit (assimilable to the boogeyman or Blackman) and that of an elf or imp. Like the former, the squasc is summoned to frighten children, but like the latter it loves playing jokes on people, particularly young girls.

== See also ==
- Goblin
- Gremlin
- Imp
- Kallikantzaros
- Kappa
- Lincoln Imp
- Mandragora (demon)
- Puck
