= Clusium =

Ancient city in Italy

Coordinates: 43.0167°N 11.9500°E

Clusium (Etruscan: Clevsin; Ancient Greek: Κλύσιον, Klýsion, or Κλούσιον, Kloúsion) was an ancient city in Italy, one of several found at the same site overlapping the current municipality of Chiusi (Tuscany). The Roman city remodeled an earlier Etruscan city, found in the territory of a prehistoric culture. The site is located in northern central Italy on the west side of the Apennines.

== Location ==
Chiusi is situated on a hill above the valley of the Clanis river near lake Clusium, both of which features had those names in antiquity. The Clanis is part of the Tiber drainage system and was navigable by boat from there. Rome was also accessed by the via Cassia, which was built over an Etruscan road.

The extent of the urban nucleus was limited when compared with the cities of the coast, and it has been argued that in pre-Roman times the population was dispersed across the territory rather than concentrated on the hill, with aristocratic families established outside the city and controlling wide stretches of land: a settlement pattern characteristic of northern Etruria and favoured by the agricultural basis of the local economy.

== Etruscan history ==
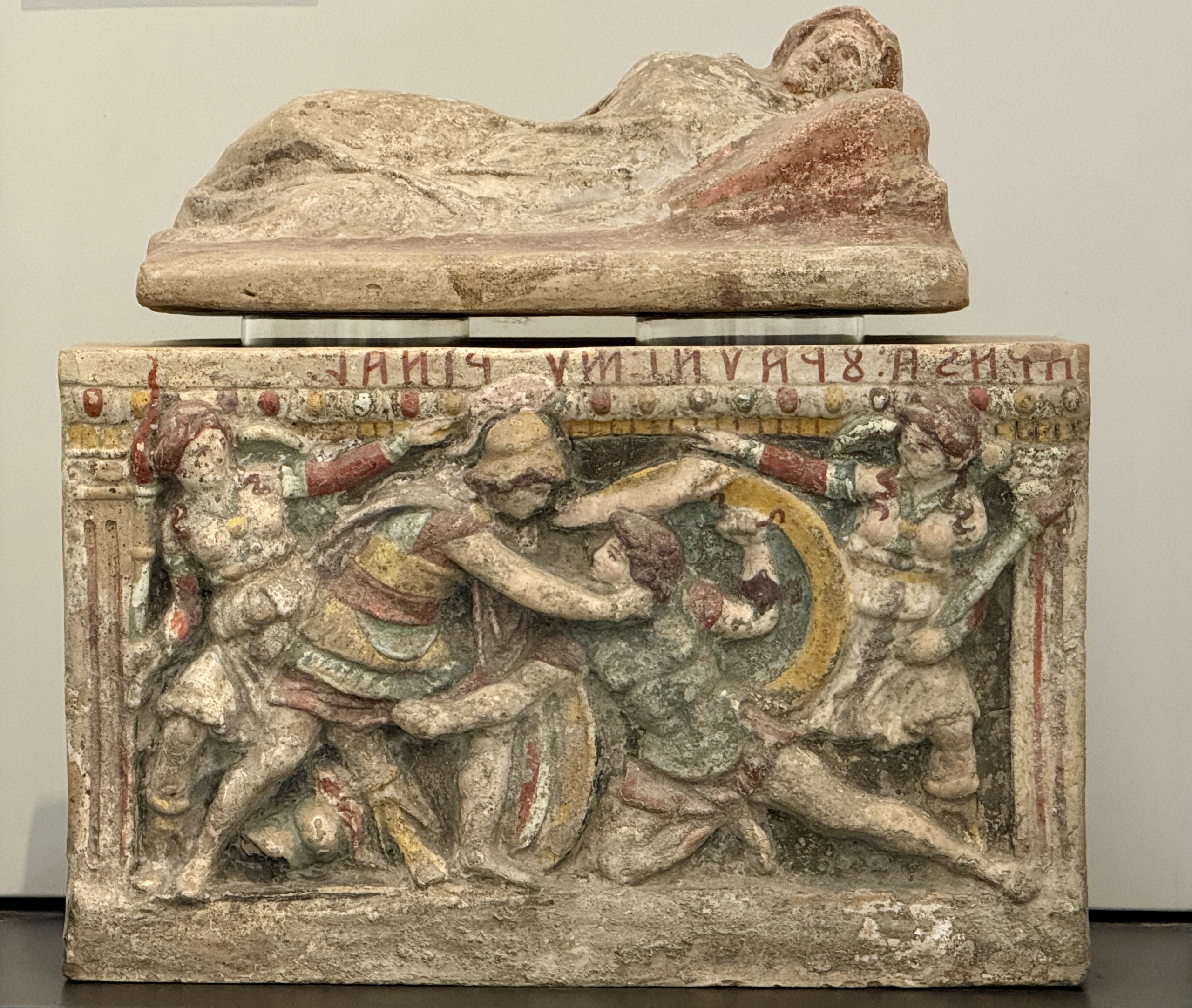
Found in Chiusi. 2nd century BCE. Terracotta. The relief depicts the duel between Eteocles and Polynices over the rule of Thebes.

By the time it appears in Livy's History, it is already a major Etruscan city being petitioned for assistance against the republican partisans of ancient Rome. About its life prior to that time, Livy only makes a brief statement that it was once called Camars.

Villanovan pottery has been found at Chiusi. One common type is a cinerary urn dating to the 8th century BC. These urns are in the shape of wattle-and-daub huts with thatched roofs, presumably the homes of the deceased. These hut urns belong to the Villanovan phase, now understood as the initial stage of Etruscan culture rather than as the expression of a distinct population. The protourban reorganization that began in Etruria during the tenth century BC shows no sign of external input: the migration of a new people, entertained by earlier scholarship, is rejected in view of the evident local cultural continuity between the Late Bronze Age and the Early Iron Age, while a determining role for Greek or Phoenician trade is unlikely, since there is no real evidence for a Greek presence in the West before the eighth century.

=== The name of the city ===
The Etruscan name of Clusium is not directly attested. What is documented is the adjectival form cleusinś ("Clusine"), which occurs on the foot of a black-gloss vessel of the third or second century BC found at Chiusi and, in the genitive clevsinsl, in the Golini I tomb at Orvieto, where a member of the Leinie family holds the title zilaθ mechl rasneas clevsinsl, the equivalent of Latin praetor rei publicae clusinae. From this adjective, and from the family names derived from it, a form *Cleusi is reconstructed for the Hellenistic period and *Cleusie for the age of Porsenna.

The second name recorded by Livy, Camars, may go back to a misreading of a passage of Polybius. A corresponding Etruscan toponym is in fact documented, but elsewhere: the locative kamarteθi appears in an archaic inscription of 525–500 BC from Saturnia, while no attestation is known from Chiusi or its territory.

Attempts to explain either name through Latin or Italic vocabulary are methodologically unsound, since Etruscan is a genealogically isolated language and derivations of Etruscan words from Latin, Italic, Greek or other families are regarded as illusory.

=== Ancient traditions concerning Etruscan origins ===
The city figures in the ancient debate on the origin of the Etruscans, a debate that modern scholarship has largely resumed in the same terms. Ancient authors already advanced opposing views: autochthony on the one hand, arrival by sea on the other, the latter in two distinct versions, the Lydian descent reported by Herodotus and the identification with the Pelasgians. These accounts are not independent records of historical events. The hostile portrayal of the Etruscans as pirates estranged from Hellenism reflects a Greek polemical tradition, probably Syracusan; the Lydian and Pelasgian versions are, by contrast, assertions of syngeneia, kinship claims to which it would be hazardous to assign any historical basis.

=== Porsenna ===
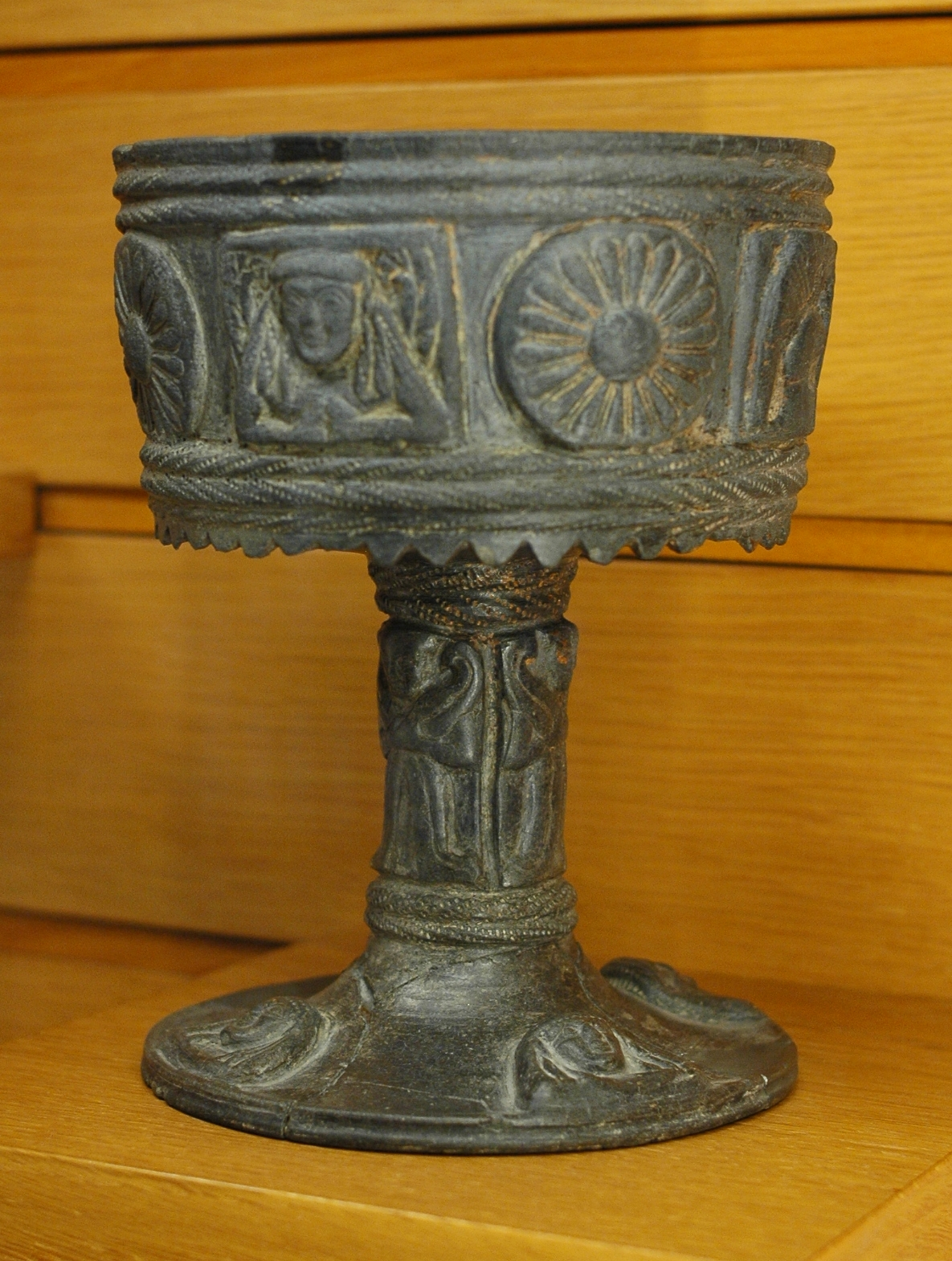
Bucchero Ware

Lars Porsena was king of Clusium in 508 BC. Lucius Tarquinius Superbus, formerly king of Rome, had been expelled along with his family from Rome in 509 BC. He had sought to regain the throne, firstly by the Tarquinian conspiracy and secondly by force of arms. Both attempts had been unsuccessful, the conspiracy having been discovered, and Tarquin's army having been defeated at the Battle of Silva Arsia.

Tarquin convinced Lars Porsena to lead his army against Rome. The war between Clusium and Rome followed, during which Porsena besieged Rome. The siege and the war ended with a peace treaty, by which Porsena received hostages from Rome and returned to Veii lands that had previously been taken by Rome. In 507 BC Rome's hostages and lands were restored, and peace between Rome and Porsena was cemented. Tarquinius was not restored to the Roman throne.

In 508 BC, after the siege of Rome, Porsena split his forces and sent part of the Clusian army with his son Aruns to besiege the Latin city of Aricia. The Clusians besieged Aricia; however the Aricians sent for assistance from the Latin League and from Cumae, and the Clusian army was defeated in battle.

Beyond its legendary elements, the historicity of the figure is now generally accepted. On the basis of a rereading of a passage of Pliny, an articulated titulature has been attributed to him, describing him as king of the Clusines, of the Volsinians and of the Etruscans, the three dignities having been acquired successively; to the same tradition belongs his character as a priest-king versed in the discipline of lightning.

Pliny the Elder wrote that a magnificent tomb was built for Porsena; a large mausoleum surrounded by cascades of pyramids over a labyrinth of underground chambers in which an intruder could get lost. Pliny never saw this tomb, so his description was based on a report from Varro, who attributed much of it to the fabulae Etruscae. Large-sized tumuli of the late archaic period were built at Chiusi, and modern scholars have associated these, especially Poggio Gaiella, with the legendary tomb.

In the early 4th century BC (391 BC according to Varronian chronology) it was besieged by Gauls, and the Clusines called upon Rome to intermediate. However, in the following negotiations, one of the Roman delegates, of the gens Fabia, killed a Gallic leader. When the Romans refused to hand over the Fabii and in fact appointed two members of the family as consuls for the next year, the enraged Gauls broke up their siege and under the leadership of Brennus they marched onto and subsequently sacked Rome.

== Roman history ==
At the time of the invasion of the Gauls in 391 BC, Clusium was on friendly terms with Rome. It was once thought that it was the action of the Roman envoys who had come to intercede for the people of Clusium with the Gauls, and then, contrary to international law, took part in the battle which followed, which determined the Gauls to march on Rome; whether this was true or not, the Gauls needed no real provocation. Near Clusium too, according to Livy, a battle occurred in 296 BC between the Gauls and Samnites combined, and the Romans; a little later the united forces of Clusium and Perusia were defeated by the Romans. In 205 BC, during the Second Punic War, the city promised ship timber and corn to Scipio Africanus.

The Via Cassia, constructed after 187 BC, passed just below the town. In Sulla's civil war, Papirius Carbo took up his position here, and two battles occurred in the neighbourhood. After the Social War the city was enrolled in the tribe Arniensis and, following the wars between Marius and Sulla, it received a Sullan military colony, to which the designation Clusini Novi, as opposed to Clusini Veteres, has been referred. The two communities are listed separately in Pliny's catalogue of the peoples of the seventh region. The phenomenon is not isolated: in the same list Arretium appears divided into three, as Arretini Veteres, Arretini Fidentiores and Arretini Iulienses. Such designations do not denote ethnic groups but sections of the citizen body distinguished by seniority and legal condition, the older citizens being flanked by groups of colonists settled at successive moments.

Between the later second and the early first century BC bell-shaped terracotta urns became common, inscribed with the name of the deceased in Etruscan and sometimes in Latin: a production that marks the transition from Etruscan to Roman culture. In imperial times little is heard of the town, though its grain and grapes were famous. Christianity found its way into Clusium as early as the 3rd century, and the tombstone of a bishop of AD 322 exists. In 540, it was named as a strong place to which the Ostrogothic king Vitiges sent a garrison of a thousand men.

== Archaeology ==
The site of ancient Clusium was reoccupied in Roman and later times, obscuring and obliterating much of the Etruscan layers. Of pre-Roman or Roman buildings in the town itself there are few remains, except for some fragments of the Etruscan town walls composed of rather small rectangular blocks of travertine, built into the medieval fortifications. Under the town extends an elaborate system of rock-cut passages, probably drains.

The chief interest of the place lies in its extensive necropolis, which surrounds the city on all sides. The earliest tombs (tombe a pozzo, shaft tombs) precede Greek importation. The next stage is marked by the so-called tombe a ziro, in which the cinerary urn, often with a human head, is placed in a large clay jar. These belong to the 7th century BC, and are followed by the tombe a camera, in which the tomb is a chamber hewn in the rock, traceable back to the beginning of the 6th century BC. The anthropomorphic urns of the earlier group, known as canopi, have generic features, sufficient to distinguish the sex and age of the deceased but not to constitute a portrait.

The François Vase was recovered in 1844–45 at Fonte Rotella near the grand-ducal farm of Dolciano, not far from Poggio Gaiella. The tomb of Poggio Renzo, or della Scimmia (the monkey), has several chambers decorated with archaic paintings. The most remarkable group of tombs is that of Poggio Gaiella, three miles to the north, where the hill is honeycombed with chambers on three levels, partly connected by a system of passages and supported at the base by a circular wall. With a diameter of about one hundred metres and a height of some fifteen, the mound is among the largest in Etruria, comparable to the Cuccumella of Vulci, and its dimensions approach those Varro assigned to the base of the royal tomb; its oldest nucleus is a corbelled chamber with a central pillar, assigned to the last quarter of the seventh century BC, and the complex remained in use into the second half of the second century BC. The identification with the labyrinth described by the ancient sources goes back to Emil Braun, who visited the excavation in 1840 and devoted a monograph to it. Surveys carried out in the 1990s established that the tunnels belong to the original design rather than to clandestine digging: they display the techniques used by the Etruscans in hydraulic and mining works, with advance from a single face, finished walls and niches for lamps blackened by smoke. On this basis a ritual function has been proposed for the complex, connected with the Etruscan word truia inscribed beside the labyrinth on the Tragliatella oinochoe.

Other noteworthy tombs are those of the Granduca, with a single subterranean chamber carefully constructed in travertine and containing eight sarcophagi of the same material; of Vigna Grande, very similar to this; of Colle Casuccini, the ancient stone door of which is still in working order, with two chambers containing paintings representing funeral rites; and of Poggio Moro and Valdacqua.

Excavation has since considerably widened the picture. The cemetery of Tolle, near Chianciano, investigated extensively between 1996 and 2011, has yielded more than a thousand burials ranging from the eighth to the second century BC, with frequent use of the anthropomorphic cinerary urn in the seventh and sixth centuries; examination of the human remains has allowed the sex and age at death of the deceased to be determined, revealing a substantial presence of infants. Work at the Arcisa, on the edge of the historic centre, revealed in 2020 uninterrupted occupation from the Early Iron Age onwards, including a cistern of the ninth century BC and two huts of the Orientalizing period in a sector formerly thought to lie outside the settlement.

In the Hellenistic period the family tombs of the Clusine countryside were progressively reorganized: when the rear chamber of an older tomb was full, side chambers and individual niches were opened along the corridor, holding small terracotta chests produced in series rather than individually modeled, so that inscriptions became necessary for identification. These burials have commonly been attributed to small farmers and freed serfs, but the Clusine aristocracy was in fact still prosperous, if less inclined to spend on funerary display, while new economic conditions made the lower social strata visible in the archaeological record: they proved as eager as the elite to leave an epigraphic memory of themselves.

A conception of the size of the whole necropolis may be gathered from the fact that nearly three thousand Etruscan inscriptions have come to light from Clusium and its district alone, while the part of Etruria north of it as far as the Arno has produced barely five hundred. Among the later tombs, bilingual inscriptions are by no means rare, and both Etruscan and Latin inscriptions are often found in the same cemeteries, showing that the use of the Etruscan language only died out gradually. A large number of the inscriptions are painted upon the tiles that closed the niches containing the cinerary urns. In Roman times, the territory of Clusium seems to have extended as far as Lake Trasimeno.

Two Christian catacombs were found near Clusium, one in the hill of Santa Caterina near the railway station, the inscriptions of which seem to go back to the 3rd century, another one mile to the east in a hill on which a church and monastery of St Mustiola stood, which goes back to the 4th century, including among its inscriptions one bearing the date 303, and the tombstone of L. Petronius Dexter, bishop of Clusium, who died in 322.

== Archaeogenetics ==
Human remains from the cemetery of Poggio Renzo, on the outskirts of the city, were included in the sample of the archaeogenomic study published in 2021, which analysed 82 individuals from twelve sites in Etruria and southern Italy between the eighth century BC and the tenth century AD. In Iron Age populations a component of steppe-related ancestry was identified, associated with the spread of the Indo-European languages and reaching the region during the Bronze Age, while no trace was found of recent Anatolian-related admixture. The Etruscan individuals share the genetic profile of the Latins of Rome, and the local gene pool remained substantially stable throughout the first millennium BC, changing markedly only in the Roman imperial period.

== See also ==
- Tomb of Lars Porsena
- François Vase

== Bibliography ==
- Agostiniani, Luciano (2013). "The Etruscan language". In Turfa, Jean MacIntosh (ed.). The Etruscan World. The Routledge Worlds. London: Routledge. pp. 457–477.
- Bischeri, Mattia (2022). "Immaginarsi dopo la morte. I canopi di Tolle alla luce dell'analisi dei resti umani e dei dati crono-spaziali". Mediterranea. Supplementi, nuova serie 2 (in Italian). Rome: CNR Edizioni. pp. 263–280.
- Briquel, Dominique (2013). "Etruscan origins and the ancient authors". In Turfa, Jean MacIntosh (ed.). The Etruscan World. The Routledge Worlds. London: Routledge. pp. 36–55.
- Camporeale, Giovannangelo (2015). Gli Etruschi. Storia e civiltà (in Italian) (4 ed.). Turin: UTET.
- Graditi, Roberto (2022). "Il labirinto di Poggio Gaiella e la Truia. Un'ipotesi interpretativa". Studi Etruschi (in Italian). 85: 111–147.
- Maggiani, Adriano (2019). "Chiusi (Cleusie), Orvieto (Velzna), due città, un solo Stato. L'iscrizione di Castelluccio la Foce". In Turchetti, Maria Angela (ed.). [Ri]scrivere il Passato. Il nome etrusco di Chiusi e altre storie (in Italian). pp. 18–21.
- Nielsen, Marjatta (2013). "The last Etruscans: family tombs in northern Etruria". In Turfa, Jean MacIntosh (ed.). The Etruscan World. The Routledge Worlds. London: Routledge. pp. 180–193.
- Nielsen, Erik O.; Warden, P. Gregory (2017). "Northern Etruria". In Naso, Alessandro (ed.). Etruscology. Berlin–Boston: De Gruyter. pp. 1299–1338.
- Pacciarelli, Marco (2017). "The transition from village communities to protourban societies". In Naso, Alessandro (ed.). Etruscology. Berlin–Boston: De Gruyter. pp. 561–571.
- Posth, Cosimo; Zaro, Valentina; Spyrou, Maria A.; et al. (2021). "The origin and legacy of the Etruscans through a 2000-year archeogenomic time transect". Science Advances. 7 (39). doi:10.1126/sciadv.abi7673. PMC 8462907.
- Stillwell, Richard, ed. (1976). The Princeton Encyclopedia of Classical Sites. Princeton: Princeton University Press.
- Tabolli, Jacopo; Bischeri, Mattia (2021). "Chiusi dalla prima età del Ferro all'Ellenismo: lo scavo dell'Arcisa". Mediterranea (in Italian). 18: 87–89.
- Turchetti, Maria Angela (2019). "Il nome etrusco di Chiusi: dalla Città al Nume tutelare". In Turchetti, Maria Angela (ed.). [Ri]scrivere il Passato. Il nome etrusco di Chiusi e altre storie (in Italian). pp. 6–8.
