= Sodom, Kentucky =

Sodom
- Ghost town
- Location within the state of Kentucky
- Coordinates: 38°10′21″N 84°42′24″W
- Country: United States
- State: Kentucky
- County: Woodford
- Elevation: 804 ft (245 m)
- Time zone: UTC-6 (Central (CST))
  - Summer (DST): UTC-5 (CST)
- GNIS feature ID: 2558250

Sodom is a ghost town in Woodford County, Kentucky, United States.

Sodom was located a few hundred yards downstream from Fishers Mill road were there was a covered bridge, built in 1810 and replaced in 1947. The town was established in 1825 by George and James Ware, but had vanished by 1880. At its peak, it was the second-largest city in Scott County (the largest being Georgetown). It had a population of 150, and included a cotton factory, hemp factory, tannery, shoe shop, carding machine, trading store, and a flour and grist mill. It is supposed that it was populated by many slaves that provided most of the labor. The town was named Sodom after the ancient city, because a tavern there owned by Richard Cole burned down in 1811.
