= Lonza (animal) =

Mythical wild cat

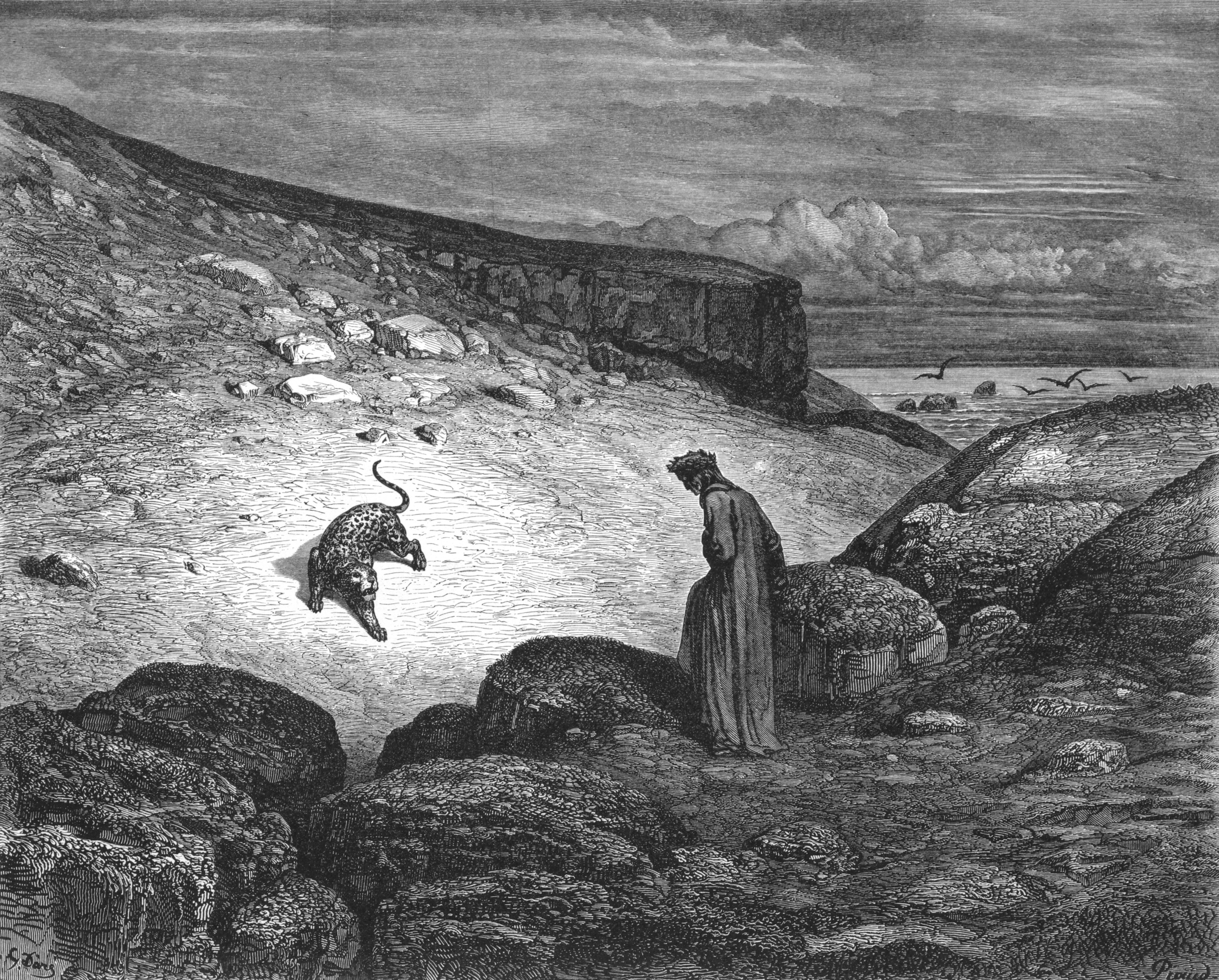
Dante meets the lonza, etching by Gustave Doré

The term lonza (from Latin lunceam, derived from lyncem, accusative of lynx), refers, in medieval Italian, to a wild feline, presumably the lynx or possibly the leopard. Its most notable mention is found in the Divine Comedy.

== In the Divine Comedy ==
Dante places it, along with the lion and the she-wolf, among the three beasts that block his path in the first canto of the Inferno (Divine Comedy I, vv. 31-60), as an allegory for three deadly sins. Ancient commentators identify the leopard as representing lust, which stands between Dante and the hill, attempting to drag him back into his sinful doubts. The interpretation linking it to a human vice—although not all agree on identifying it specifically as lust—appears to be the most valid and accepted one, considering that in medieval bestiaries the leopard was described as an animal perpetually in heat, mating in every season.

An ancient document mentions that a "lonza" or "leonza" was kept in a cage in the Municipality of Florence, perhaps giving Dante the idea to allegorically represent his city with this animal. In fact, the lion enclosure that Florence maintained behind Palazzo Vecchio, in what is now called Via dei Leoni, is well documented, and it is unclear why he did not use the lion itself, which he encounters shortly afterward in the canto, to symbolize his city.

In the 1966 film For Love and Gold, the protagonist in one scene narrates his youth saying: "Where I grew up, free and strong as a leopard."
