= Erchitu =

Legendary creature from Sardinia

The Erchitu is a legendary creature of Sardinian tradition.

According to the ancient legends of Sardinia, a man who committed a serious crime would turn on full moon nights into a white ox with two large horns. The creature stops in front of a house and bellows three times: his roar is heard by all the inhabitants of the country, and according to tradition, the master of the house will die within the year.

Sometimes it is accompanied by devils who lay two lit candles on its horns and prod it with hot skewers.

The Erchitos can free themselves from their torment only when they encounter someone brave and strong, capable of extinguishing the candles in one puff, or capable of cutting the horns on the head with one precise shot.
