= Sodom, Ohio =

Unincorporated community in Ohio, U.S.

Coordinates: 41°10′55″N 80°38′33″W

Sodom is an unincorporated community in Trumbull County, Ohio, United States.

== History ==
Sodom contained a post office from 1874 until 1903. The community was so named when a temperance activist, remarking on the small turnout at a lecture he delivered, jokingly compared the community to the infamous biblical city of Sodom.
