= Tomb of Lars Porsena =

Tomb of an Etruscan King in Italy

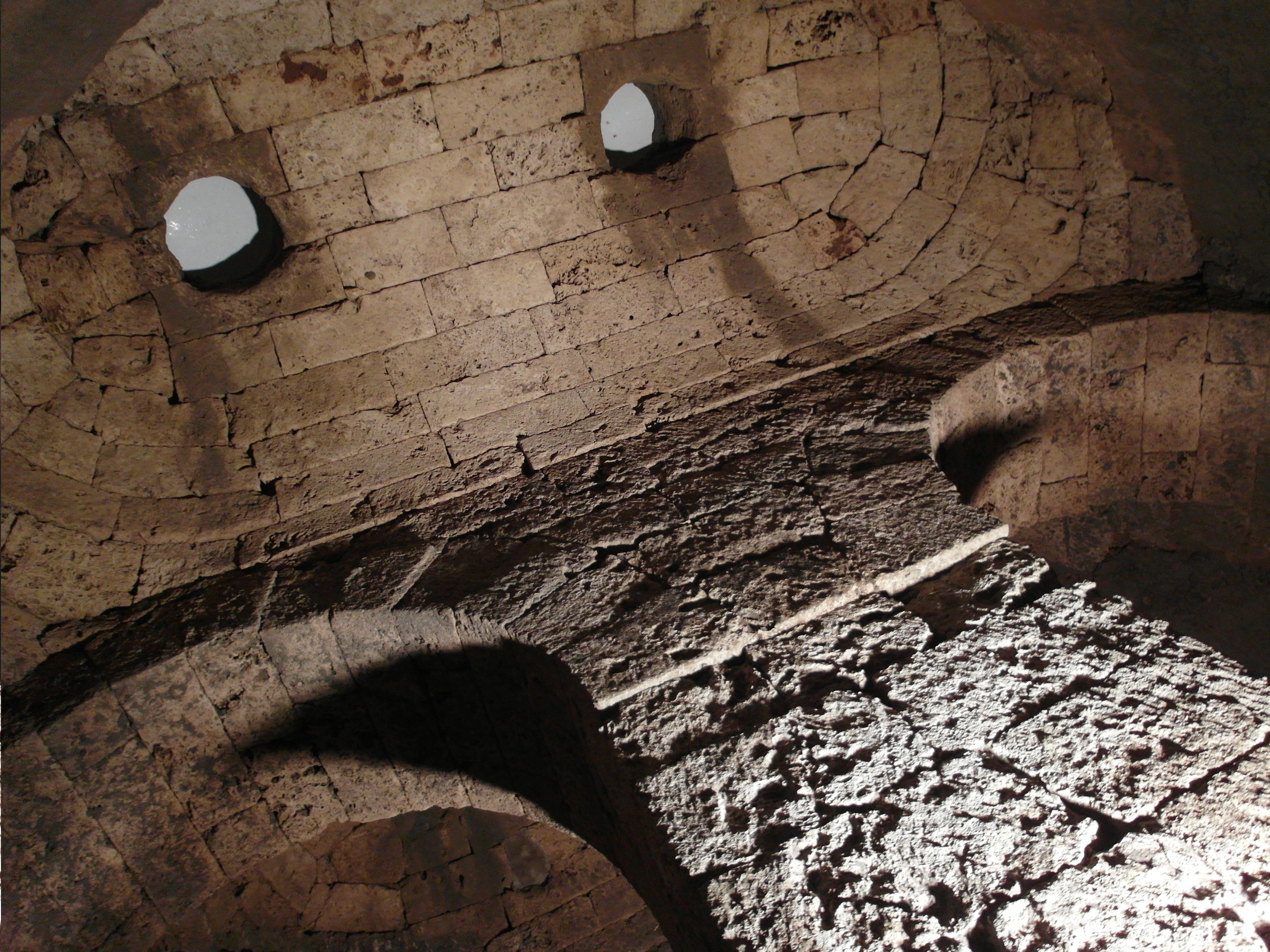
Etruscan-Roman reservoir in Chiusi, alleged Tomb of Lars Porsena

The tomb of the Etruscan king Lars Porsena (Italian: Mausoleo di Porsenna) is a legendary ancient building in what is now central Italy. Allegedly built around 500 BCE at Clusium (modern Chiusi, in south-eastern Tuscany), and was described as follows by the Roman writer Marcus Varro (116–27 BCE):

Porsena was buried below the city of Clusium in the place where he had built a square monument of dressed stones. Each side was three hundred feet in length and fifty in height, and beneath the base there was an inextricable labyrinth, into which, if any-body entered without a clue of thread, he could never discover his way out. Above this square building there stand five pyramids, one at each corner and one in the centre, seventy-five feet [c. 22 meters] broad at the base and one hundred and fifty feet [c. 44 meters] high. These pyramids so taper in shape that upon the top of all of them together there is supported a brazen globe, and upon that again a petasus from which bells are suspended by chains. These make a tinkling sound when blown about by the wind, as was done in bygone times at Dodona. Upon this globe there are four more pyramids, each a hundred feet [c. 30 meters] in height, and above them is a platform on which are five more pyramids.

== Destruction of the tomb ==
This structure, standing some 200 meters high, was supposedly destroyed along with Clusium itself in 89 BCE by the Roman general Cornelius Sulla. No trace of it has ever been found, and historians have generally regarded Varro’s account as a gross exaggeration at best, and downright fabrication at worst.

In the 18th century Angelo Cortenovis proposed that the tomb of Lars Porsena was a machine for conducting lightning.

== Gallery ==
Artist reconstructions
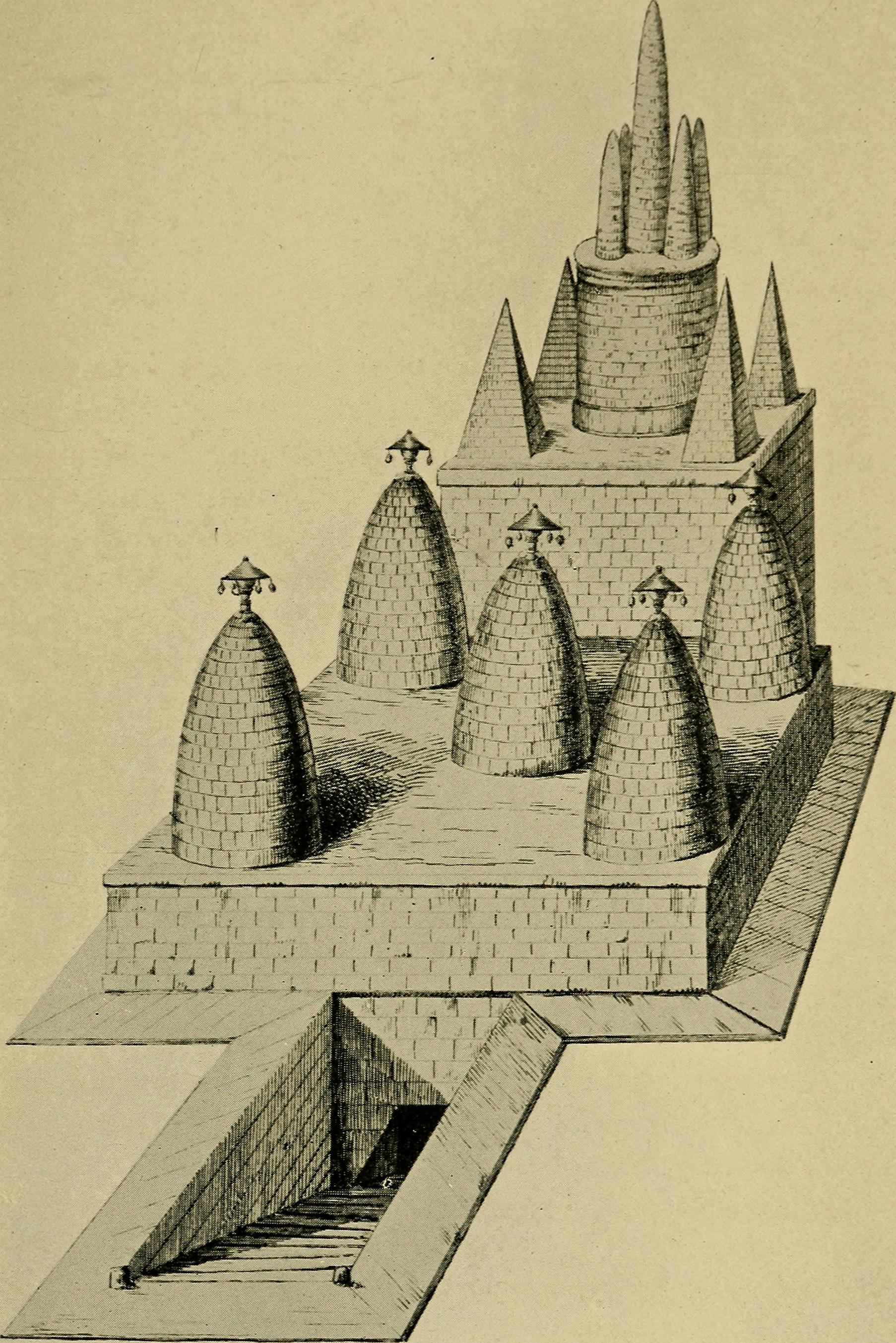
Conjectural restoration by Quatremere de Quincy after Varro's description. From Mazes and labyrinths; a general account of their history and developments (1922).
