= Gomorrah =

Gomorrah or Gomorra may refer to:

- Sodom and Gomorrah, Biblical cities
- Gomorrah (book), a 2006 non-fiction investigative book by Roberto Saviano
  - Gomorrah (film), based on the book
  - Gomorrah (TV series), based on the book
- Operation Gomorrah, the Bombing of Hamburg in World War II in July 1943
- Liber Gomorrhianus or Book of Gomorrah, a book written by Peter Damian
- Gomorra (EP), a 1994 EP by Wumpscut
- Gomorrah, a fictional casino within the video game Fallout: New Vegas

== See also ==
- Sodom and Gomorrah (disambiguation)
- Gomora (disambiguation)
