= Egg of Columbus (disambiguation) =

The Egg of Columbus is an apocryphal story about Christopher Columbus. It may also refer to:

- Egg of Columbus (mechanical puzzle)
- Egg of Columbus (tangram puzzle)
- Tesla's Egg of Columbus
- Birth of a New Man, statue in Seville also known as Egg of Columbus
