= Donna Henes =

American artist, urban shaman and speaker (1945–2024)

- Born: Donna Susan Trugman; September 19, 1945; Cleveland, Ohio, U.S.
- Died: September 21, 2024 (aged 79); Ossining, New York, U.S.
- Education: City College of New York
- Occupations: Urban shaman; artist; writer
- Spouse: Robert Henes (divorced)
- Partner: Daile Kaplan (1981–2024; Henes' death)

Donna Susan Henes (née Trugman; September 19, 1945 – September 21, 2024) was an American artist, urban shaman, ritual expert and consultant, speaker, and writer.

== Background ==
Donna Trugman was born to a Jewish family in Cleveland on September 19, 1945. She moved to New York and earned bachelor's and master's degrees from the City College of New York. Around this time, she married Robert Henes, though they soon divorced.

== Career ==
Beginning in 1972, Henes – known as Mama Donna – designed and led multi-cultural, non-denominational celebrations to mark the passage of seasons, using ancient, traditional rituals and contemporary ceremonies. She performed outdoor equinox and solstice celebrations throughout New York City, including an annual "Eggs on End" ceremony, and led similar celebrations in more than 100 other cities throughout the United States, Canada and Europe. In 1984, she received a Mayoral Citation from New York City Mayor Ed Koch for designing the New York City Olympic Ticker Tape Parade and a Mayoral Citation from New York City Mayor David Dinkins in the early 1990s for her work as Shaman in the Streets.

Henes served as children's book award judge for the United Nations Jane Addams Peace Association from 1980-1988. She taught in New York's schools and performed rituals at various public and private settings. For 18 years, until the 9/11 attacks in 2001 when the events could no longer be held, The Port Authority of New York and The Lower Manhattan Cultural Council supported Henes' production of her Celestially Auspicious Occasions. In 1998, after Henes led a celebration of the Winter Solstice on a beach in Staten Island, she and a few dozen fellow observers there were arrested for trespassing because they did not have a permit; the charges were later dismissed.

In 2005, she published The Queen of My Self: Stepping Into Sovereignty in Midlife (Monarch Press 2005). She has also written three others, The Moon Watcher's Companion (Marlowe & Co. 2004); Celestially Auspicious Occasions: Seasons, Cycles and Celebrations (Perigree: Penguin/Putnam 1996); and Dressing Our Wounds In Warm Clothes (Astro Artz 1982); as well as a quarterly journal, Always In Season: Living in Sync with the Cycles.

She published a monthly Ezine, The Queen's Chronicles and also wrote columns for The Huffington Post, Beliefnet and UPI's (United Press International) Religion and Spirituality Forum. Her writings for adults and children have been syndicated in publications throughout the United States and Canada, and globally on the Internet.

In 2007, Henes was chosen to bless and lead New York's Village Halloween Parade, which is held annually in New York City's Greenwich Village.

She was a recipient of four fellowships from the New York Foundation for the Arts and the National Endowment for the Arts, as well as numerous project grants from municipalities, corporations and foundations.

Henes maintained a ceremonial center, ritual practice and consultancy in Brooklyn, New York, Mama Donna's Tea Garden and Healing Haven, where she worked with individuals and groups to create personalized rituals for all of life's transitions.

== Personal life and death ==
In 1981, Henes began a relationship with Daile Kaplan, and they registered a domestic partnership in 2002.

Henes suffered a fall in 2021 that began a decline in her health, and she died at a rehabilitation hospital in Ossining, New York, on September 21, 2024, at the age of 79.

== Sources ==
- Daily News (New York)|Daily News, April 16, 1996
- The Village Voice, February 3, 1998
- Mayoral Citation - December 4, 1989
- Mayoral Citation - August 23, 1984
