= Egg of Columbus (mechanical puzzle) =

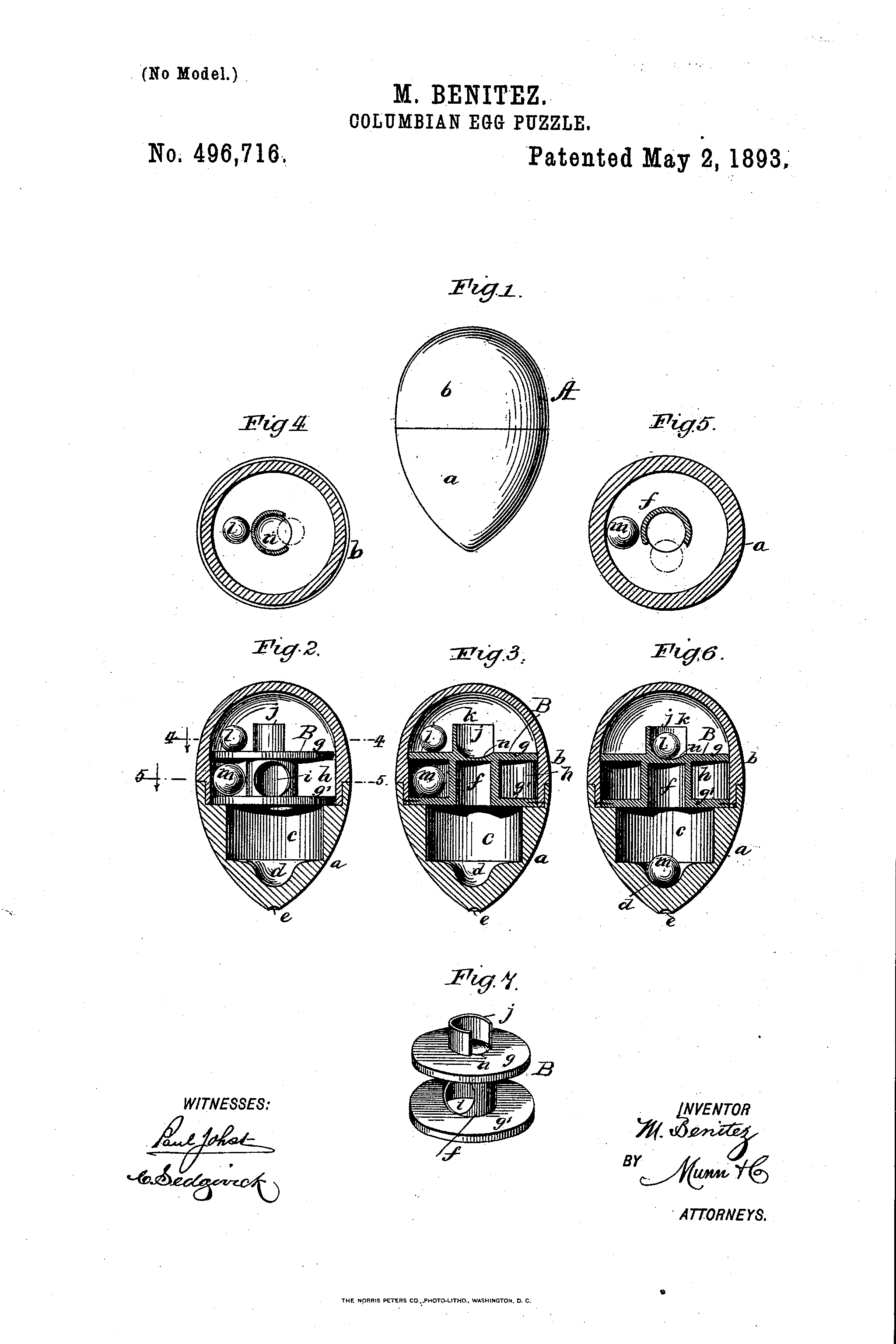
US496716A patent drawing showing the mechanism of an Egg of Columbus puzzle

The names Egg of Columbus and Columbus Egg have been used for several mechanical toys and puzzles inspired on the legend of Columbus balancing an egg on its end to drive a point. Typically, these puzzles are egg-shaped objects with internal mechanisms that make the egg stand up, once the user discovers the secret.

Mechanisms typically used in such toys include moving weights, mercury flowing in sealed tubes or compartments, and steel balls rolling on grooves and pits.

== History ==
A Columbus Egg puzzle using a rolling ball was described in an 1893 book. The Montgomery Ward catalog of 1894 includes a "Columbus Egg" toy.

There are at least 18 United States patents for such devices, starting from 1891.

The German company Pussycat sells a Columbus Egg that can be balanced by holding it upright for 25 seconds, then quickly inverting it. The egg will then stand on its pointed end for 15 seconds, then topple on its side.

== See also ==
- Egg of Columbus (tangram puzzle)
- Egg of Li Chun
- Superegg
- Tesla's Egg of Columbus
