= Columbus Breaking the Egg =

Print by William Hogarth

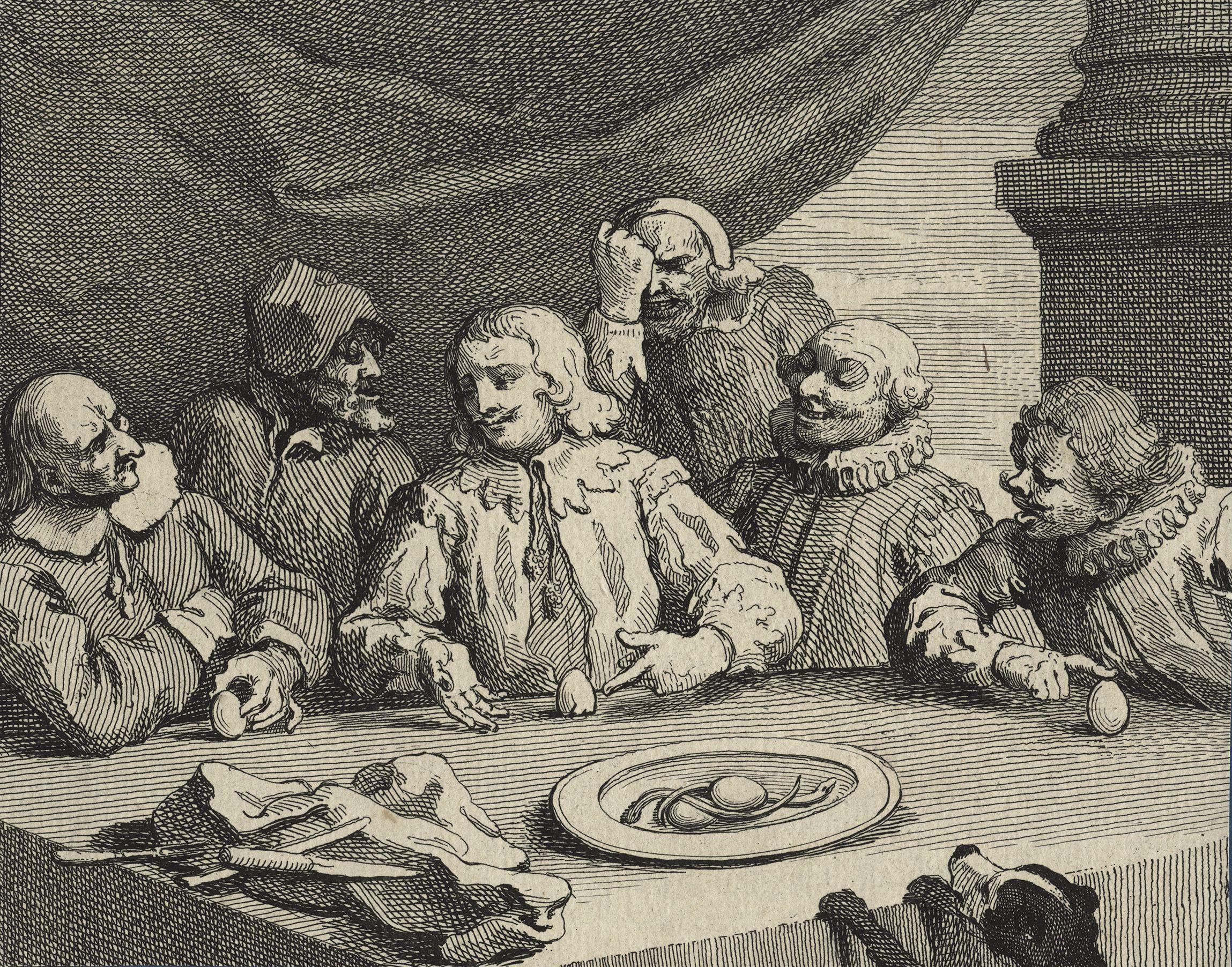
- Artist: William Hogarth
- Year: 1752
- Type: Engraving

Columbus Breaking the Egg is a 1752 engraving by English artist William Hogarth. Issued as the subscription ticket for his treatise on art, The Analysis of Beauty, it depicts an apocryphal tale (the "Egg of Columbus") concerning Christopher Columbus's response to detractors of his discovery of the New World. Hogarth uses the story as a parallel to what he considered his own discoveries in art.

== Story ==
The tale of the "Egg of Columbus" is apocryphal and was ascribed to Filippo Brunelleschi with regard to the construction of the dome of the Duomo in Florence before it was related pertaining to Columbus. The story told by Girolamo Benzoni in his Historia del Mondo Nuovo of 1565 was that at a meal several of Columbus's detractors began to comment that any number of other people could have found their way to the New World and that Columbus's feat was unremarkable because of its simplicity. Columbus replied that it was only easy now that he had demonstrated how it was done, and by way of an example, he challenged anyone present to stand an egg on its end. After all those attempting the feat had admitted defeat Columbus demonstrated the simplicity of the challenge by crushing one end of the egg against the table which allowed it to remain upright.

== Print ==
Hogarth's print was issued in April 1752 as the subscription ticket for his forthcoming book on art The Analysis of Beauty. Various copies of the ticket are extant, some of which are held by the British Museum, Fitzwilliam Museum and the Hunterian Museum. The print shows Columbus having just demonstrated the method for making the egg stay upright. His audience look on in amazement and one man behind him beats his forehead in frustration at the simplicity of the solution. At either end of the table are men caught still in the act of attempting to balance eggs.

Below the print is the following text:

Rec'd ... of ... five Shillings being the first Payment for a Short Tract in Quarto call'd the Analysis of Beauty; wherin Forms are consider'd in a new light, to which will be added two explanatory Prints Serios and Comical Engrav'd on large Copper Plates fit to frame for Furniture.

A small note informing the reader that the price will be raised once the subscription is over is added alongside Hogarth's signature. The price for the Analysis was ten shillings: five shillings on subscription and five shillings on delivery, with the price rising to fifteen shillings for those purchasing once the subscription period had finished.

While simply executed with no great attention to detail or fineness of engraving, the ticket served a satirical purpose. Hogarth expected much the same reaction to his book as Columbus had received. Hogarth considered that he too had discovered a "New World", but one with the sphere of art rather than geography, and just as Columbus's detractors had mocked the navigator's accomplishment as simple and inevitable, Hogarth expected the art connoisseurs to mock his thesis on the serpentine "Line of Beauty" as self-evident and unimaginative. According to Trusler, Hogarth was correct in his assumption:

In the print of Columbus there is evident reference to the criticisms on what Hogarth called his own discovery and in truth the connoisseurs remarks on the painter were dictated by a similar spirit to those of the critics on the navigator they first asserted there was no such line, and when he had proved that there was, gave the honour of discovery to Lomazzo, Michael Angelo, &c &c.

To strengthen the connection between himself and the Columbus of the tale he included two eels in a bowl in the centre of the table their bodies demonstrating the "Line of Beauty" as they coiled around a pair of eggs. Trusler sees a further example of Hogarth's serpentine line in the twisted tablecloth and a hint of it in the knife blade. To further underline the ironic nature of the print the composition is based on Da Vinci's The Last Supper, with the bowl containing the eels and eggs replacing the Host. Hogarth expert, Ronald Paulson also sees echoes of Hogarth's early picture of Sancho's Feast (which was probably produced in the 1720s) and connections to the final plate of A Harlot's Progress where the body of Moll Hackabout takes the role of the Host. Another of Hogarth's ideas on the nature of Beauty is also illustrated: the ugly, coarse, common, "lower class" attributes are given to Columbus's critics while Columbus himself is portrayed with the refined lines of the nobility—Hogarth proposed that ugliness arose where "beauty seems to submit, in some degree, to use", but here, as in many of his images, the inner qualities are reflected in the outward appearances.

== History ==
The print was produced in a single state, although there are variations on the printing. The British Museum has a number of copies of the subscription ticket, made out to various subscribers, and an example of a later version, which lacked the subscription information but had the addition of "Design'd and Etch'd by W^{m} Hogarth Decem 1. 1753." below the image, survives in the Hunterian Museum. The unannotated version is believed to have been used as a frontispiece for some copies of the Analysis of Beauty. In 1754, Hogarth was advertising separate copies of Columbus Breaking the Egg for one shilling. Unusually, the original copperplate survived World War I when many of Hogarth's plates were scrapped to produce material for munitions and aircraft. Quaritch, the owner of a large number of Hogarth's original plates, donated many to the Government to help the war effort, but the plate of Columbus Breaking the Egg was sold to Charles Scribner's Sons in 1921 and later sold on to a private collector. The Royal Library has an unfinished version of the scene, which Nichols believed to be a proof, but Paulson dismisses as an "extremely cunning copy ... left unfinished or purposely made to resemble an unfinished proof."

== See also ==
- List of works by William Hogarth

== Sources ==
- Bindman, David (1997). Hogarth and His Times: Serious Comedy. University of California Press. ISBN 0520213009.
- Hogarth, William (1753). The Analysis of Beauty. London.
- Nichols, John (1785). Biographical Anecdotes of William Hogarth: With a Catalogue of His Works. London: J.B. Nichols and Son.
- Paulson, Ronald (1989). Hogarth's Graphic Works. London: The Print Room. ISBN 0951480804.
- Paulson, Ronald (1993). Hogarth: Art and Politics, 1750–64 Vol 3. Lutterworth Press. ISBN 0718828755.
- Paulson, Ronald (1998). Don Quixote in England:The Aesthetics of Laughter. Johns Hopkins University Press. ISBN 0801856957.
- Paulson, Ronald (2003). Hogarth's "Harlot": Sacred Parody in Enlightenment England. Johns Hopkins University Press. p. 424. ISBN 0801873916.
- Trusler, John (1833). The Works of William Hogarth. London: Jones and Co.
- Uglow, Jenny (1997). Hogarth: A life and a world. New York: Farrar Straus Giroux. ISBN 0374528519.
