= Tesla's Egg of Columbus =

Device to help explain alternating current induction motors

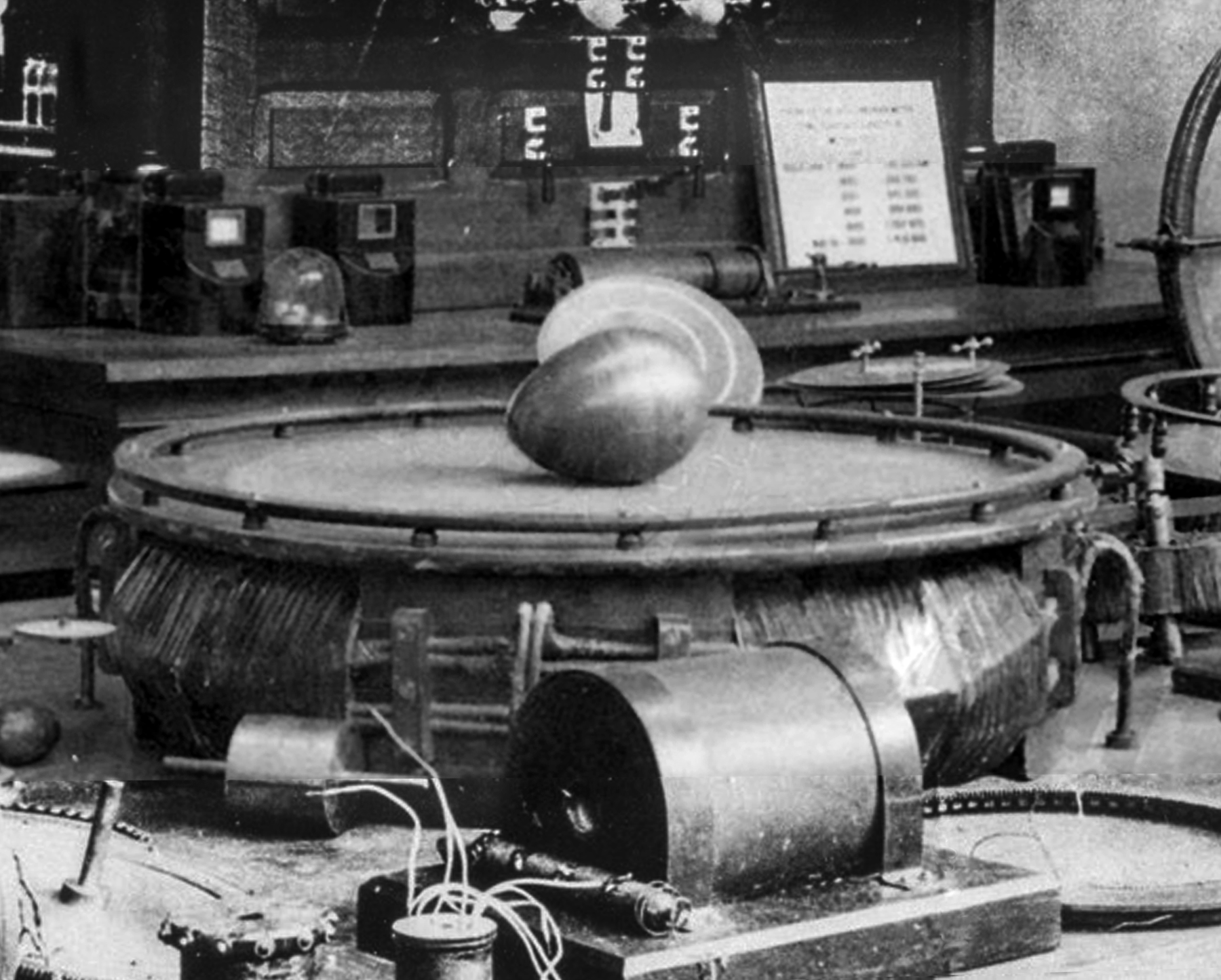
"Egg of Columbus" demonstration at the 1893 Columbian Exposition

Tesla's Egg of Columbus was a device exhibited in the Westinghouse Electric display at the 1893 Chicago World's Columbian Exposition to explain the rotating magnetic field that drove the new alternating current induction motors designed by inventor Nikola Tesla by using that magnetic field to spin a copper egg on end.

== Origins ==
At the 1893 World's Columbian Exposition Westinghouse Electric (who had a large space in the "Electricity Building" devoted to their electrical exhibits) asked Tesla to participate and gave his devices their own exhibit space. The display demonstrated a series of electrical effects related to alternating current, AC generators, and displayed many types of induction motors and explained the rotating magnetic field that drove them.

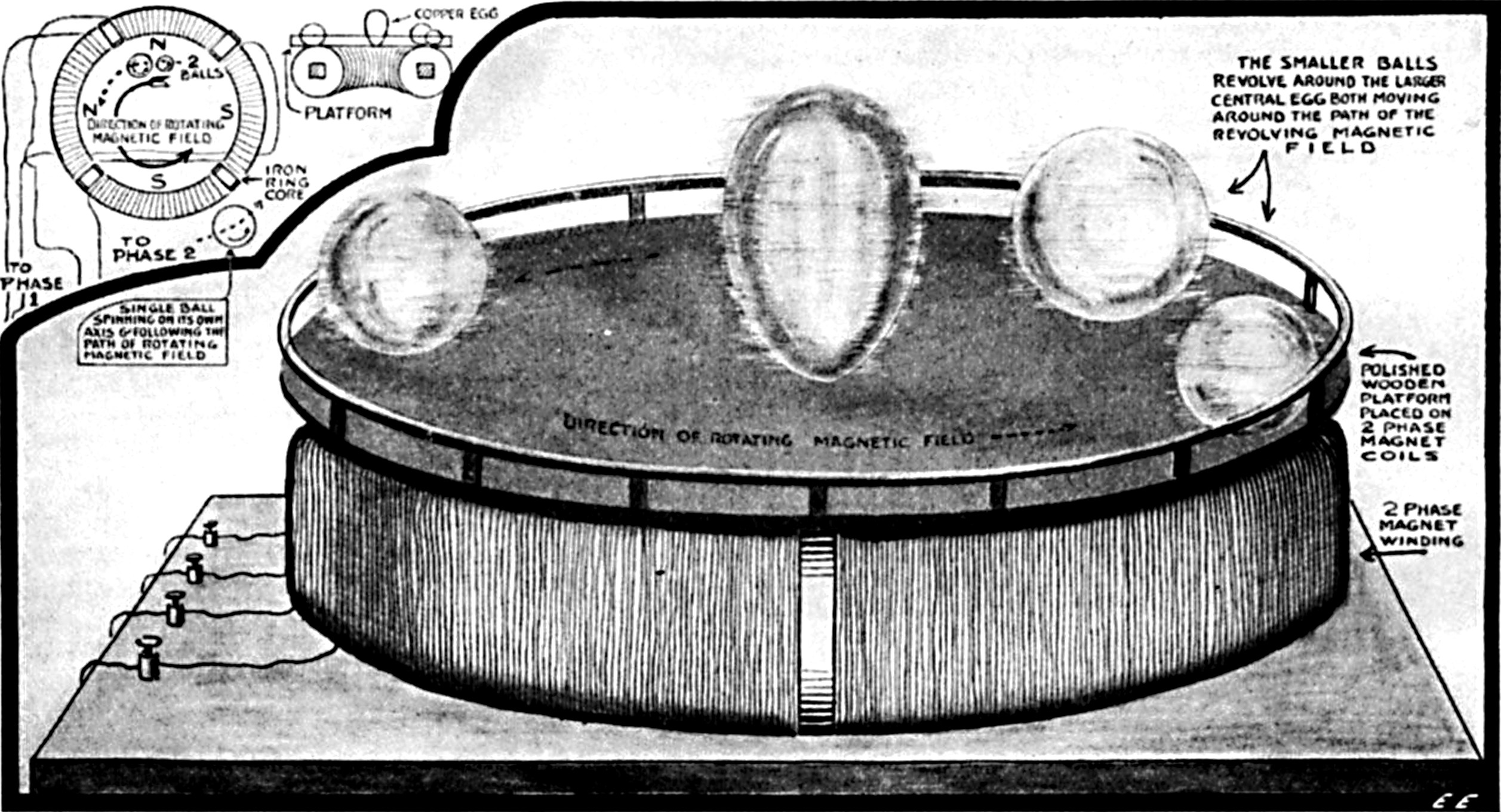
Drawing from the 1919 ELECTRICAL EXPERIMENTER explaining how Nikola Tesla's "Egg of Columbus" worked

With the fair celebrating the 400th anniversary of Christopher Columbus's arrival in the New World, the "Egg of Columbus" exhibit, building on the apocryphal 15th century story of the "Egg of Columbus" (where the explorer stood an egg on end by smashing its bottom), is described as going "one better" by using a magnetic field to stand an egg on end. It presented the viewer with a flat round wooden surface surrounded by a wooden rim. Inside this rim it performed Christopher Columbus's feat by spinning a copper egg, larger than an ostrich egg, in a rotating magnetic field causing it to stand on end on its major axis due to gyroscopic action. The display also included round copper balls that seemed to orbit around the edge similar to the way planets move. Whenever the large rotating magnetic field set up by the Egg of Columbus was turned on it impressed the public by spinning various magnetized metal balls and painted metal disks on the display table and even small disks inside vacuum bulbs placed at some distance around the Electricity Building.

Underneath what the public saw was a toroidal iron core stator on which four electromagnetic coils were wound. The device was powered by a two-phase alternating current source (such as a variable speed alternator) to create the rotating magnetic field. The device operated on a frequency of 25 to 300 hertz. The ideal operating frequency was described as being between 35 and 40 hertz.

The device has been described as being built by Westinghouse engineer Charles F. Scott, who was in charge of development of the induction motor for the company, although a March 1919 Electrical Experimenter article claimed it was built by Westinghouse Electric Superintendent Albert Schmid.

The Columbian Exposition "Egg of Columbus" ended up at Tesla's 46 & 48 East Houston Street New York City laboratory where he would demonstrate it to visitors. Margaret Cheney's 1981 book Tesla: Man Out of Time says that after Tesla's death the device was sent to Yugoslavia in 1952 along with many other Tesla papers, models and artifacts, becoming part of the collection at the Nikola Tesla Museum in Belgrade although her later 1999 book Tesla: Master of Lightning seems to indicate that the museum has only a smaller copy.

=== Alternative origin ===
An alternative origin for Tesla's "Egg of Columbus" was told by Nikola Tesla himself to the editors of Electrical Experimenter and published in their March, 1919 article "How Tesla Performed the Feat of Columbus Without Cracking the Egg". In this version the year of invention was 1887 when "He had approached a Wall Street capitalist — a prominent lawyer — with a view of getting financial support and this gentleman called in a friend of his, a well-known engineer at the head of one of the big corporations in New York, to pass upon the merits of the scheme". At that time these would have been Charles F. Peck and Alfred S. Brown, Tesla's financial backers and partners in the Tesla Electric Company. Tesla's story has him convincing these men that a rotating magnetic field AC induction motor would be a feasible invention worth developing via building the "Egg of Columbus" the next day and demonstrating it to them.

== Reproductions ==
Reproductions of the device are displayed at the Nikola Tesla Museum in Belgrade, the Memorial Centre "Nikola Tesla" in Smiljan, the Technical Museum in Zagreb, the Croatian History Museum in Zagreb, in the Ampère Museum in Lyon, France, in the Ann Arbor Hands-On Museum in Ann Arbor, MI, and the Tesla Science Center at Wardenclyffe in Shoreham, NY.
