= Egg balancing =

Practice of standing eggs on their ends

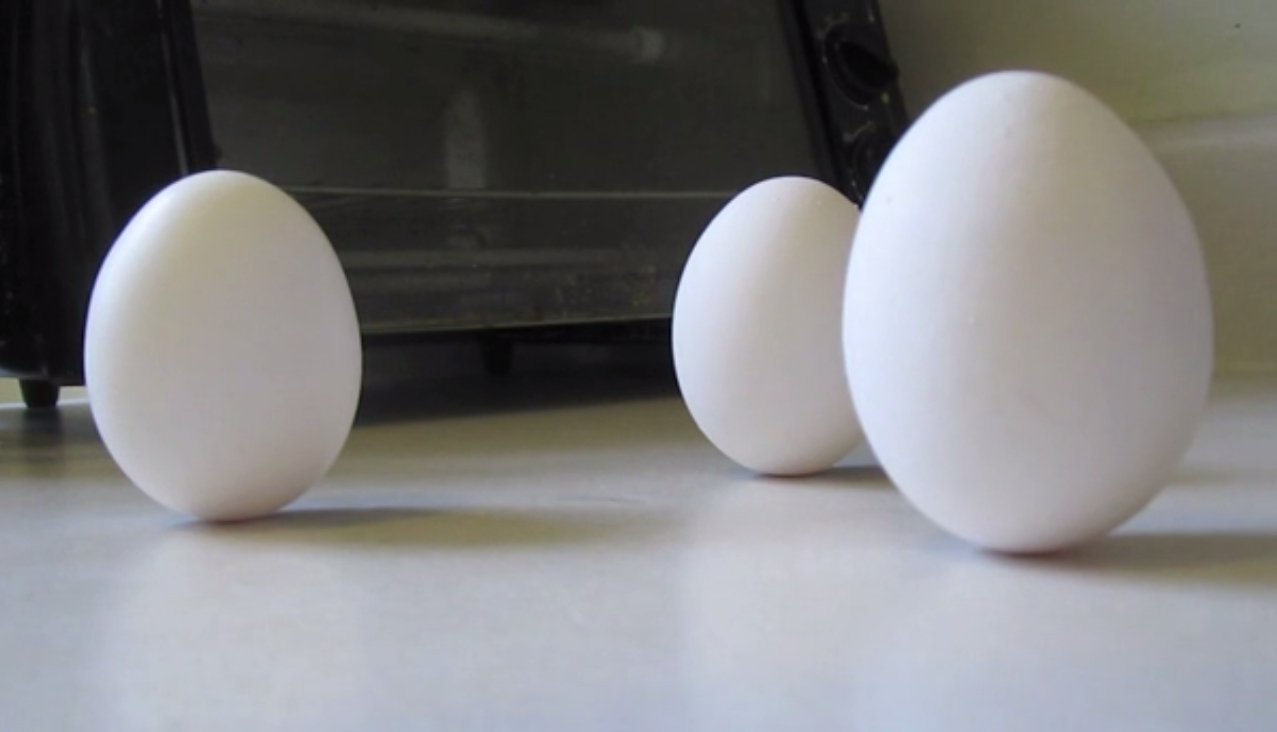
Eggs balanced on a flat surface

Egg balancing is a traditional Chinese practice of standing eggs on their ends. Although the irregular shape of eggs makes this somewhat difficult, eggshells typically have many textural variations such that the vast majority can be balanced on their broad ends with minimal effort. The practice has also been popularized in the United States.

Folklore holds that eggs can be balanced in this way only at a particular time of year: the lunar new year in (mainland) China, the Dragon Boat Festival in Taiwan, or the vernal equinox in the United States. It is also said that eggs can be balanced on the heads of nails at the equator. In reality, eggs will balance anywhere at any time of year, and the practice has no connection to the gravitational force of the moon or sun.

== History ==
=== Lichun egg ===
Egg balancing has been connected with Lichun, the solar term beginning Chinese spring (春) on February 4 or 5 when the sun is at the celestial longitude of 315°. On this day, fresh chicken eggs were balanced on their broad end. In Taiwan, the practice is sometimes connected with the Dragon Boat Festival instead, on the fifth day of the fifth lunar month.

=== United States ===
A 1945 Life article reported on "an egg-balancing craze" among the population of Chongqing (the interim capital of China during World War II) on that year's Lichun. That article and subsequent followings-up started a similar egg-balancing craze in the United States, but transposed to the vernal equinox beginning Western spring on March 20 or 21 when the sun is at the celestial longitude of 0°. The idea that an egg is easier to balance on the spring equinox has since become an American urban legend, and egg-balancing events are sometimes held on that date. In 1976, New York artist Donna Henes started organizing egg-balancing ceremonies with the stated goal of bringing about world peace and international harmony. These events, which often drew thousands of people, are still held annually by Henes in New York City.

== Science ==
The balancing of most eggs on their broad ends is not particularly difficult at any time of the year. No physical influence of other celestial bodies on the egg can affect its balance to the extent required by the folk belief. Gravitational and electromagnetic forces, in particular, are considerably weaker and steadier than the disturbances created by the person's breathing and heartbeat.

In 1947, after Japanese newspapers picked up the story, the physicist Ukichiro Nakaya verified experimentally that eggs can be balanced with ease at any time of the year. He noticed that an eggshell usually has many small bumps and dimples so that, by turning the egg in different directions, it can be made to touch a flat surface on three points at the same time in many ways. It is not hard to find an orientation such that the egg's center of mass is contained within the triangle spanned by the three contact points, which is the condition for balancing any object. His findings were replicated by astronomer Frank D. Ghigo of the University of Minnesota in 1984.

Writing on the subject, Martin Gardner speculated that the folk beliefs inspired people to "try a little harder, be more patient, and use steadier hands" and possibly even to subconsciously sabotage attempts on other days. He compared the self-reinforcing delusion to a "ouija-board phenomenon".

== See also ==
- Egg of Columbus (mechanical puzzle)
- Egg of Columbus
- Easter egg
- Superegg
- "Evidence of Things Not Seen", an episode of The West Wing featuring the American vernal equinox tradition
