= Tesla: Man Out of Time =

- Author: Margaret Cheney
- Language: English
- Publisher: Prentice Hall
- Publication date: November 11, 1981
- Pages: 320 pages
- ISBN: 9780-139068591
- OCLC: 7672251
- Dewey Decimal: 621.3/092/4B 19
- LC Class: TK140.T4 C47

Tesla: Man Out of Time (ISBN 0139068597) is a 1981 biography of Nikola Tesla by Margaret Cheney. The book describes the life of Nikola Tesla (1856–1943), the Serbian-American inventor. Margaret Cheney's narrative details Tesla's childhood during the 1850s and 1860s in the then Austro-Hungarian Empire, his 1884 arrival in New York, becoming an American citizen in 1891, his inventions and contributions to engineering, up to his death New York at age 86 during the middle of World War II in 1943. The book is focused largely on Tesla's personality and not his inventions.

== Reception ==
Writing in The Boston Phoenix, David Solomon noted that Cheney "gives little credence to the visionary dimension of Tesla’s work," "misses the obvious connection between Tesla’s repeated fleecings at the hands of businessmen and scientists alike, and "dismisses Tesla’s lifelong commitment to social utopianism and his resistance to commercialization." "Likewise, Cheney’s treatment of Tesla’s most controversial project — known as the Colorado Experiments — is unduly critical." Nevertheless, Solomon concluded that "Although Man Out of Time lacks a satisfying analytical perspective, it is nevertheless an important book, simply because we are in danger of forgetting Nikola Tesla. It is especially significant in being the first book to recall the mystery and promise of Tesla’s work during this era of energy crisis.
