= Egg of Columbus =

16th-century anecdote about hindsight

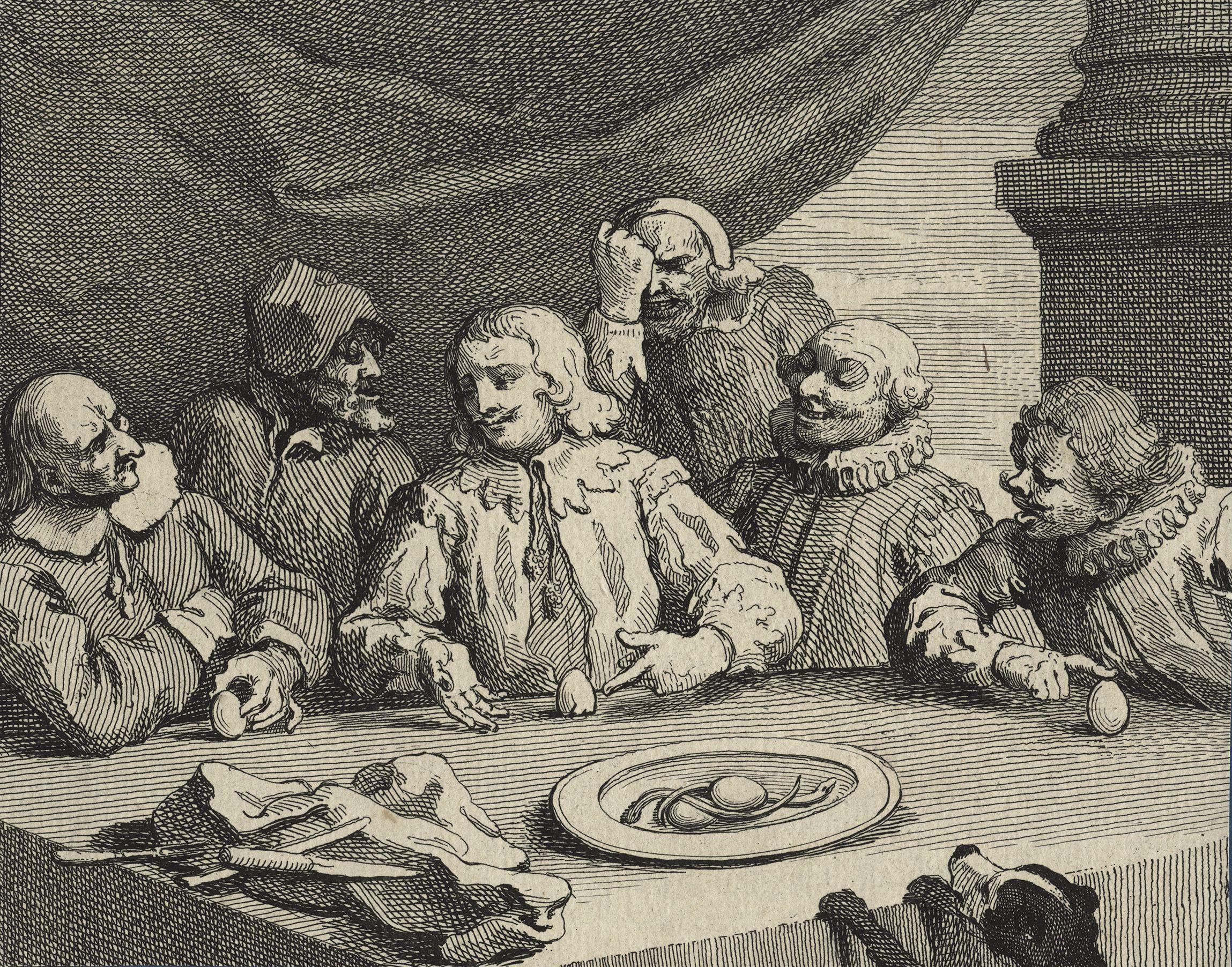
Columbus Breaking the Egg (William Hogarth, 1752)

An egg of Columbus or Columbus's egg (Italian: uovo di Colombo [ˈwɔːvo di koˈlombo]) refers to a seemingly impossible task that becomes easy once understood. The expression refers to an apocryphal story, dating from at least the 16th century, in which it is said that Christopher Columbus, having been told that finding a new trade route was inevitable and no great accomplishment, challenges his critics to make an egg stand on its tip. After his challengers give up, Columbus does it himself by tapping the egg on the table to flatten its tip.

The story is often alluded to when discussing creativity. The term has also been used as the trade name of a dissection puzzle and several mechanical puzzles.

== Source of the story ==
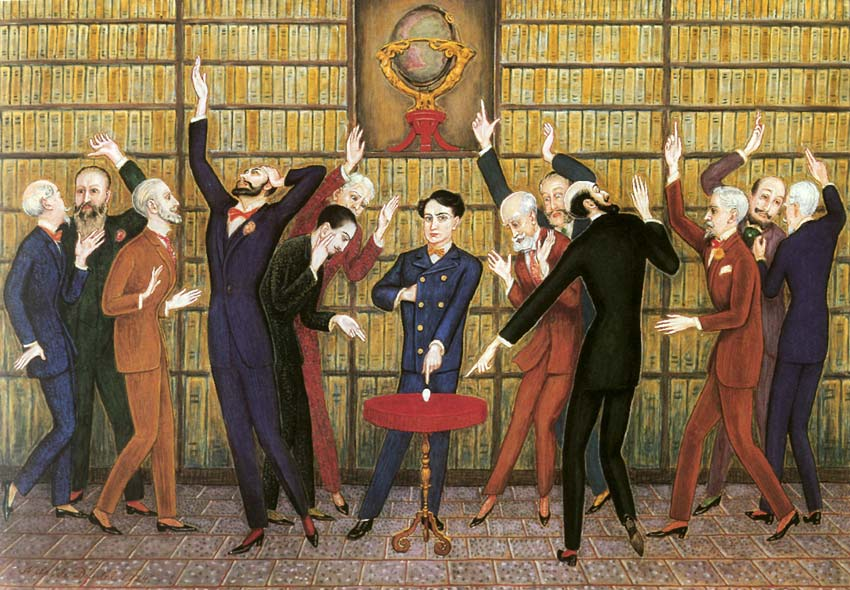
Columbus' egg (Nils von Dardel, 1924)

The Columbus egg story may have originated with Italian historian and traveler Girolamo Benzoni. In his book History of the New World, published in 1565, he wrote:

Trovandosi adunque Colombo in un convito con molti nobili Spagnuoli, dove si ragionaua (come si costuma,) dell'Indie; uno di loro hebbe a dire. Signor Christofano ancora che voi non haveste trovato l'Indie, non sarebbe mancato ch'il simile hauesse tentanto, come voi, quà nella nostra Spagna; come quella che è de grand'huomini giudiciosi ripiena, cosmografi, & letterati. Non rispose Colombo à queste parole cosa alcuna, ma fattosi portare un'ovo, lo pose in tavola, dicendo; io voglio, Signori, con qual si voglia di voi giuocare una scomessa chen non farete stare quest'ovo in piedi come farò io, ma nudo senza cosa alcuna. Pruovaronsi tutti, & à nessuno successe il farlo stare in piedi; come alle mani del Colombo egli venne, dandogli una battuta su la tavola lo fermò, stricciando cosi un poco della punta; onde tutti restarono smarriti, intendendo che voleva dire; che dopo il fatto ciascuno sà fare, che dovevano prima cercare l'Indie, & non ridersi di chi le cercava innanzi, come un pezzo s'erano risi, & maravigliati, come cosa impossibile à essere.

Translation:

Columbus being at a party with many noble Spaniards, where, as was customary, the subject of conversation was the Indies: one of them undertook to say: "Mr. Christopher, even if you had not found the Indies, we should not have been devoid of a man who would have attempted the same that you did, here in our own country of Spain, as it is full of great men clever in cosmography and literature." Columbus said nothing in answer to these words, but having desired an egg to be brought to him, he placed it on the table saying: "Gentlemen, I will lay a wager with any of you, that you will not make this egg stand up as I will, naked and without anything at all." They all tried, and no one succeeded in making it stand up. When the egg came round to the hands of Columbus, by beating it down on the table he fixed it, having thus crushed a little of one end; wherefore all remained confused, understanding what he would have said: that after the deed is done, everybody knows how to do it; that they ought first to have sought for the Indies, and not laugh at him who had sought for it first, while they for some time had been laughing, and wondered at it as an impossibility.

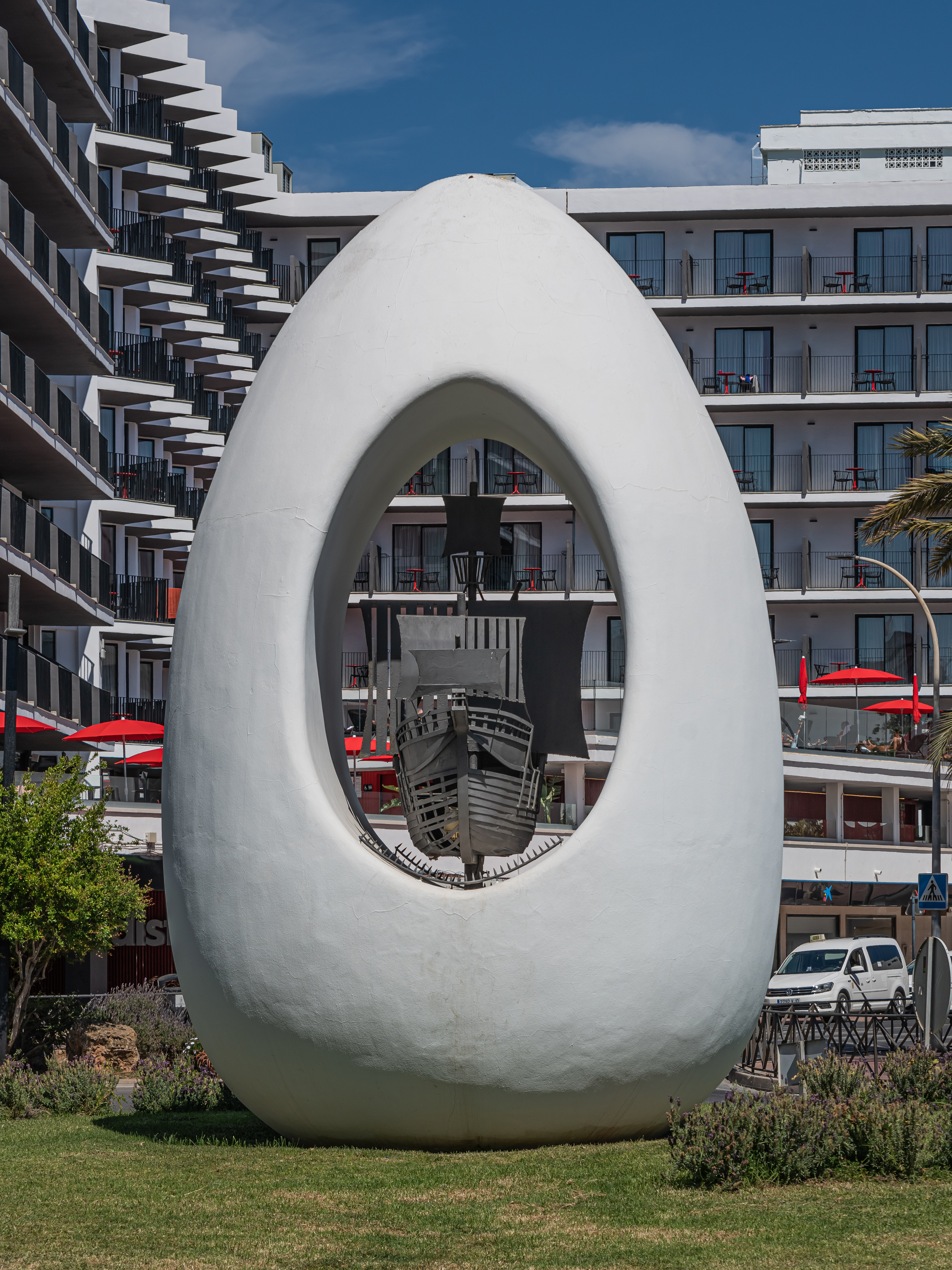
Monument commemorating Columbus' discovery of the Americas in the shape of an egg in Sant Antoni de Portmany, Ibiza

The factual accuracy of this story is called into question by its similarity to another tale published fifteen years earlier (while Benzoni was still travelling in the Americas) by painter and architect Giorgio Vasari. According to Vasari, the young Italian architect Filippo Brunelleschi had designed an unusually large and heavy dome for Santa Maria del Fiore in Florence, the capital of Tuscany. City officials had asked to see his model, but he refused, proposing instead:

...che chi fermasse in sur un marmo piano un uovo ritto, quello facesse la cupola, che quivi si vedrebbe lo ingegno loro. Fu tolto uno uovo, e da tutti que' maestri provato a farlo star ritto, nessuno sapeva il modo. Fu da loro detto a Filippo ch'e' lo fermasse, et egli con grazia lo prese e datoli un colpo del culo in sul piano del marmo, lo fece star ritto. Romoreggiando gl'artefici che similmente arebbono fatto essi, rispose loro Filippo ridendo che egli averebbono ancora saputo voltare la cupola, vedendo il modello o il disegno. E cosí fu risoluto che egli avessi carico di questa opera, e ne informasse meglio i Consoli e gli operai.

Translation:

...that whosoever could make an egg stand upright on a flat piece of marble should build the cupola, since thus each man's intellect would be discerned. Taking an egg, therefore, all those Masters sought to make it stand upright, but not one could find a way. Whereupon Filippo, being told to make it stand, took it graciously, and, giving one end of it a blow on the flat piece of marble, made it stand upright. The craftsmen protested that they could have done the same; but Filippo answered, laughing, that they could also have raised the cupola, if they had seen the model or the design. And so it was resolved that he should be commissioned to carry out this work.

When the church was finally built it had the shape of half an egg slightly flattened at the top.

== See also ==
- Egg balancing, a Chinese tradition
- Gömböc, an egg-like (convex, homogeneous, solid) 3-D body that has only one stable equilibrium
- Gordian Knot, a legendary impossible knot
- Hindsight bias, the inclination to see events that have already occurred as being more predictable than they were before they took place
- Superegg, an egg-like shape designed by Piet Hein that stands on its ends
- Tesla's Egg of Columbus, Westinghouse Electric display at the 1893 Chicago World's Columbian Exposition
- Väinämöinen in Kalevala was asked to tie an egg into a knot, in which he succeeded
