= Urban shamanism =

Non-traditional shamanism

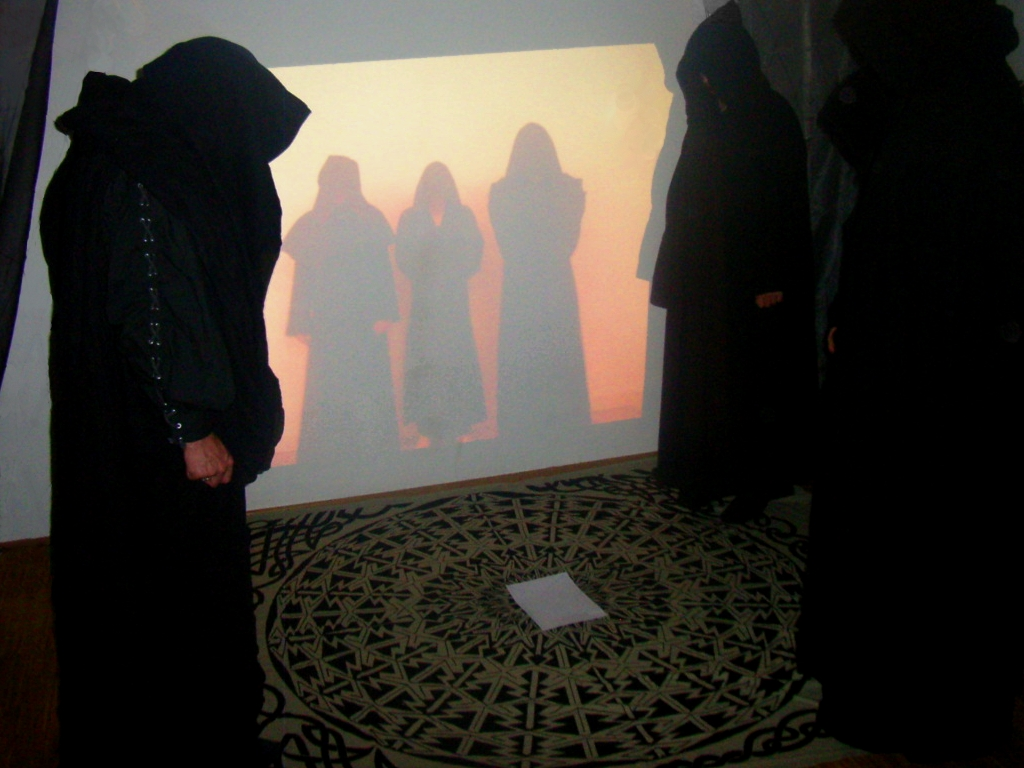
An example of modern merging of ceremonial magic and technology; a videoconference allows participants to practice the ritual when not physically in person

Urban shamanism distinguishes traditional shamanism found in indigenous societies from Western adaptations that draw on contemporary and modern roots. Urban shamanism is practiced primarily by people who do not originate in a traditional indigenous society and who create unique methods that do not follow or claim authenticity in any prior tradition. Urban shamanism traces its beginnings to efforts by Westerners to come to terms with psychoactive plant experiences using their own modern frames of cultural reference influenced by, but outside of, the indigenous rites in which plant medicine is traditionally based. The related terms digital shamanism and digital psychedelia are schools of thought born out of the convergence of technological changes, art movements, and Eastern philosophies during the late 20th century. They parallel and are often associated with technopaganism. In practice, the digital psychedelic process is the fusion of the biological and technological to seek self-knowledge.

== Neurobiological and anthropological dimensions ==
Human consciousness evolved to function across multiple states, including somatic, rhythmic, and communal modes of experience. Medical anthropology identifies cultures that institutionally validate only ordinary waking rational consciousness as "monophasic," in contrast to cultures that maintain multiple recognized states of consciousness.

Research in biological anthropology identifies cross-cultural shamanic practices as consistent with evolved neurobiological functions. Rhythmic communal practices documented across unconnected traditions produce measurable integrative brain states, involving slow-wave synchronization across brain regions including the limbic system and frontal cortex.

The autonomic nervous system maintains an implicit physiological record of stress and recovery, termed allostatic load. Research demonstrates that consistent rhythmic parasympathetic activation produces cumulative change in autonomic baseline over time, distinct from temporary relief produced by isolated events.

Human nervous systems evaluate relational safety through an involuntary biological scanning mechanism termed neuroception, operating through autonomic indicators including heart rate variability, vocal tone, and facial expression, prior to conscious identification.

Neuroimaging research demonstrates that brain activity between individuals synchronizes during communicative presence, with listener neural patterns reflecting those of the speaker, a phenomenon termed neural coupling.

== See also ==
- Cyberdelic
