= Margaret Cheney (author) =

American nonfiction author

Margaret Cheney (1921–2010) was an American nonfiction author and biographer.

Cheney was originally from Eugene, Oregon, where she was born in 1921. She was a student at the Cornish College of the Arts in Seattle, and worked as an editor for the Associated Press. She died in 2010.

== Selected works ==
Her books include:

- A Brief History of the University of California (University of California, Berkeley, Office of University Relations, 1974; 2nd ed., with Patricia A. Pelfrey, University of California Press, 2004)
- Meanwhile Farm (Celestial Arts, 1975).
- The Co-Ed Killer: A Study of the Murders, Mutilations, and Matricide of Edmund Kemper III, on Edmund Kemper (Walker, 1976). Updated as Why?: The Serial Killer in America (R & E Publishers, 1992).
- Tesla: Man Out of Time (Prentice Hall, 1981), biography of inventor Nikola Tesla. Translated by Gregorio Cantera into Spanish as Nikola Tesla: El Genio al que Robaron la Luz (Turner, 2010).
- Tesla: Master of Lightning (Barnes & Noble Publishing, 1999, with Robert Uth).
- Midnight At Mabel's: The Mabel Mercer Story, biography of cabaret singer Mabel Mercer (New Voyage Publishing, 2000).
