= Girolamo Benzoni =

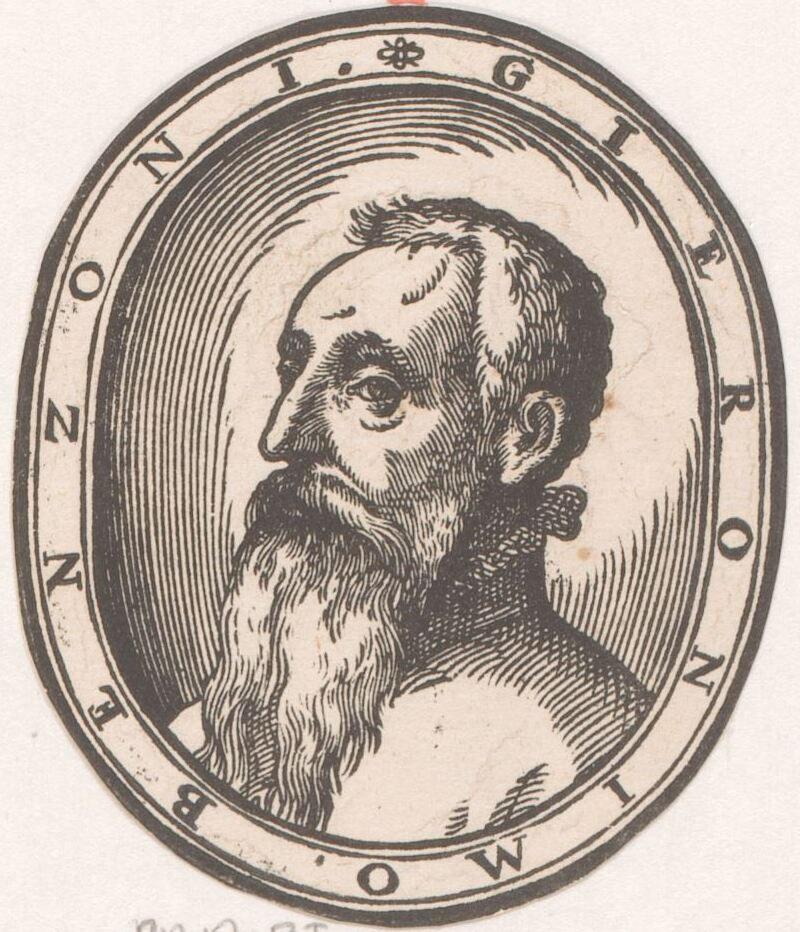
Portrait of Girolamo Benzoni

Girolamo Benzoni (c. 1519—after 1572) was a Milanese merchant and adventurer who spent fifteen years in the New World. In 1565 he published an account of his travels, Historia del Mondo Nuovo, which included vivid descriptions of Spanish cruelty to the native populations. Eleven editions of his book were published between 1565 and 1727 and its popularity contributed to an intense negative perception of Spain which would become known as the Black Legend.

== Life ==
Girolamo Benzoni wrote that he came from humble origins. His Milanese family was ruined by misfortune and the continuing wars that wracked the Italian states. His father could not afford to send Benzoni to a university but instead sent him to France, Germany, Spain and other cities in Italy. During his travels, he heard of the wonders of the New World and formed a strong desire to see them for himself.

In 1541, at the age of twenty-two, Benzoni traveled to Sanlúcar de Barrameda, Spain, and from there sailed to the New World in search of adventure and fortune. Arriving in the West Indies, he visited the pearl-producing region of Margarita in Venezuela and then went on to Hispaniola. He later sailed the coast of Colombia and traveled extensively in Panama and the rest of Central America. Benzoni also traveled to Peru and explored the northern regions of the old Inca Empire. In the 1550s, the Spanish government grew wary of foreign influence in their colonies and began expelling non-Spaniards, including Benzoni. After leaving Peru, he took a ship for Spain bringing with him a "few thousand ducats" he had accumulated during his travels (how he got it is not clear). Along the way he suffered a shipwreck, lost his fortune and was forced to wait several months in Cuba for another ship to Spain.

He finally arrived back in the port town of Sanlúcar on 13 September 1556, penniless and exhausted. Realizing that his experiences in the New World were his only marketable possession, Benzoni wrote an account of his travels which was published in two successful editions in 1565 and 1572. After writing a new dedication to the 1572 edition, Benzoni disappeared from history.

== Works ==
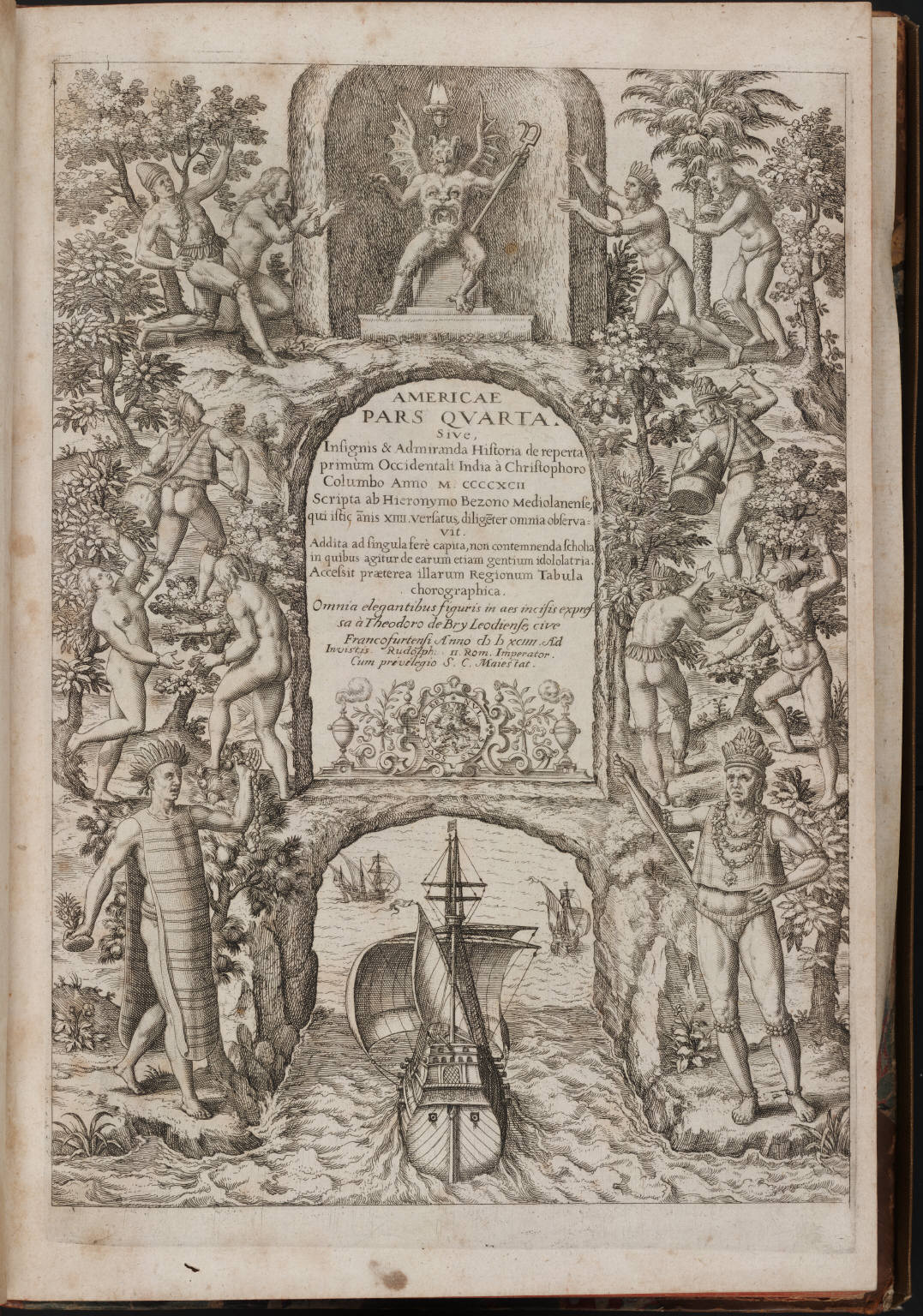
Title page of the edition of Historia del Mondo Nuovo by De Bry

Benzoni's Historia del Mondo Nuovo (History of the New World) was first published in 1565 by Apresso Francesco Rampazetto of Venice and was dedicated to Pope Pius IV. The book is a meandering mixture of travelogue, geography, natural history and adventure. The narrative moves between past and present with a pastiche of personal anecdotes, hearsay, and history lifted from other sources. Benzoni emphasizes the savagery he found in the Americas and is particularly critical of Spanish greed and mistreatment of the indigenous population. He also takes care to describe native culture: food preparation, sleeping habits, dances, and building methods. Benzoni was one of the first to describe the custom of smoking tobacco.

A second edition with minor changes was published in 1572. A Latin version was published in Geneva in 1578 and then several editions of Historia were published in rapid succession, including translations into at least five languages. In 1579, French and German editions appeared, with translations by Eustace Vignon and Nicolaus Höniger respectively. By the end of the sixteenth century at least a dozen editions had been published throughout Europe. Of special importance was the 1594 edition published by Theodor de Bry, which was richly illustrated. In 1610, a Dutch translation by Karel van Mander was printed in Haarlem. Eventually, 32 editions were issued. The first English translation, by William Henry Smyth, was published in 1857 by the Hakluyt Society.

== Influence ==
Benzoni's Historia was published at a time when Europeans were eager for information about the New World. His stories of Spanish greed and cruelty also fed into a growing distrust and hatred of Spain. Ultimately, Historia had a powerful impact on attitudes toward Spain during the sixteenth and seventeenth centuries. Although Bartolomé de las Casas is often cited for his role in shaping the Spanish Black Legend, Barzoni may in fact have reached more readers and had more influence during the sixteenth century.

== See also ==
- Egg of Columbus
- Black legend (Spain)
