= Egg of Columbus (tangram puzzle) =

Geometrical puzzle

Construction of the Egg of Columbus "tangram" puzzle with dimensions – some versions split the white triangle along the dotted line

The Egg of Columbus (Ei des Columbus in German) is a dissection puzzle consisting of a flat egg-like shape divided into 9 or 10 pieces by straight cuts. The goal of the puzzle is to rearrange the pieces to form other specific shapes, such as animals (see below).

The earliest known examples were produced by German toy manufacturer Richter. Production was ceased in 1963, but renewed at the start of the 21st century.

Because the two pieces coloured turquoise in these diagrams lack bilateral symmetry, some shapes in which both pieces have the same chirality, as in two of the examples below, require one of them to be flipped over.

Some models that can be formed from the shapes in the Egg of Columbus. The rightmost two models on the top row require flipping over one of the cyan pieces. The bottom row requires the light grey triangle to be split into two darker grey triangles.

== See also ==
- Egg of Columbus
